= Milorad Dodik =

Bosnian Serb politician (born 1959)

- Милорад Додик
- Dodik in 2026

President of Republika Srpska
- In office 15 November 2022 – 12 June 2025 (Note: The Central Election Commission ordered Dodik's removal on 6 August 2025. On 18 August, his appeal against the decision of the Central Election Commission was rejected and his mandate as Republika Srpska president was officially terminated. The termination was marked as 12 June 2025, due to the Bosnian state court's verdict becoming legally binding on that day. The National Assembly of Republika Srpska initially rejected the court's decision and supported Dodik as the president, but ultimately accepted the decision two months later.)
- Vice President: Davor Pranjić; Ćamil Duraković
- Preceded by: Željka Cvijanović
- Succeeded by: Ana Trišić-Babić (acting)
- In office 15 November 2010 – 19 November 2018
- Vice President: See list: Enes Suljkanović Emil Vlajki Ramiz Salkić Josip Jerković
- Preceded by: Rajko Kuzmanović
- Succeeded by: Željka Cvijanović

Chairman of the Presidency of Bosnia and Herzegovina
- In office 20 November 2020 – 20 July 2021
- Preceded by: Šefik Džaferović
- Succeeded by: Željko Komšić
- In office 20 November 2018 – 20 July 2019
- Preceded by: Bakir Izetbegović
- Succeeded by: Željko Komšić

Serb member of the Presidency of Bosnia and Herzegovina
- In office 20 November 2018 – 15 November 2022
- Prime Minister: Denis Zvizdić; Zoran Tegeltija
- Preceded by: Mladen Ivanić
- Succeeded by: Željka Cvijanović

Prime Minister of Republika Srpska
- In office 28 February 2006 – 15 November 2010
- Preceded by: Pero Bukejlović
- Succeeded by: Anton Kasipović (acting)
- In office 31 January 1998 – 16 January 2001
- Preceded by: Gojko Kličković
- Succeeded by: Mladen Ivanić

President of the Alliance of Independent Social Democrats
- Incumbent
- Assumed office 10 March 1996
- Preceded by: Office established

Personal details
- Born: 12 March 1959 (age 67) Banja Luka, PR Bosnia and Herzegovina, FPR Yugoslavia
- Party: Alliance of Independent Social Democrats (1996–present)
- Other political affiliations: Union of Reform Forces (1990–1991)
- Spouse: Snježana Dodik
- Children: Gorica and Igor
- Education: University of Belgrade (BA)

Milorad Dodik (Serbian Cyrillic: Милорад Додик, pronounced [mîloraːd dǒdik]; born 12 March 1959) is a Bosnian Serb politician who served as president of Republika Srpska from 2022 until his removal from office in 2025. Having previously held the office from 2010 to 2018, he also served as the Serb member of the Presidency of Bosnia and Herzegovina from 2018 to 2022.

Dodik has been the president of the Alliance of Independent Social Democrats (SNSD) since its formation in 1996 and has held several political offices within Republika Srpska, the Serb-majority entity of Bosnia and Herzegovina. He served as the prime minister of Republika Srpska from 1998 to 2001 and again from 2006 to 2010.

In February 2025, the Court of Bosnia and Herzegovina sentenced Dodik to one year's imprisonment and forbade him from political activity for six years due to defying decisions by the High Representative. The verdict was confirmed in August 2025. The one-year prison sentence was subsequently commuted to a fine. On 18 August, Dodik's appeal was rejected and his mandate as president was officially terminated, with the termination date marked as 12 June 2025. The National Assembly of Republika Srpska initially disputed this decision, but ultimately accepted it in October 2025.

Initially, both Dodik and the SNSD were viewed as moderate and reformist alternatives to the ultranationalist Serb Democratic Party during the 1990s and early 2000s. However, since then, both Dodik and the SNSD have adopted a more Serbian nationalist and separatist stance, advocating for the right of Bosnian Serbs to self-determination. His tenure has been marked by accusations of authoritarianism from his critics, the undermining of federal Bosnian institutions, and closer ties with both Russia and Serbia.

== Early life and education ==
Dodik was born in Banja Luka to Bogoljub and Mira Dodik. He lived in Laktaši, where he attended elementary school. There, he played on the town's basketball team in Yugoslavia's amateur league. In 1978, he graduated from an agricultural high school in Banja Luka, after which he entered the Faculty of Political Sciences at the University of Belgrade, where he graduated in 1983.

== Early political career ==
From 1986 through 1990, Dodik was the chairman of the executive board of the Municipal Assembly of Laktaši. In 1990, at the first multi-party elections in Bosnia and Herzegovina, he was elected to the Assembly of the Socialist Republic of Bosnia and Herzegovina, as a candidate of the Union of Reform Forces of Yugoslavia and was a political disciple of liberal reformer Ante Marković. During the Bosnian War, Dodik served as a representative in the National Assembly of Republika Srpska.

During that time, he formed the Independent Members of Parliament Caucus (Клуб независних посланика у Народној Скупштини Републике Српске, Klub nezavisnih poslanika u Narodnoj Skupštini Republike Srpske), which was the only political opposition to the Serb Democratic Party (Српска демократска странка, Srpska demokratska stranka) and its allies, which held the absolute majority in the wartime parliament of the Republika Srpska. The caucus he chaired was to form the core of the Party of Independent Social Democrats (Stranka nezavisnih socijaldemokrata, or SNSD) in 1996, after the peace was signed as a result of the Dayton Agreement. He was elected as the first President of SNSD. The party later united with another social-democratic party to form the Alliance of Independent Social Democrats, of which Dodik is president.

== Prime Minister of Republika Srpska ==
=== First term (1998–2001) ===
After conflicts between Biljana Plavšić with the rest of Radovan Karadžić's Serb Democratic Party (SDS), she founded a new political party, the Serb National Alliance (SNS). Early elections in Republika Srpska were held in 1997, after which Plavšić and her SNS closely cooperated with the smaller Serb socialist parties (Socialist Party and Dodik's SNSD). Dodik was nominated Prime Minister of Republika Srpska, even though his party had only two seats in the National Assembly.

=== Second term (2006–2010) ===
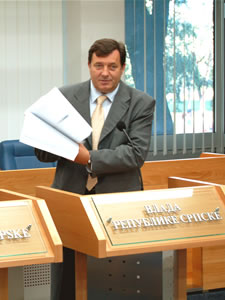
Dodik demonstrates the amount of paperwork reduced by USAID-supported reforms, April 2007

During the campaign for the 2006 general election, following Montenegrin independence, Dodik said that Republika Srpska didn't rule out its right to an independence referendum. At the election, Dodik's SNSD won 46.9% percent of votes, while the SDS won 19.5%. The international community saw him as a moderate democratic leader of Republika Srpska. Dodik had support from Western countries that were seeking to marginalise the Serbian nationalists. They believed that they had found an alternative in Dodik. After he became the prime minister, the West continued to support him at the expense of Serb nationalist parties. The Western countries promised that, if Dodik remains the prime minister, Republika Srpska would receive Western economic assistance. The High Representative for Bosnia and Herzegovina and the Western powers also wanted to ensure that he realised his promise to return 70,000 Croat and Bosniak refugees to Republika Srpska.

As promised, after Dodik won the election, Republika Srpska received financial aid from the European Union, that money was used to pay salaries for civil servants and the police. In mid-February 2007, Dodik travelled to the United States, where he was received by Madeleine Albright. She described him as "a breath of fresh air" and pledged €3.6 million of immediate aid. Republika Srpska also received aid from the British government in the same month. British Foreign Secretary, Robin Cook, said in front of the National Assembly of Republika Srpska that Dodik's government "did more in its first two weeks to improve the lives of the people than its predecessor did in two years."

Later, Dodik became the most powerful Serb politician in Bosnia and Herzegovina, and the West viewed him as "an unabashed nationalist and the greatest threat to Bosnia and Herzegovina's fragile, multiethnic peace." After he became a prime minister, Dodik became even more nationalist than the SDS. During a police reform in Republika Srpska, Dodik managed to create a nationalist profile for himself. Haris Silajdžić, meanwhile, won election for Bosniak member of the Presidency of Bosnia and Herzegovina. As he was a minister during the Bosnian War and close associate of Alija Izetbegović, Silajdžić criticised Republika Srpska as a genocidal entity and called for its abolition. Moreover, Silajdžić advocated further centralisation of Bosnia and Herzegovina.

On 5 May 2008, Dodik and Serbian President Boris Tadić inaugurated the Park Republika Srpska in Belgrade.

On 1 June 2008, during a visit to Zagreb, Dodik stated that Operation Storm was an act of ethnic cleansing carried out against Serbs and regarded it the "greatest ethnic cleansing committed after World War II". Croatian president Stjepan Mesić criticised Dodik for encouraging dissatisfied Serbs in Croatia to live in Republika Srpska while neglecting to invite Bosniak and Croat refugees to return. Ivo Banac, president of the Croatian Helsinki Committee, stated that Croatia had been defending itself at the time, and criticized Dodik's comments as provocations.

On 12 December 2008, Dodik stated that Muslim judges should not be allowed to preside over cases in Republika Srpska. He elaborated that "it is unacceptable for RS that Muslim judges try us and throw out complaints that are legally founded. And we think that it is only because they are Muslims, Bosniaks and that they have a negative orientation towards the RS, and we see the conspiracy that has been created." Dodik's comments were condemned as "extremely chauvinistic" by international institutions, the United States Embassy in Sarajevo and other officials.

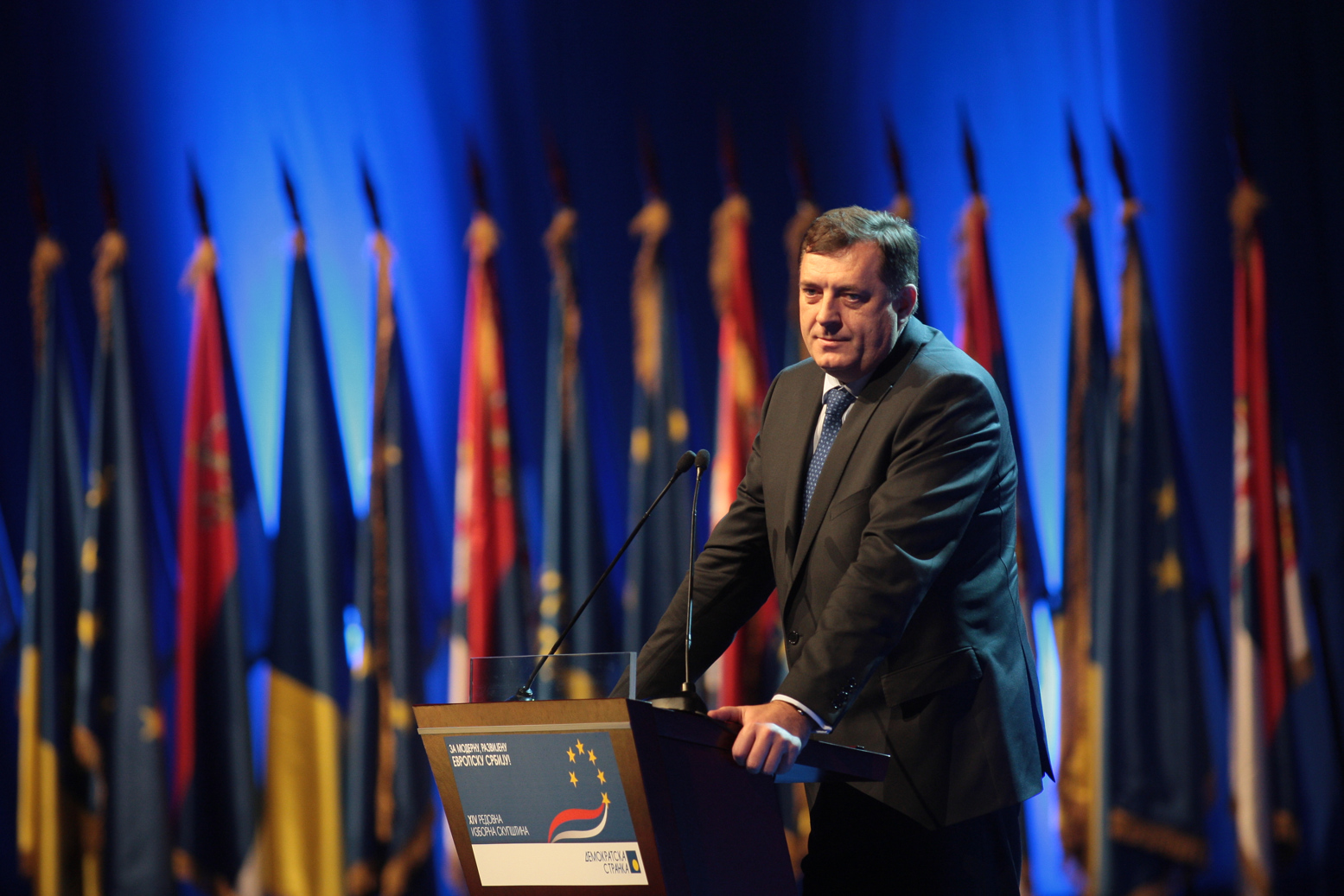
Dodik giving a speech, 2010

On 9 September 2009, he and Boris Tadić, President of Serbia, opened a school in Pale with the name "Serbia". Bosniak and Croat members of the tripartite Presidency of Bosnia and Herzegovina were not consulted about Tadić's trip.

On 27 October 2009, Dodik provided a Republika Srpska government jet to pick up Biljana Plavšić, former president of Republika Srpska convicted of war crimes, and welcomed her to Belgrade after her early release from a Swedish prison. He cited "purely moral reasons" for doing so. Željko Komšić, Croat member of the Bosnian Presidency, cancelled a planned visit to Sweden in protest.

In November 2009, Dodik refused to hand over requested documents detailing the financing of a government building complex in Banja Luka worth 110 million euro and the construction of a highway to international prosecutors at the Court of Bosnia and Herzegovina. He stated that the court had no jurisdiction over Republika Srpska and filed a lawsuit against Deputy High Representative Raffi Gregorian and international prosecutors. Dodik accused Gregorian of leading a plot against Republika Srpska and said a bias against Serbs existed among central-level prosecutors and judges.

On 10 November 2009, Dodik revealed that he seriously considered giving Biljana Plavšić an office in the Senate. He stated, "We are working on revising the law on the President of the Republic, which would award Plavšić, and other former presidents, the opportunity to enjoy some privileges like the office, monetary compensation, counsellor, secretary, official car with a driver and so forth." Mladen Bosić, leader of the Serb Democratic Party, criticized Dodik.

On 19 January 2010, Croatian president Stjepan Mesić stated that if Dodik were to call a referendum for independence for Republika Srpska, he would send the Croatian military to intervene.

== Presidency (2018–2022) ==
=== 2018 general election ===
Dodik announced his candidacy in the Bosnian general election on 26 December 2017, running for Bosnia's three-person Presidency member, representing the Serbs.

At the general election held on 7 October 2018, Dodik was elected to the Presidency, having obtained 53.88% of the vote. The incumbent Bosnian Serb presidency member Mladen Ivanić, was second with 42.74%.

=== Domestic policy ===
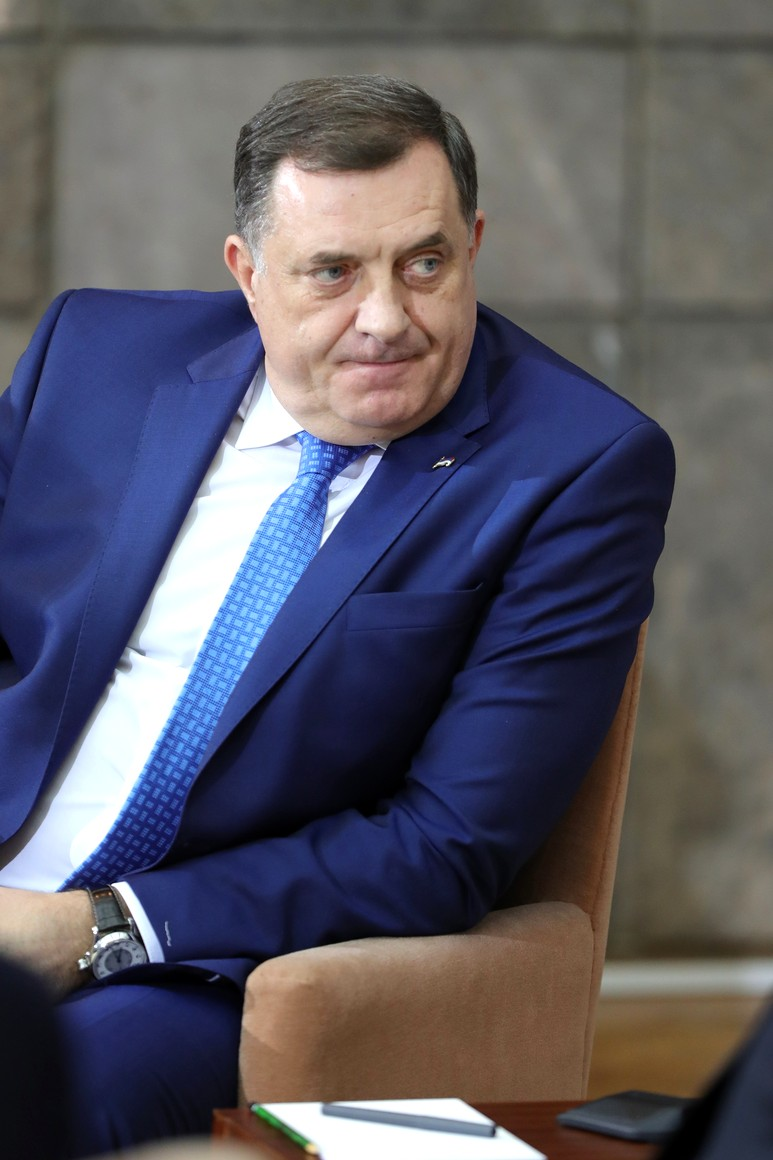
Dodik in January 2019

During the first month of his presidency, quarrels transpired between Dodik and Bosniak member Šefik Džaferović, with the former stating he would not attend the first Presidency session under the new leadership until the flag of Republika Srpska was put in his office. Dodik eventually relented, agreeing to hold the session with only the national flag.

In March 2019, Dodik appointed acclaimed filmmaker Emir Kusturica as his advisor.

On 28 January 2021, the Central Election Commission of Bosnia and Herzegovina reported Dodik to the Prosecutor's Office of Bosnia and Herzegovina for spreading national hatred. He was reported for verbally insulting Central Election Commission member Vanja Bjelica-Prutina for deciding to repeat the 2020 Bosnian municipal elections in the cities of Doboj and Srebrenica, where Dodik's party had won, because of electoral irregularities.

In May 2021, Džaferović and Croat Presidency member Željko Komšić attended a joint military exercise with the United States Army, while Dodik refused.

On 5 January 2022, the United States Office of Foreign Assets Control imposed sanctions on Dodik under Executive Order 14033 ('Blocking Property and Suspending Entry Into the United States of Certain Persons Contributing to the Destabilising Situation in the Western Balkans'). In making the announcement, Under Secretary of the Treasury for Terrorism and Financial Intelligence Brian E. Nelson said that "Milorad Dodik's destabilizing corrupt activities and attempts to dismantle the Dayton Peace Accords, motivated by his own self-interest, threaten the stability of Bosnia and Herzegovina and the entire region". On 11 April 2022, Dodik and Željka Cvijanović, the president of Republika Srpska, were sanctioned by the United Kingdom for attempting to undermine the legitimacy of Bosnia and Herzegovina, with British Foreign Secretary Liz Truss stating that Dodik and Cvijanović "are deliberately undermining the hard-won peace in Bosnia and Herzegovina. Encouraged by Putin, their reckless behaviour threatens stability and security across the Western Balkans."

On 16 November 2022, Dodik was succeeded by Željka Cvijanović as the Serb member of the Presidency.

==== COVID-19 pandemic ====
As the COVID-19 pandemic in Bosnia and Herzegovina started in March 2020, the Presidency announced the Armed Forces' placement of quarantine tents at the country's borders intended for Bosnian citizens returning home. Every Bosnian citizen arriving to the country was obligated to self-quarantine for 14 days starting from the day of arrival. Tents were set up on the northern border with Croatia.

On 21 December 2020, Dodik was admitted to hospital due to bilateral pneumonia, but did not contract COVID-19. One day later though, on 22 December, it was confirmed that he tested positive for COVID-19; by 28 December, Dodik recovered.

On 2 March 2021, Serbian president Aleksandar Vučić came to Sarajevo and met with Dodik and other presidency members, Džaferović and Komšić, and donated 10,000 doses of AstraZeneca COVID-19 vaccines for the COVID-19 pandemic. Three days later, on 5 March, Slovenian president Borut Pahor also came to Sarajevo and met with Dodik, Džaferović and Komšić, and stated that Slovenia will also donate 4,800 AstraZeneca COVID-19 vaccines for the pandemic.

On 21 April 2021, he received his first dose of the Sputnik V COVID-19 vaccine.

==== Disputation of the High Representative ====
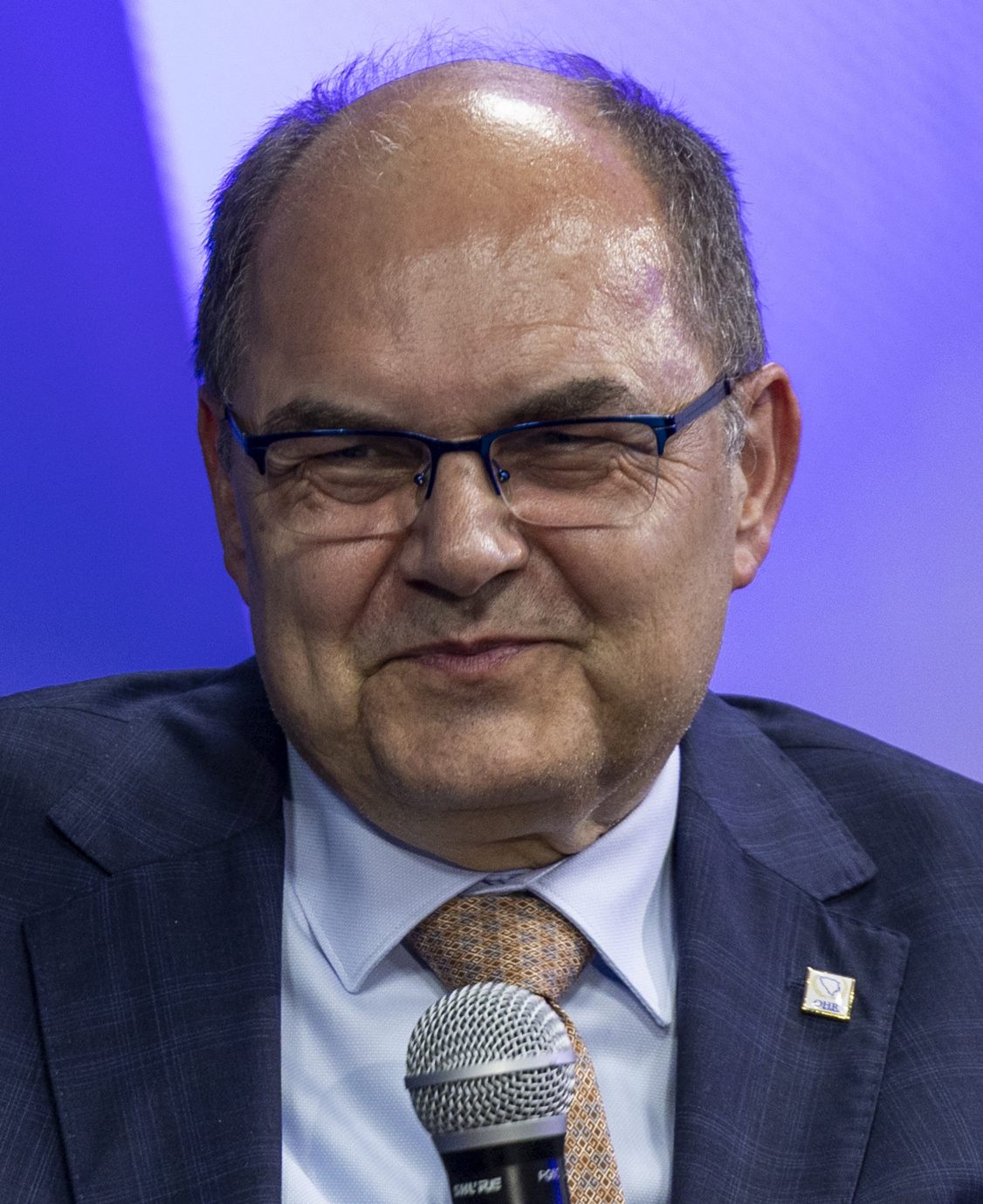
Christian Schmidt (pictured), who served as the High Representative from 2021 to 2026, was delegitimized by Dodik since his appointment as the peace envoy

On 27 May 2021, Valentin Inzko resigned from his office of the High Representative for Bosnia and Herzegovina, with German politician Christian Schmidt set to become the new High Representative on 1 August 2021, after getting nominated by the German government. This was met with disapproval by Dodik, with him stating that "we do not accept Schmidt, everything is a simple bluff of the international community." A few days later, Dodik said that "Schmidt will have no legitimacy for Republika Srpska unless he gets confirmed by the United Nations Security Council", adding that Republika Srpska will "receive Schmidt only as a tourist" if he were not to get confirmed by the Security Council. Russia and China likewise consider Schmidt's election and authority illegitimate due to the lack of a UN Security Council resolution approving of his candidacy, as do a number of other politicians in Bosnia and Herzegovina besides Dodik.

On 29 June, Bosnian Foreign Minister Bisera Turković had a heated diplomatic exchange with Russian Ambassador to the United Nations Vasily Nebenzya at a United Nations Security Council meeting in New York City. The topic of the meeting was the political situation in Bosnia and Herzegovina, with focus being on the Office of the High Representative, regarding if it's time for its closure after being created in 1995 following the Bosnian War. Her address at the Security Council was heavily criticized by Dodik. Some days before, Dodik unsuccessfully tried to prevent Turković's Security Council address, even writing a letter to Russian Foreign Minister Sergey Lavrov asking him for help.

In the last ten days of his term as High Representative, on 23 July 2021, Valentin Inzko unexpectedly imposed changes to the Penal Code of Bosnia and Herzegovina, banning the denial of genocide in Bosnia and Herzegovina. This was met with outrage by Bosnian Serb politicians, especially by Dodik, stating "We [Republika Srpska] are forced to go into dissolution" and repeating many times that the "genocide did not happen." As a response to Inzko's imposed law, most Serb representatives in the national institutions, led by Dodik, decided to reject Inzko's law, as well as decided not to participate in the work of Bosnian national institutions until further notice, sparking a new political crisis in the country.

Following a United Nations Security Council meeting on 4 November 2021, Dodik vowed to sue the new High Representative Christian Schmidt, and described the meeting as a "Victory for Republika Srpska" and proving that "Christian Schmidt is the High Representative only in his mind". According to media outlet Klix.ba, all the UN Security Council members except Russia "directly expressed their support for Schmidt and his powers" as High Representative. At the meeting in question, Russia's representative stated that Schmidt's appointment had taken place "in circumvention of the Security Council" and that "the Office of the High Representative remains vacant. As of today, there is no High Representative". China's representative said that "the Security Council has a clear role to play in the appointment of the High Representative. That has long been an established practice and should be fully respected".

On 26 January 2022, following a meeting on constitutional reform in Sarajevo, Dodik said that he and his party would be "willing to participate in the work of the national institutions if a law, banning calling the country's entities genocidal, was passed in Parliament."

==== Military helicopters controversy ====
In August 2021, Komšić and Džaferović instructed the Ministry of Security to be available for putting out the wildfires in Herzegovina which had formed a few days before. This came after Dodik refused to give consent to the Bosnian Armed Forces to use its military helicopters to put out the fires, as the consent of all three members of the Presidency was required for the military force's helicopters to be used. His actions were met with outrage by Bosnian politicians and media; Damir Šabanović, municipal mayor of Jablanica, a town in risk of the wildfires, filed criminal charges against Dodik for "failing or refusing to react and committing a criminal offense by exploiting his official position and failing to perform his official duty."

On 19 August, Dodik justified himself, stating that the "helicopters are 40–50 years old. The people flying them have courage." Subsequently, Bosnian Defence Minister Sifet Podžić dismissed Dodik's reasoning, saying the helicopters were "in excellent condition."

==== Withdrawal of jurisdiction ====
Following a forestry law passed by the Republika Srpska government, the Constitutional Court of Bosnia and Herzegovina, on 23 September 2021, ruled that the law's provision that the forests are the property of Republika Srpska was unconstitutional. Dodik criticized this decision, stating "In RS [Republika Srpska], everything outside the Constitution and Dayton should be annulled."

On 27 September, he announced that Republika Srpska will be withdrawing the approvals which it gave to the agreements on the formation of the Armed Forces of Bosnia and Herzegovina and the High Judicial and Prosecutorial Council of Bosnia and Herzegovina. He later on said that no matter what, nothing will be done "outside the Constitution." Although supporting Dodik's opinion regarding the law banning the denial of genocide, Mirko Šarović, the president of the Serb Democratic Party (SDS), the major opposition party in Republika Srpska, did not support the withdrawal of jurisdiction of the Armed Forces and other national institutions, stating "From Dodik's frivolous initiatives, Republika Srpska will become a target, we have no use of these decisions."

On 20 October 2021, the National Assembly of Republika Srpska just narrowly voted to form an entity Medicines Agency, thus withdrawing their support for the national Bosnian Medicines Agency. The opposition, including the SDS and the Party of Democratic Progress, did not attend the vote in protest against Dodik and his actions.

On 8 November 2021, Dodik announced further withdrawal from the Armed Forces. He stated that the quotas for Serbs and Croats in the army could not be filled, because Serbs and Croats were unwilling to join it, and argued that the total size of the army should be decreased for this reason - otherwise it would "become a Muslim army". He also said that "It is good for Bosnia and Herzegovina to be demilitarized, that was our earlier proposal." Following Dodik's actions, the House of Commons of the United Kingdom organized a debate on the situation in Bosnia and Herzegovina, during which great accusations were made against the work of Dodik, but also Serbia and Russia as countries that support his doings.

On 10 December 2021, the Republika Srpska National Assembly adopted a set of conclusions, including those regarding the Armed Forces, paving the way for the withdrawal of jurisdiction from national to entity levels. Once again, in protest, the opposition did not attend the vote and refused to support the conclusions, stating "This is a farce and a simple election campaign."

=== Foreign policy ===
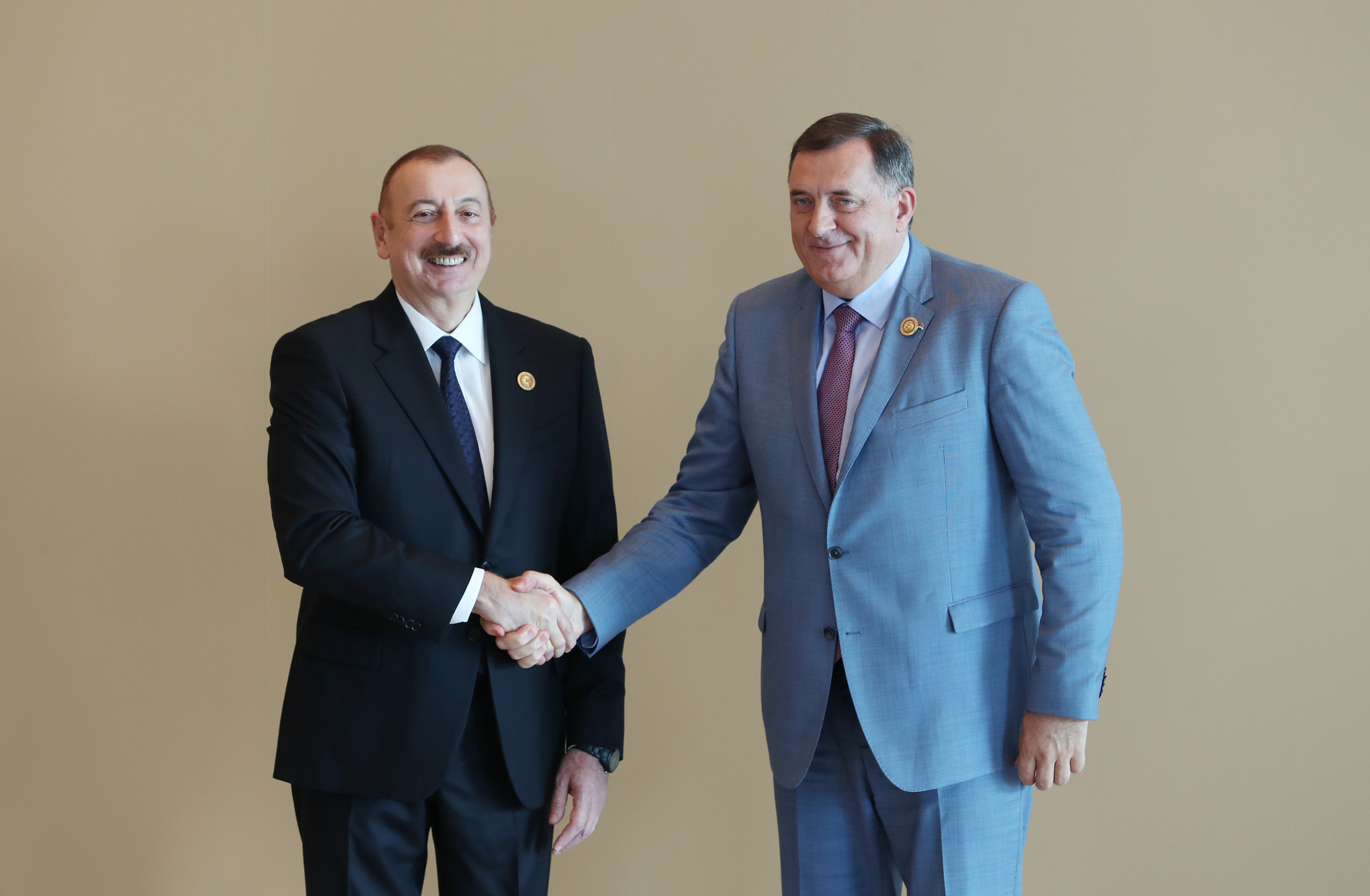
Dodik alongside Azerbaijani president Ilham Aliyev, 25 October 2019

In May 2021, during a flareup in the Israeli–Palestinian conflict, Dodik was thanked by Israeli Prime Minister Benjamin Netanyahu for expressing his support for Israel, unlike his presidency counterparts who expressed their support for Palestine.

In June 2021, Dodik signed the SEECP Declaration in Antalya, Turkey, which among other things, incorporates talks about NATO integration.

On 6 November 2021, he met with Hungarian Prime Minister Viktor Orbán in Banja Luka, in the process thanking him "for the understanding that Hungary has for Republika Srpska." Orbán said that "Republika Srpska is key to peace in the Balkans" and that Hungary will "expand its economic program with Republika Srpska."

On 2 December 2021, Dodik had a meeting with Russian president Vladimir Putin in Moscow, with Dodik stating, "He [Putin] is familiar with the details of the situation in Bosnia and Herzegovina." Following Russia recognizing the Donetsk People's Republic and the Luhansk People's Republic as independent states on 21 February 2022, which are disputed territories in the Ukrainian region of Donbas, Dodik said that Republika Srpska will seek neutrality at the national level regarding the issue of Ukraine. On 24 February, Putin ordered a large-scale invasion of Ukraine, marking a dramatic escalation of the Russo-Ukrainian War that began in 2014. Regarding the invasion, Dodik said that Bosnia and Herzegovina was neutral, having stated the previous day that the "events showed it was a good decision for Bosnia and Herzegovina to not enter NATO, and that the country would not support sanctions."

==== European Union ====
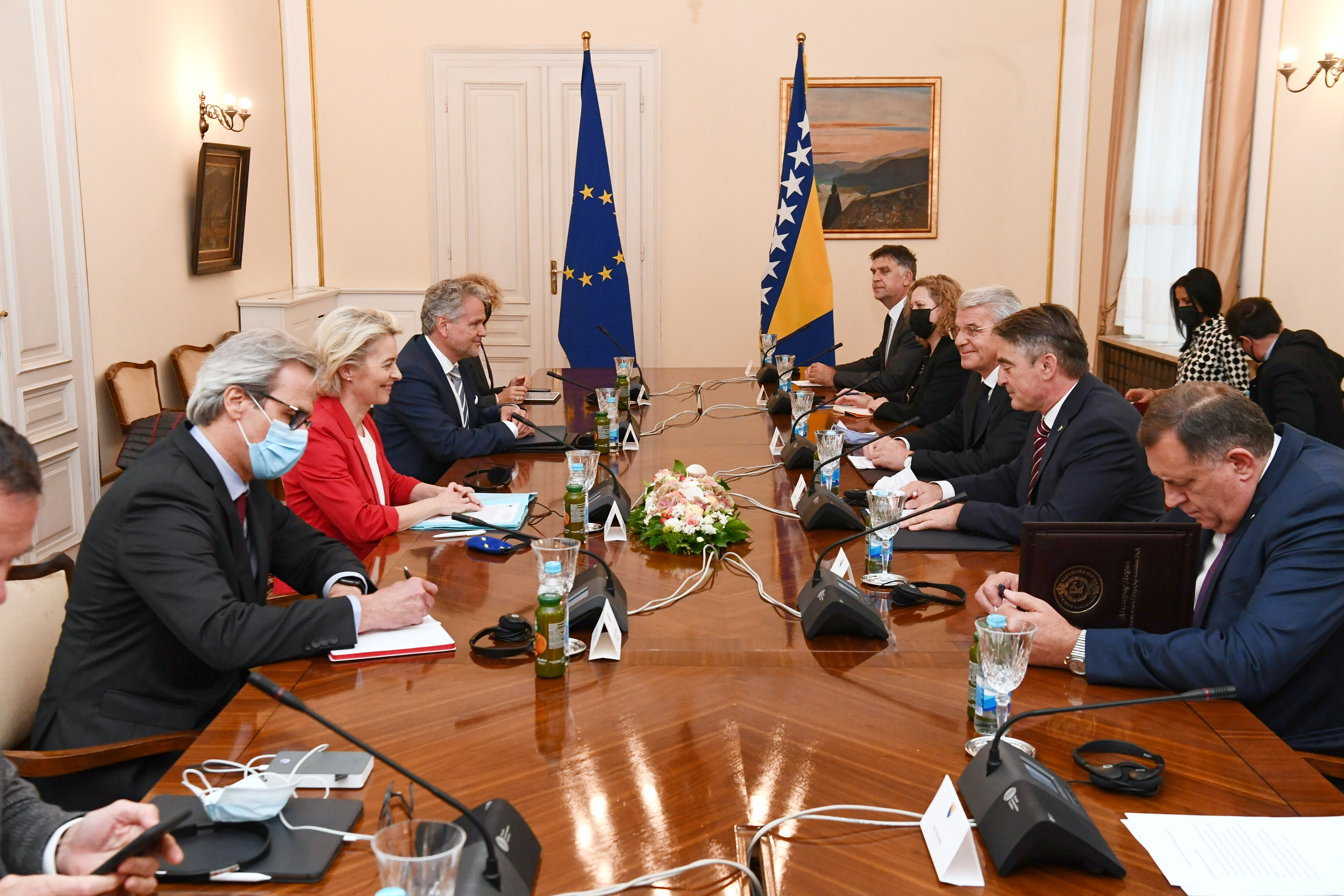
Dodik in a meeting with European Commission President Ursula von der Leyen, 30 September 2021

Originally a big advocate and supporter of the European Union, Dodik has gradually become much more Eurosceptic and critical about the EU.

In September 2020, Dodik and his fellow Presidency members said that an EU candidate status for Bosnia and Herzegovina was possible in the year 2021 if the country "implements successful reforms."

In September 2021, Dodik went to Budapest, Hungary to attend its Demographic Summit. There he met with Slovenian prime minister Janez Janša on 22 September. On 23 September, Dodik made a speech at the summit, where he criticized the European Union, LGBT community and the handling of the previous European migrant crisis. Apart from Dodik and Janša, the summit was also attended by Hungarian prime minister Viktor Orbán, Serbian president Aleksandar Vučić, Czech prime minister Andrej Babiš, Polish prime minister Mateusz Morawiecki and former U.S. vice president Mike Pence, as well as 2022 French presidential election candidate Éric Zemmour.

On 30 September, Dodik, Džaferović and Komšić met with European Commission President Ursula von der Leyen at the Presidency Building in Sarajevo. This was part of von der Leyen's visit to Bosnia and Herzegovina, since she some hours before opened the Svilaj border checkpoint and a bridge over the nearby Sava river, which bears the internationally significant freeway Pan-European Corridor Vc.

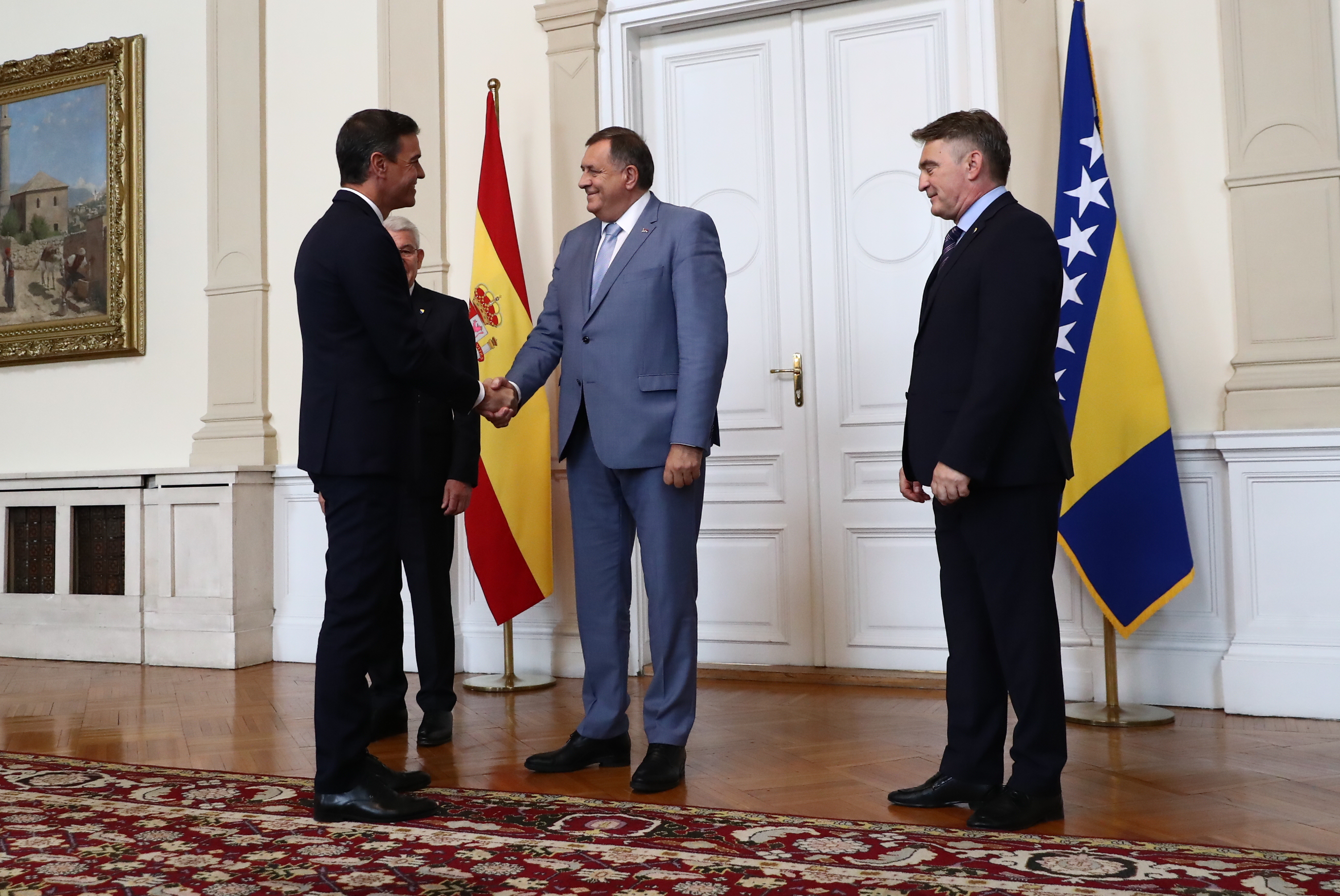
Dodik greeting Spanish Prime Minister Pedro Sánchez, 30 July 2022

In an interview for the largest German news website Der Spiegel, given in October 2021, Dodik, among other things, said that "the Western Balkans have never been further from European Union membership than they are today", thus continuing expressing his Eurosceptic views. In December 2021, German Foreign Minister Annalena Baerbock proposed a "values-driven" foreign policy in conjunction with other European democracies and NATO partners, and called on the EU to implement sanctions against Dodik. On 20 May 2022, Dodik met with European Council President Charles Michel, during his visit to Sarajevo, with whom he discussed about Bosnia and Herzegovina's accession to the EU.

==== Relations with Turkey ====
On 16 March 2021, Dodik, Džaferović and Komšić went on a state visit to Turkey to meet with Turkish President Recep Tayyip Erdoğan. While there, Erdoğan promised to donate Bosnia and Herzegovina 30,000 COVID-19 vaccines for the COVID-19 pandemic. Also on the meeting, Bosnia and Herzegovina and Turkey agreed on mutual recognition and exchange of driving licenses, as well as signing an agreement on cooperation in infrastructure and construction projects, which also refers to the construction of a highway from Bosnia's capital Sarajevo to Serbia's capital Belgrade; the agreement being signed by Minister of Communication and Traffic Vojin Mitrović.

On 27 August 2021, Erdoğan came to Sarajevo on a state visit in Bosnia and Herzegovina and met with all three Presidency members, having talks about more economic and infrastructural cooperation, as well as looking into the construction of the highway from Sarajevo to Belgrade. Also, a trilateral meeting between Turkey, Serbia and Bosnia and Herzegovina was agreed on and should happen soon.

In November 2021, Dodik went to Ankara and again met with Erdoğan. His meeting with Erdoğan was focused on the political crisis in Bosnia and Herzegovina, following Valentin Inzko's imposed changes to the law banning genocide denial in the country. At the meeting, as reported by Dodik, it was said that "the threat of force cannot solve any problem" and that "speculators imposed the story of a possible conflict."

== President of Republika Srpska ==
=== First and second term (2010–2018) ===
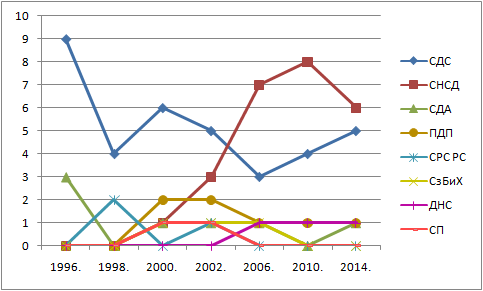
Distribution of mandates for the national House of Representatives from Republika Srpska for the period 1996–2014

In October 2010, Dodik narrowly won the RS presidential election already in the first round, thus becoming the 8th president of the republic.

On 30 November 2010, leaked United States diplomatic cables revealed that Dodik supported the Ahtisaari plan for the independence of Kosovo. The cable was sent by Daniel Fried, a U.S. State Department official, in May 2007 and quoted Dodik as stating that "Kosovo's recognition would follow after such a decision (to adopt the plan) by the UN Security Council". Dodik denied the accusations and stated that Daniel Fried was a liar and a troublemaker.

In May 2011, Dodik planned to have a referendum held in June that he viewed would reflect on the rejection of Bosnian state institutions, including the war crimes court. The High Representative for Bosnia and Herzegovina, Valentin Inzko, warned that the referendum could potentially jeopardize the Dayton Agreement. However, shortly after tensions increased in regards to the proposed referendum, Republika Srpska decided to cancel the referendum, after Dame Catherine Ashton, the EU's High Representative of the Union for Foreign Affairs and Security Policy reassured Dodik in Banja Luka that the EU will examine the complaints of RS on abuses in justice system of Bosnia and Herzegovina, and recommend the changes.

On 25 October 2011, Dodik spoke on "An American Foreign Policy Success Story: The Dayton Accords, Republika Srpska and Bosnia's European Integration" at Columbia University. The event was protested by numerous organizations including the Congress of North American Bosniaks, the Advisory Council for Bosnia and Herzegovina, the Canadian Institute for the Research of Genocide, the Bosnian American Genocide Institute and Education Center, and the International Center for Transitional Justice. Protests also took place while the speech was in progress.

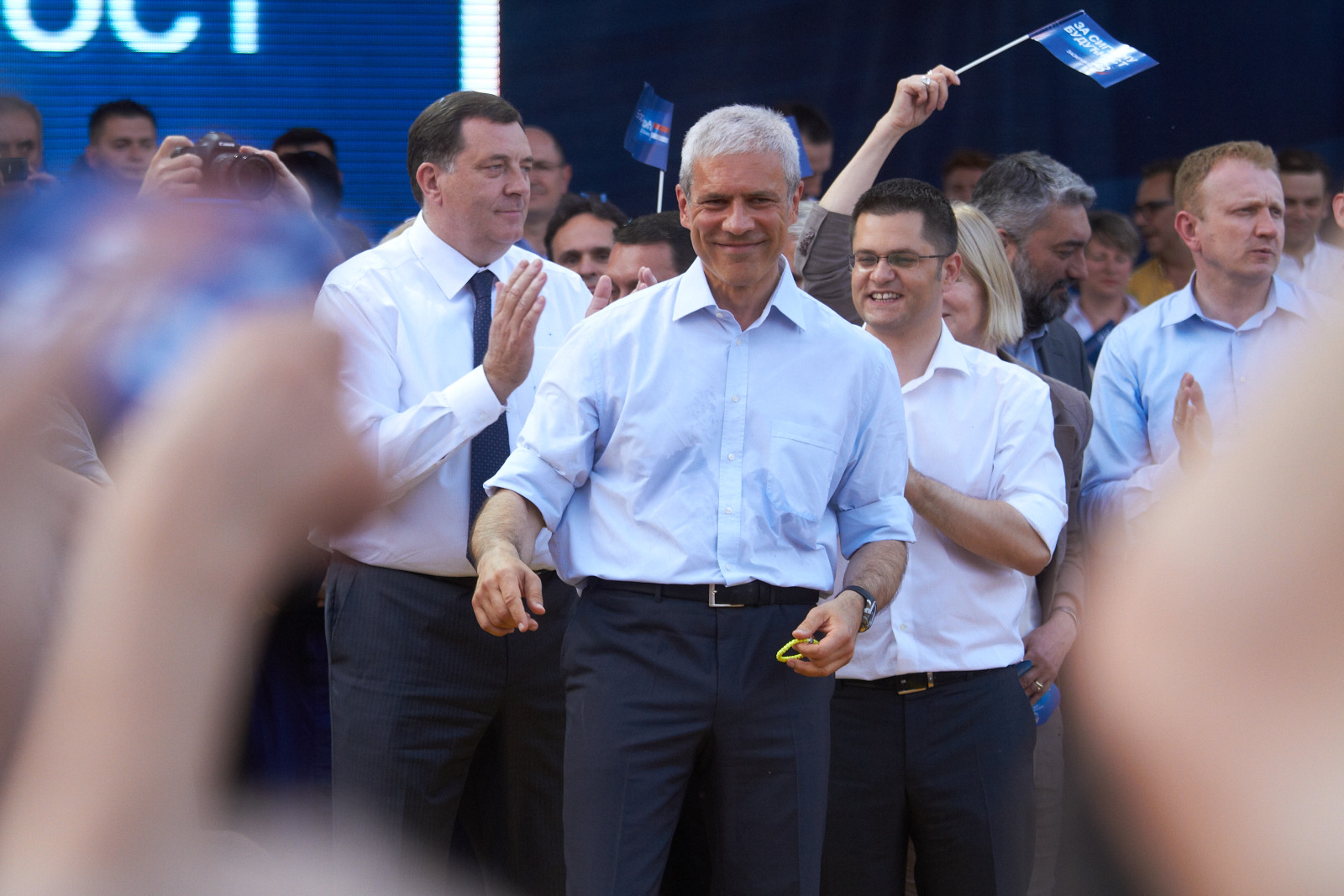
Dodik attending a campaign rally in support of Serbian President Boris Tadić, 2 May 2012

In October 2012, Dodik proposed that Bosnia and Herzegovina's unified armed forces be abolished. On 3 November 2012, Dodik announced that the government of Republika Srpska would donate an undisclosed amount to help pay for the renovation of Serbian Orthodox Patriarch Irinej's old residence in Belgrade. Irinej commented that "this is a great opportunity to show practically the unity of the Serbian people and Serbian church outside our borders." Serb bloggers expressed "disagreement with both at a time of severe economic crisis and hardship" followed.

On 13 November 2012, High Representative Valentin Inzko cited Dodik as "the most frequent, although certainly not the sole, proponent of [Bosnian] state dissolution" in a report to the UN Security Council. He added that "the most recent and troubling of these is an initiative sent by the president to the Republika Srpska National Assembly (NSRS) attempting to create conditions that would unilaterally force the dissolution of the Armed Forces of Bosnia and Herzegovina." Vitaly Churkin, Russian Representative to the United Nations, defended Dodik and blamed the Bosniaks for the tension.

In November 2012, the German state prosecution implicated Dodik and his son in a corruption case involving the Hypo Alpe-Adria-Bank International. The investigation concerned "several criminal offences, including falsifying documents, faking financial and business reports and fraud." The judicial system of Bosnia and Herzegovina initially investigated the case following a complaint filing, but "political pressures soon stopped the judicial bodies and the police in the RS." According to Domagoj Margetić, a Croatian journalist, Dodik had bribed and threatened him in order to not link him to the Hypo Group Alpe Adria affair story. On 26 November 2012, High Representative in Bosnia and Herzegovina, Valentin Inzko, confirmed that there was no investigation against President of Republika Srpska Milorad Dodik and his family in Germany or Austria.

On 1 January 2017, the United States Office of Foreign Assets Control imposed sanctions on Dodik pursuant to Executive Order 13304 and due to his role in defying the Constitutional Court of Bosnia and Herzegovina. "By obstructing the Dayton Accords, Milorad Dodik poses a significant threat to the sovereignty and territorial integrity of Bosnia and Herzegovina," said John E. Smith, Acting OFAC Director. "Today's action underscores the U.S. commitment to the Dayton Accords and supports international efforts for the country's continued European integration. Any property of Milorad Dodik within the U.S. jurisdiction is to be blocked, and U.S. persons, individuals or companies are prohibited from engaging in business transactions with him."

=== Third term (2022–2025) ===
==== 2022 general election ====
On 1 July 2022, Dodik announced his candidacy in the Republika Srpska general election, running for a third time as president of Republika Srpska.

Following the release of the preliminary results in the Republika Srpska election, opposition parties filed accusations of electoral fraud directly against Dodik, who they claimed had coordinated stuffing ballot boxes with thousands of illegal votes to put the Alliance of Independent Social Democrats (SNSD) ahead in the polls and that Jelena Trivić of the Party of Democratic Progress was the true winner of the Republika Srpska presidential election. As a result of the allegations, the Central Election Commission began a recount the ballots. When the Election Commission verified the preliminary results, they did not verify the Republika Srpska elections. However, on 27 October, officials confirmed Dodik's victory. The commission noted that while there were irregularities, none were on a level that would have changed the outcome of the election.

==== Tenure ====
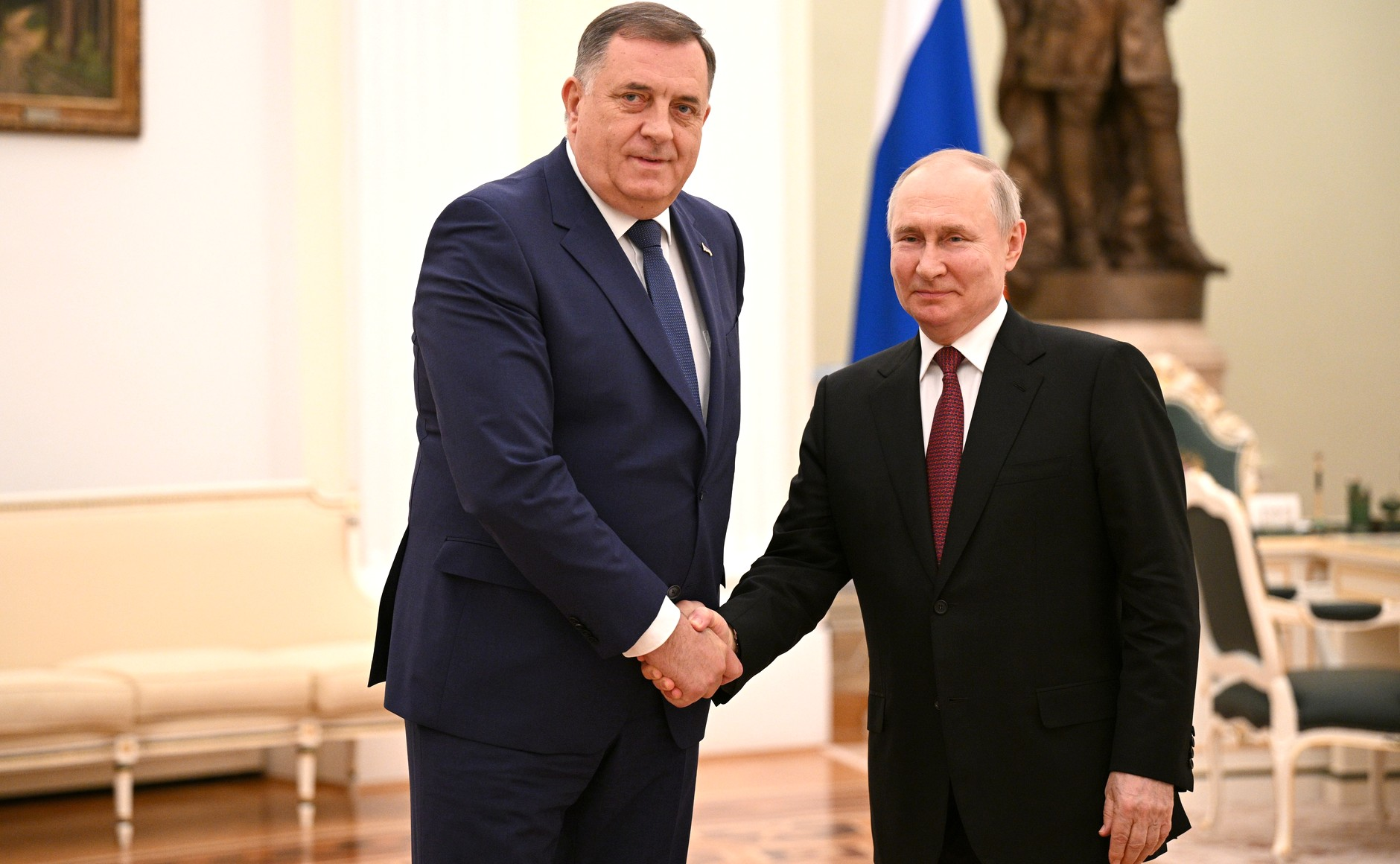
Dodik with Russian President Vladimir Putin, 23 May 2023

Dodik was sworn in as president on 15 November 2022 in the National Assembly of Republika Srpska, succeeding Željka Cvijanović.

On 23 November, Dodik asked the incumbent prime minister, Radovan Višković, to form a new Republika Srpska government. On 21 December 2022, the NSRS confirmed the appointment of Višković's cabinet.

On 8 January 2023, Dodik awarded Russian President Vladimir Putin in absentia with the entity's highest decoration, the Order of the Republika Srpska.

In March 2023, violence occurred in Banja Luka over a planned LGBT event and several human rights activists were assaulted by a few dozen men. Also in March, The United States Secretary of State Antony Blinken said that "Dodik's attacks on basic rights and freedoms in Republika Srpska show he is on President Putin's authoritarian path" and that the "State Department continues to advocate for the democratic and prosperous future that all citizens of Bosnia and Herzegovina deserve."

On 27 June 2023, the NSRS voted to suspend rulings by the Constitutional Court of Bosnia and Herzegovina and to stop publishing the High Representative's decrees and laws in the official gazette. Following this decision, High Representative Christian Schmidt annulled the two laws which the Assembly had adopted, citing that the decisions "directly violate the constitutional order of Bosnia and Herzegovina and the Dayton Peace Agreement."

Dodik condemned the 2023 Hamas-led attack on Israel and expressed his support for Israel in the ensuing war. The Palace of the Republic in Banja Luka was decorated with the Israeli flag on 8 October 2023.

On 26 March 2024, Christian Schmidt imposed a new set of changes to Bosnia and Herzegovina's election law, announcing the implementation of electronic vote-counting, electronic identification and digital voting stations at a limited number of locations in a pilot scheme. Dodik threatened that Serbs would block the work of the country's national government unless the election laws imposed by Schmidt were "annulled" and "Western ambassadors expelled from the country."

==== Indictment and trial ====
Dodik at the Moscow Kremlin less than two months after his first-instance conviction, 1 April 2025

In August 2023, the Prosecutor's Office of Bosnia and Herzegovina charged Dodik with defying decisions by the High Representative, facing a possible maximum sentence of five years in prison. High-ranking Bosnian Serb officials dismissed the indictment against Dodik as politically motivated, saying they would not recognise decisions by an "unconstitutional court and prosecution." On 16 October 2023, Dodik refused to enter a plea on the indictment at the first hearing, later telling reporters he could not understand the indictment.

On 5 February 2024, Dodik was officially put on trial. On 26 February 2025, he was convicted by the first-instance court and sentenced to one year imprisonment, and was also banned from performing the duties of the president of Republika Srpska for six years. Dodik refused to recognize the ruling and introduced laws barring federal law enforcement agencies from operating in Republika Srpska, prompting the Court of Bosnia and Herzegovina to issue arrest warrants against him and other senior officials of Republika Srpska for anti-constitutional conduct in March 2025. The court also requested the issuance of an international arrest warrant against Dodik and NSRS speaker Nenad Stevandić from Interpol.

Dodik has been able to travel abroad, having made visits to Serbia, Israel and Russia. Ultimately, Interpol rejected the request for the arrest warrant, deeming the persecution of him and Stevandić as politically motivated. On 23 April 2025, agents from the Bosnian State Investigation and Protection Agency tried to arrest Dodik at an office east of Sarajevo but were prevented by the Police of Republika Srpska.

On 4 July 2025, Dodik voluntarily appeared before the Court of Bosnia and Herzegovina. The hearing was conducted following a motion submitted by the Prosecutor’s Office of Bosnia and Herzegovina. Acting upon the motion, the Court issued a decision revoking the previously ordered arrest warrant against Dodik, replacing it with a precautionary measure only requiring him to report periodically to a designated state authority.

On 1 August 2025, the first-instance verdict against Dodik from February of that year was confirmed by the court's Appellate panel. On 6 August, the Central Election Commission ordered Dodik's removal as president of Republika Srpska, a decision which would take effect after an appeals period expired. On 12 August, the Bosnian state court commuted his one year prison sentence to a fine of 36,500 Bosnian marks. On 18 August, Dodik's appeal against the decision of the Central Election Commission was rejected and his mandate as Republika Srpska president was officially terminated, with the termination date marked as 12 June 2025. The National Assembly of Republika Srpska rejected the court's decision and supported Dodik as the president. However, the National Assembly eventually accepted the court's decision and elected Ana Trišić-Babić on 18 October 2025 to serve as acting president of Republika Srpska until the election of a new president in the early presidential elections scheduled for 23 November 2025.

==== Sanctions ====
The British government imposed sanctions on Dodik in April 2022, along with the United States in 2023, for allegedly undermining the territorial integrity of Bosnia and Herzegovina and the Dayton Peace Agreement. In September 2025, the Slovenian Government barred Dodik from entering the country over his refusal to relinquish the presidency of Republika Srpska despite a court order. In reprisal, the government of Republika Srpska barred entry to Slovenian president, Nataša Pirc Musar, and foreign affairs minister, Tanja Fajon.

In October 2025, the United States lifted the sanctions on Dodik, allegedly after several close allies of U.S. president Donald Trump pushed for a lifting of the sanctions, including MAGA influencer Laura Loomer and first-term Trump administration officials Rudy Giuliani and Michael Flynn. Sanctions were also lifted on Dodik's close allies, including high-ranking SNSD members Željka Cvijanović, Radovan Višković and Siniša Karan, as well as NSRS speaker Nenad Stevandić. In April 2026, Dodik filed a lawsuit against the U.S. government in Florida, alleging that sanctions against him were motivated by his open support for Trump.

== Post-presidency (2025–present) ==
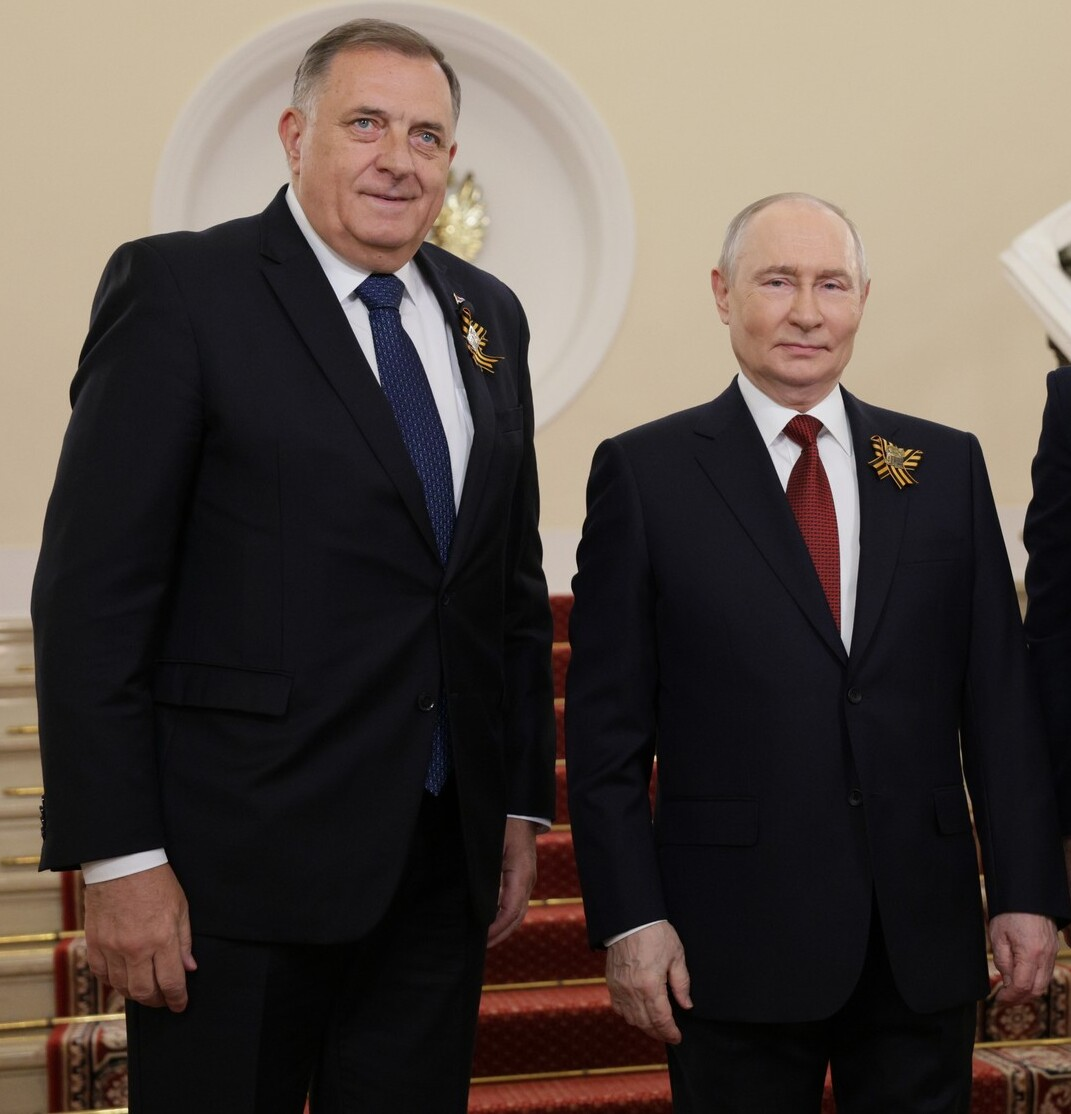
Dodik with Vladimir Putin at the 2026 Moscow Victory Day Parade

Dodik has remained the most powerful politician in Republika Srpska since the termination of his mandate. He retained leadership of the Alliance of Independent Social Democrats, and has undertaken international trips representing Republika Srpska in an unofficial capacity. In February 2026, Siniša Karan, a Dodik ally, won in the early presidential elections in Republika Srpska. Dodik's sponsorship of Prime Minister Savo Minić has been the cause of repeated controversies regarding his ability to serve in the office.

In the United States, he has solicited investment to Republika Srpska, particularly through infrastructure construction. In April 2026, Donald Trump Jr. visited Banja Luka as a guest of Dodik's son Igor. Dodik hired former U.S. national security advisor Michael Flynn as a lobbyist, and Flynn visited Banja Luka in March and May 2026.

On 5 February 2026, Dodik attended the National Prayer Breakfast in Washington, D.C. with Ana Trišić-Babić and Željka Cvijanović. On 1 May 2026, he was awarded a Leadership and Standing Up for Democracy Award by Judson University, a Baptist institution in Elgin, Illinois. His presence in Illinois caused protests by the local Bosniak community, but was defended by the University and former Illinois governor Rod Blagojevich, who spoke on a panel with him at Judson. After receiving the award, Dodik toured Serbian communities and churches in the Midwest.

== Views ==
=== Opinions on Tuzla and Markale ===
In 2009, Dodik stated that the Tuzla massacre was staged and questioned the Markale massacres in Sarajevo. The city of Tuzla filed charges against Dodik over these statements. The city of Sarajevo filed criminal charges against Dodik for abuse of power and inciting ethnic, racial and religious hatred.

The Office of the High Representative said Dodik denied the war crimes committed and stated that "When such skewed facts come from an official in a position of high responsibility, an official who is obliged to uphold the Dayton Peace Accords and cooperate with the Hague Tribunal, then they are particularly irresponsible and undermine not only the institutions responsible for upholding the rule of law, but the credibility of the individual himself".

=== Genocide and Srebrenica massacre denial ===
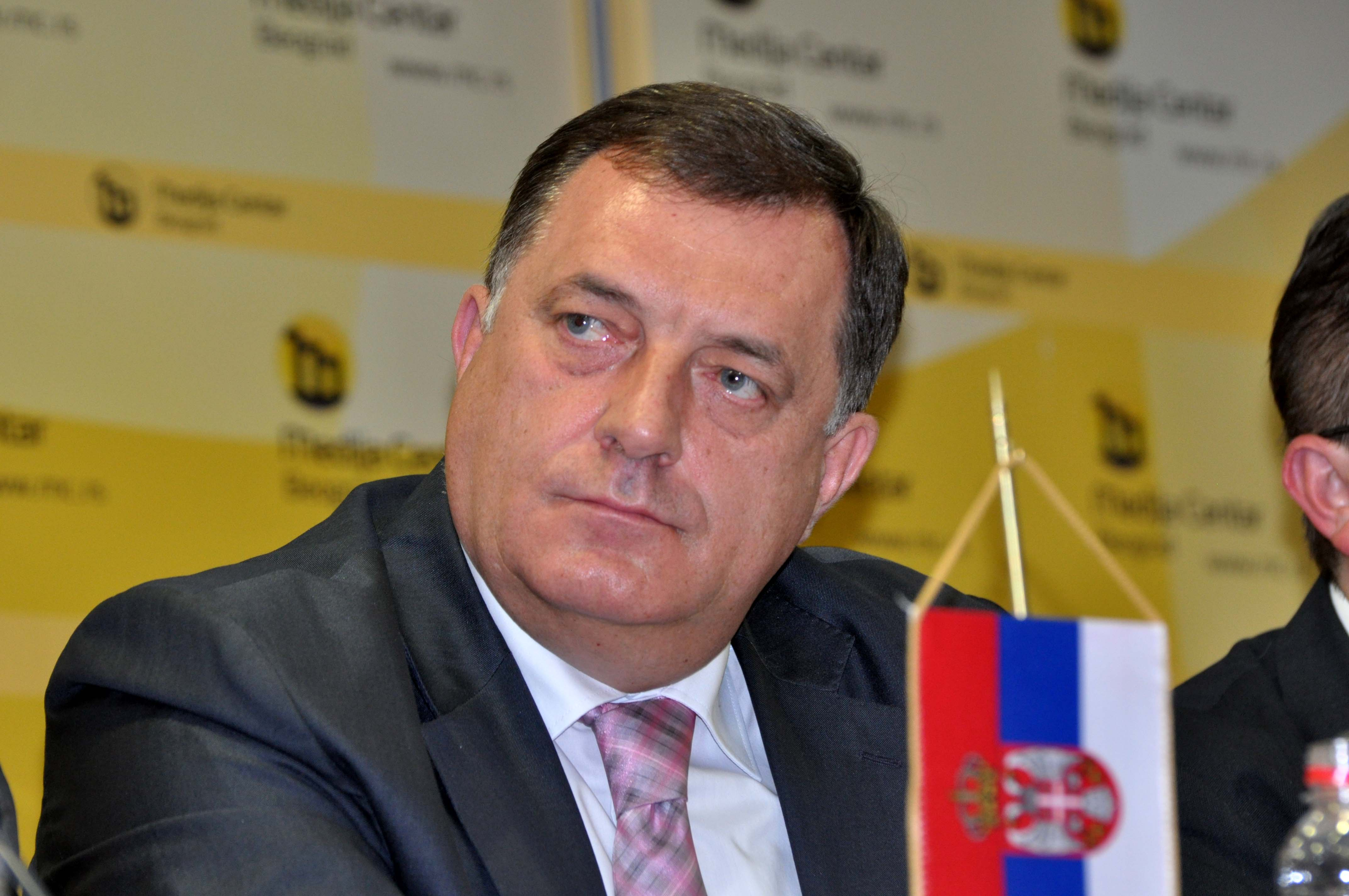
Dodik in 2016

Dodik has described the Srebrenica massacre as a "fabricated myth".

He stated in an interview with the Belgrade newspaper Večernje novosti in April 2010 that "we cannot and will never accept qualifying that event as a genocide", and disowned the 2004 Republika Srpska report which had acknowledged the scale of the killing and had apologised to the relatives of the victims, claiming that the report had been adopted because of pressure from the international community. Without substantiating the figure, he argued that the number of victims was 3,500 rather than the 7,000 accepted by the report, alleging that 500 listed victims were alive and that over 250 people buried in the Srebrenica Genocide Memorial in Potočari had died elsewhere. During the same month, on 10 April 2010, Dodik initiated a revision of the 2004 report saying that the numbers of killed were exaggerated and the report was manipulated by a former peace envoy. The Office of the High Representative responded and stated that: "The Republika Srpska government should reconsider its conclusions and align itself with the facts and legal requirements and act accordingly, rather than inflicting emotional distress on the survivors, torture history and denigrate the public image of the country".

On 12 July 2010, at the 15th anniversary of the Srebrenica massacre, Dodik declared that he acknowledged the killings that happened on the site, but did not regard what happened at Srebrenica as genocide, differing from the conclusions of the ICTY and of the International Court of Justice, stating that, "(i)f a genocide happened then it was committed against Serb people of this region where women, children and the elderly were killed en masse," referring to eastern Bosnia. In December 2010, Dodik condemned the Peace Implementation Council (PIC), an international community of 55 countries, for referring to the Srebrenica massacre as genocide. He used a variety of claims, espoused by other deniers and conspiracy theorists, such as that Srebrenica was, in fact, revenge for the 1993 Kravica attack and other Bosnian Muslim crimes against Serbs, confirmed or alleged.

In 2017, Dodik introduced legislation, effectively banning the teaching of the Srebrenica genocide and Sarajevo siege in Republika Srpska's schools, stating that it was "impossible to use here the textbooks ... which say the Serbs have committed genocide and kept Sarajevo under siege. This is not correct and this will not be taught here".

On 14 August 2018, again initiated by Dodik after his previous attempt in 2010, the National Assembly of Republika Srpska dismissed the 2004 report and decided for a new commission to be assembled to revise the report surrounding events in Srebrenica and the area around the town in July 1995. The international community immediately criticised this move.

The Humanitarian Law Center, in their report signed by 31 high-profile signatories, described this new development as "the culmination of more than a decade of genocide denial and historical revisionism by the SNSD government in Republika Srpska". The United States State Department issued a communique in which they criticized the move, describing it as "(a)ttempts to reject or amend the report on Srebrenica are part of wider efforts to revise the facts of the past war, to deny history, and to politicize tragedy".

Dodik again denied that the Srebrenica massacre was a genocide on his 2026 visit to Judson University, calling it "NATO propaganda."

=== Radovan Karadžić and Ratko Mladić ===
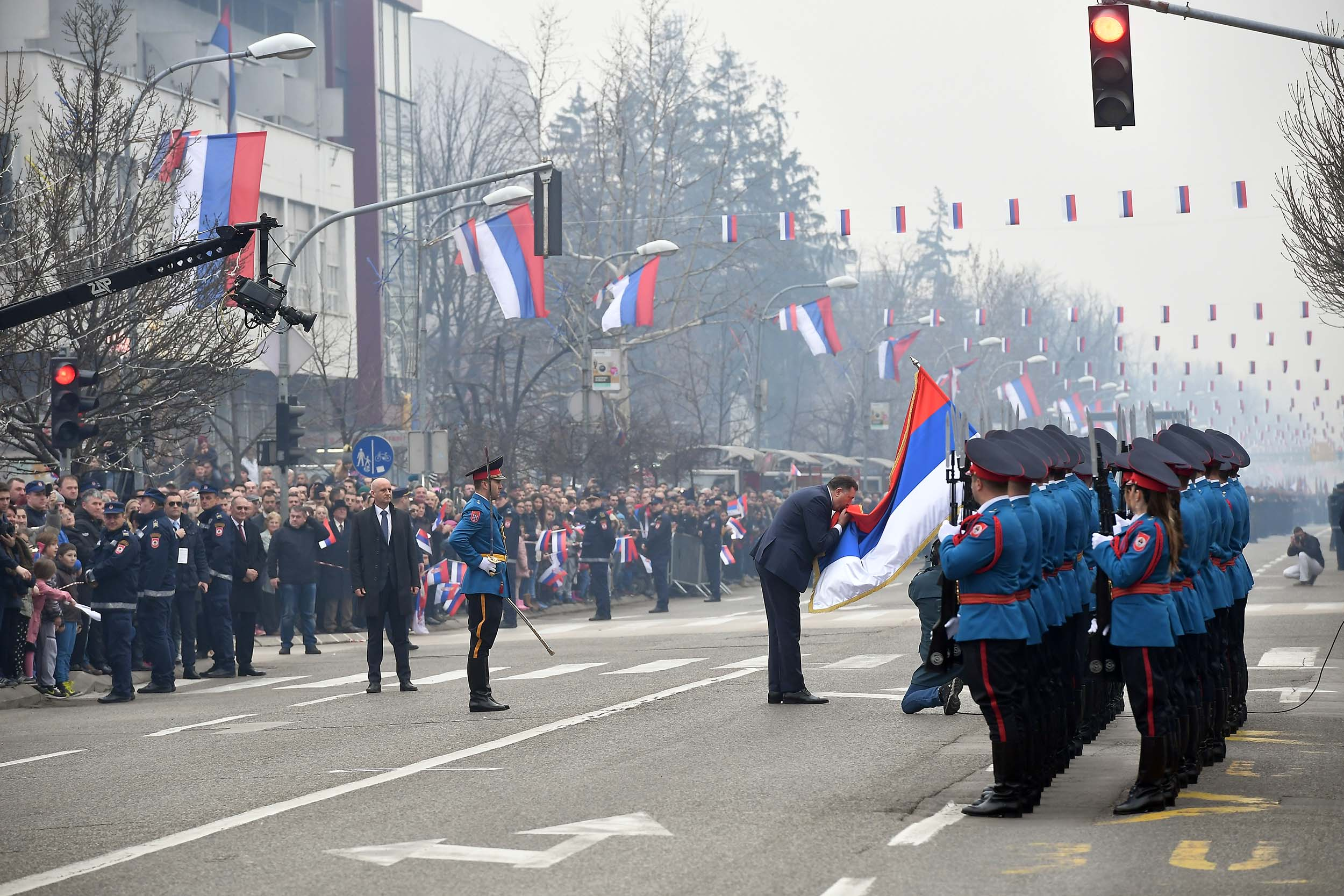
Dodik kissing the flag of Republika Srpska before the Republic Day parade in Banja Luka, 9 January 2018

In March 2016, a student dormitory in Pale was named in honour of the wartime Serb leader Radovan Karadžić. Dodik supported this act. The event took place only a few days before Karadžić was convicted for war crimes by the ICTY.

In December 2020, the plaque honouring Karadžić had to be removed after High Representative Inzko, with the help of Karadžić's daughter Sonja Karadžić-Jovičević, publicly called for its removal.

In February 2024, Dodik stated, "You mustn't forget Radovan Karadžić or Ratko Mladić. These are the people who, at a difficult moment, took the lead of this nation... and we are ready to give up our historical greatness just because someone said that they committed a crime," Dodik said in front of the gathered crowd. He claims that during the trial in The Hague, Karadžić was not proven to have committed a single crime and that he was found guilty "because he stood up for freedom." "What was done to them is a pure historical hoax... They made everything up," said Dodik. He added that his desire is to see the establishment of a "great Russia".

== Personal life ==
Milorad is married to Snježana Dodik, with whom he has two children. His nephew is Bosnian Serb businessman and football administrator Vico Zeljković.

In December 2024, Dodik had surgery in Belgrade to address problems with his oesophagus and stomach.

== Honours ==
- Order of the Republic of Serbia
- Order of the Republika Srpska
- Order of Friendship
- Order of Peter the Great with Sash – awarded by the National Committee for Social Awards of the Russian Federation for extraordinary contribution to enhancement of the Russian – Serbian cooperation
- Order of the Nemanjić dynasty
- Order of St. Sava
- Order of Saint Simeon the Myrrh-streaming
- Order of the Saint bishop Nikolaj
- Order of the Holy Priest-Martyr Peter, Metropolitan of Sarajevo and Dabar-Bosnia, golden (2023)
- Order of Alexander Nevsky
- Holy Cross of the Holy Sepulchre Guardians, awarded by Greek Orthodox Patriarch of Jerusalem
- Award of the International Foundation for the Unity of Orthodox Christian Nations
- Jabotinsky Award for Liberty, Israel

Honorary awards

- Honorary president of KK Partizan
- Honorary citizen of Drvar
- Honorary citizen of Gradiška
- Honorary citizen of Trebinje
- Honorary citizen of Prijedor

== Notes ==
Political offices
Preceded by Gojko Kličković	Prime Minister of Republika Srpska; 1998–2001	Succeeded by Mladen Ivanić
Preceded by Pero Bukejlović	Prime Minister of Republika Srpska; 2006–2010	Succeeded by Anton Kasipović (Acting)
Preceded by Rajko Kuzmanović	President of Republika Srpska; 2010–2018	Succeeded by Željka Cvijanović
Preceded by Mladen Ivanić	Serb member of the Presidency of Bosnia and Herzegovina; 2018–2022	Succeeded by Željka Cvijanović
Preceded by Bakir Izetbegović	Chairman of the Presidency of Bosnia and Herzegovina; 2018–2019	Succeeded by Željko Komšić
Preceded by Šefik Džaferović	Chairman of the Presidency of Bosnia and Herzegovina; 2020–2021	Succeeded by Željko Komšić
Preceded by Željka Cvijanović	President of Republika Srpska; 2022–2025	Succeeded by Ana Trišić-Babić (Acting)
