= Ana Trišić-Babić =

Bosnian Serb politician (born 1967)

President of Republika Srpska
- Acting
- In office 18 October 2025 – 17 February 2026
- Prime Minister: Savo Minić
- Vice President: Davor Pranjić; Ćamil Duraković
- Preceded by: Milorad Dodik
- Succeeded by: Siniša Karan

Deputy Minister of Foreign Affairs
- In office 11 January 2007 – 31 March 2015
- Minister: Sven Alkalaj; Zlatko Lagumdžija
- Preceded by: Anton Rill
- Succeeded by: Josip Brkić

Personal details
- Born: Ana Trišić; 9 February 1967 (age 59) Banja Luka, SR Bosnia and Herzegovina, SFR Yugoslavia
- Party: Alliance of Independent Social Democrats
- Spouse: Željko Babić
- Children: 2
- Education: University of Banja Luka (LLB)

Ana Trišić-Babić (née Trišić; Serbian: Ана Тришић-Бабић; born 9 February 1967) is a Bosnian Serb politician who served as the acting President of Republika Srpska from 2025 to 2026. A member of the Alliance of Independent Social Democrats, she previously served as deputy Minister of Foreign Affairs from 2007 to 2015.

For more than a decade, Trišić-Babić has been one of Bosnian Serb leader Milorad Dodik's closest advisers. She was appointed acting president of Republika Srpska by the National Assembly in October 2025, following Dodik's removal from the presidency as a result of his indictment and trial. She was succeeded by Siniša Karan in February 2026.

== Early life and education ==
Trišić-Babić was born on 9 February 1967 in Banja Luka, SFR Yugoslavia, present-day Bosnia and Herzegovina. She earned a degree in law from the University of Banja Luka in 1991. After graduating, she worked as an editor at BiG Radio in Banja Luka until 1995, and then as a correspondent for Radio Free Europe until 1996. Trišić-Babić later worked on projects for the Office of the High Representative and USAID, related to freedom of the press.

== Political career ==
A member of the Alliance of Independent Social Democrats (SNSD), Trišić-Babić started her government career in 1999, serving as an advisor at the Office of the President of Republika Srpska. Between 2001 and 2007, she was the assistant Minister for Bilateral Relations at the Ministry of Foreign Affairs of Bosnia and Herzegovina. From 2007 to 2015, she served as deputy Minister of Foreign Affairs in the cabinets of Nikola Špirić and Vjekoslav Bevanda. Additionally, Trišić-Babić was appointed chairperson of the NATO coordination team of the Council of Ministers of Bosnia and Herzegovina in January 2012.

Following the premature removal of Republika Srpska president Milorad Dodik from office by the Court of Bosnia and Herzegovina after rejecting his appeal in August 2025, the National Assembly of Republika Srpska initially rejected the court's decision and supported Dodik as the president. However, the National Assembly eventually accepted the court's decision and elected Trišić-Babić on 18 October 2025 to serve as acting president of Republika Srpska until the election of a new president in the early presidential elections scheduled for 23 November 2025.

Trišić-Babić was succeeded as president by fellow SNSD member Siniša Karan on 17 February 2026.

== Personal life ==
Trišić-Babić is married to Željko Babić and has two sons. She speaks English, German, French, and Russian fluently.

In 2020, Željko Babić, co-owner and director of the company Medietik, came under investigation over public procurement deals for medical equipment during the COVID-19 pandemic. According to the Republika Srpska Public Prosecutor's Office and media reports, the Health Insurance Fund of Republika Srpska (FZO RS) unlawfully bypassed regular tender procedures to award Medietik contracts worth over 21 million KM (€10.5 million) for medical supplies and 165 ventilators. Of the equipment delivered, 85 ventilators were later found to be unsuitable for treating patients. Prosecutors stated that these deals caused over 4 million KM (€2 million) in damages to the public budget, though the case has yet to reach a final court verdict.

Political offices
Preceded by Milorad Dodik	President of Republika Srpska (Acting); 2025–2026	Succeeded by Siniša Karan
