= Savo Minić =

Bosnian Serb politician (born 1974)

- Саво Минић
- Minić in 2026

President of Republika Srpska
- Incumbent
- Assumed office 16 November 2026
- Prime Minister: Anđelka Kuzmić (acting)
- Vice President: Igor Balukčić; Ramiz Salkić
- Preceded by: Siniša Karan

Prime Minister of Republika Srpska
- In office 2 September 2025 – 9 November 2026
- President: Ana Trišić-Babić (acting); Siniša Karan
- Preceded by: Radovan Višković
- Succeeded by: Anđelka Kuzmić (acting)

Personal details
- Born: 5 September 1974 (age 52) Bosanski Šamac, SR Bosnia and Herzegovina, SFR Yugoslavia
- Party: Alliance of Independent Social Democrats
- Children: 3
- Education: University of Banja Luka (LLB, LLM, LLD)

Savo Minić (Serbian: Саво Минић; born 5 September 1974) is a Bosnian Serb politician who has served as President of Republika Srpska since 2026. He previously served as Prime Minister of Republika Srpska from September 2025 to November 2026. A member of the Alliance of Independent Social Democrats (SNSD), he previously served as Minister of Agriculture, Forestry and Water Management in the government of Republika Srpska from 2022 to 2025.

== Education and early career ==
Savo Minić was born on 5 September 1974 in Bosanski Šamac, then part of the Socialist Republic of Bosnia and Herzegovina. He finished elementary school in Donja Dubica near Odžak and high school in Šamac and Bijeljina. He gained a bachelor's degree in 1999 at the University of Banja Luka's Faculty of Law. Minić passed the judicial exam in Serbia in 2003 and the bar exam in 2004. He additionally gained a master's degree in 2013 and a doctorate in 2018. He worked as a lawyer from 1999, and ran a private law practice in Šamac from 2004 to 2008.

== Political career ==
Minić served as the municipal mayor of Šamac for two terms, from 2008 to 2016. From 2017 to 2020, he worked as the director of the Agency for Agrarian Payments of the Ministry of Agriculture, Forestry and Water Management of Republika Srpska. During this time, opposition figures accused the agency of favoring politically affiliated individuals in subsidy distribution, which he denied. In 2020, he resigned from that position and became director of Kaldera Company in Laktaši, a company that was later placed under sanctions by the U.S. Office of Foreign Assets Control (OFAC), due to being part of "Milorad Dodik’s Network of Wealth Generating Companies".

From 2022 until 2025, Minić served as minister of Agriculture, Forestry and Water Management in the government of Republika Srpska.

In September 2025, Minić was appointed prime minister of Republika Srpska. His appointment as prime minister was considered illegal and unconstitutional, as he was proposed to serve by SNSD leader Milorad Dodik, whose mandate as president of Republika Srpska was terminated in August 2025 due to defying decisions by the High Representative, with the termination date marked as 12 June 2025. Due to the unconstitutionality of his mandate, Minić submitted his resignation on 16 March 2026. He was subsequently re-nominated by Siniša Karan, who had been elected president of Republika Srpska in the 2025–26 election, and was confirmed again as prime minister by the National Assembly the following day.

== President of Republika Srpska (2026–present) ==
Minić was sworn in as president of Republika Srpska in the National Assembly on 16 November 2026, succeeding Siniša Karan.

== Personal life ==
Minić is married and has three children. He has been a hunter and the president of the Hunters' Association of Republika Srpska since 2019.

He was the bestman of Gorica Dodik, Milorad Dodik's daughter, and her husband Pavle.

Political offices
Preceded by Siniša Karan	President of Republika Srpska; 2026–present	Incumbent
Preceded by Radovan Višković	Prime Minister of Republika Srpska; 2025–2026	Succeeded by Anđelka Kuzmić (acting)
