= Siniša Karan =

Bosnian Serb politician (born 1962)

- Синиша Каран
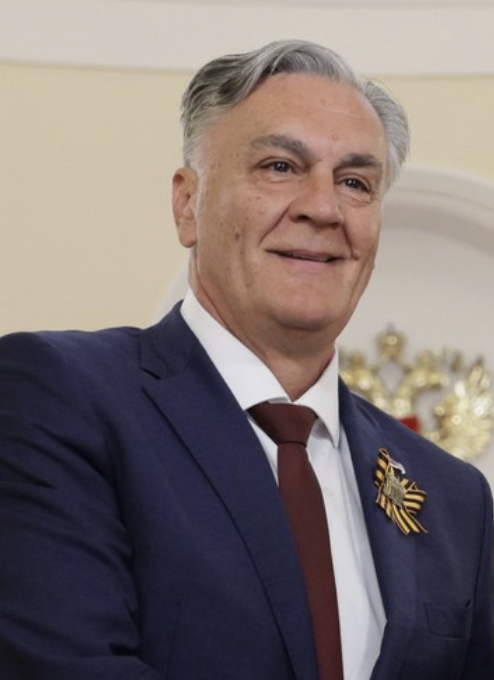
- Karan in 2026

President of Republika Srpska
- In office 17 February 2026 – 16 November 2026
- Prime Minister: Savo Minić; Anđelka Kuzmić (acting)
- Vice President: Davor Pranjić; Ćamil Duraković
- Preceded by: Ana Trišić-Babić (acting)
- Succeeded by: Savo Minić
Ministerial offices
Minister of Scientific-Technological Development and Higher Education of Republika Srpska
In office 2 September 2025 – 18 January 2026
Prime Minister	Savo Minić
Preceded by	Željko Budimir
Succeeded by	Draga Mastilović
Minister of Interior of Republika Srpska
In office 21 December 2022 – 2 September 2025
Prime Minister	Radovan Višković
Preceded by	Dragan Lukač
Succeeded by	Željko Budimir

Personal details
- Born: 17 May 1962 (age 64) Grabovac, PR Croatia, FPR Yugoslavia
- Party: Alliance of Independent Social Democrats
- Education: University of Sarajevo (BA); University of Banja Luka (LLM, PhD)

Siniša Karan (Serbian Cyrillic: Синиша Каран; born 17 May 1962) is a Bosnian Serb politician who served as President of Republika Srpska from February to November 2026. He previously served as Minister of Scientific-Technological Development and Higher Education of Republika Srpska from 2025 to 2026. A member of the Alliance of Independent Social Democrats, he also served as Minister of Interior of Republika Srpska from 2022 to 2025.

== Early life and education ==
Karan was born on 17 May 1962 in the village of Grabovac near Beli Manastir in FPR Yugoslavia, present-day Croatia. His father is an ethnic Serb from the village of Rašćani in the present-day Municipality of Tomislavgrad, and mother, an ethnic Croat, from Kupres. Karan finished elementary and high school in Kupres and earned a bachelor's degree in political science at the University of Sarajevo and a master's degree in law at the University of Banja Luka, where he also earned a PhD. He is a full professor at two private law faculties, at the Apeiron University of Banja Luka and the Independent University of Banja Luka.

== Career ==
From 1985 to 2008, Karan served as a policeman. He was a commander of the police station in Kupres, secretary of the Ministry of the Interior for Kupres and chief of the Criminal Department for the Sarajevo Centre. Following the Bosnian War, he was the chief of the Office for Crime Prevention at the Ministry of Interior of Republika Srpska, an entity of Bosnia and Herzegovina. He was also the chief of criminal investigations for the State Investigation and Protection Agency (SIPA) and the chief of its Financial Intelligence Department. From 2008, Karan served as advisor for security to the President of Republika Srpska and from 2009 to 2019, he was the President's general secretary. From January 2019, he was the general secretary of the Government of Republika Srpska.

On 21 December 2022, Karan was appointed Minister of the Interior of Republika Srpska. On 2 September 2025, he was appointed Minister of Scientific-Technological Development and Higher Education of Republika Srpska in the government of Savo Minić. Karan served as minister until January 2026.

=== 2025–26 Republika Srpska presidential election ===
Following the premature removal of then-President of Republika Srpska Milorad Dodik from office by the Court of Bosnia and Herzegovina in June 2025, the Central Election Commission of Bosnia and Herzegovina announced in August that early presidential elections for a shortened, ten-month term, were to be held on 23 November 2025. Initially refusing to take part in the election, Dodik and his party, the Alliance of Independent Social Democrats (SNSD) later confirmed their participation. On 30 September, Dodik announced Karan as the SNSD's candidate for the election.

In the election, Karan was initially elected president by a surprisingly small margin, obtaining 50.39% of the vote. The virtually unknown Serb Democratic Party candidate Branko Blanuša was second with 48.22%. Following the election, the opposition accused the SNSD of voter fraud, and called for a recount of all ballots cast in the cities of Doboj, Zvornik and Laktaši. In December 2025, the Central Election Commission decided to annul the election results in 17 municipalities at 136 polling stations, with the elections being repeated at those locations on 8 February 2026.

The repeated elections were also won by Karan, whose total vote share was 50.53%, compared to Blanuša's 48.09%.

=== President of Republika Srpska (2026) ===
Karan was sworn in as president of Republika Srpska in the National Assembly on 17 February 2026, succeeding acting president Ana Trišić-Babić.

Political offices
Preceded by Ana Trišić-Babić (Acting)	President of Republika Srpska; 2026	Succeeded by Savo Minić
