= Veterans' Organization of Republika Srpska =

Non-governmental organization

Veteran's Organization of Republika Srpska (Serbian: Борачка организација Република Српске / Boračka organizacija Republike Srpske) is a non-governmental organization in Republika Srpska founded in 1993 which gathers veterans of the Army of Republika Srpska who fought in the Bosnian War.

It is the largest non-governmental organization in the Republika Srpska and one of the largest in Bosnia and Herzegovina. In October 2007, the Government of Republika Srpska determined its status as an organization of special interest to the entity.

The main goal of the Veterans' Organization is to preserve Republika Srpska, improve the material and social position of veterans and nurture the tradition of the Army of Republika Srpska. These goals are defined in the Statute and Platform of the Veterans' Organization.
