= Radovan Višković =

Bosnian Serb politician (born 1964)

- Радован Вишковић
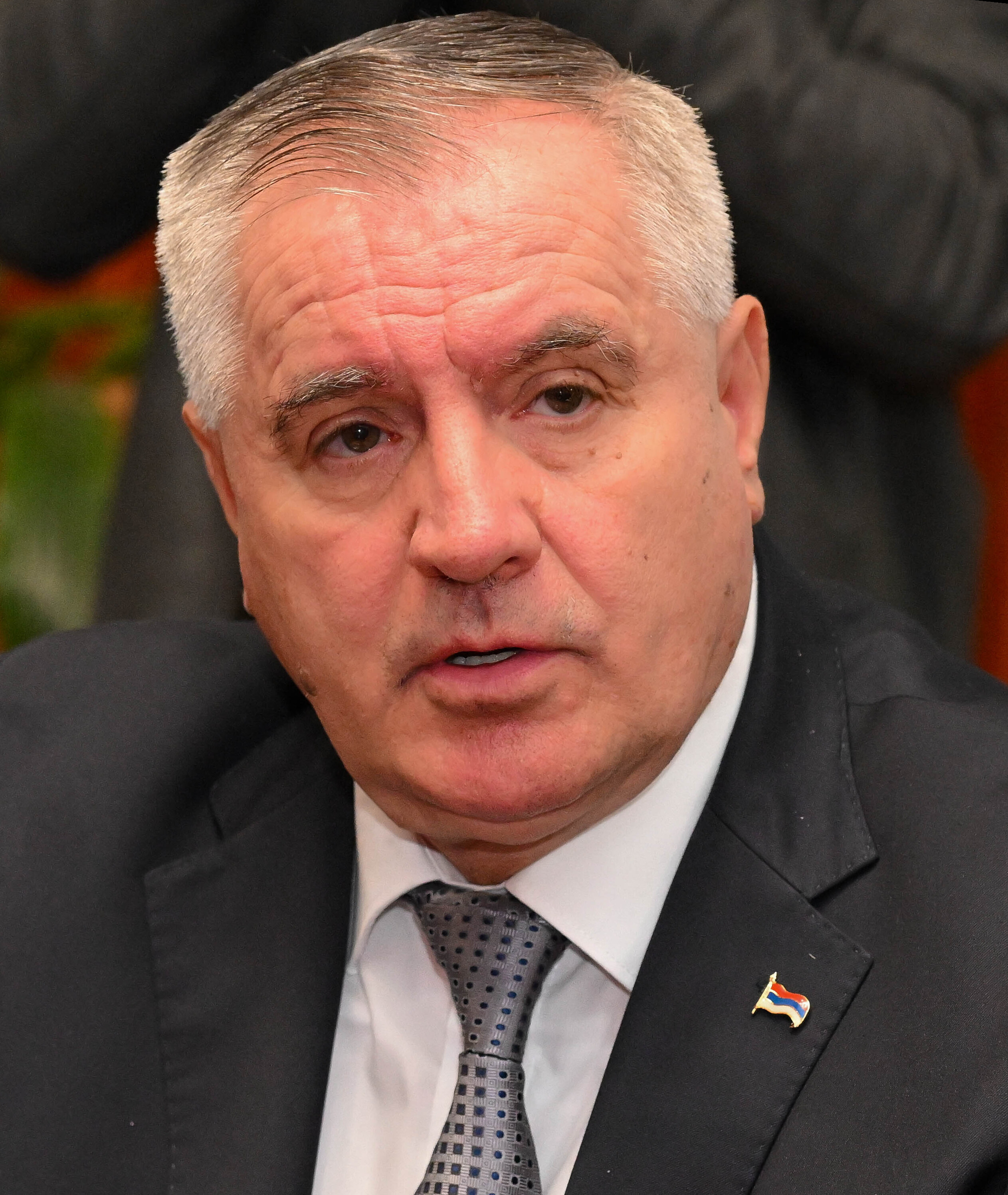
- Višković in 2025

Prime Minister of Republika Srpska
- In office 18 December 2018 – 2 September 2025
- President: Željka Cvijanović; Milorad Dodik
- Preceded by: Željka Cvijanović
- Succeeded by: Savo Minić
Parliamentary offices
Member of the National Assembly of Republika Srpska
In office 9 November 2006 – 18 December 2018
Constituency	3rd Electoral Unit RS

Personal details
- Born: 1 February 1964 (age 62) Vlasenica, SR Bosnia and Herzegovina, SFR Yugoslavia
- Party: Alliance of Independent Social Democrats
- Children: 2
- Education: University of Sarajevo

Radovan Višković (Serbian Cyrillic: Радован Вишковић; born 1 February 1964) is a Bosnian Serb politician who served as Prime Minister of Republika Srpska from 2018 to 2025. He is a member of the Alliance of Independent Social Democrats.

== Early life and education ==
Višković was born on 1 February 1964 in Buljevići, near Vlasenica (today in the municipality of Milići). He obtained the title of graduate traffic engineer at the Faculty of Transportation in Sarajevo (Road Transport) in 1990, then working there as assistant.

Višković completed postgraduate studies at the Faculty of Technology in Zvornik in 2005, and doctoral studies at the Faculty of Transportation in Doboj in 2015. He was then appointed assistant professor at the Faculty of Transportation in Doboj in the field of Transport Engineering, Road Traffic and Transport.

== Career ==
In July 1995, Lieutenant Višković worked as traffic assistant at the General Staff of the Army of Republika Srpska. According to the ICTY archive documents, on 13 July during the Srebrenica genocide, he was in contact with Colonel Rajko Krsmanović, traffic officer of convicted war criminal Radislav Krstić, about the transfer of captured Srebrenica Bosniaks (including the 700 captured in Sandići) to places such as Bratunac and Zvornik, where they were later shot. ICTY witnesses recall Višković meeting with Krsmanović right before the fall of Srebrenica, and later seeing him near the stadium in Nova Kasaba where captured people were detained. In 2020, a witness testified at the trial of former police officers Miodrag Josipović and Branimir Tešić on Srebrenica-related charges in Bosnia, saying that Višković offered him money to dig up a mass grave in Milići in 1996. Public media in Republika Srpska published the identity of the protected witness. Višković rebutted all allegations and announced lawsuits against the media and individuals who published the news.

After the war, Višković worked for the company "Bauxite" in Milići, as executive director for the transport sector. He began his political career in 2004 as a member of the Municipal Assembly of Milići, and in 2006, 2010, 2014 and 2018 he was elected as member of the National Assembly of Republika Srpska (NSRS). He was Chairman of the parliamentary group of the Alliance of Independent Social Democrats (SNSD).

=== Prime Minister of Republika Srpska (2018–2025) ===
On 2 November 2018, Milorad Dodik, the president of the SNSD announced that Višković would be his choice for the new prime pinister of Republika Srpska, succeeding Željka Cvijanović, who successfully ran for the position of President of Republika Srpska. In March 2025, the Court of Bosnia and Herzegovina issued arrest warrants against Višković, Republika Srpska president Milorad Dodik, and NSRS speaker Nenad Stevandić for anti-constitutional conduct regarding Dodik's refusal to serve his imprisonment following his conviction for defying the High Representative for Bosnia and Herzegovina. In July 2025, Višković and Stevandić voluntarily appeared before the Court of Bosnia and Herzegovina. The hearing was conducted following a motion submitted by the Prosecutor’s Office of Bosnia and Herzegovina. Acting upon the motion, the Court issued a decision revoking the previously ordered arrest warrant against the two of them, replacing it with a precautionary measure only requiring both of them to report periodically to a designated state authority.

On 18 August 2025, Višković resigned as prime minister of Republika Srpska. Subsequently, Dodik announced his intent to appoint Višković as director of Autoputevi Republike Srpske, a state-owned enterprise engaged in the construction of new highways and expressways in Republika Srpska. The National Assembly confirmed his resignation on 22 August.

==== Sanctions ====
On 31 July 2023, the United States Office of Foreign Assets Control imposed sanctions on Višković under Executive Order 14033 for threatening regional security, peace, cooperation, and undermining the Dayton Agreement related to the Western Balkans.

In October 2025, the United States lifted sanctions on Milorad Dodik, allegedly after several close allies of U.S. president Donald Trump pushed for a lifting of the sanctions, including MAGA influencer Laura Loomer and first-term Trump administration officials Rudy Giuliani and Michael Flynn. Sanctions were also lifted on Dodik's close allies, including Višković and fellow high-ranking SNSD members Željka Cvijanović and Siniša Karan, as well as NSRS speaker Nenad Stevandić.

== Personal life ==
Višković is married and has two children.

Political offices
Preceded by Željka Cvijanović	Prime Minister of Republika Srpska; 2018–2025	Succeeded by Savo Minić
