= 2025–26 Republika Srpska presidential election =

Subnational election in Bosnia and Herzegovina

- 23 November 2025 (Note: Elections at one polling station in the village of Donji Korićani were conducted on 30 November 2025 due to severe weather conditions.); 8 February 2026 (repeat in 17 municipalities)
- Turnout: 35.77% (▼19.16 pp)
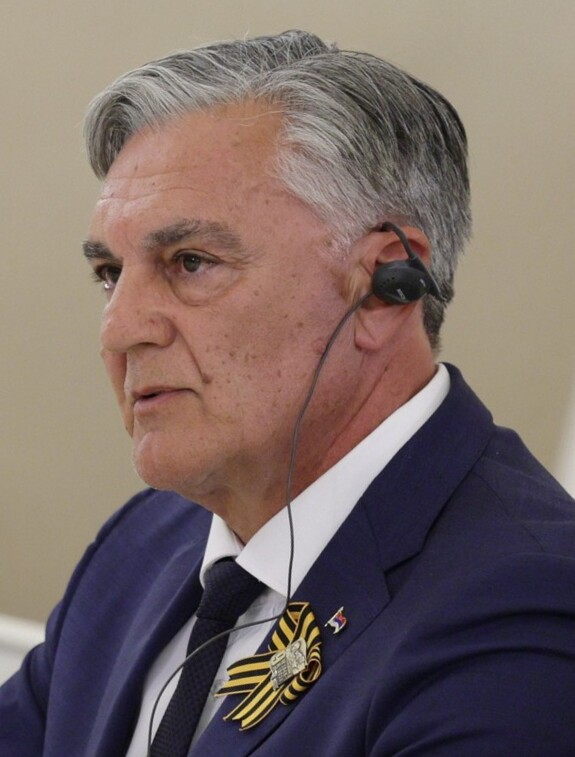

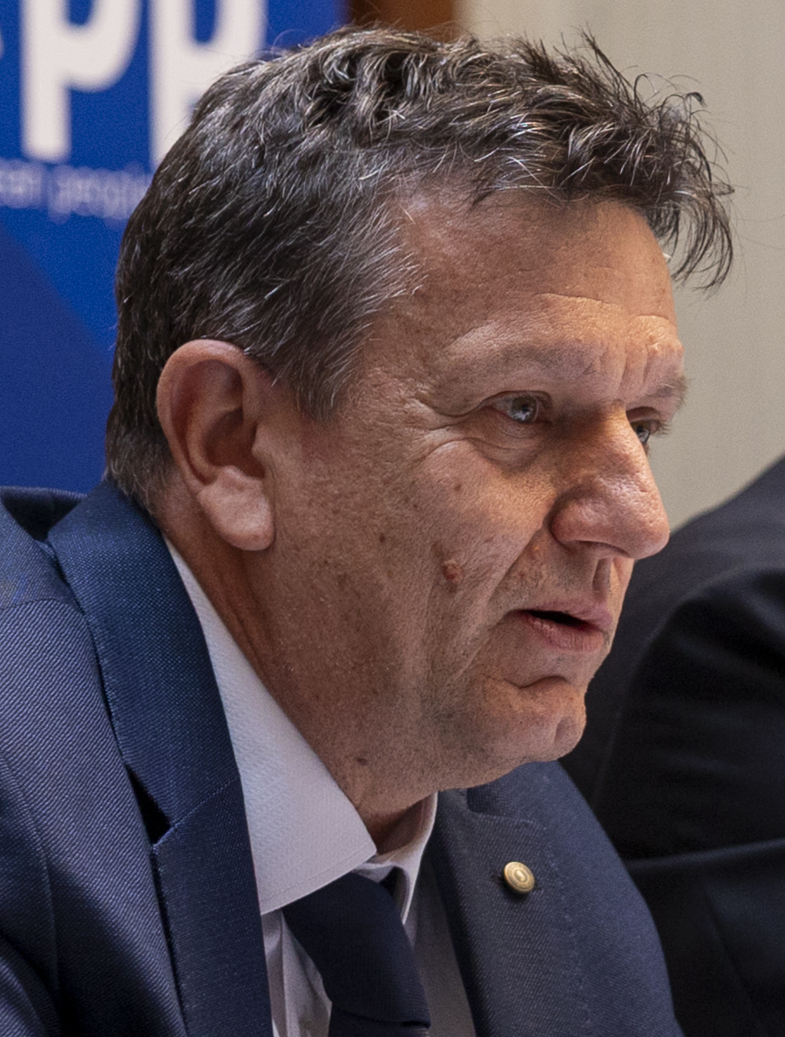
| Candidate | Siniša Karan | Branko Blanuša |
| Party | SNSD | SDS |
| Popular vote | 224,382 | 213,512 |
| Percentage | 50.53% | 48.09% |
- Results by municipality.
President before election
Ana Trišić-Babić (acting)
SNSD
Elected President
Siniša Karan
SNSD

Early presidential elections were held in Republika Srpska, an entity of Bosnia and Herzegovina, on 23 November 2025, and repeated ones in 17 municipalities on 8 February 2026. The elections were announced by the Central Election Commission of Bosnia and Herzegovina after the premature removal of then-President of Republika Srpska Milorad Dodik from office by the Court of Bosnia and Herzegovina on 12 June 2025. Dodik and his party, the Alliance of Independent Social Democrats (SNSD), rejected the court's decision and initially refused to take part in the election. However, the SNSD later confirmed that it would participate.

The November election was initially won by SNSD member Siniša Karan, with 50.39% of the vote. Karan defeated the Serb Democratic Party candidate Branko Blanuša, who received 48.22% of the vote. It was the seventh consecutive victory for a SNSD candidate in the presidential elections. Despite being a virtual unknown, Blanuša lost by a small margin and won in Banja Luka and Bijeljina, the two biggest cities in Republika Srpska. The opposition accused the SNSD of voter fraud. In December 2025, the Central Election Commission decided to annul the election results in 17 municipalities at 136 polling stations, with the elections being repeated at those locations on 8 February 2026.

The repeated elections were also won by Karan, whose total vote share was 50.53%, compared to Blanuša's 48.09%.

== Background ==
In February 2025, Bosnian Serb leader Milorad Dodik was convicted by the Court of Bosnia and Herzegovina in a first-instance verdict and was sentenced to one-year imprisonment, and was also banned from performing the duties of the president of Republika Srpska for six years due to anti-constitutional conduct. Dodik refused to recognize the ruling and introduced laws barring federal law enforcement agencies from operating in Republika Srpska, prompting the Court of Bosnia and Herzegovina to issue arrest warrants against him and other senior officials of Republika Srpska in March 2025.

On 4 July 2025, Dodik voluntarily appeared before the Court of Bosnia and Herzegovina. The hearing was conducted following a motion submitted by the Prosecutor's Office of Bosnia and Herzegovina. Acting upon the motion, the Court issued a decision revoking the previously ordered arrest warrant against Dodik, replacing it with a precautionary measure only requiring him to report periodically to a designated state authority.

On 1 August 2025, the first-instance verdict against Dodik from February of that year was confirmed by the court's Appellate panel. On 6 August, the Central Election Commission of Bosnia and Herzegovina ordered Dodik's removal as president of Republika Srpska, a decision which would take effect after an appeals period expired. On 12 August, the Bosnian state court commuted his one year prison sentence to a fine of 36,500 Bosnian marks. On 18 August, Dodik's appeal against the decision of the Central Election Commission was rejected and his mandate as Republika Srpska president was officially terminated, with the termination date marked as 12 June 2025, due to the Bosnian state court's verdict becoming legally binding on that day. The National Assembly of Republika Srpska rejected the court's decision and supported Dodik as the president.

== Candidates ==
The Central Election Commission announced that early presidential elections for a shortened, ten-month term, were to be held on 23 November 2025.

Dodik, who is also the leader of the Alliance of Independent Social Democrats (SNSD), the largest party in the entity, said that the SNSD would not participate in the election. He later changed his stance, stating that there is "no problem with the SNSD having a candidate in the elections." The SNSD eventually confirmed that it would participate in the election, and on 30 September, Dodik announced that Siniša Karan would be its candidate in the election.

The largest opposition party, the Serb Democratic Party (SDS) supported the participation in the election. Minor opposition leaders, Jelena Trivić of the People's Front and Nebojša Vukanović of For Justice and Order, announced that they would support the SDS candidate in the election. On 28 September 2025, the SDS announced the candidacy of Branko Blanuša, a university professor, for president of Republika Srpska.

Draško Stanivuković, the leader of the second largest opposition party, the Party of Democratic Progress (PDP), said his party would also boycott the election, and reiterated this position after both the SNSD and the SDS announced their candidates. However, by the end of October, Stanivuković and the PDP decided to support Blanuša.

== Results ==
Karan of the SNSD narrowly won the election, securing some 50.5% of the vote. He secured victory in 45 cities and municipalities, out of 64 including three municipalities out of six in Istočno Sarajevo. Conversely, Blanuša won 19 polities, including Banja Luka, Republika Srpska's de facto capital and largest city. Additionally, Blanuša won in Bijeljina, the entity's second-largest city, and initially secured a narrow victory in Prijedor, the third-largest one; however, it eventually voted for Karan in the repeat election.

| Candidate | Party | Votes | % |
|---|---|---|---|
| Siniša Karan | Alliance of Independent Social Democrats | 224,382 | 50.53 |
| Branko Blanuša | Serb Democratic Party | 213,512 | 48.09 |
| Dragan Đokanović | Alliance for New Politics | 2,028 | 0.46 |
| Nikola Lazarević | Ecological Party of Republika Srpska | 1,660 | 0.37 |
| Igor Gašević | Independent | 1,364 | 0.31 |
| Slavko Dragičević | Independent | 1,068 | 0.24 |
| Total | | 444,014 | 100.00 |
| Valid votes | | 444,014 | 98.19 |
| Invalid votes | | 7,323 | 1.62 |
| Blank votes | | 882 | 0.20 |
| Total votes | | 452,219 | 100.00 |
| Registered voters/turnout | | 1,264,366 | 35.77 |
Source: CEC

== Aftermath ==
Following the results, Hungarian Prime Minister Viktor Orbán, a close ally of Dodik, congratulated Karan and the SNSD on their victory. On the other hand, the opposition in Republika Srpska accused the ruling SNSD of electoral fraud, and called for a recount of all ballots cast in the cities of Doboj, Zvornik and Laktaši. On 24 December 2025, the Central Election Commission of Bosnia and Herzegovina decided to annul the election results in 17 municipalities at 136 polling stations, with elections being repeated there on 8 February 2026. They stated that numerous irregularities were recorded and that, to protect the integrity of the electoral process, it was necessary to annul the election results.

Following the repeated elections and Karan's victory, Blanuša conceded and thanked his supporters. Serbia's president Aleksandar Vučić, Israeli prime minister Benjamin Netanyahu and Hungarian prime minister Orbán congratulated Karan after the repeated election results.

Karan was sworn in as president of Republika Srpska in the National Assembly on 17 February 2026, succeeding acting president Ana Trišić-Babić.
