= Alliance of Independent Social Democrats =

Bosnian Serb political party

Alliance of Independent Social Democrats Савез независних социјалдемократа Savez nezavisnih socijaldemokrata
- Abbreviation: SNSD (СНСД)
- Leader: Milorad Dodik
- Founded: 10 March 1996; 30 years ago
- Headquarters: Kralja Petra II Karađorđevića 15, Banja Luka
- Youth wing: Young Social Democrats
- Women's wing: Active Woman Social Democratic
- Membership: 192,707
- Ideology: Social democracy; Populism; Left-conservatism; Serbian nationalism; Russophilia; Euroscepticism; Formerly: Bosnian confederalism; Pro-Europeanism
- Political position: Centre-left to left-wing
- International affiliation: Socialist International (2008–2012); For the Freedom of Nations! (since 2024)
- HoP BiH: 3 / 15
- HoR BiH: 6 / 42
- HoP FBiH: 2 / 80
- HoR FBiH: 0 / 98
- NA RS: 35 / 83
- Mayors: 48 / 145

Party flag

Website
- www.snsd.org
- Politics of Bosnia and Herzegovina; Political parties; Elections; A: The party is also described as right-wing, centre-left economically, left-conservative, right-wing nationalist, or a "centre-left party but simultaneously extremely radical right-wing".

The Alliance of Independent Social Democrats (Serbian: Савез независних социјалдемократа, СНСД, romanized: Savez nezavisnih socijaldemokrata, SNSD) is a Serb nationalist political party in Bosnia and Herzegovina. Founded in 1996, it is the governing party in Republika Srpska. As of 2026, the party's vice-president Željka Cvijanović is the member of the Presidency of Bosnia and Herzegovina, while party member Siniša Karan is serving as the president of Republika Srpska. SNSD member Savo Minić is also the prime minister of Republika Srpska.

The creation of the SNSD can be traced back to the Independent Members of Parliament Group, which eventually grew to become the Party of Independent Social Democrats. During this time, the party served as the only opposition to the dominance of the ultra-nationalist Serb Democratic Party (SDS), which was led by Radovan Karadžić for the majority of the 1990s. The SNSD was seen as a moderate and non-extremist alternative to the SDS, with many of its members, including its leader Milorad Dodik, being part of the former non-nationalist and multi-ethnic Union of Reform Forces of Yugoslavia.

The SNSD's first real electoral success was recorded in 2006, where it won 41 of the 83 seats in the National Assembly of Republika Srpska, attracting 44.95% of the popular vote. Since then, the party has gradually abandoned its reformist ideology for more assertive advocacy of Serbian nationalism, threatening the secession of Republika Srpska from the rest of Bosnia and Herzegovina numerous times. This has also led to the party being expelled from the Socialist International in 2012 for "continuing to espouse a nationalist and extremist line".

== History ==
=== 1991–1996 ===
The party grew out of the Independent Members of Parliament Caucus (IMPC), known as "the club", of the National Assembly of Republika Srpska (NSRS) in 1996. The club was in opposition to the Serb Democratic Party (SDS) during the Bosnian War (1992–96). The IMPC was established from the caucus of ethnic Serb members of the Parliament of the Socialist Republic of Bosnia and Herzegovina elected in 1990 from the election list of the Union of Reform Forces. The Serb members of the Parliament of SR Bosnia and Herzegovina, the majority of the Serb Democratic Party (SDS), including the members of the IMPC, established the Assembly of the Serb People of Bosnia and Herzegovina on 24 October 1991 (later renamed National Assembly of the Republika Srpska), following the majority of the parliament (mostly Croats and Bosniaks) approved the "Memorandum on Sovereignty" on 15 October 1991. In 1992, the Bosnian parliament held an independence referendum which led to the declaration of the Republic of Bosnia and Herzegovina.

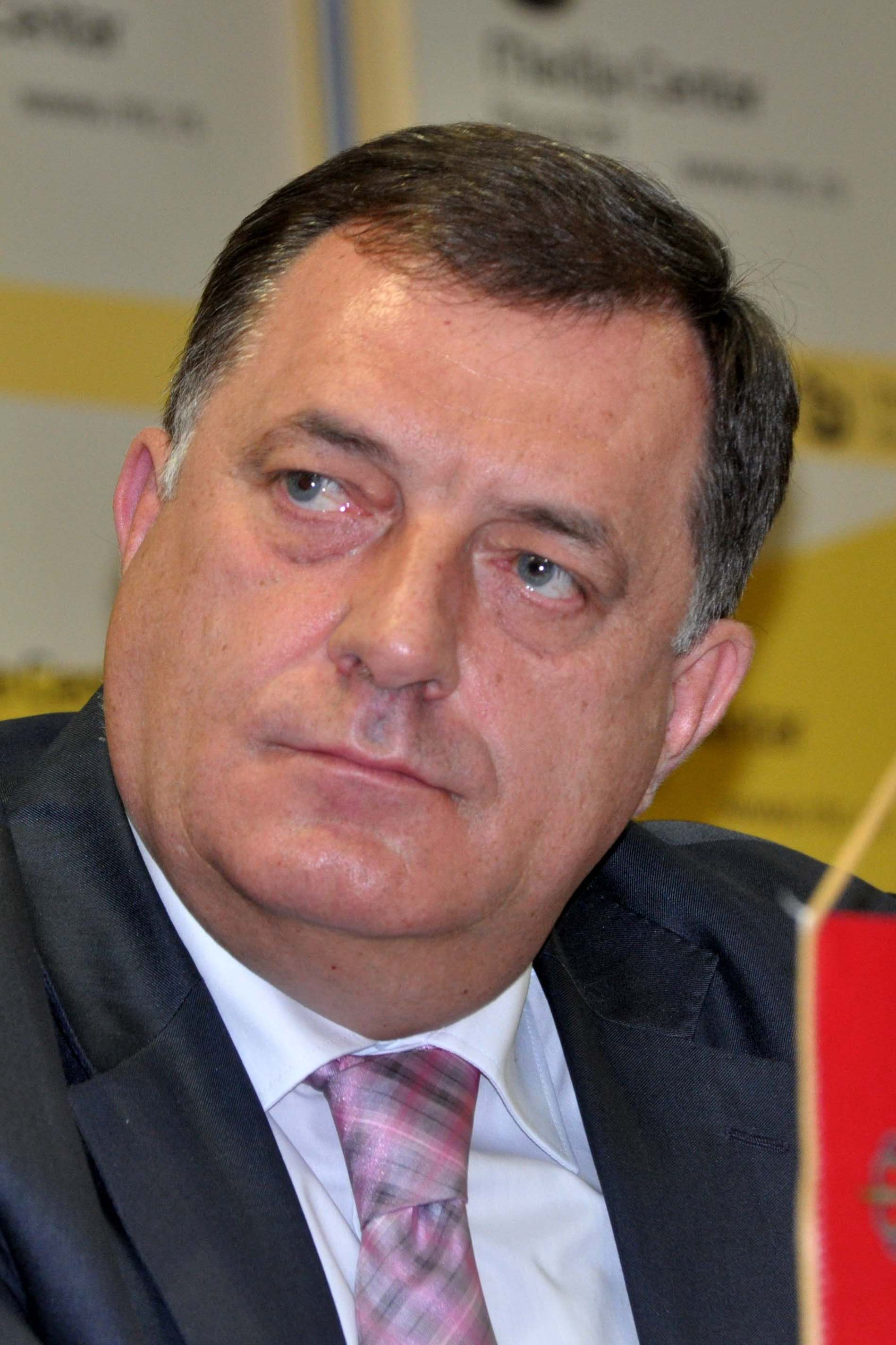
Milorad Dodik has been the party's president since its foundation in 1996

The absolute majority of the newly founded NSRS was from the SDS. The IMPC was the only parliamentary opposition from the founding of the National Assembly through the first post-war elections in September 1996. The Party of Independent Social Democrats (SNSD) participated in the elections in the "Union for Peace and Progress" coalition along with the Socialist Party of RS (SPRS) and a minor party. The club and later party (SNSD) was chaired by Milorad Dodik.

=== 1997–2004 ===
By the time of the next local elections in 1997, about twenty municipal committees had been formed. It ran independently in 24 municipalities of the Republic of Srpska, mainly in Krajina and Posavina. In 1997, there was a split in the Serb Democratic Party, in which Biljana Plavšić, the president of Repubika Srpska left the party following internal clashes. The People’s Assembly of Republika Srpska was dissolved. Parliamentary elections were held simultaneously with local elections. The Party of Independent Social Democrats received twice as much support compared to the previous elections just a year earlier. The then western-backed Plavšić nominated Dodik for Prime Minister and he was elected in the January 1998 elections, largely being seen as a moderate. In the party's early years it was active in the "Sloga" (unity) coalition with Plavšić's Serb National Alliance and the Socialist Party, whose leader at the time was Živko Radišić. In 1998, another parliamentary election was held. In the elections for the People’s Assembly of Republika Srpska, the Party of Independent Social Democrats won 6 parliamentary seats.

1999 was marked by difficulties in the region, including the NATO bombing of Yugoslavia and internal strife with the blockade of the work of the Government by the People’s Assembly, a vote of no-confidence and the removal of Nikola Poplašen from the post of President of Republika Srpska by the High Representative Carlos Westendorp. Meanwhile, the government led by Dodik received significant support from international institutions.

In December 1999, the Social Liberal Party of Republika Srpska merged into the SNSD. After local elections in 2000 Nikola Špirić's Democratic Socialist Party (DSP) merged into it in 2001. The SNSD then changed its name to the "Alliance of Independent Social Democrats", keeping its old abbreviation. DSP was a splinter party of the SPRS. At the Unifying Congress in May 2002, it elected Milorad Dodik as president of the Alliance of Independent Social Democrats, with Nebojša Radmanović as president of the Executive Committee. Vinko Đuragić's New Workers' Party also joined the Alliance of Independent Social Democrats. In August 2002, the New Labour Party of Republika Srpska merged into the SNSD.

In the elections held on 5 October 2002, the Alliance of Independent Social Democrats won the largest number of parliamentary seats since its creation, receiving 19 seats in the People’s Assembly of Republika Srpska, 3 deputies in the Parliament of Bosnia and Herzegovina, and 1 deputy in the Parliamentary Assembly of the Federation of Bosnia and Herzegovina. The Alliance of Independent Social Democrats received 7 seats in the Council of Peoples of Republika Srpska and 3 seats in the Council of Peoples of the Federation of Bosnia and Herzegovina. Moderate political parties were offered a partnership to form a new government, but the Party of Democratic Progress decided to remain in the pact with the nationalist parties, so the Alliance of Independent Social Democrats accepted the role of the strongest opposition party, not only in the Republic of Srpska but throughout Bosnia and Herzegovina.

In this period, the party launched a campaign to collect signatures, with the goal of abolishing conscription into the army and demilitarization of the country.

In the 2004 elections, with around 125,000 votes, the Alliance of Independent Social Democrats became the strongest party in Republika Srpska and the second in terms of votes in Bosnia and Herzegovina. 17 mayor positions were won, 15 of which were in Republika Srpska, and 2 in the Federation of Bosnia and Herzegovina. The number of council seats, compared to the previous local elections four years earlier was much higher, and they were won in all candidate municipalities in Republika Srpska, and 9 municipalities in the Federation of Bosnia and Herzegovina. After the establishment of municipal assemblies, the Alliance of Independent Social Democrats has 22 municipal presidents and a larger number of deputy mayors and vice presidents of municipal assemblies.

The end of 2004 was marked by the resignation of the republican government headed by Dragan Mikerević. After an unsuccessful two-year mandate, the Government resigns, and the political parties of the Republic of Srpska reach an Agreement on coordinated political action, to define the strategic relationship towards the constitutional arrangement and upcoming reforms: police and defence.

=== 2006–present: Breakthrough and rule ===
At the beginning of 2006, the previous prime minister of the Republic of Srpska, Pero Bukejlović, resigned. Ten days after that, on 26 January 2006, the president of the Republic of Srpska, Dragan Čavić, asked Milorad Dodik to form a new government, in which, according to the Constitution, there are 16 ministers: eight Serbs, five Bosniaks and three Croats. The Parliament of Republika Srpska supported the appointment of Dodik as Prime Minister on 28 February 2006.

The Alliance of Independent Social Democrats achieved their breakthrough in the 2006 general elections in Bosnia and Herzegovina. Nebojša Radmanović was elected as the Serb member of the Presidency of Bosnia and Herzegovina. In the House of Representatives of Bosnia and Herzegovina, the Alliance of Independent Social Democrats won 7 seats with 269,468 votes ahead of the Party of Democratic Action with 238,474 (9 seats) and the Party for Bosnia and Herzegovina with 219,477 votes (8 seats). Milan Jelić became the President of Republika Srpska (271,022 votes, 48.87%). The party won 41 out of 83 parliamentary seats in the People’s Assembly of Republika Srpska, and Milorad Dodik, the president of the Alliance of Independent Social Democrats, became the representative for the composition of the new Republika Srpska government. In the House of Representatives of the Federation of Bosnia and Herzegovina, the Alliance of Independent Social Democrats won 1 place with 12,564 votes (1.46%). The Alliance of Independent Social Democrats won 3 out of 25 seats in the Assembly of Canton 10 in the Federation of Bosnia and Herzegovina (3,654 votes, 11.99%).

In the General Elections of 2010, the Alliance of Independent Social Democrats repeated their good result from 2006, and at all levels defeated the united opposition in the coalition Zajedno za Srpska (Serb Democratic Party-Party of Democratic Progress-Serb Radical Party of Republic of Srpska).

The joint candidate of the "Alliance of Independent Social Democrats-Democratic People's Alliance-Socialist Party" coalition for the Serb member of the Presidency of Bosnia and Herzegovina, Nebojša Radmanović, received 295,629 votes, i.e. 48.92% of the total number of valid votes. The most significant opponent, the candidate of the Zajedno za Srpska coalition, Mladen Ivanić, received 285,951 votes, or 47.31% of valid votes. A large number of invalid ballots, and a small difference between the two most important candidates, resulted in a complaint by Mladen Ivanić and his Party of Democratic Progress about irregularities during the counting of ballots. The Central Election Commission put an end to such doubts by recognizing the election results.

Milorad Dodik, the candidate of the coalition "Alliance of Independent Social Democrats-Democratic People's Alliance-Socialist Party" for the president of Republika Srpska achieved a convincing victory, receiving the support of 50.52% of voters, i.e. 319,618 valid votes.

In the elections for the People’s Assembly of the Republic of Srpska, the party won 38% of the valid votes cast (240,727 votes) and received 37 parliamentary mandates, which was enough for the party to preserve the parliamentary majority in the coalition with the Democratic People's Alliance and the Socialist Party.

In the elections for the Parliamentary Assembly of Bosnia and Herzegovina, the party in the Republic of Srpska won 43.30% of the votes or 8 representatives.

The 2014 general elections saw the SNSD enter the race with a coalition of smaller parties; the Democratic People's Alliance and the Socialist Party. The SNSD became the main ruling party of Republika Srpska for the third consecutive time, gaining 29 seats in the Assembly with Dodik re-elected.

After the 2018 general elections, for the Serb member of the Presidency, Dodik received a record number of votes, i.e. 368,210 votes or 53.88%, while candidate Alliance for Victory Mladen Ivanić received 292,065 or 42.74%. In the People’s Assembly of Republika Srpska, SNSD remained the strongest political entity with 218,201 (31.87%) votes and 28 seats.

== Ideology ==
Reflecting a trend in Eastern Europe for centre-left parties, it has been characterized as a social-democratic party with left-leaning views on fiscal issues, while having more conservative views on social issues. Since the late 2000s, the party has gradually abandoned its reformist ideology and confederalism for Russophilia and a more aggressive advocacy of Serbian nationalism and separatism, threatening a proposed secession of Republika Srpska from the rest of Bosnia and Herzegovina numerous times. This has also led to the party being expelled from the Socialist International in 2012 for continuing to "espouse a nationalist and extremist" line.

== List of presidents ==
#	Name (Born–Died)	Portrait	Term of Office	
1	Milorad Dodik (b. 1959)		10 March 1996	present

== Election results ==
=== Parliamentary Assembly of Bosnia and Herzegovina ===
Parliamentary Assembly of Bosnia and Herzegovina
Year	Leader	#	Popular vote	%	HoR	Seat change	HoP	Seat change	Government
1996 (Note: Run as part of the People's Alliance for Free Peace.)	Milorad Dodik	5th	136,077	5.67	1 / 42	New	0 / 15	New	Opposition
1998 (Note: Run in coalition with SNS and SP.)	Milorad Dodik	▲2nd	214,716	12.44	1 / 42	Steady	1 / 15	▲1	Coalition
2000	Milorad Dodik	▼7th	75,821	5.09	1 / 42	Steady	1 / 15	Steady	Opposition
2002	Milorad Dodik	▲5th	120,376	9.80	3 / 42	▲2	0 / 15	▼1	Opposition
2006	Milorad Dodik	▲1st	269,468	19.08	7 / 42	▲4	3 / 15	▲3	Coalition
2010	Milorad Dodik	▼2nd	277,819	16.92	8 / 42	▲1	2 / 15	▼1	Coalition
2014	Milorad Dodik	2nd	255,024	15.64	6 / 42	▼2	2 / 15	Steady	Opposition
2018	Milorad Dodik	2nd	265,593	16.03	6 / 42	Steady	4 / 15	▲2	Coalition
2022	Milorad Dodik	2nd	259,521	16.34	6 / 42	Steady	3 / 15	▼1	Coalition
2026	Milorad Dodik	2nd	229,513	16.96	6 / 42	Steady	3 / 15	Steady	Coalition

=== National Assembly of Republika Srpska ===
National Assembly of Republika Srpska
Year	Leader	#	Popular vote	%	# of seats	Seat change	Coalition	Government
1996	Milorad Dodik	3rd	125,372	11.53%	1 / 83	New	NSSM	Opposition
1998	Milorad Dodik	▼6th	53,802	7.29%	6 / 83	▲5	—	Coalition
2000	Milorad Dodik	▲2nd	81,467	13.00%	11 / 83	▲5	—	Opposition
2002	Milorad Dodik	2nd	111,226	21.79%	19 / 83	▲8	—	Opposition
2006	Milorad Dodik	▲1st	244,251	43.31%	41 / 83	▲22	—	Coalition
2010	Milorad Dodik	1st	240,727	38.00%	37 / 83	▼4	—	Coalition
2014	Milorad Dodik	1st	213,665	32.28%	29 / 83	▼8	—	Coalition
2018	Milorad Dodik	1st	218,201	31.87%	28 / 83	▼1	—	Coalition
2022	Milorad Dodik	1st	221,554	34.63%	29 / 83	▲1	—	Coalition
2026	Milorad Dodik	1st	214,609	38.88%	34 / 83	▲5	—	Coalition

=== Presidential elections ===
Presidency of Bosnia and Herzegovina
Election year	#	Candidate	Votes	%	Note	Elected?
1998	1st	Živko Radišić	359,937	51.3%	Support	Yes
2002	▼2nd	Nebojša Radmanović	101,119	19.9%	—	No
2006	▲1st	Nebojša Radmanović	287,675	53.3%	—	Yes
2010	1st	Nebojša Radmanović	295,629	48.9%	—	Yes
2014	▼2nd	Željka Cvijanović	310,658	47.5%	—	No
2018	▲1st	Milorad Dodik	368,210	53.9%	—	Yes
2022	1st	Željka Cvijanović	327,720	51.6%	—	Yes
2026	1st	Željka Cvijanović	319,705	55.6%	—	Yes

President of Republika Srpska
Election year	#	Candidate	Votes	%	Elected?
2000	2nd	Milorad Dodik	161,942	25.7%	No
2002	2nd	Milan Jelić	112,612	22.1%	No
2006	▲1st	Milan Jelić	271,022	48.87%	Yes
2007	1st	Rajko Kuzmanović	169,863	41.33%	Yes
2010	1st	Milorad Dodik	319,618	50.52%	Yes
2014	1st	Milorad Dodik	303,496	45.39%	Yes
2018	1st	Željka Cvijanović	319,699	47.04%	Yes
2022	1st	Milorad Dodik	300,180	47.06%	Yes
2025–26	1st	Siniša Karan	224,384	50.54%	Yes
2026	1st	Savo Minić	301,532	52.10%	Yes

== Positions held ==
Major positions held by Alliance of Independent Social Democrats members:

Member of the Presidency of Bosnia and Herzegovina	Years
Nebojša Radmanović	2006–2014
Milorad Dodik	2018–2022
Željka Cvijanović	2022–
Chairman of the Council of Ministers of Bosnia and Herzegovina	Years
Nikola Špirić	2007–2012
Zoran Tegeltija	2019–2023
President of Republika Srpska	Years
Milan Jelić	2006–2007
Rajko Kuzmanović	2007–2010
Milorad Dodik	2010–2018; 2022–2025
Željka Cvijanović	2018–2022
Siniša Karan	2026–2026
Savo Minić	2026–
Prime Minister of Republika Srpska	Years
Milorad Dodik	1998–2001; 2006–2010
Aleksandar Džombić	2010–2013
Željka Cvijanović	2013–2018
Radovan Višković	2018–2025
Savo Minić	2025–2026
Speaker of the National Assembly of Republika Srpska	Years
Igor Radojičić	2006–2014

== Bibliography ==
- Šedo, Jakub (2013). "The party system of Bosnia and Herzegovina". In Stojarová, Věra; Emerson, Peter (eds.). Party Politics in the Western Balkans. London-New York: Routledge. ISBN 9781135235857.
