= Government of Republika Srpska =

- Влада Републике Српске; Vlada Republike Srpske

Overview
- Established: 22 April 1992
- State: Republika Srpska
- Leader: Prime Minister
- Appointed by: National Assembly
- Ministries: 16
- Responsible to: National Assembly
- Headquarters: Banja Luka, Republika Srpska, Bosnia and Herzegovina
- Website: www.vladars.net

Government of Republika Srpska (Serbo-Croatian: Влада Републике Српске / Vlada Republika Srpske) is the executive authority of Republika Srpska, along with the President of Republika Srpska. The Prime Minister is head of the Government, while the Government is composed of his deputies and ministers. The powers of the Government are determined by the Constitution of Republika Srpska. The Government is appointed by the National Assembly for a four-year term.

The first Government of Republika Srpska was inaugurated on 22 April 1992, and the first Prime Minister of Republika Srpska was Branko Đerić. The current Government led by Prime Minister Radovan Višković was elected after the 2022 general election and was inaugurated by the National Assembly on 21 December 2022. Through its history, Republika Srpska has had nineteen governments.

== Powers ==
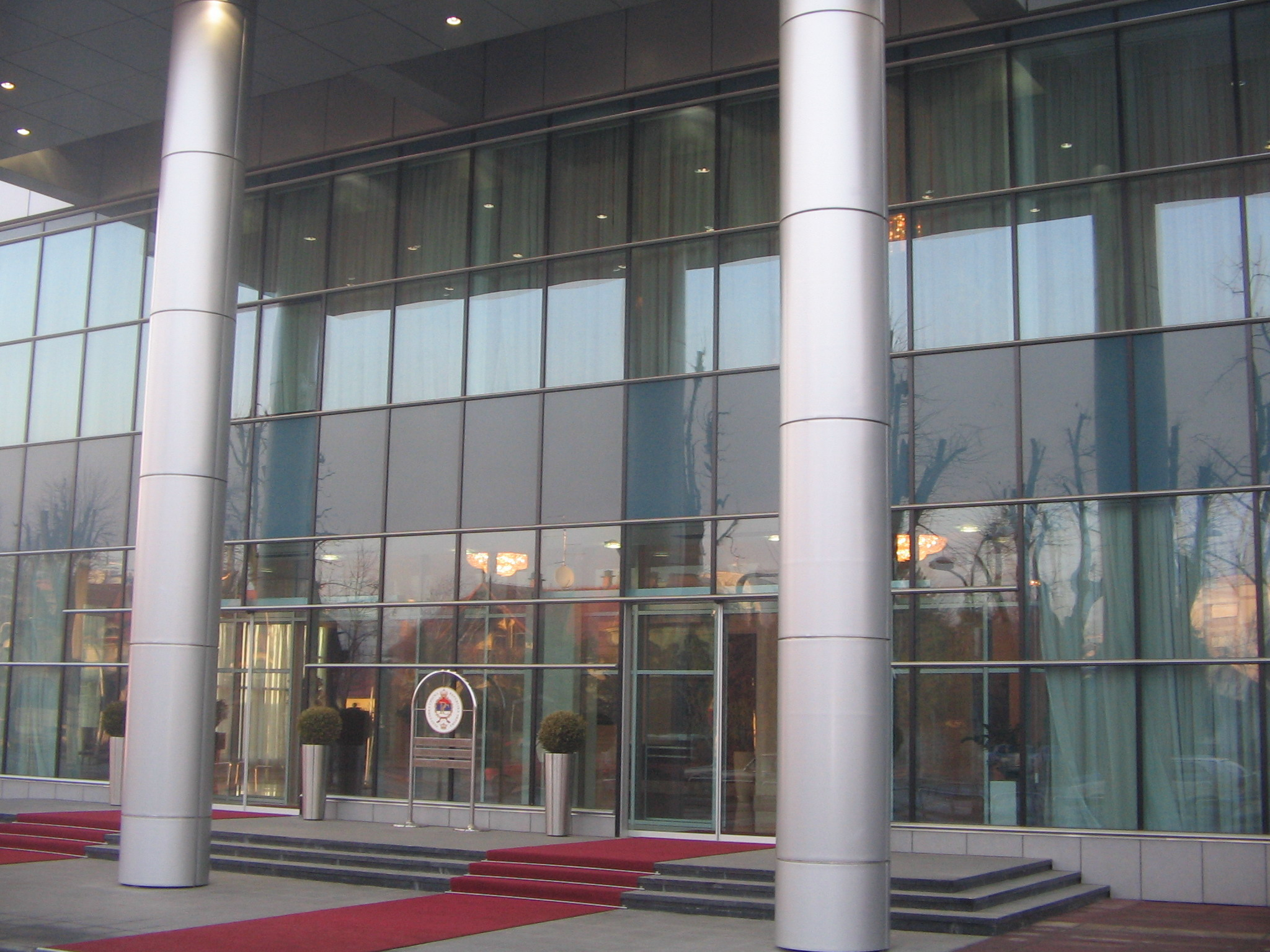
Entry to the building of the Government of Republika Srpska

According to the Constitution of Republika Srpska, the Government has the power to:

- Suggest laws, other regulations and general acts;
- Suggest development plan, spatial plan, the budget and the balance sheet;
- Secures the implementation and the execution of laws, other regulations and general acts;
- Enacts decrees, decisions and other acts for the law implementation;
- Gives opinion on suggestions of laws, other regulations and general acts that are brought before the National Assembly by another proposer;
- Determines principles for internal organisation of ministries and other republican organs of administration and administrative organisations, appoints and dismisses officials in the ministries, other republican organs and administrative organisations;
- Determines and directs the activity of ministries and other republican organs and administrative organisations;
- Supervises the activity of ministries and other republican organs and administrative organisations, abolishes or cancels their acts that are contrary to laws or government regulation;
- Does other activities in accordance with the Constitution and law.

The Government also has power to appoint foreign representatives of Republika Srpska.

== Election and composition ==
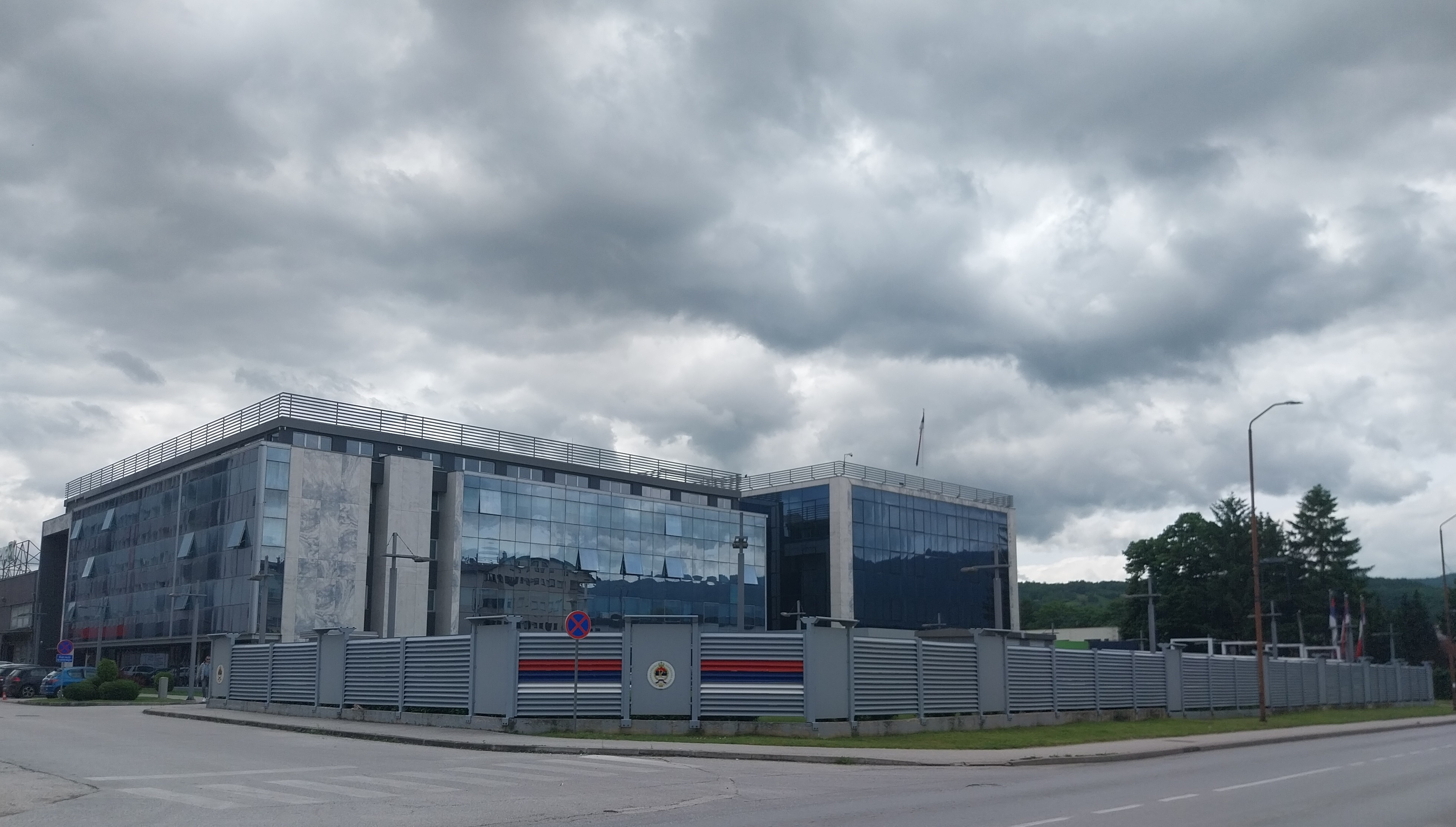
Administrative Center of the Government of Republika Srpska in Istočno Sarajevo

The Government is appointed by the National Assembly for a four-year term. The new government is appointed every time after constituting the new assembly.

Prime Minister of Republika Srpska is head of the Government, with official title being President of the Government. The Government is, along with the Prime Minister, composed of his deputies and ministers. A member of parliament elected as Prime Minister of a minister in the government cannot decide on election of the Government, and the member of parliament appointed to these duties cannot vote on distrust to the Government, his removal or reports of the Government or his ministry.

The Prime Minister and his or her deputies cannot be members of the same constituent nation (Serbian, Bosniak and Croatian). The Prime Minister has two deputies, who are also ministers in the Government. At least 15% of the Government must be composed out of members of one of the constituent nations, and at least 35% of the Government must be composed of members of the two constituent nations.

== Relation with other government braches ==
The Government and its members are responsible to the National Assembly, which can vote on the distrust to the Government. The proposal on the voting on the distrust to the Government can be made by at least twenty people's representatives (members of parliament). The Government can also ask about its trust in within the National Assembly.

Prime Minister can suggest removal of the Government members to the National Assembly. The decision on removal of the Government or particular member of the Government can be made only with the support of the majority of the total number of people's representatives. The Government or its member can resign before the National Assembly. The resignation or removal of the Prime Minister entails resignation of the entire Government.

The Government that was voted on distrust, or resigned or which term has ended because of a dismissal of the National Assembly, remains on duty until the election of a new Government.

The President of Republika Srpska suggests the candidate for the Prime Minister within ten days after the resignation had been accepted, or the voting of distrust or the end of the term due to the dismissal of the National Assembly or shortening terms of the people's representatives. The new Government must be elected within forty days after the candidate for the Prime Minister had been suggested.

During the term, the Prime Minister can, based on the opinion of the President of the Republic or Speaker of the National Assembly, change the Government composition, after which he must inform the National Assembly.

If the President of the Republic determines that there's a crisis in the functioning of the Government, he can, on the initiative of at least twenty people's representatives, and after he hears the opinion of the Speaker of the National Assembly and the Prime Minister, ask the Prime Minister to resign. If the Prime Minister refuses to resign, he can be removed from office by the President of the Republic.

The National Assembly can, during the war or intermediate war danger, vote on the distrust to the Government by the majority vote on a session with majority of people's representatives present.

== Organisation and activity ==
State administration affairs are led by ministries and other republican organs of administration. Ministries and other republican organs of administration implement laws, other regulations and general acts of the National Assembly and the Government, as well as those of the President of the Republic; they decide in administrative matters, carry out the administrative supervision, and do other administrative affairs determined by law.

Ministries and other republican organs of administration are independent in their execution of powers determined by the Constitution and law. Certain administrative powers can be given to companies and other organisations.

The constituent nations and minorities will be proportionately represented in public institutions in Republika Srpska. The proportional representation is made in accordance with the 1991 census. The said public institutions are ministries of Republika Srpska, municipal governments, regional and municipal courts in Republika Srpska.
