= President of Republika Srpska =

Political position in Bosnia and Herzegovina

- Предсједник Републике Српске; Predsjednik Republike Srpske
- Seal of Republika Srpska

- Standard of the President of Republika Srpska

- Incumbent; Savo Minić since 16 November 2026
- Type: Head of state
- Residence: Palace of the Republic
- Seat: Banja Luka
- Appointer: Direct popular vote
- Term length: Four years, renewable once consecutively
- Inaugural holder: Radovan Karadžić
- Formation: 7 April 1992; 34 years ago
- Deputy: Vice Presidents
- Website: www.predsjednikrs.rs/rs/

The president of Republika Srpska (Serbian Cyrillic: Предсједник Републике Српске, Serbian Latin: Predsjednik Republike Srpske) is the highest executive authority in Republika Srpska, an entity in Bosnia and Herzegovina. It is one of the executive authorities, along with the Government of Republika Srpska. The president of Republika Srpska is directly elected for a term of four years, along with two vice presidents from different constituent nations (Serbs, Bosniaks and Croats). None of them can be from a same constituent nation at the same time. The president's residence is in Banja Luka.

The first president was Radovan Karadžić of the Serb Democratic Party, elected to the post in 1992, who led Republika Srpska during the Bosnian War and who was later sentenced to 40 years in prison for Srebrenica genocide, war crimes and crimes against humanity. Savo Minić of the Alliance of Independent Social Democrats took office in 2026.

== Powers ==
According to the Constitution of Republika Srpska, the president represents Republika Srpska and expresses its unity. As Republika Srpska functions as a parliamentary system, the president has very limited powers. The president does have the power to:

1. Nominate a candidate for prime minister to the National Assembly;
2. Nominate candidates for president and judges of the Constitutional Court, on a proposal of the High Judicial and Prosecutorial Council, to the National Assembly;
3. Declares laws by a decree;
4. Gives pardons;
5. Gives decorations and recognitions as determined by a law;
6. Manages other duties according to the Constitution.

If the National Assembly is unable to make a session due to a state of emergency, the president, after obtaining an opinion from the Government, declares a state of emergency and orders measures for removing the state of emergency. The president, by his own initiative or on Government's suggestion, declares acts from the jurisdiction of the National Assembly during war circumstances or an immediate threat of war; the acts must be brought for a confirmation by the National Assembly the very moment when the Assembly is able to have a session.

The president can ask the Government to express its attitude on certain matters of the significance for the Republic, call a session of the Government, or put matters from Government's jurisdiction on an agenda.

== Latest election ==
Karan of the SNSD narrowly won the election, securing some 50.5% of the vote. He secured victory in 45 cities and municipalities, out of 64 including three municipalities out of six in Istočno Sarajevo. Conversely, Blanuša won 19 polities, including Banja Luka, Republika Srpska's de facto capital and largest city. Additionally, Blanuša won in Bijeljina, the entity's second-largest city, and initially secured a narrow victory in Prijedor, the third-largest one; however, it eventually voted for Karan in the repeat election.

Candidate	Party	Votes	%
Siniša Karan	Alliance of Independent Social Democrats	224,382	50.53
Branko Blanuša	Serb Democratic Party	213,512	48.09
Dragan Đokanović	Alliance for New Politics	2,028	0.46
Nikola Lazarević	Ecological Party of Republika Srpska	1,660	0.37
Igor Gašević	Independent	1,364	0.31
Slavko Dragičević	Independent	1,068	0.24
Total		444,014	100.00
Valid votes		444,014	98.19
Invalid votes		7,323	1.62
Blank votes		882	0.20
Total votes		452,219	100.00
Registered voters/turnout		1,264,366	35.77
Source: CEC

== See also ==
- List of presidents of Republika Srpska
- Presidency of Bosnia and Herzegovina
- President of the Federation of Bosnia and Herzegovina
