= Valentin Inzko =

Austrian diplomat (born 1949)

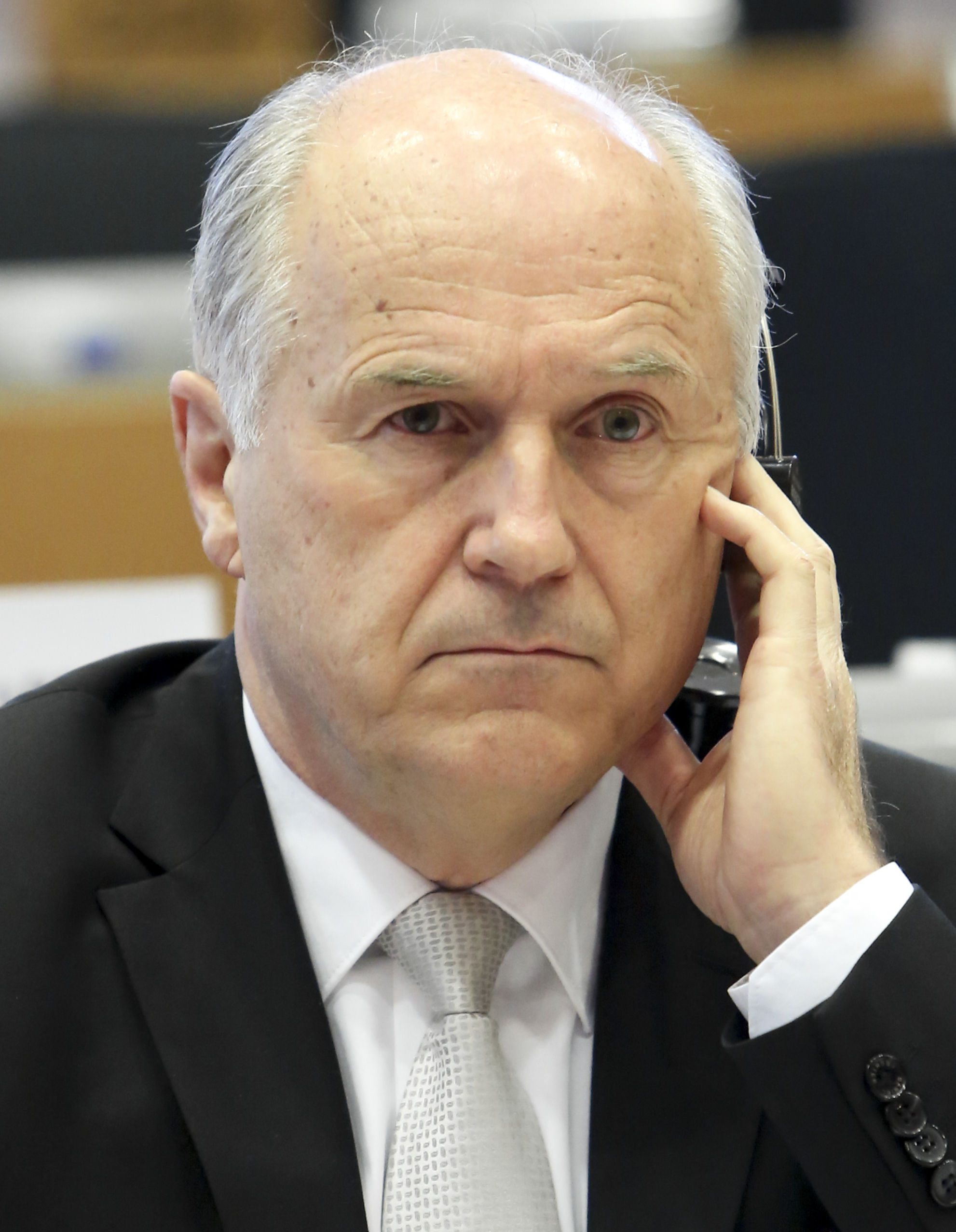
- Inzko in 2017

High Representative for Bosnia and Herzegovina
- In office 26 March 2009 – 1 August 2021
- Preceded by: Miroslav Lajčák
- Succeeded by: Christian Schmidt

European Union Special Representative for Bosnia and Herzegovina
- In office 1 March 2009 – 31 August 2011
- Preceded by: Miroslav Lajčák
- Succeeded by: Peter Sørensen

Personal details
- Born: 22 May 1949 (age 77) Klagenfurt, Allied-occupied Austria
- Spouse: Bernarda Fink
- Education: University of Graz; Diplomatic Academy of Vienna

Valentin Inzko (born 22 May 1949) is an Austrian diplomat who served as the High Representative for Bosnia and Herzegovina from 2009 to 2021. He also served as the European Union Special Representative for Bosnia and Herzegovina from 2009 to 2021.

== Background ==
Inzko was born into a Carinthian Slovene family in Klagenfurt, Carinthia. His father, Valentin Inzko Sr., was a renowned cultural and political activist of the local Slovene minority. Valentin Jr. attended a Slovene-German bilingual school in Suetschach (Slovene: Sveče) in the municipality of Feistritz im Rosental (Slovene: Bistrica v Rožu). After finishing the Slovene language high school in Klagenfurt in 1967, he enrolled in the University of Graz, where he studied law and Slavic philology. Between 1972 and 1974, he attended the Diplomatic Academy of Vienna.

Besides Slovene and German, Inzko is fluent in English, Serbo-Croatian, Russian and Czech. Among other works, he has translated the essays of Václav Havel's Living in Truth and The Power of the Powerless into Slovene.

Inzko is married to Argentine Slovene opera singer Bernarda Fink Inzko.

== Early career ==
In 1974, Inzko entered the Austrian diplomatic service. Between 1982 and 1986, he worked as press attache at the Austrian embassy in Belgrade. After that, he worked at the Austrian mission to the United Nations. Between 1990 and 1996, he worked as the cultural attache at the Austrian embassy in the Czech Republic, and between 1996 and 1999, he was the Austrian ambassador to Bosnia and Herzegovina.

Between October and December 1992, Inzko was a member of the Organization for Security and Co-operation in Europe mission to the Sandžak region in Serbia. In 2005, he was named as the Austrian ambassador to Slovenia. In June 2010, Inzko was elected to be chairman of the National Council of Carinthian Slovenes.

== High Representative for Bosnia and Herzegovina (2009–2021) ==
In March 2009, Inzko became the seventh high representative for Bosnia and Herzegovina, replacing the Slovak diplomat Miroslav Lajčák. Inzko thus became the second Carinthian Slovene to occupy that position, after Wolfgang Petritsch who served as the high representative between 1999 and 2002.

On 9 June 2009, Inzko used his powers for the first time and sacked two police officials. The two officials were Bosniak Himzo Đonko, a police commissioner in the Herzegovina-Neretva Canton, blamed for threatening Bosnian international officials in a bid to obstruct an investigation in his abuse of power accusations, and Bosnian Serb Radislav Jovičić, an official in the State Investigation and Protection Agency, alleged to have used his subordinates to illegally follow and observe Inzko's staff.

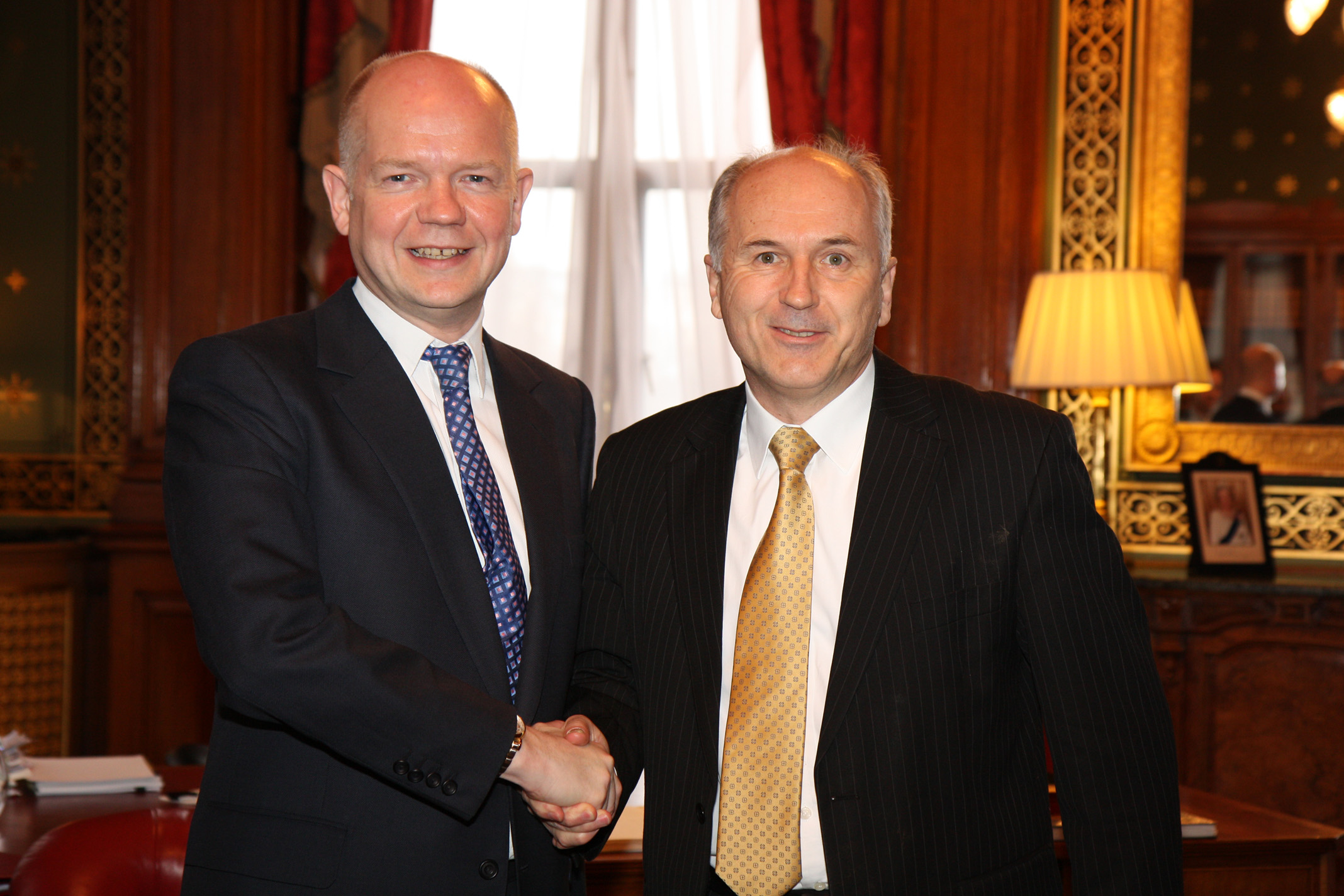
Inzko with British Foreign Secretary William Hague, 17 February 2011

In December 2020, Inzko, with the help of Sonja Karadžić-Jovičević, succeeded in having a plaque honoring convicted war criminal and Srebrenica genocide perpetrator Radovan Karadžić, Sonja's father, removed after threatening Bosnian Serb leader and Presidency member Milorad Dodik with European Union sanctions if the plaque was not removed within six months.

In May 2021, Inzko demanded the withdrawal of Republika Srpska honors for convicted war criminals, stating in his letter that "the glorification of war criminals directly hurts and provokes those who suffered the consequences of the war and damages the memory of the victims". This was the first time that he used the Bonn powers in eleven years. The National Assembly of Republika Srpska refused to withdraw the honors and claimed that Inzko's demand violates human rights.

On 27 May 2021, he resigned from his office of the high representative for Bosnia and Herzegovina, with German politician Christian Schmidt set to become the new high representative on 1 August 2021.

In the last ten days of his term as high representative, on 23 July 2021, Inzko unexpectedly imposed amendments to the Criminal Code of Bosnia and Herzegovina which banned the genocide denial and relativization of war crimes in Bosnia and Herzegovina. He stated that the growing denial of genocide "represents a direct barrier to peace, reconciliation and trust-building and ultimately undermines the prospects for a secure, peaceful future." This was met with heavy criticism by Bosnian Serb politicians, especially by Milorad Dodik, stating "We [Republika Srpska] are forced to go into dissolution" and repeating many times that the "genocide did not happen." While the Bosnian Serb politicians were criticizing Inzko, Bosniak politicians were praising him for the imposed changes, with Bosniak leader Bakir Izetbegović congratulating Inzko for his decision. The chairman of the Presidency of Bosnia and Herzegovina and its Croat member Željko Komšić also praised Inzko for his "brave decision to impose these much necessary changes." Internationally, Inzko got support from Croatian Foreign and European Affairs Minister Gordan Grlić-Radman, as well as from the United States Embassy in Sarajevo.

On 1 August 2021, Christian Schmidt officially became the new high representative, succeeding Inzko.

== Honours ==
- Austria: Grand Decoration of Honour in Silver for Services to the Republic of Austria (2012)

Diplomatic posts
Preceded by Miroslav Lajčák	High Representative for Bosnia and Herzegovina; 2009–2021	Succeeded by Christian Schmidt
Preceded by Miroslav Lajčák	European Union Special Representative for Bosnia and Herzegovina; 2009–2011	Succeeded by Peter Sørensen
