= Medal for Soldier's Virtue =

Republika Srpska medal

Medal for Soldier's Virtue Медаља за војничке врлине
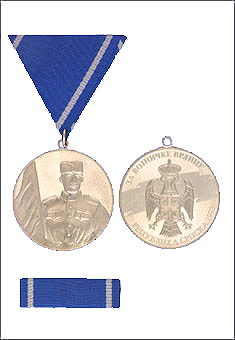
- Medal for Soldier's Virtue (top: medal; bottom: ribbon bar)
- Type: Military
- Presented by: Republika Srpska
- Eligibility: Members of the Army of Republika Srpska
- Status: Active
- Established: 28 April 1993
- Ribbon bar of the Medal for Soldier's Virtue

Precedence
- Next (higher): Medal for Military Merit
- Next (lower): None

Medal for Soldier's Virtue (Serbian: Медаља за војничке врлине) is a Medal of Republika Srpska. It was established in 1993 by the Constitution of Republika Srpska and 'Law on orders and awards' valid since 28 April 1993.

The Medal for Military Merit has one class and is awarded is awarded to members of the Army of Republika Srpska for exemplary conduct, knowledge and performance of military duties.

The inscription on the medal reads: For military virtues, Republika Srpska.

== See also ==
- Orders, decorations and medals of Republika Srpska
