= Dragan Lukač =

Bosnian Serb politician (born 1968)

- Драган Лукач

Minister of Interior of Republika Srpska
- In office 18 December 2014 – 21 December 2022
- Preceded by: Radislav Jovičić
- Succeeded by: Siniša Karan

Personal details
- Born: 1968 (age 57–58) Bosanski Petrovac, SR Bosnia and Herzegovina, SFR Yugoslavia
- Party: Alliance of Independent Social Democrats
- Spouse: Marijana Lukač
- Children: 4

Dragan Lukač (Serbian Cyrillic: Драган Лукач; born 1968) is a Bosnian Serb politician who served as Minister of Interior of Republika Srpska for the Alliance of Independent Social Democrats from 2014 to 2022. He is a former colonel of Police of Republika Srpska and commander of Special Brigade of Police and Sixth Detachment of Special Brigade of Police during the Bosnian War.

== Biography ==
Dragan Lukač was born in 1968 in Krnjeuša, Bosanski Petrovac, where he graduated elementary school. Later he graduated from technical high school in Bihać and after that, he continued his education in Banja Luka on High school of Internal Affairs and later on College of Internal Affairs. After graduating from college, he became the magister of state-law sciences.

During his working period, he worked in Secretariat of Internal Affairs of Socialist Republic of Bosnia and Herzegovina in Center of Security Service in Sarajevo and Bihać. During wartime period he was commander of Sixth Detachment of Special Brigade of Police as colonel. Dragan Lukač is decorated with the Order of Miloš Obilić and the Order of Karađorđe Star for his successful command of units during war.

After the war, he was commander of the Special Brigade and he worked in the Ministry of Interior till 2005. After that, he worked in Banja Luka City Administration as the chief of Department of Municipal Police.

He was member of the second Government cabinet of Željka Cvijanović when he first time became Minister of Interior (after the 2014 Republika Srpska general election) and he is a member of the entity Government of Radovan Višković (after the 2018 Republika Srpska general election).

In December 2018, thousands of protesters called for Lukač's resignation and against his re-appointment as RS interior minister, deeming him responsible of the cover-up of the Death of David Dragičević. The protest was dispersed and several persons were detained. Lukač also sued Dragicevic's father, Davor, for allegedly "jeopardizing the security of the Interior Minister". The investigation was discontinued three years later, in September 2021.

== Decorations ==
=== National decorations ===
- Order of Miloš Obilić
- Order of Karađorđe Star

== See also ==
- Government of Republika Srpska
- Ministry of Interior (Republika Srpska)
- Police of Republika Srpska
- Special Anti-Terrorist Unit (Republika Srpska)
