= Medal of Merit to the People =

Medal of Merit to the People may refer to:

- Medal of Merit to the People (Republika Srpska) (Serbian: Медаља заслуге за народ, romanized: Medalja zasluge za narod), a Republika Srpska medal
- Medal of Merit to the People (Yugoslavia) (Serbo-Croatian: Медаља заслуге за народ / Medalja zasluge za narod), a Yugoslav medal
