= Chen Bo =

Chen Bo may refer to:

- Chen Bo (diplomat) (born 1970), Chinese diplomat
- Chen Bo (footballer) (born 1989), Chinese footballer

== See also ==
- Chen Tuan (died 989), semi-legendary Taoist figure, sometimes mispronounced as Chen Bo
