= Medal of Petar Mrkonjić =

Republika Srpska medal

Medal of Petar Mrkonjić Медаља Петра Мркоњића
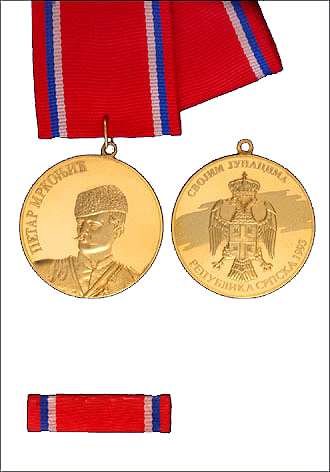
- Medal of Petar Mrkonjić (top: medal; bottom: ribbon bar)
- Type: Medal
- Awarded for: "excellence in the service of Army of Republika Srpska"
- Presented by: Republika Srpska
- Eligibility: Members of the Army of Republika Srpska
- Status: Active
- Established: 28 April 1993
- Final award: 2022
- Ribbon bar of the Medal of Petar Mrkonjić

Precedence
- Next (higher): None
- Next (lower): Medal of Major Milan Tepić

The Medal of Petar Mrkonjić (Serbian: Медаља Петра Мркоњића) is a Medal of Republika Srpska. It was established in 1993 by the Constitution of Republika Srpska and 'Law on orders and awards' valid since 28 April 1993.

The Medal is awarded to members of the Army of Republika Srpska who achieved significant feats in battle. Following the VRS' merger into the OSBiH, it has been retroactively conferred to VRS units.

It is named after Petar Mrkonjić nom de guerre of King Peter I of Serbia, that he used in Great Eastern Crisis before he become king.

== See also ==
- Petar Mrkonjić
- Orders, decorations and medals of Republika Srpska
