= FK Omladinac Banja Luka =

Omladinac Banja Luka
- Full name: FK Omladinac Banja Luka
Home colours	Away colours

FK Omladinac (Serbian Cyrillic: ФК Oмлaдинaц Бaњa Лукa) is a football club from the neighborhood Lazarevo in the city of Banja Luka, in Republika Srpska, Bosnia and Herzegovina. The club used to compete in the First League of the Republika Srpska.

== Notable former coaches ==
- Branimir Tulić
- Marko Milošević

== External sources ==
- "Bosnia and Herzegovina - Omladinac Banja Luka". Soccerway. Archived from the original on December 29, 2021.
- Club at RS-Sport.org.
