= Darko Ćulum =

Bosnian police officer

- Дарко Ћулум

Director of the State Investigation and Protection Agency
- Incumbent
- Assumed office 14 July 2020
- Preceded by: Perica Stanić

Director of the Police of Republika Srpska
- In office 1 September 2016 – 14 July 2020

Personal details
- Born: 11 January 1969 (age 57) Banja Luka, SR BiH, Yugoslavia
- Education: University of Banja Luka

Darko Ćulum (Serbian Cyrillic: Дарко Ћулум; born 11 January 1969) is a Bosnian police officer and former director of Bosnia and Herzegovina's State Investigation and Protection Agency from 2020 to 2025.

== Biography ==
Ćulum was born in Ljubačevo, 8 km south of Banja Luka. He graduated from the secondary police school in Sarajevo in 1988, when he became a police officer. On 1998 he finished his education at the Faculty of Philosophy in Banja Luka and in 2009 he graduated from Faculty of Security, also in Banja Luka.

From April 1999 Ćulum served as chief of the police group for the prevention of serious thefts. In October 2003 he became chief of the department for the fight against serious crimes. Between 2006 and 2010 he was chief of the sector of crime police of the center for public security of Banja Luka, and between 2010 and 2012 he was chief of the center of public security. In February 2012 he became chief of administration of the RS Police and in February 2015 he was appointed deputy director of the RS police, replacing Nijaz Smajlović.

On 18 August 2016 the Government of Republika Srpska appointed Ćulum as RS police director, replacing Gojko Vasić. During his term, together with the RS Minister of the Interior Dragan Lukač, Ćulum has been accused of taking part in the cover-up of police officers involved in the death of David Dragičević. Together with Lukač and Darko Ilić, in 2018 he sued Davor Dragičević, David's father, for libel.

On 14 July 2020, Ćulum was appointed as Director of Bosnia and Herzegovina's State Investigation and Protection Agency.

== See also ==
- Police of Republika Srpska
