= Order of the Flag of Republika Srpska =

Republika Srpska order

Order of the Flag of Republika Srpska Орден заставе Републике Српске
- Type: Civil decoration
- Presented by: Republika Srpska
- Status: Active
- Established: 28 April 1993
- with gold wreath with silver wreath Ribbon bars of the Order of the Flag of Republika Srpska

Precedence
- Next (higher): Order of Nemanjići
- Next (lower): Order of Karađorđe Star

The Order of the Flag of Republika Srpska (Serbian: Орден заставе Републике Српске) is an Order of the Republic of Srpska. It was established in 1993 by the Constitution of Republika Srpska and 'Law on orders and awards' valid since 28 April 1993.

== Ranks ==
The Order of the Flag of the Republika Srpska was established in two ranks. The first rank is the Order of the Flag with a gold wreath, and the second rank is the Order of the Flag with a silver wreath.

The Order of the Flag with a gold and silver wreath is awarded for work and extraordinary merits in the post-war development of Republika Srpska, strengthening peace and international cooperation, for results and achievements of wider significance and scale in the affirmation of Republika Srpska. The motto of the Order is: He who shines on people must himself be light.

With gold wreath	With silver wreath

== Notable recipients ==
=== With gold wreath ===
- 2020 - (Serbia) Aleksandar Vulin
- 2019 - Chen Bo, Ambassador of the People's Republic of China to Bosnia and Herzegovina
- 2019 - (Russia) Pyotr Ivantsov
- 2018 - (Serbia) Emir Kusturica
- 2017 - (Russia) Vitaly Churkin

=== With silver wreath ===
- 2020 - (Serbia) Vladimir Nikolić
- 2018 - (Russia) Pavel Dorokhin
- 2016 - (Uruguay) José Mujica

== See also ==
- Flag of Republika Srpska
- Orders, decorations and medals of Republika Srpska
