= Medal of Major Milan Tepić =

Republika Srpska medal

Medal of Major Milan Tepić Медаља мајора Милана Тепића
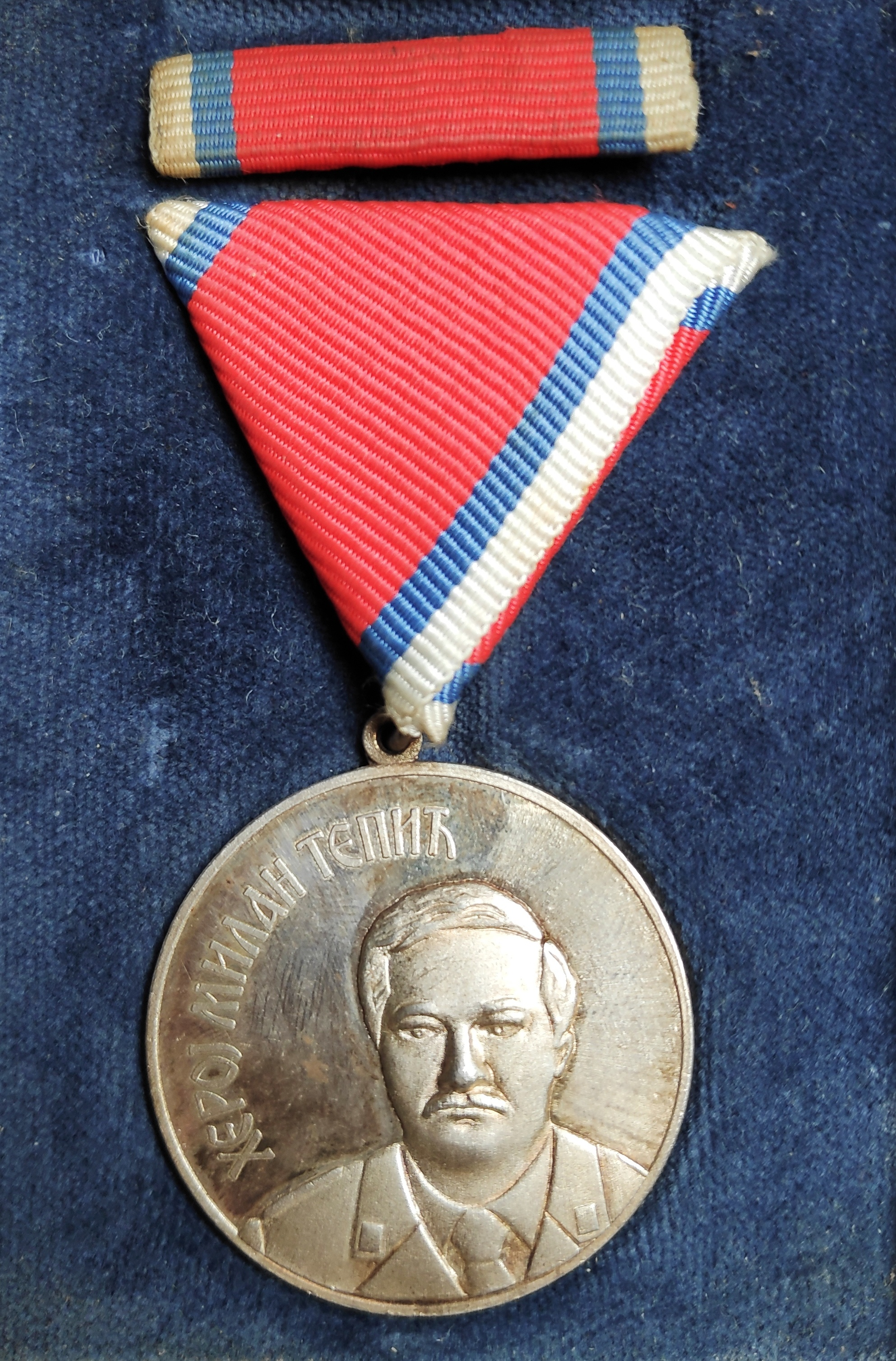
- Medal of Major Milan Tepić (top: ribbon bar; bottom: medal)
- Type: Medal
- Awarded for: "bravery in battle"
- Presented by: Republika Srpska
- Eligibility: Members of the Army of Republika Srpska
- Status: Active
- Established: 28 April 1993
- Ribbon bar of the Medal of Major Milan Tepić

Precedence
- Next (higher): Medal of Petar Mrkonjić
- Next (lower): Medal of Merit to the People

The Medal of Major Milan Tepić (Serbian: Медаља мајора Милана Тепића) is a Medal of Republika Srpska. It was established in 1993 by the Constitution of Republika Srpska and 'Law on orders and awards' valid since 28 April 1993.

The Medal is awarded to members of the Army of Republika Srpska who showed bravery in battle. The statute has not been updated since the creation of the Armed Forces of Bosnia and Herzegovina.

It is named after Milan Tepić.

== See also ==
- Milan Tepić
- Orders, decorations and medals of Republika Srpska
