= Order of the Charity Cross =

Republika Srpska order

Order of the Charity Cross Орден Крст милосрђа
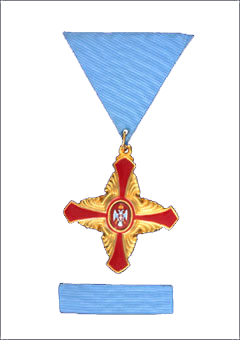
- Order of the Charity Cross (top: Order medal; bottom: Order ribbon)
- Type: State order
- Presented by: Republika Srpska
- Status: Active
- Established: 28 April 1993
- Ribbon bar of the Order of the Charity Cross

Precedence
- Next (higher): Order of Honor
- Next (lower): None

The Order of the Charity Cross (Serbian: Орден Крст милосрђа) is an Order of the Republic of Srpska. It was established in 1993 by the Constitution of Republika Srpska and 'Law on orders and awards' valid since 28 April 1993.

The Order of the Charity Cross has one class and is awarded to collectives and individuals for sacrifice and courage in care of the wounded and sick during combat. In peace it is awarded only for exceptional deeds.

== Notable recipients ==
- 2012 – Ljiljana Rikić
- 2008 – Smilja i Milan Vidović
- 1998 – Prof. dr Mladen Goronja

== See also ==
- Orders, decorations and medals of Republika Srpska
