= Medal for Military Merit (Republika Srpska) =

Republika Srpska medal

Medal for Military Merit Медаља за војне заслуге
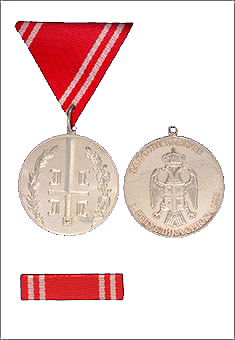
- Medal for Military Merit (top: medal; bottom: ribbon bar)
- Type: Medal
- Presented by: Republika Srpska
- Status: Active
- Established: 28 April 1993
- Ribbon bar of the Medal for Military Merit

Precedence
- Next (higher): Medal for Bravery
- Next (lower): Medal for Soldier's Virtue

Medal for Military Merit (Serbian: Медаља за војне заслуге) is a Medal of Republika Srpska. It was established in 1993 by the Constitution of Republika Srpska and 'Law on orders and awards' valid since 28 April 1993.

The Medal for Military Merit has one class and is awarded is awarded to members of the Army of Republika Srpska for enthusiasm in accomplishing tasks, it can also be awarded to civilians for exemplary work and contribution significant to the state.

The inscription on the medal reads: For Military Merit, Republika Srpska.

== See also ==
- Orders, decorations and medals of Republika Srpska
