= Order of Honor (Republika Srpska) =

Republika Srpska order

Order of Honor Орден части
- Type: State order
- Presented by: Republika Srpska
- Status: Active
- Established: 28 April 1993
- 1st class with golden rays 2nd class with silver rays Ribbon bars of the Order of Honor

Precedence
- Next (higher): Order of Njegoš
- Next (lower): Order of the Charity Cross

Order of Honor of Republika Srpska (Serbian: Орден части) is an Order of the Republic of Srpska. It was established in 1993 by the Constitution of Republika Srpska and 'Law on orders and awards' valid since 28 April 1993.

The Order of Honor has two classes. It is awarded to institutions, organizations and individuals who stand out in the affirmation of human rights, tolerance among peoples and nations, the rule of law and freedoms, as well as those individuals and organizations whose work and results contribute to strengthening the reputation of Republika Srpska.

== Notable recipients ==
=== With golden rays ===
- 2016 - Haim Bibas, the mayor of Modi'in-Maccabim-Re'ut, for friendly relations between Republika Srpska and Israel
- 2013 - (Bosnia and Herzegovina) Srđan Aleksić
- 2012 - (Bosnia and Herzegovina) Franjo Komarica, the Bishop of Banja Luka

=== With silver rays ===
- 2018 - (Serbia) Miroslav Lazanski, Serbian journalist and military analyst

== See also ==
- Orders, decorations and medals of Republika Srpska
