= Bojan Mikulić =

Serbian and Bosnian and Herzegovinian sculptor

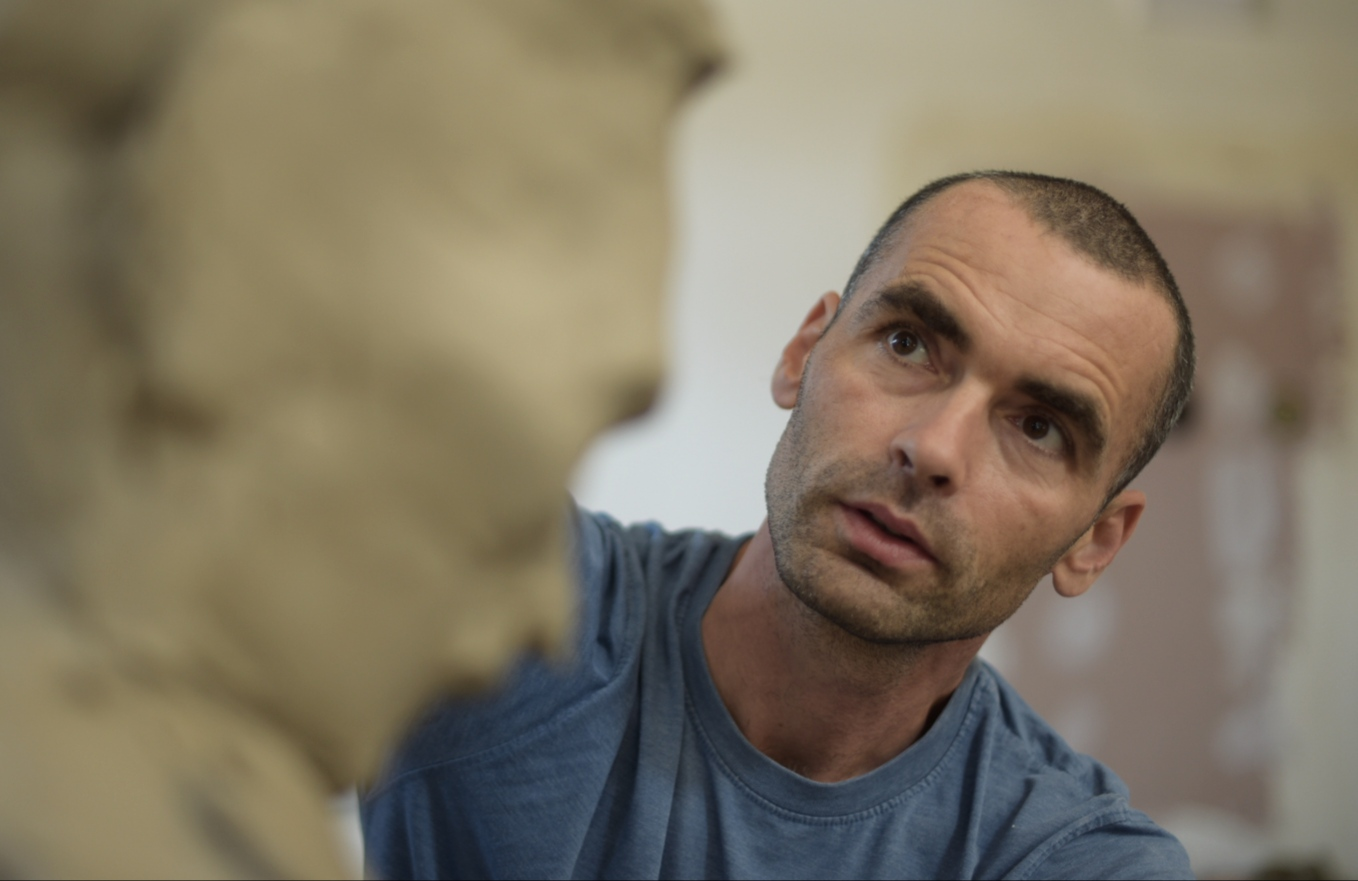
- Born: October 6, 1980 (age 45); Novi Sad, SR Serbia, SFR Yugoslavia
- Known for: Sculpture
- Movement: Realism, Abstract art
- Awards: Medal of Merit to the People of Republika Srpska, Tesla Spirit Award
- Website: bojanmikulic.com

Bojan Mikulić (Serbian Cyrillic: Бојан Микулић; born October 6, 1980) is a Serbian and Bosnian and Herzegovinian academic sculptor from Banja Luka, whose sculptures are exhibited in the United States, Serbia, Turkey and Bosnia and Herzegovina.

== Career ==
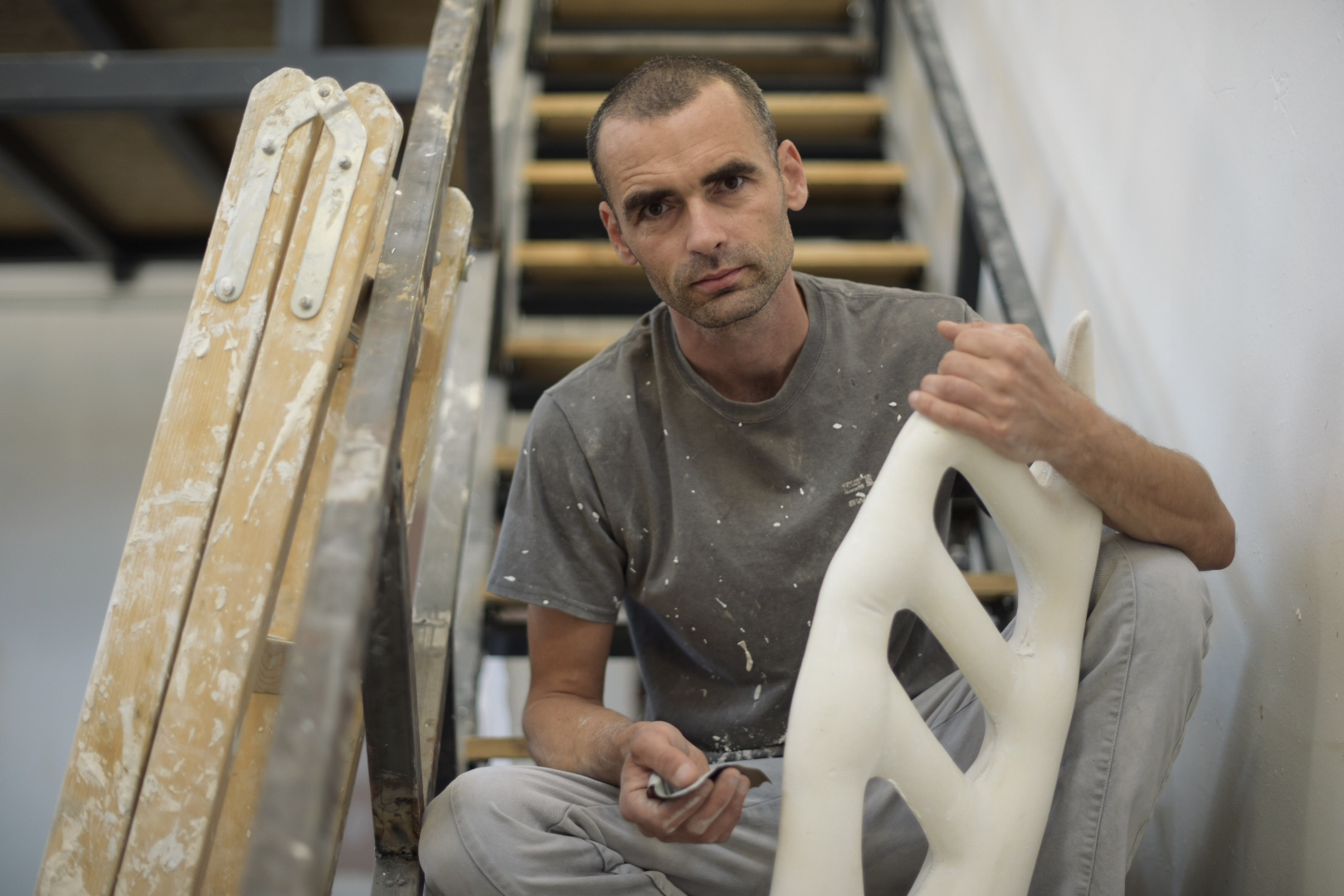
Bojan Mikulić in his studio

Bojan Mikulić was born in Novi Sad, but studied and worked mainly in Bosnia and Herzegovina. He graduated painting at the Academy of Arts in Banja Luka and then received his master's degree in sculpture at the Academy of Fine Arts in Sarajevo. Mikulić's works usually have the features of realism, but as well abstract art. He approaches the shaping of "dead" materials with the desire to create a medium(s) that will "live" communicate with the environment.

=== Works ===
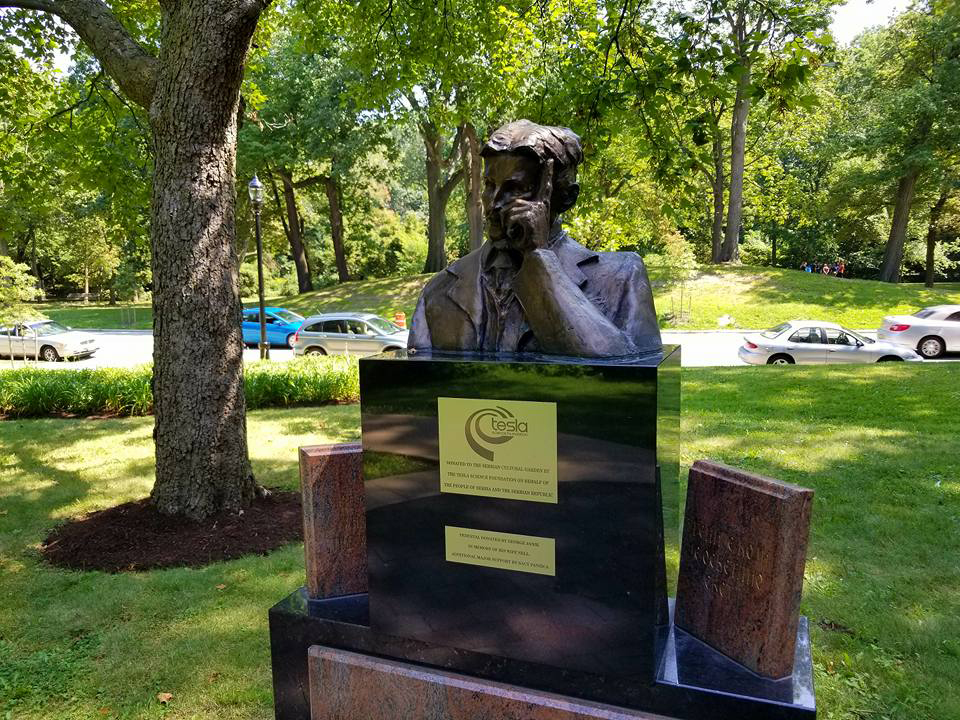
Nikola Tesla bust in Serbian Cultural Garden in Cleveland

By 2015, Mikulić's busts of Nikola Tesla were placed in six different locations in the United States: one in the lobby of New Yorker Hotel in Manhattan, where Tesla lived from 1933 until his death, one in Rahway, New Jersey, where the Tesla Electric Light and Manufacturing Company was located, and one in the Serbian Cultural Garden in Cleveland. A similar bust was unveiled in the Embassy of the United States in Belgrade and in the park of University of Economics in İzmir, Turkey. Therefore, Tesla Science Foundation from Philadelphia conferred him the Tesla Spirit Award.

The Mikulić's work that attracted public attention are the sculptures in water within the Stari Brod Memorial Complex, dedicated in 2019 on Drina river in Stari Brod near Rogatica, which preserves the memory of the victims of the massacre in Stari Brod and Miloševići in 1942. Mikulić made 27 sculptures with 39 faces, for which the President of Republika Srpska awarded him the Medal of Merit to the People of Republika Srpska.

Mikulić further created the statues of Nobel laureates Ivo Andrić and Peter Handke near the House of the Government of Republika Srpska and the sculpture "A Breastfeeding Woman" in Banja Luka's Family Park, then the busts of Nikola Tesla, Mihajlo Pupin, Ivo Andrić and Jovan Dučić in the City Park in Bijeljina and the Patriarch Pavle statue in the gate of the Temple of the Council of the Holy Archangel Gabriel in Pale.

As part of the Friedrich Ebert Foundation's Space Treatment project, i.e. lithopuncture, Bojan Mikulić's stone sculptures were placed on April 22, 2021, the city day, at four locations in Banja Luka, former landfills. The names of the sculptures are: "Klica" in Vrbanja, "Rast" in Lazarevo and "Luka" and "Pecka" in the city vicinity.

The 4.2-meter-high statue of Saint Basil of Ostrog, which Mikulić sculpted, should be discovered in Cetinje or its surroundings. Mikulić also made a statue of Metropolitan Amfilohije Radović, which is 4.2 meters high too and which will probably find its place near the Ostrog Monastery.

The busts of Nebojša Glogovac in Nevesinje and Jelena Trikić (Mother Courage) in front of the Banja Luka maternity hospital are also waiting to be placed.

== See more ==
- List of Serbian artists
