= Medal for Bravery (Republika Srpska) =

Republika Srpska medal

Medal for Bravery Медаља за храброст
- Type: Military
- Presented by: Republika Srpska
- Status: Active
- Established: 28 April 1993
- 1st class (gold) 2nd class (silver) Ribbon bars of the Medal for Bravery

Precedence
- Next (higher): Medal of Merit to the People
- Next (lower): Medal for Military Merit

Medal for Bravery (Serbian: Медаља за храброст) also known as Medal of Gavrilo Princip is a Medal of Republika Srpska. It was established in 1993 by the Constitution of Republika Srpska and 'Law on orders and awards' valid since 28 April 1993.

It is named after Gavrilo Princip.

== Ranks ==
The Medal for Bravery (Medal of Gavrilo Princip) is a Military decoration and has two classes - gold and silver, it is awarded for one or more brave deeds to individuals or smaller units for acts of collective courage.

The inscription on the medal reads: Gavrilo Princip for bravery, Republika Srpska.

1st class (gold)	2nd class (silver)

== See also ==
- Gavrilo Princip
- Orders, decorations and medals of Republika Srpska
