= Sonja Karadžić-Jovičević =

Bosnian Serb politician (born 1967)

Sonja Karadžić-Jovićević

Vice President of the National Assembly of Republika Srpska
- Incumbent
- Assumed office 7 October 2018

Personal details
- Born: Sonja Karadžić; 22 May 1967 (age 58) Sarajevo, SR Bosnia and Herzegovina, SFR Yugoslavia
- Party: Serb Democratic Party
- Occupation: Doctor, politician

Sonja Karadžić-Jovičević (Serbian Cyrillic: Соња Караџић-Јовичевић; born 22 May 1967) is a Bosnian Serb politician and doctor serving as the vice president of the National Assembly of Republika Srpska since 7 October 2018.

She is a member of the Serb Democratic Party, a party founded by her father Radovan Karadžić, the first president of Republika Srpska. In December 2020, High Representative Valentin Inzko, with the help of Sonja Karadžić-Jovičević, succeeded in having a plaque honoring Radovan Karadžić removed after threatening Bosnian Serb leader and Presidency member Milorad Dodik with European Union sanctions if the plaque was not removed within six months.
