= Death of David Dragičević =

2018 death of David Dragičević in Republika Srpska

- David Dragičević
- Date: March 18, 2018
- Location: Banja Luka, Republika Srpska, Bosnia and Herzegovina
- Type: Suspicious Death
- Cause: Under Investigation
- Outcome: Protests, Investigation, Parliamentary Inquire
- Burial: April 7, 2018
- Inquiries: Local Police; National Assembly of Republika Srpska
- Coroner: Željko Karan

On 18 March 2018, David Dragičević, a 21-year-old man, went missing in Banja Luka, Bosnia and Herzegovina. On 24 March, his dead body was found. Police investigation ruled the death as an accident, but Dragičević's parents claimed that their son was brutally murdered and that the police and prosecutor's office were trying to cover-up the case. The result of the police investigation provoked major public uproar and many mass protests were organized demanding the truth and justice. The public was overwhelmingly convinced that Dragičević was murdered.

In May 2018, the National Assembly of Republika Srpska voted to form an Inquiry Board to analyze circumstances surrounding Dragičević's death. The Board found that Dragičević was probably murdered, but its report was rejected by the Assembly. Public protests happened for months but were dispersed until being banned by the police on 25 December 2019.

Despite numerous calls for a new investigation, his death remains classified as an accident. Several people were later indicted for tampering with evidence during the investigation, but no one has been convicted for any crime.

== The incident ==
On 18 March 2018, 21-year-old David Dragičević went out with his friends around 7 PM, but never returned home and was declared missing the same day. On 24 March 2018, his dead body was found at small Crkvena creek in a suburb of Banja Luka. Dragičević was buried on 7 April 2018, at the New Cemetery of Banja Luka. The funeral was attended by the President of Republika Srpska Milorad Dodik.

=== Police investigation ===
Police investigators claimed that on 18 March 2018, Dragičević visited a café in central Banja Luka, where he had been caught up in a fight with several other young men. After this incident, nothing was heard from him until 24 March 2018, when police were informed about a dead body found in the water. According to the police, Dragičević visited another café after the fight, left, and then robbed a house on the way home. Police inspector Darko Ilić claimed that surveillance cameras confirm that Dragičević committed the robbery on the way home and that several stolen items from the robbed house were found in his pockets. According to the police investigation, after the robbery, on his way home, Dragičević walked across a small bridge over Crkvena creek and fell in the water and drowned.

Coroner Željko Karan said that Dragičević had several haematomas on his body, probably caused by strokes during the fight he had, also several post-mortem injuries on the hands, caused by stones at the bottom of the creek. When journalists asked Karan about the possibility that the haematomas were caused by another attack on the bridge, he answered that it is indeed possible, but that it "could not be determined during the autopsy". Despite this, police officially ruled the death as an "accident".

=== Dragičević family and public response ===
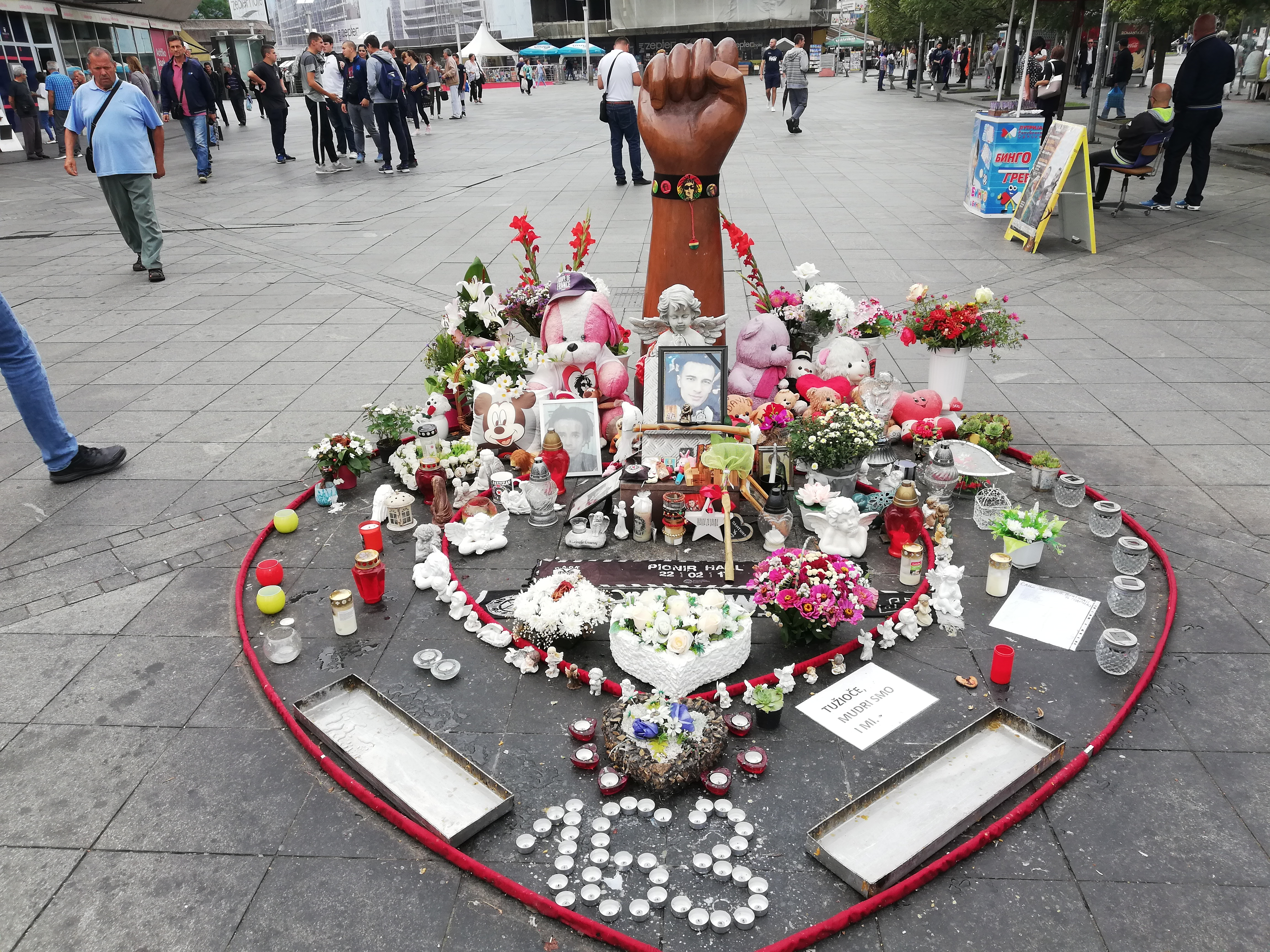
Memorial place for David Dragičević in center of Banja Luka

From the start of the investigation, Dragičević's parents claimed that their son was brutally murdered and that they possessed evidence supporting that claim. According to Davor Dragičević, David's father, "My son was tortured and brutally murdered and police protects the criminals who did it. Minister Lukač, director Ćulum and others are collaborators in this case." He believes that his son's killers are being protected by well-known figure, and police officers, Minister of the Interior Dragan Lukač, and local police chief Darko Ćulum, who are trying to cover-up the crime. Dragičević's mother said that he, on the night he disappeared, sent her an SMS that read "if anything happens to me, the perpetrator will be F. Ć."

Dragičević's death triggered daily protests in Banja Luka from the day his body was found. Every evening at 6 PM, a crowd of 200 had been gathering at the Krajina Square in central Banja Luka demanding justice for Dragičević. On 15 May 2018, a large protest was organized in Sarajevo, the capital of Bosnia and Herzegovina, where several hundred people demanded justice for Dragičević and Dženan Memić, a young man from Sarajevo whose 2016 death was also ruled an accident, but whose father and friends claim was murdered. On 16 May 2018, similar protest organized in Zenica were attended by several hundred people. On 20 May 2018, another protest was held in Tuzla under the banner "Justice for David and Dženan". Another protest was organized in Sarajevo on 26 May 2018. Another large protest was organized in Banja Luka on 7 July 2018.

Journalist and blogger, Slobodan Vasković after analyzing documents and eye-witness accounts claimed in an article on 2 May 2018, that Dragičević was murdered. Chairman of the parliamentary caucus of the Serb Democratic Party (SDS) Vukota Govedarica said on 10 May 2018, that he thinks Dragičević was murdered.

=== Parliamentary Inquiry Board ===
Under constant public pressure, on 11 May 2018, the National Assembly of Republika Srpska voted to form an Inquiry Board to analyze the circumstances surrounding Dragičević's death. On 5 June 2018, the Inquiry Board adopted a 320-pages long report after hearing members of the police and public prosecutor's office, coroner Karan, and minister Lukač. The report concluded that there is more than enough evidence that Dragičević was murdered and that the public prosecutor should immediately respond to those findings.

On 3 July 2018, the National Assembly rejected the Inquiry Board's report by a majority vote. The report was supported by the opposition MPs, but rejected by the majority coalition of the Alliance of Independent Social Democrats (SNSD), the Democratic People's Alliance (DNS), the Socialist Party (SP), and two independent MPs. The Assembly majority held that the Board did not have the competency to characterize the case as a murder. Instead, they suggested the following conclusion: "The National Assembly expects the Prosecution and other law-enforcement agencies to treat the case of David Dragičević in accordance with their legally prescribes competencies and to act in accordance with the regulations of the Criminal Procedure Code, which will oblige other institutions to act accordingly." Although not accepting the report, the Assembly adopted conclusion that "the prosecutors in the case made numerous errors" and demanded that "the High Judicial and Prosecutorial Council of Bosnia and Herzegovina consider initiation of certain disciplinary procedures against the prosecutors".

== Later developments ==
=== Public prosecutor's investigation ===
After the public pressure, District public prosecutor of Banja Luka opened a murder investigation in July 2018. No suspects have been arrested.
