= Order of Miloš Obilić =

Order of Miloš Obilić Орден Милоша Обилића
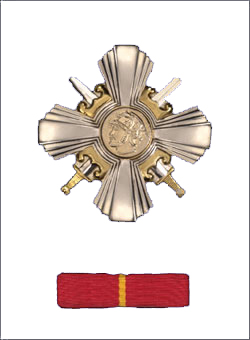
- Order of Miloš Obilić (top: Order medal; bottom: Order ribbon)
- Type: Military
- Awarded for: "excellence in the service of Army of Republika Srpska"
- Presented by: Republika Srpska
- Eligibility: Members of the Army of Republika Srpska
- Status: Active
- Established: 28 April 1993
- Ribbon of the Order of Miloš Obilić

Precedence
- Next (higher): Order of Karađorđe Star of Republika Srpska
- Next (lower): Order of Njegoš

The Order of Miloš Obilić (Serbian: Орден Милоша Обилића) is an Order of the Republic of Srpska. It is established in 1993 by the Constitution of Republika Srpska and 'Law on orders and awards' valid since 28 April 1993.

This order is awarded to the members of the Army of Republika Srpska who during the battle showed exceptional personal bravery during battle or who showed exceptional bravery in military matters. It is also awarded to non-military people who showed exceptional personal bravery in dangerous situations saving human lives and material goods.

It is named after Miloš Obilić.

== See also ==
- Miloš Obilić
- Orders, decorations and medals of Republika Srpska
