= Medal of Merit to the People (Republika Srpska) =

Republika Srpska medal

Medal of Merit to the People Медаља заслуга за народ
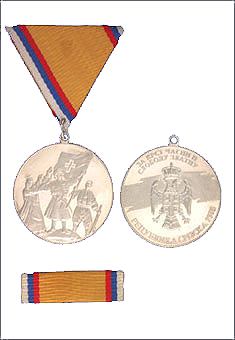
- Medal of Merit to the People (top: medal; bottom: ribbon bar)
- Type: Medal
- Presented by: Republika Srpska
- Status: Active
- Established: 28 April 1993
- Ribbon bar of the Medal of Merit to the People

Precedence
- Next (higher): Medal of Major Milan Tepić
- Next (lower): Medal for Bravery

The Medal of Merit to the People (Serbian: Медаља заслуга за народ) is a Medal of Republika Srpska. It was established in 1993 by the Constitution of Republika Srpska and 'Law on orders and awards' valid since 28 April 1993.

The Medal of Merit for the People has one class and is awarded for merits gained in the fight against the enemy, for the liberation of the country and for the contribution to the construction and development of Republika Srpska.

It is awarded in peace to individuals, institutions and other organizations for their contribution to the development and progress of Republika Srpska. The inscription on the medal reads: For the Cross of Honor and Golden Freedom, Republika Srpska.

== Notable recipients ==
- 2018 - (Slovenia) Zoran Dragić
- 2019 - (Serbia) Bojan Mikulić

== See also ==
- Orders, decorations and medals of Republika Srpska
