= Order of Karađorđe Star of Republika Srpska =

Republika Srpska order

Order of Karađorđe Star of Republika Srpska Орден Карађорђеве звијезде
- Type: State order
- Awarded for: excellence in the service of Army of Republika Srpska
- Presented by: Republika Srpska
- Status: Active
- Established: 28 April 1993
- 1st class 2nd class 3rd class Ribbon bars of the Order of Karađorđe Star of Republika Srpska

Precedence
- Next (higher): Order of the Flag of Republika Srpska
- Next (lower): Order of Miloš Obilić

Order of Karađorđe Star of Republika Srpska (Serbian: Орден Карађорђеве звијезде) is an Order of the Republic of Srpska. It was established in 1993 by the Constitution of Republika Srpska and 'Law on orders and awards' valid since 28 April 1993.

It is named after Karađorđe.

== Ranks ==
The Order of Karađorđe Star of Republika Srpska is a military decoration. This order has three classes. It was awarded for extraordinary successes in commanding and leading units of the Army of Republika Srpska in armed struggle. It can be awarded in peace for outstanding merits in the leadership and organization of the armed forces.

1st class	2nd class	3rd class

== See also ==
- Karađorđe
- Orders, decorations and medals of Republika Srpska
