= State Investigation and Protection Agency =

State police agency of Bosnia and Herzegovina

State Investigation and Protection Agency (SIPA)
- Državna agencija za istrage i zaštitu Државна агенција за истраге и заштиту
- Logo of the State Investigation and Protection Agency

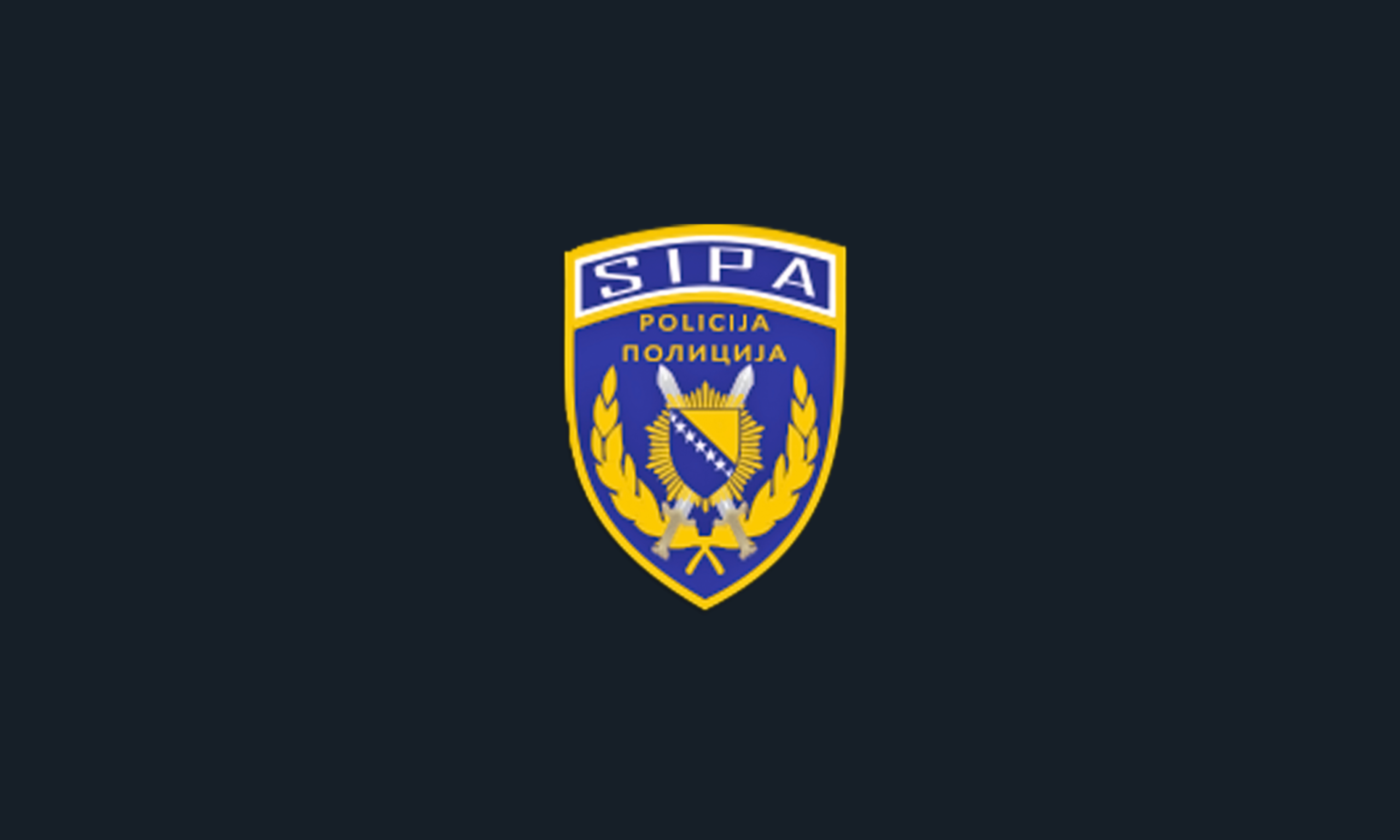
- Flag of the State Investigation and Protection Agency

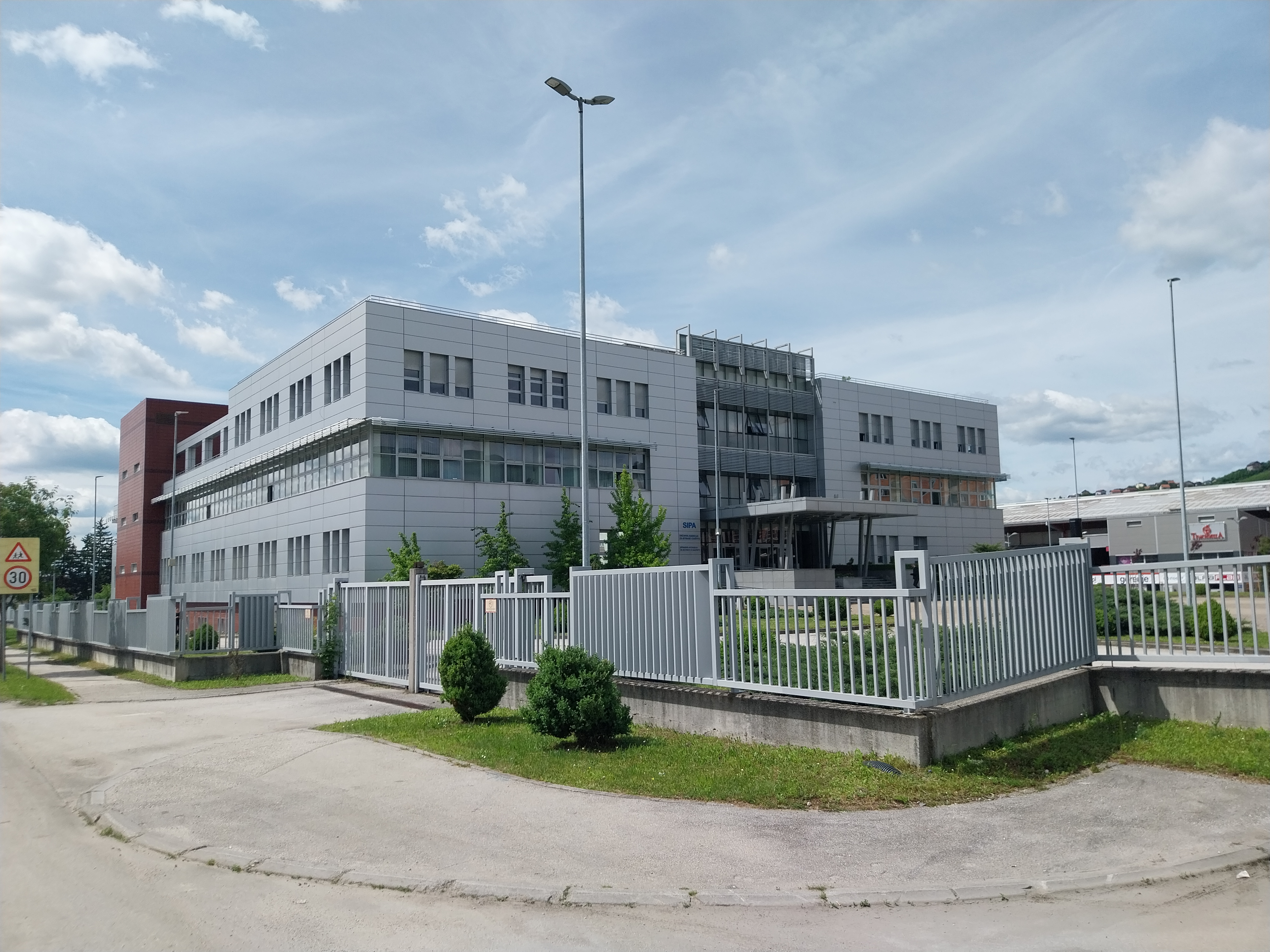
- SIPA headquarters, Istočno Sarajevo

Law enforcement/Security overview
- Formed: September 1, 2005
- Type: State Police Agency
- Jurisdiction: Bosnia and Herzegovina
- Status: Active
- Headquarters: Istočno Sarajevo, Bosnia and Herzegovina; 43°49′12″N 18°21′00″E
- Annual budget: $20 million USD
- Law enforcement/Security executives: Darko Ćulum, Director; Vacant, Deputy Director; Anđelko Hrgić, Associate Director; Jasmin Gogić, Associate Director
- Parent department: Ministry of Security of Bosnia and Herzegovina
- Key document: Law on the State Investigation and Protection Agency (Bosnia and Herzegovina)
- Website: sipa.gov.ba

The State Investigation and Protection Agency (SIPA; Serbo-Croatian: Državna agencija za istrage i zaštitu / Државна агенција за истраге и заштиту) is the national police intelligence and protective security agency of the Bosnia and Herzegovina responsible for clandestine and covert operations, countering hybrid threats, counterintelligence, counter-revolutionary, counterterrorism, executive protection (especially the Presidency of Bosnia and Herzegovina and visiting foreign leaders), intelligence gathering and assessment on threats to national security that are under the responsibility of the police authority, investigation and interrogation serious crimes, protects police operations classified information, and public security.

SIPA is under the direct administration of the Ministry of Security of Bosnia and Herzegovina.

== History ==
After the war in Bosnia and Herzegovina and the Dayton Agreement, the first organisation with very limited law enforcement authorities was the Agency for Information and Protection of Bosnia and Herzegovina (Serbo-Croatian: Agencija za informacije i zaštitu Bosne i Hercegovine / Агенција за информације и заштиту Босне и Херцеговине), established in 2002. That independent agency was responsible for collecting data of interest related to international crimes and criminal legislation of Bosnia and Herzegovina, counterintelligence that are under the responsibility of the police authority, protection of VIPs as well as diplomatic and consular missions of Bosnia and Herzegovina, and public security.

In June 2004, today's SIPA was created out of the Agency for Information and Protection of BiH. It is under the Ministry of Security, but independent in operational matters.

Under the Law on State Investigation and Protection Agency and per other regulations, SIPA performs tasks within its jurisdiction throughout the state of Bosnia and Herzegovina. It is also the basic tool of stability and the tool for making the people of Bosnia and Herzegovina feel safe and secure from threats within the state.

The activities of SIPA include the arrests of persons who are suspected of committing war crimes, as well as successful investigations of money laundering activities, combating organized crime and terrorism, provision of witnesses with protection and support, and the formation and development of a special unit.

In March 2025, in response to the guilty verdict of Milorad Dodik issued by the Court of Bosnia and Herzegovina for violating Bosnia and Herzegovina's criminal law, the entity national assembly enacted a set of laws in an attempt to prohibit SIPA (among others) from acting on the territory of the entity. However, the Constitutional Court of Bosnia and Herzegovina has annulled the set of laws enacted, pending a full decision, as the result of an appellation raised by the member of the Presidency of Bosnia and Herzegovina Denis Bećirović.

== Organization ==
SIPA started with just three employees, whereas today it has over 850 employees working in 11 organizational units at the headquarters of the agency and in four regional offices within the cities of Istočno Sarajevo, Tuzla, Banja Luka, and Mostar.

== Equipment ==
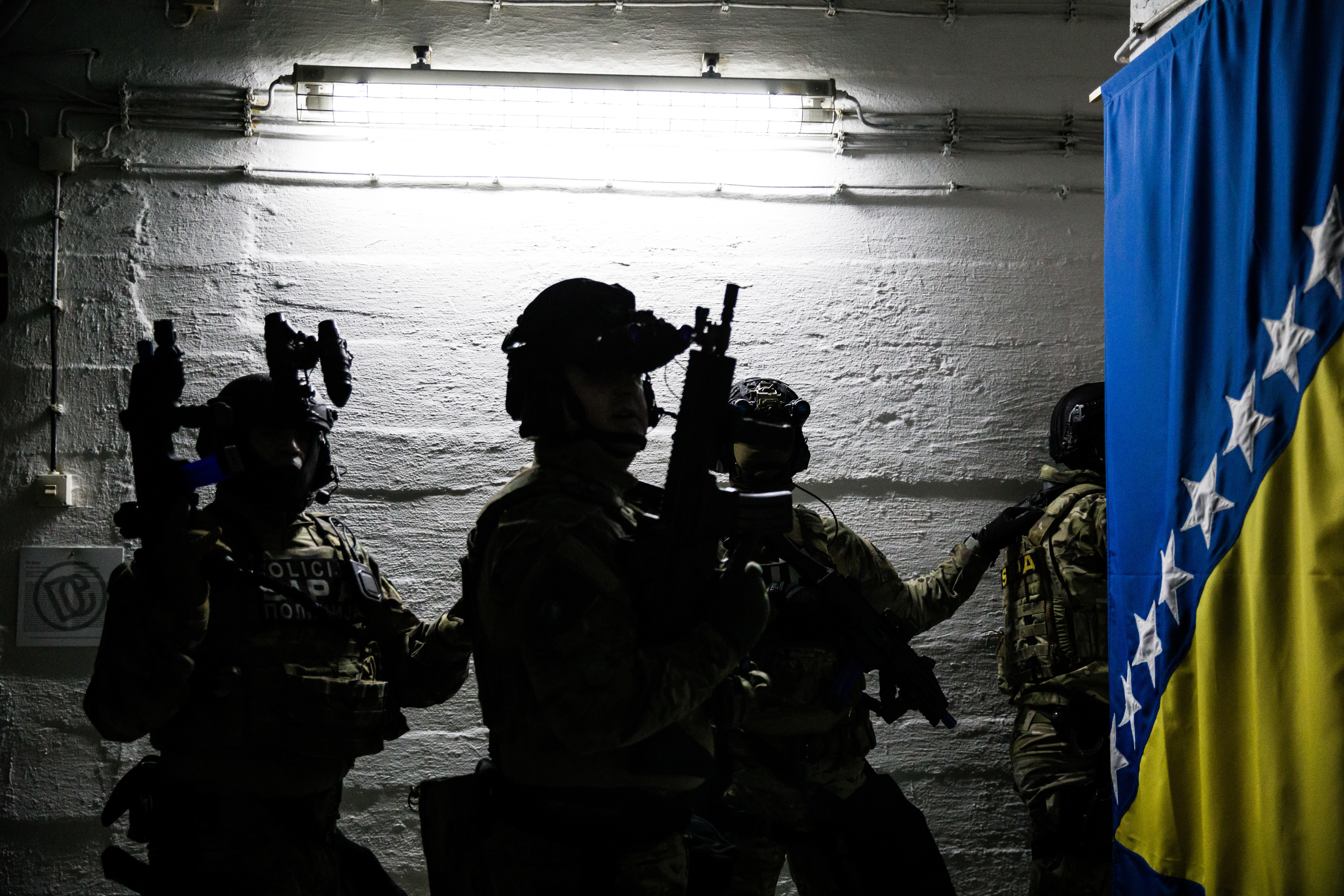
Counter-terrorism group SOF of SIPA members preparing to clear a sector.

SIPA Units are equipped, like most counter-terrorist units around the world, with a vast array of specialized firearms including the Yugoslavian-made Zastava M70, as well as other variants in 7.62 mm such as the AK74 and AK74U, as well as 5.56 mm calibre assault rifles such as the M4A1 carbine.

There are also other weapons in different calibres such as the Heckler & Koch MP5, H&K G3, G36, various sniper rifles, pistols such as the CZ 99 and Glock 17, and non-lethal weapons such as riot control agents, stun grenades, and miscellaneous equipment including heavy body armour, entry tools, and night vision optics.

SIPA currently commandeers both military and civilian grade vehicles, such as Hummers, BRDM-2s, Iveco LMVs, Toyota Land Cruisers, VW Golfs, VW Transporters and Mercedes-Benz G-270s.

For operations involving aerial insertion, the main modes of transport are three Jet Rangers, two Bell 212s, one Mil Mi-8, four SOKO Gazelle Gamas, and one UH-1H.

=== Small arms ===
Model	Image	Caliber	Type	Origin	Details
Pistols
Glock 17		9×19mm	Semi-automatic pistol	Austria	
Glock 19		9×19mm	Semi-automatic pistol	Austria	
Submachine Guns
Uzi		9×19mm	Submachine gun	Israel	Replaced by the P90.
MP5		9×19mm	Submachine gun	Germany	MP5A3 variant with a retractable stock.
FN P90		5.7×28mm	Submachine gun	Belgium	In use since 2014, replaced the Uzi.
CZ Scorpion EVO 3		9×19mm	Submachine gun	Czech Republic	A1 (select-fire) variant.
Rifles and carbines
M4A1		5.56×45mm	Carbine	United States	
FN SCAR-L		5.56×45mm	Automatic rifle	Belgium	SCAR-L CQC variant.
Zastava M21		5.56×45mm NATO	Automatic rifle	Serbia	Replaced the Zastava M70.
Zastava M70		7.62×39mm	Automatic rifle	Yugoslavia; Serbia	Replaced by the Zastava M21.
Zastava M76		7.92×57mm Mauser	Designated Marksman Rifle	Yugoslavia; Serbia	
Accuracy International AXMC		.338 Lapua Mag	Sniper rifle	United Kingdom	Purchased in 2014.
Steyr Elite		.308 Winchester	Bolt-action	Austria	Successor of the Scout.

=== Vehicles ===
Name	Image	Origin	Quantity	Notes
Land Rover Discovery		United Kingdom	Unknown	
Land Rover Defender		United Kingdom	20+	
Toyota Land Cruiser		Japan	Unknown	
Mercedes-Benz G-Class		Germany	Unknown	G55 AMG and G270 variant.
VW Golf		Germany	Unknown	
VW Passat		Germany	Unknown	
VW Transporter (T6)		Germany	Unknown	
FORD E350		United States	Unknown	Armored vehicles donated by the FBI
Peugeot 508		France	Unknown	
SsangYong Rexton		South Korea	Unknown	
Škoda Yeti		Czech Republic	Unknown	
Iveco LMV		Italy	Unknown	
BRDM-2		Soviet Union	Unknown	
BOV		Yugoslavia	7	

=== Aircraft ===
Name	Image	Origin	Quantity	Notes
Bell 206 JetRanger		United States	3	
Bell 212		United States	1	
Bell UH-1 Iroquois		United States	1	UH-1H Variant.
Mil Mi-8		Soviet Union	1	
Aérospatiale Gazelle		France; Yugoslavia	4	Manufactured by SOKO under licence.

SIPA can use helicopters used by the Armed Forces.

== International stance ==
Many ambassadors and representatives from international organizations have visited SIPA. Some embassies even donated equipment and other material and technical support. SIPA cooperates, regularly, with EUPM and ICITAP, the result of which are the tasks performed per international standards and also the staff trained at some of the most renowned police institutions throughout the world.

== Mission ==
- SIPA is a government agency within the Ministry of Security of B&H. It has operational independence; it was founded to do police work. The head of SIPA is its director.
- SIPA works based on professionalism, without representing, protecting or undermining the interests of any political party, any registered organization or society, any constituent peoples, or any other peoples in B&H.
- After adopting the following set of laws in 2004, out of the Agency for Information and Protection SIPA turned into a police body:
  - Law on State Investigation and Protection Agency,
  - Law on Police Employees,
  - Law on Prevention of Money Laundering,
  - Law on the Protection of Threatened and Endangered Witnesses,
  - Law on Witness Protection Program in B&H, etc.

Within the area of its legally determined jurisdiction, SIPA deals with the prevention, detection and investigations of organized crime, terrorism and illegal trade—ABHO, war crimes and acts punishable according to international war and humanitarian law, people trafficking, as well as all other crimes within the jurisdiction of the Court of B&H.

SIPA provides help for the Court and the Office of the Prosecutor of B&H, it deals with physical and technical protection of people, buildings and other property protected under the Law on SIPA; it also deals with witness protection, prevention of money laundering as well as other tasks determined by law and by other regulations.

== Future priorities ==
- the fight against organized crime
- investigations of terrorism and terrorist activities
- money laundering and financing of terrorist activities
- investigations of war crimes and arrests of the persons suspected of committing war crimes
