= Chen Bo (diplomat) =

Chinese diplomat (born 1970)

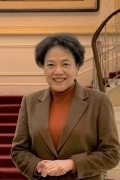
Image of Chen Bo

Chen Bo (Chinese: 陈波; born January 1970) is the Ambassador Extraordinary and Plenipotentiary of the People's Republic of China to Serbia, replacing Li Manchang, since February 2019. Before that, she was ambassador to Bosnia & Herzegovina from 2015 until 2018. In July 2023 she resigned from the position of Ambassador in Serbia to become president of China Institute of International Studies.

== Awards ==
- Order of the Flag of Republika Srpska, 2019
