= Post-conflict reception of war criminals =

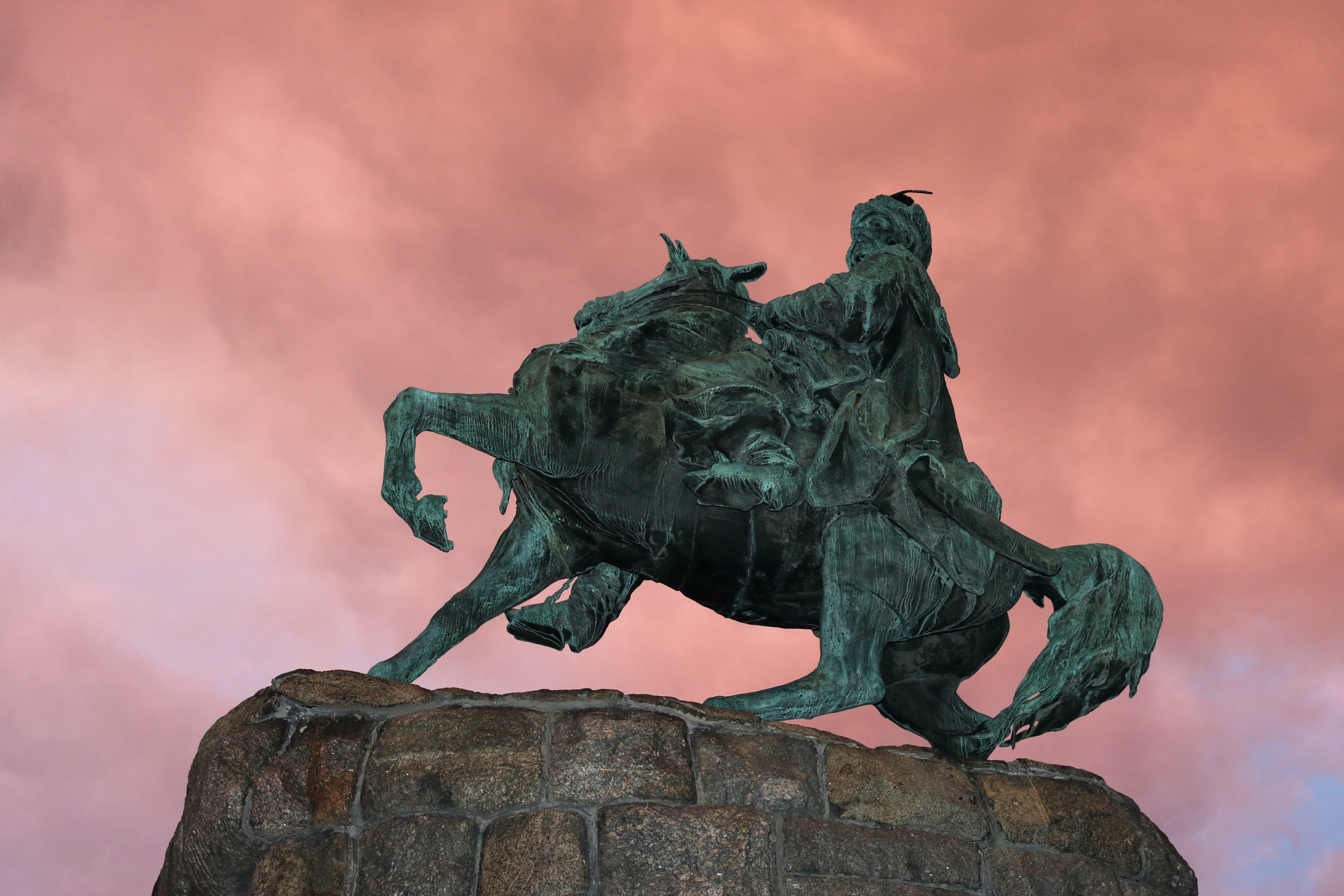
Statue of Bohdan Khmelnytsky in Kyiv

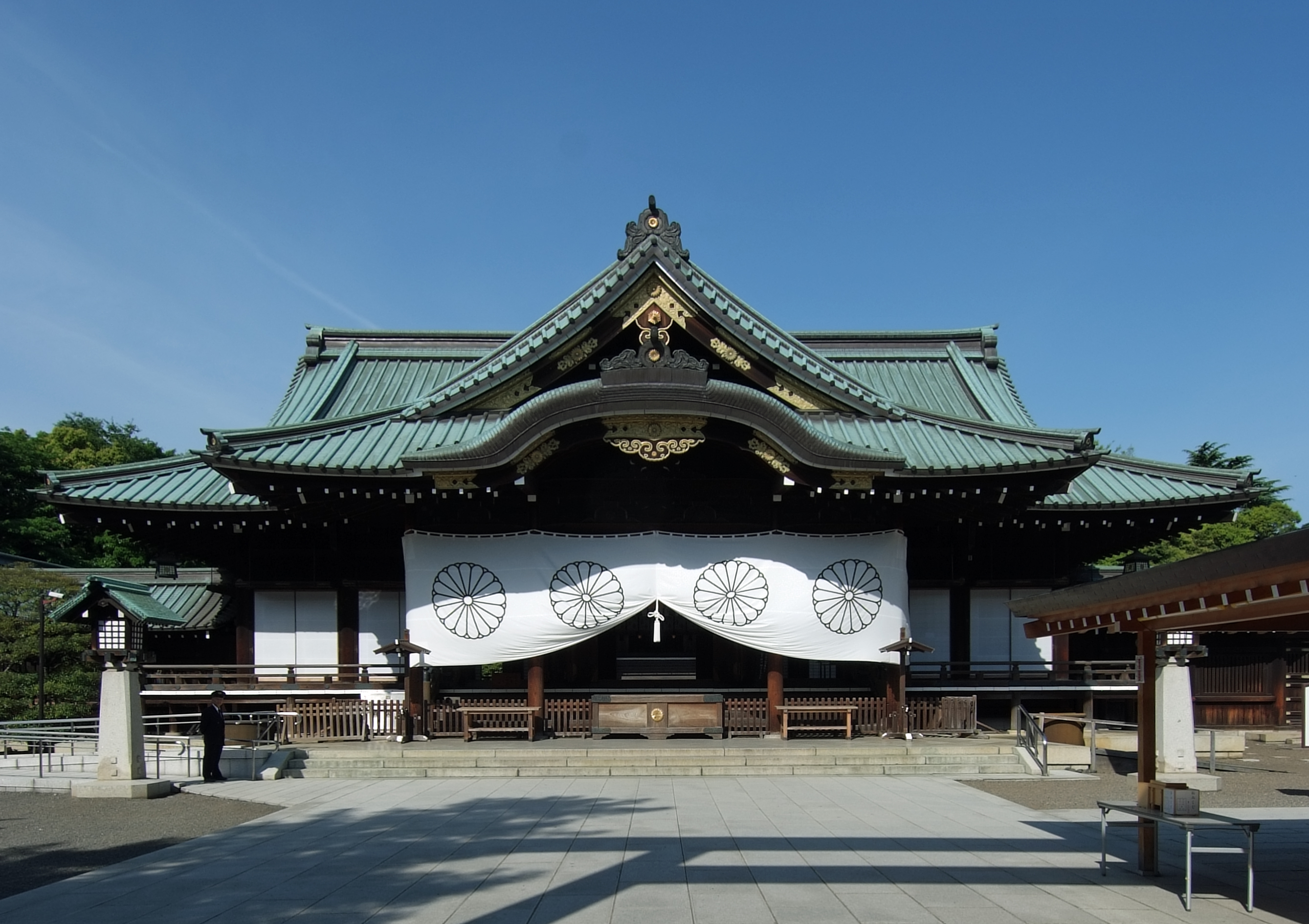
Yasukuni Shrine has been the subject of political controversies due to the war criminals enshrined there.

The reception of individuals guilty of violations of international criminal law after a conflict differs greatly, ranging from bringing them to justice in war crimes trials to ignoring their crimes or even glorifying them as heroes. Such issues have led to controversies in many countries, including Australia, the United States, Germany, the Baltic states, Japan, and the former Yugoslavia.

== By country ==
=== Australia ===
A book by Mark Aarons argues that Australia has been "a safe haven for war criminals" including Nazis, Khmer Rouge, former Chilean secret police, and those guilty of war crimes in the Yugoslav Wars. Some have played a role in Australian politics or the intelligence services.

In 2023, former Australian SAS soldier Oliver Schulz was arrested and charged with murdering unarmed Afghan civilian Dad Mohammad. He is the first person to be charged in connection with the Brereton Report, a report published by the Australian Defence Force on war crimes in Afghanistan. Schulz is also the first Australian soldier to ever be charged under Australian law with a war crime. In 2023, Australia's most decorated soldier, Ben Roberts-Smith, lost a defamation suit he filed against several publications which had accused him of being a war criminal. The case is currently under appeal.

=== Balkans ===
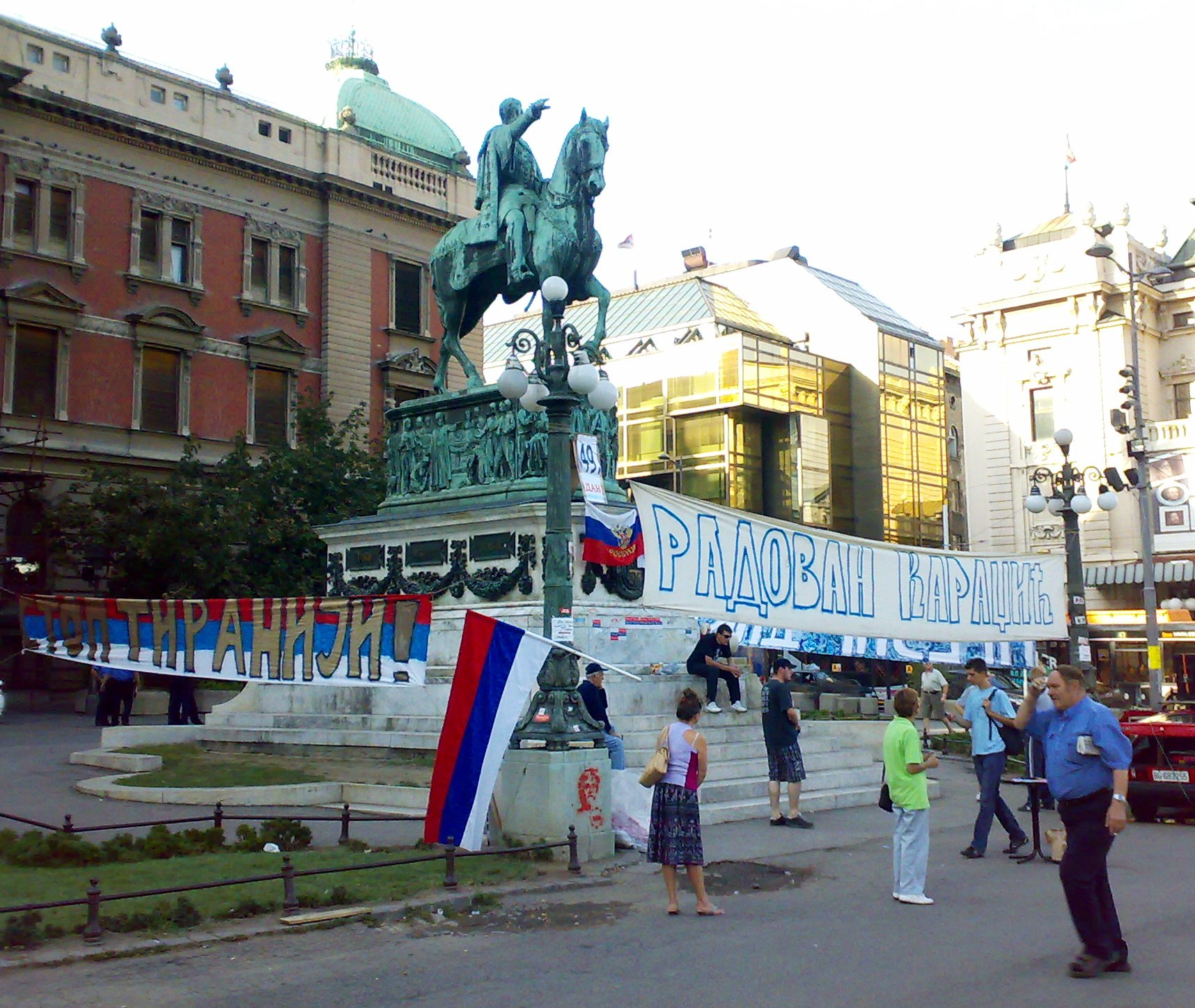
Protest against the arrest, extradition and trial of Radovan Karadžić in Belgrade, Serbia, 2008

Former President of Croatia Ivo Josipović has highlighted that former Yugoslav countries were reluctant to prosecute their own nationals for war crimes because "everybody considers their own people to be heroes and only sees the victims on their own side".

In Republika Srpska, memorials to victims of the Bosnian genocide are forbidden. Instead, memorials are erected to commemorate Serb perpetrators of war crimes such as Radovan Karadžić. Secondary school textbooks discuss Karadžić without mentioning that he was convicted of war crimes and genocide. In Serbia, convicted war criminals such as Vojislav Šešelj enjoy public support which goes along with Bosnian genocide denial as well as denial of other war crimes committed by Serbs.

After the International Criminal Tribunal for the former Yugoslavia (ICTY) convicted six Bosnian Croat military leaders of war crimes and crimes against humanity in November 2017, Prime Minister of Croatia Andrej Plenković described the verdict as a "deep moral injustice". Branimir Glavaš, a former Croatian general and current politician who was previously found guilty of torturing and murdering Serb civilians in the town of Osijek during the Croatian War of Independence, received a warm welcome following his release in 2015 which included a concert in front of 1,500 people featuring singers Miroslav Škoro and Mate Bulić.

In Kosovo, convicted war criminals such as Lahi Brahimaj and Rrustem Mustafa have been appointed to state offices. When Sylejman Selimi was released from prison after serving his sentence for war crimes, President of Kosovo Hashim Thaçi said: "Kosovo is better and safer with the living hero Sylejman Selimi at liberty." Following the death of Kosovo Albanian war crimes convict Haradin Bala in January 2018, the Assembly of the Republic of Kosovo held a minute of silence to mark his death.

Johan Tarčulovski, the only Macedonian citizen to be convicted by the ICTY, was welcomed as a hero in Skopje when he returned. He was elected to Parliament in 2016 for the ruling VMRO-DPMNE party.

=== Cambodia ===
In Cambodia, Pol Pot's tomb has been the focus of cult activities.

=== Germany ===
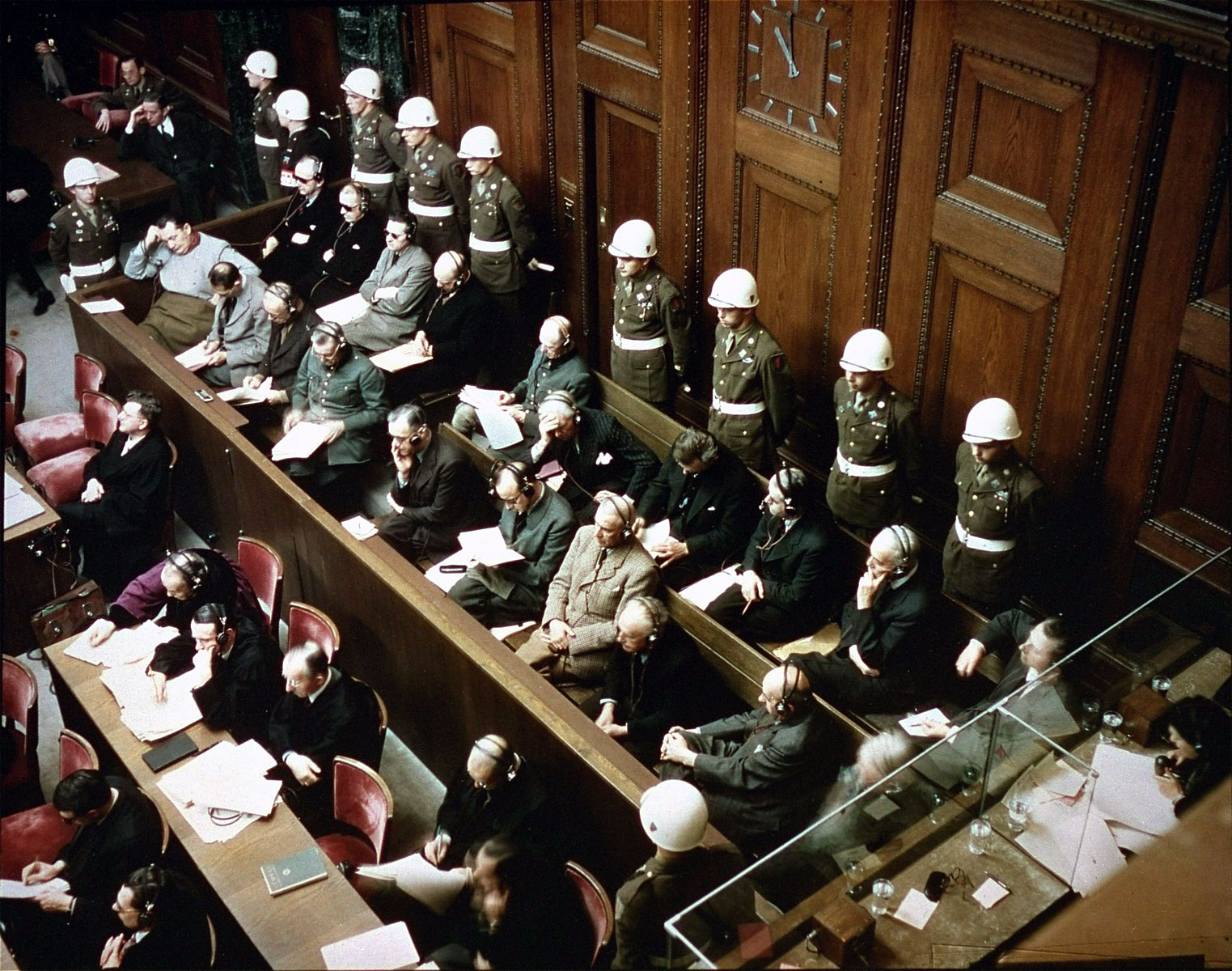
Defendants in the dock at the International Military Tribunal at Nuremberg

Some German war criminals were put on trial at the Nuremberg trials, although most escaped responsibility for their crimes. Today Germany denounces the actions of Nazi war criminals and does not have memorials to them. In contrast, there are many Holocaust memorials in Germany.

SS officer Joachim Peiper, convicted and sentenced to death for his role in the Malmedy massacre, but eventually reprieved, later achieved cult status among those who romanticize the Waffen-SS.

=== Japan ===
Major Japanese war criminals convicted and executed by the Tokyo Trial are enshrined at Yasukuni Shrine. Visits to the shrine by Japanese prime ministers have therefore been subjects of controversy.

=== Latin America ===
A number of Nazi war criminals immigrated to various countries in Latin America, including Josef Mengele, Klaus Barbie, and Franz Stangl. In 1961, Argentina protested against Israel's abduction of Adolf Eichmann, who was responsible for the deaths of millions of Jews, and initially demanded his return to Argentina. Before his abduction, Eichmann openly discussed his crimes with other German immigrants. Following his arrest a wave of antisemitic attacks were committed against Argentine Jews.

=== Latvia ===
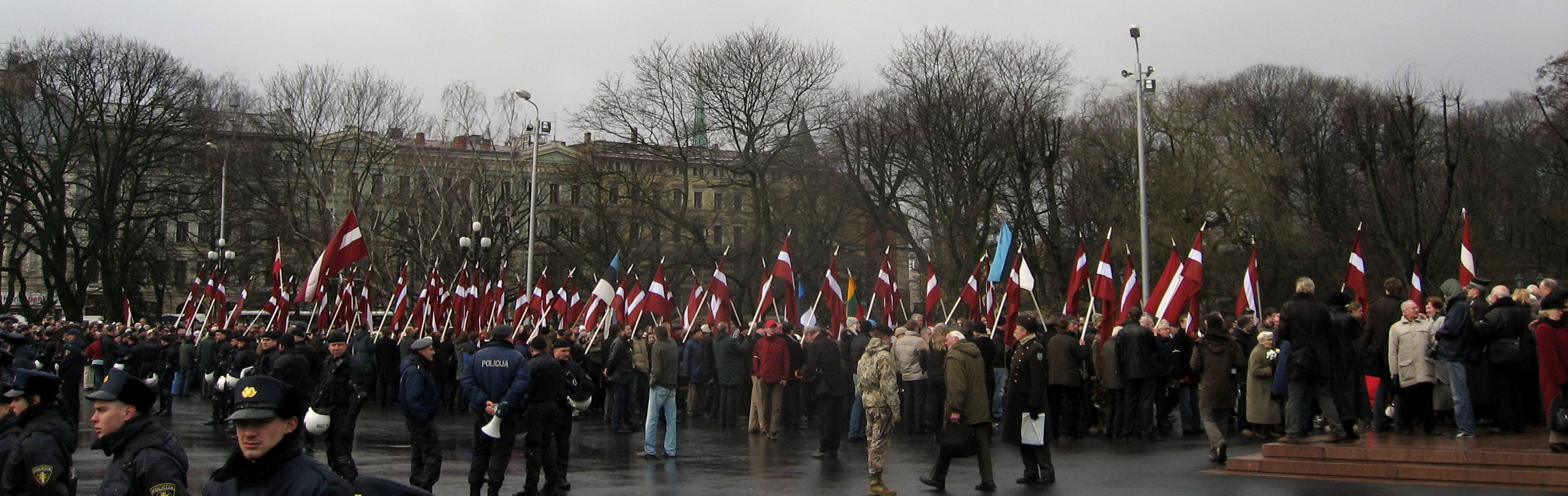
2008 Legionnaire Day procession through the flag alley at the foot of Freedom Monument

Commemoration of the Latvian Legion, a Waffen-SS formation during World War II, is controversial due to the war crimes committed by it. Remembrance Day of the Latvian Legionnaires was celebrated as a state holiday from 1998 to 2000. Annual marches continue to be held as of 2018 and are opposed by groups such as Latvia Without Fascism.

=== Lithuania ===
Controversy has arisen around figures such as Adolfas Ramanauskas, Jonas Noreika, and Juozas Ambrazevičius, who are viewed as heroes due to opposing Soviet aggression against Lithuania but who have been accused of Nazi collaboration. Noreika's involvement in the mass murder of Jews has been proven beyond any doubt. He directly gave the order to carry out the Plungė massacre, in which 1,700 Jewish men, women, and children were killed. In 1997, Noreika, who was executed by the Soviets in 1947, was posthumously the Order of the Cross of Vytis by the Lithuanian government.

=== Rwanda ===
As of 2020, Paul Kagame is president of Rwanda. He was in command of the Rwandan Patriotic Front, which committed widespread war crimes during the Rwandan Civil War, for which the commander is legally responsible under the doctrine of command responsibility. Kagame was not tried by the International Criminal Tribunal for Rwanda. According to scholar Filip Reyntjens, Kagame is "the greatest war criminal" currently in power measured by the number of people killed.

=== Sudan ===
In 2019, Omar al-Bashir, who was previously indicted by the International Criminal Court for genocide, war crimes, and crimes against humanity during the Darfur conflict, was deposed as President of Sudan and arrested. In December 2019, he was convicted of corruption and sentenced to two years' imprisonment. As of October 2020, the Sudanese government is exploring the possibility of a hybrid tribunal to try al-Bashir and others for war crimes.

=== Turkey ===
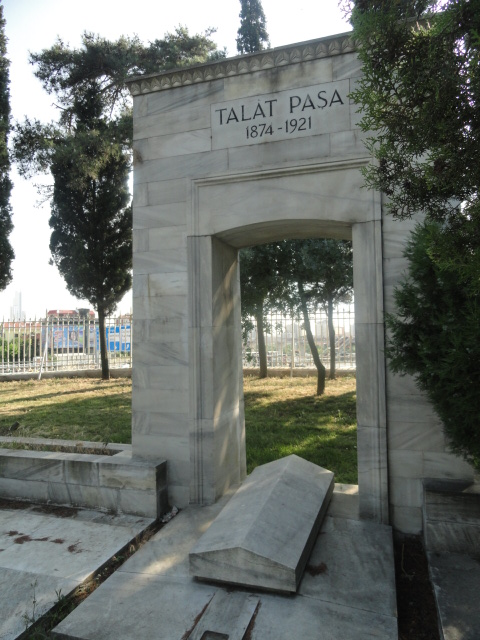
Tomb of Talaat Pasha in the cemetery of Monument of Liberty, Istanbul

Talaat Pasha, the architect of the Armenian genocide, is buried under the Monument of Liberty, Istanbul, dedicated for "heroes of the fatherland". The glorification of Talaat and other Armenian Genocide perpetrators goes along with Turkey's state-sponsored Armenian genocide denial.

=== Ukraine ===
There are competing legacies of Bohdan Khmelnytsky, who is viewed as a national hero by some but who led an uprising that involved widespread massacres of Jews. The World War II-era Ukrainian Insurgent Army (UPA) is also controversial, being viewed by some Ukrainians as a national movement. However, the UPA in collaboration with the Nazis was responsible for mass killings of Jews and Poles during the Holocaust in Ukraine. Renaming of streets after Nazi collaborators and erection of monuments to them has been criticized by civil society groups.

=== United States ===
Twenty soldiers were awarded the Medal of Honor, the United States' highest military honor, for alleged "gallantry" and "bravery" during the 1890 Wounded Knee Massacre in which hundreds of Lakota civilians were killed. In 2019, Senators Elizabeth Warren and Jeff Merkley introduced a bill to revoke the medals.

Only one United States soldier, William Calley, was convicted for the 1968 My Lai massacre of between 347 and 504 unarmed Vietnamese civilians by U.S. Army units. However, Seymour Hersh's reporting on the massacre, "I sent them a good boy and they made him a murderer", won the Pulitzer Prize.

President Donald Trump's use of pardon powers to pardon soldiers convicted of or charged with war crimes has attracted criticism. According to law professor Stuart Ford, some of the pardons are illegal under international law, which requires that countries hold war criminals accountable.
