= Orders, decorations, and medals of Republika Srpska =

Orders, decorations and medals of Republika Srpska is a system of awards in Republika Srpska. There are 15 orders and 7 medals.

The president of Republika Srpska confers decorations and awards of Republika Srpska on his/her own initiative or at the suggestion of the Office of orders of Republika Srpska (Serbo-Croatian: Канцеларија ордена Републике Српске, Kancelarija ordena Republike Srpske).

Decorations and awards can be conferred on citizens of Bosnia and Herzegovina or foreign nationals, legal entities as well as units of the Armed Forces, and the Ministry of Interior. The statute of military medals has not been updated to reflect the creation of the Armed Forces of Bosnia and Herzegovina.

Awards are regulated by the "Statutes of orders and medals of Republika Srpska" (Статути ордена и медаља Републике Српске, Statuti ordena i medalja Republike Srpske). By this statute some decorations have a patron saint and a slava.

Besides state decorations, some organizations and institutions of Republika Srpska have their own system of awards.

== Decorations ==
=== Orders by value ===
	Ribbon	Order	Class	Native name
1		Order of the Republika Srpska	Necklace	Орден Републике Српске на ленти
1		Order of the Republika Srpska	Sash	Орден Републике Српске на огрлици
2		Order of Nemanjići		Орден Немањића
3		Order of the Flag of Republika Srpska	With gold wreath	Орден заставе Републике Српске са златним вијенцем
3		Order of the Flag of Republika Srpska	With silver wreath	Орден заставе Републике Српске за сребрним вијенцем
4		Order of Karađorđe Star of Republika Srpska	1st class	Орден Карађорђеве звијезде првог реда
4		Order of Karađorđe Star of Republika Srpska	2nd class	Орден Карађорђеве звијезде другог реда
4		Order of Karađorđe Star of Republika Srpska	3rd class	Орден Карађорђеве звијезде трећег реда
5		Order of Miloš Obilić		Орден Милоша Обилића
6		Order of Njegoš	1st class	Орден Његоша првог реда
6		Order of Njegoš	2nd class	Орден Његоша другог реда
6		Order of Njegoš	3rd class	Орден Његоша трећег реда
7		Order of Honor	With golden rays	Орден части са златним зрацима
7		Order of Honor	With silver rays	Орден части са сребрним зрацима
8		Order of the Charity Cross		Орден Крст милосрђа

=== Medals by value ===
	Ribbon	Medal	Class	Native name
1		Medal of Petar Mrkonjić		Медаља Петра Мркоњића
2		Medal of Major Milan Tepić		Медаља мајора Милана Тепића
3		Medal of Merit to the People		Медаља заслуга за народ
4		Medal for Bravery	Gold	Златна медаља за храброст
4		Medal for Bravery	Silver	Сребрна медаља за храброст
5		Medal for Military Merit		Медаља за војне заслуге
6		Medal for Soldier's Virtue		Медаља за војничке врлине

== Gallery ==
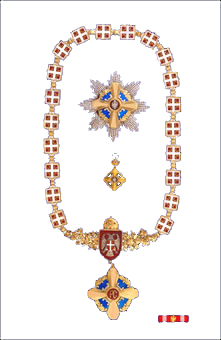
Order of the Republika Srpska on necklace

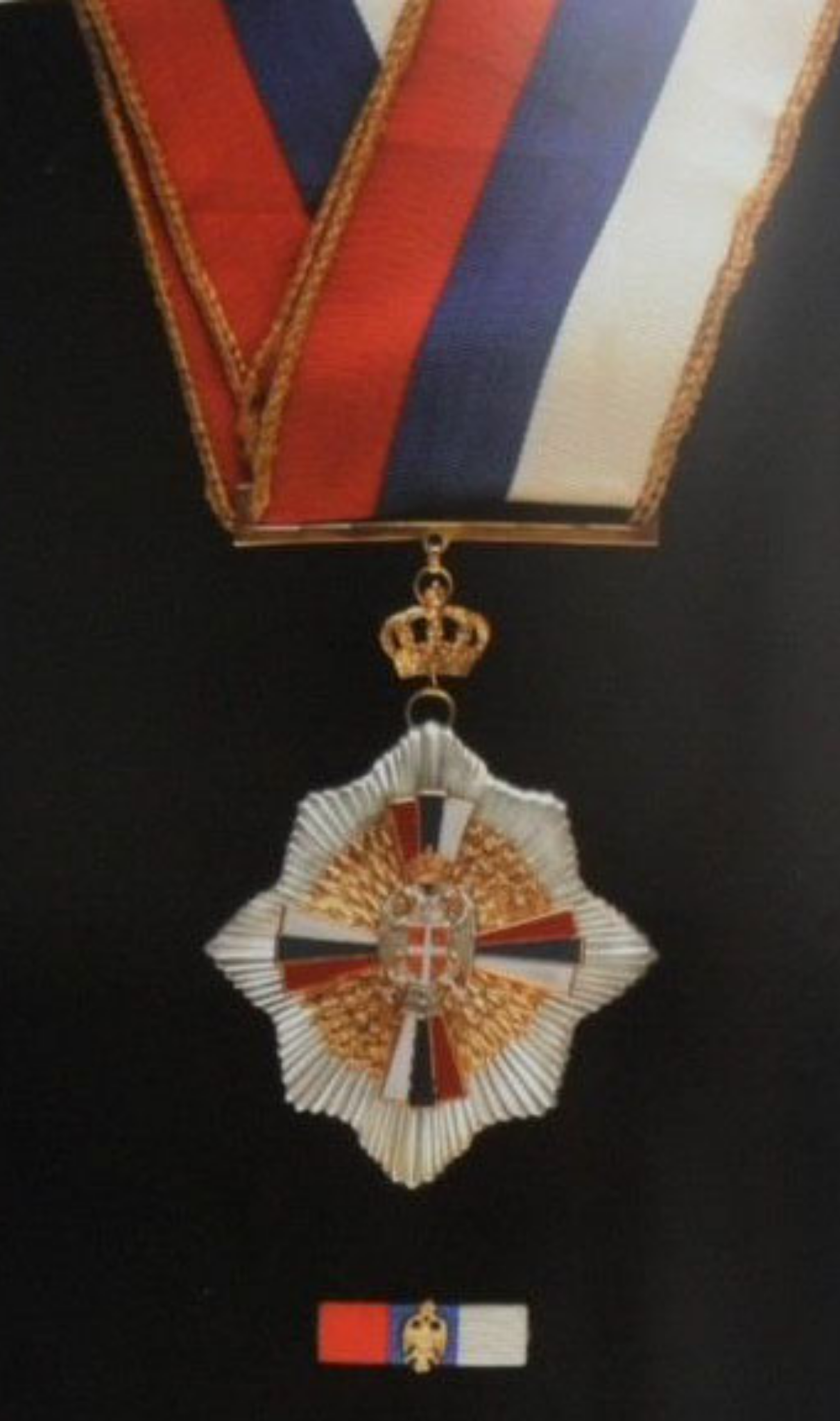
Order of the Flag of Republika Srpska with golden wreath

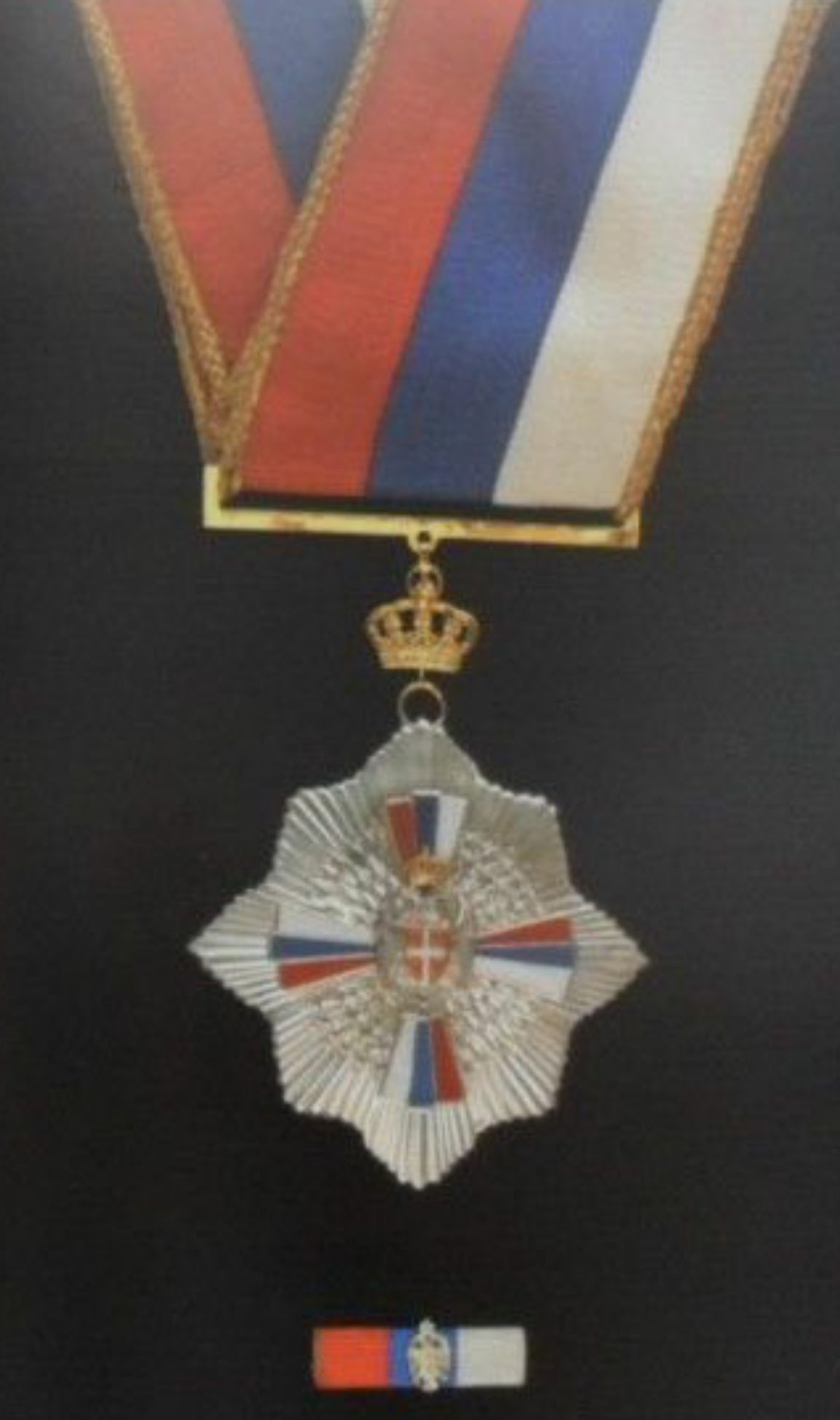
Order of the Flag of Republika Srpska with silver wreath

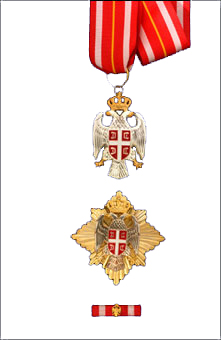
Order of Nemanjići

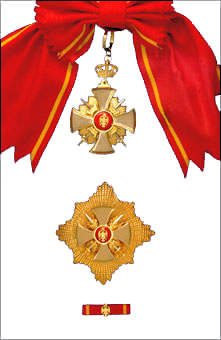
Order of Karađorđe Star 1st class

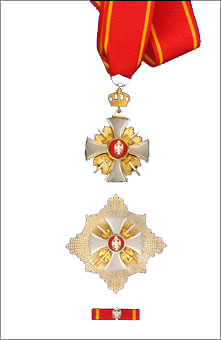
Order of Karađorđe Star 2nd class

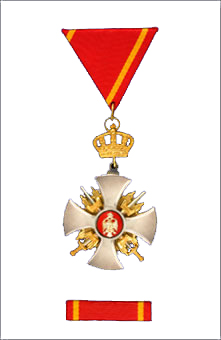
Order of Karađorđe Star 3rd class

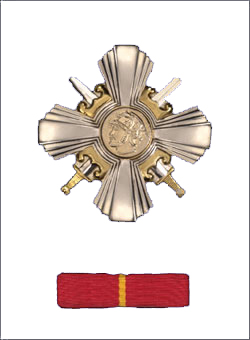
Order of Miloš Obilić

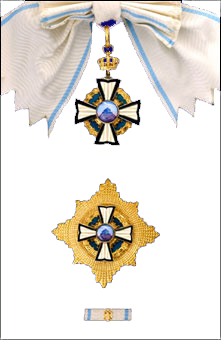
Order of Njegoš 1st class

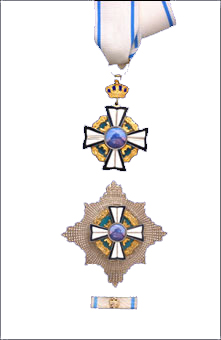
Order of Njegoš 2nd class

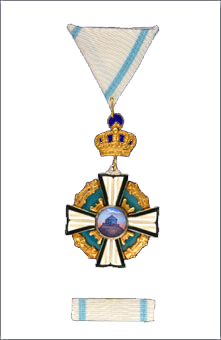
Order of Njegoš 3rd class

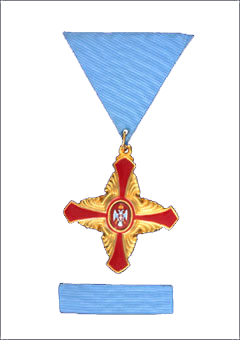
Order Charity Cross

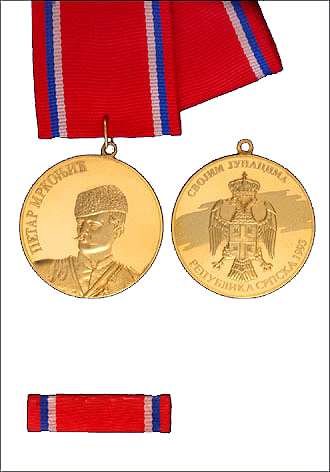
Medal of Petar Mrkonjić

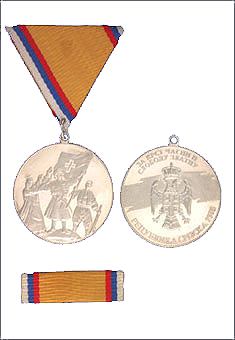
Medal of Merit to the People

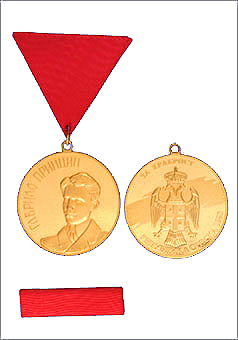
Gold Medal for Bravery

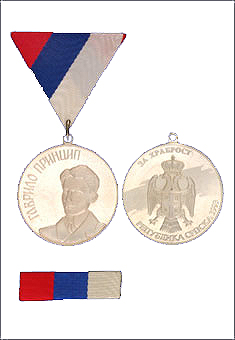
Silver Medal for Bravery

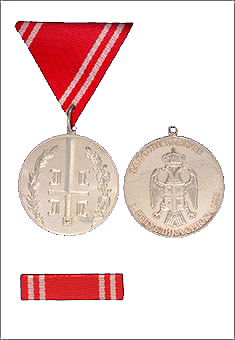
Medal for Military Merit

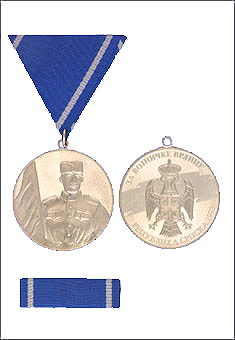
Medal for Soldier's Virtue

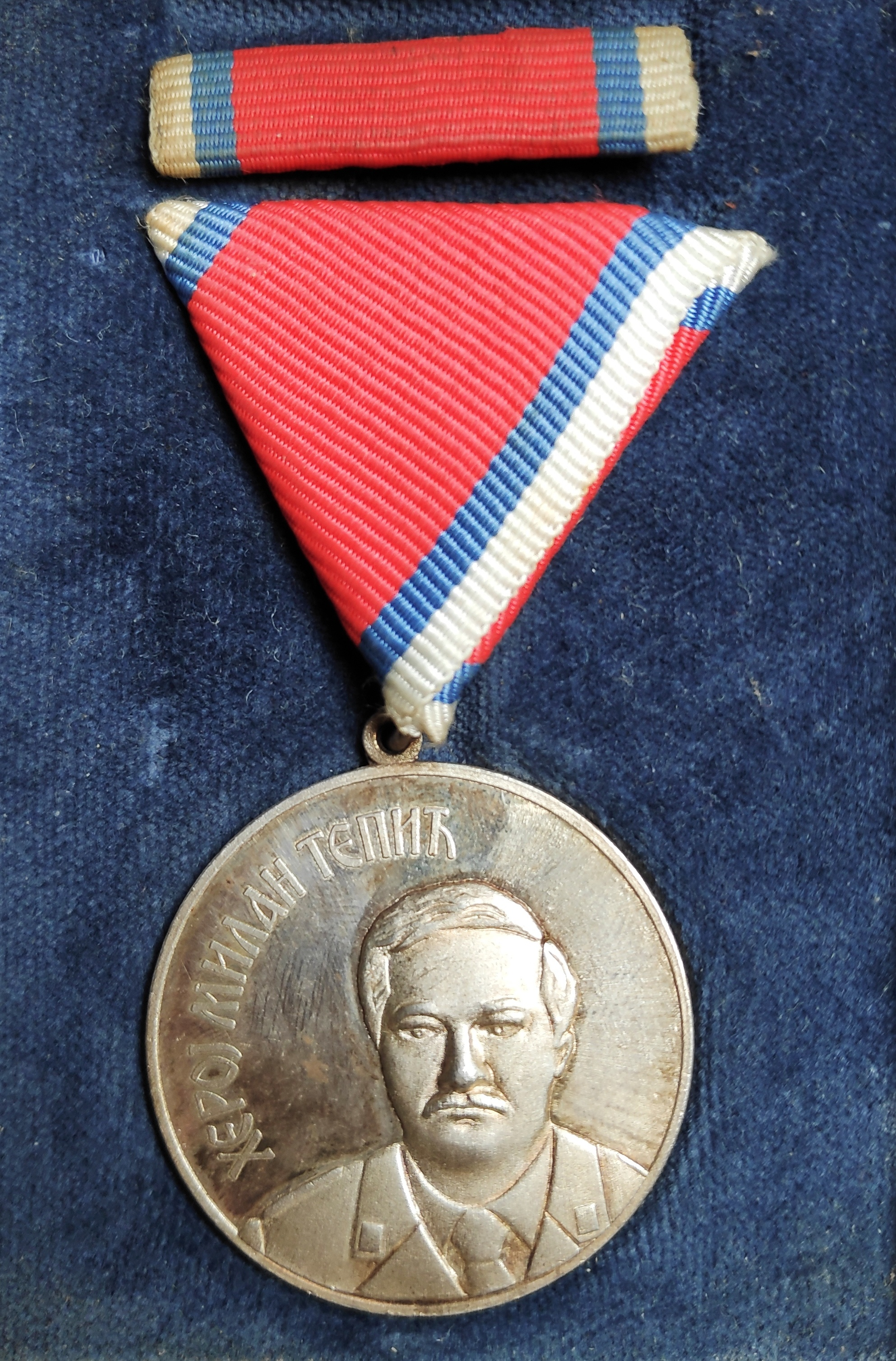
Medal of Major Milan Tepić (Obverse)

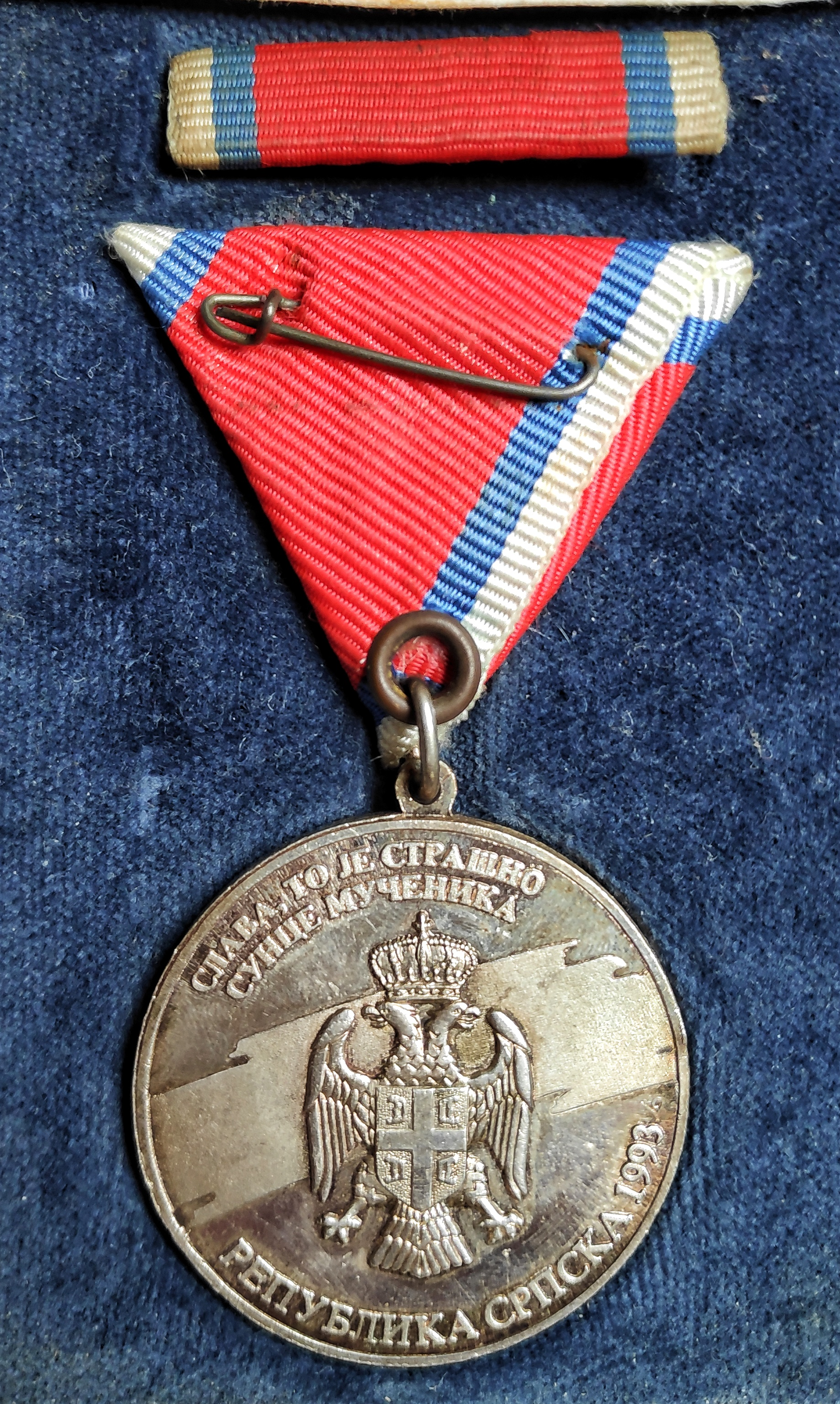
Medal of Major Milan Tepić (Reverse)
