= Lazarevo, Banja Luka =

Settlement in Bosnia and Herzegovina

Coordinates: 44°48′18″N 17°12′25″E

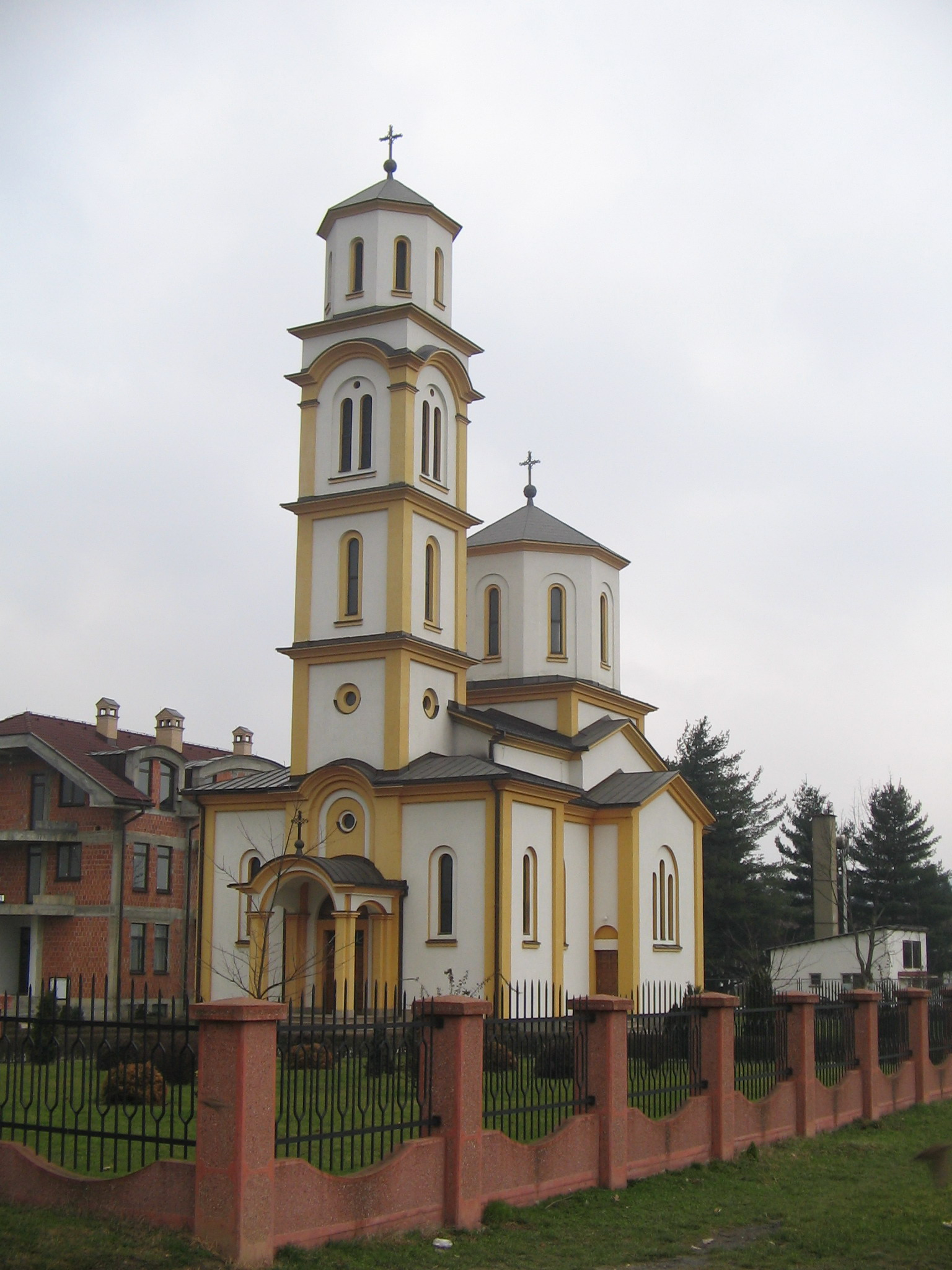
Church of Lazarevo

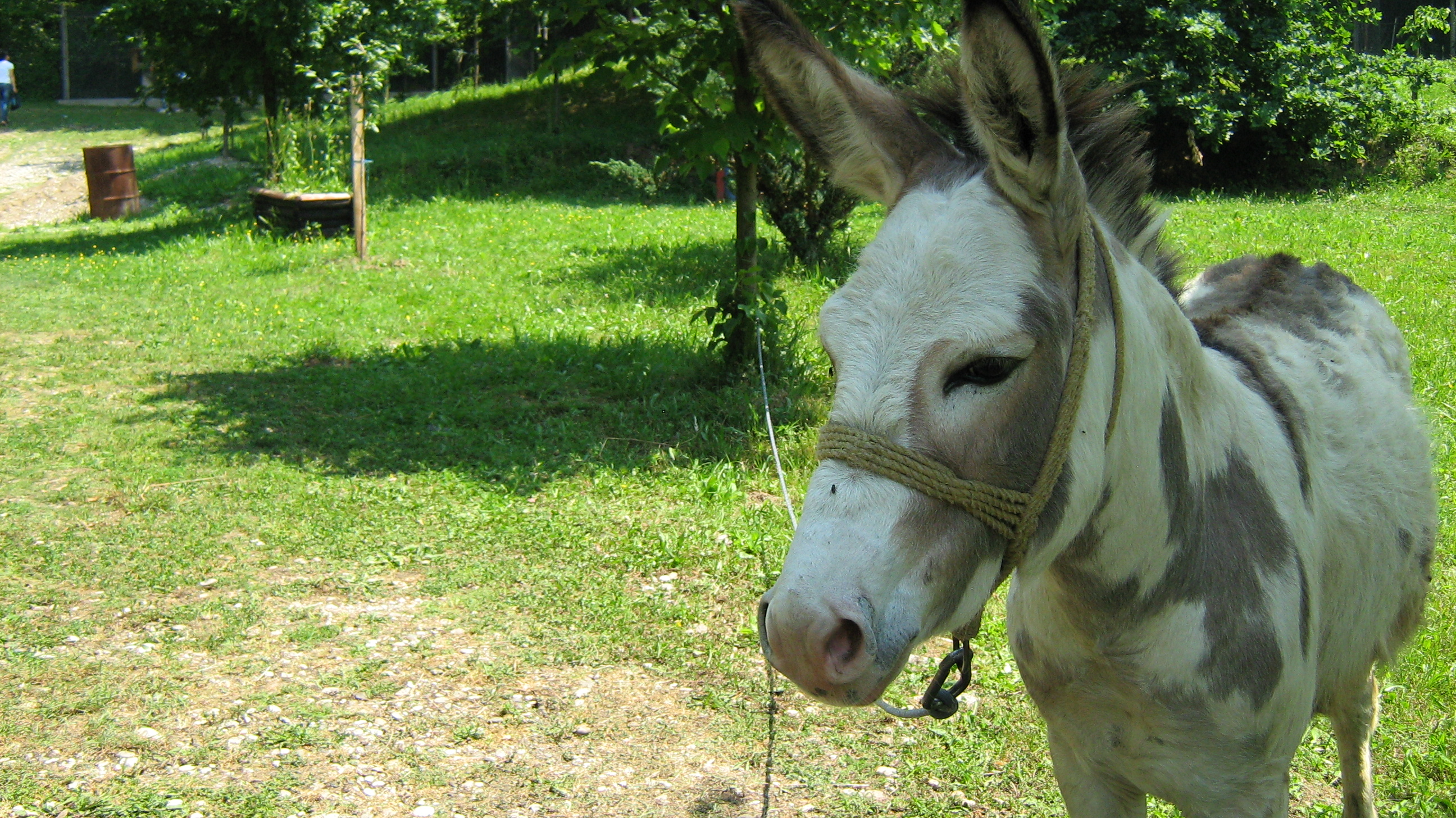
ZOO Lazarevo

Lazarevo (Serbian Cyrillic: Лазарево) is an urban neighborhood of the city of Banja Luka, in Bosnia and Herzegovina's Republika Srpska entity. Lazarevo is located in the northern part of the city, and is one of the largest neighborhoods, made up of two local communities:

- Lazarevo 1
- Lazarevo 2

The neighborhood is known for its local patriotism, graffiti, and football fans.

These names are often disregarded in casual speech and are often replaced by the term "Budžak" (Serbian Cyrillic: Буџак).

== History ==
In the first half of the 19th century, then Budžak (now Lazarеvo) was a village near Banja Luka, which was sparsely populated. The inhabitants built houses away from the main road Gradiška, since it was safer to live in during the Ottoman rule. The village expanded during the Austro-Hungarian rule, and it was under Austro-Hungarian rule that a train station was built in Lazarevo, giving it importance in the transport of goods and people. However, this train station has seen a decline in amount of trains and traffic in recent years. A hydroelectric power plant was built in Trappist, which now lays abandoned.

== Population ==
Before the Yugoslav civil wars, Lazarevo was divided into four local communities. According to the census in 1991, this town had 15,786 inhabitants.

Population Structure in 1991
Ethnicity	Amount	Percentage of total
Serbs	8642	54.7%
Croats	2913	18.4%
Muslims	1068	6.7%
Yugoslavs	2309	14.62%
Others	854	5.4%

== Religious buildings ==
There are two religious buildings: The monastery of Trappist monks, the only Trappist monastery in Southeastern Europe, which was the largest Trappist abbey in the world at the start of the 20th century with 219 monks, and an Eastern Orthodox church named "Lazarica".

== Gallery ==
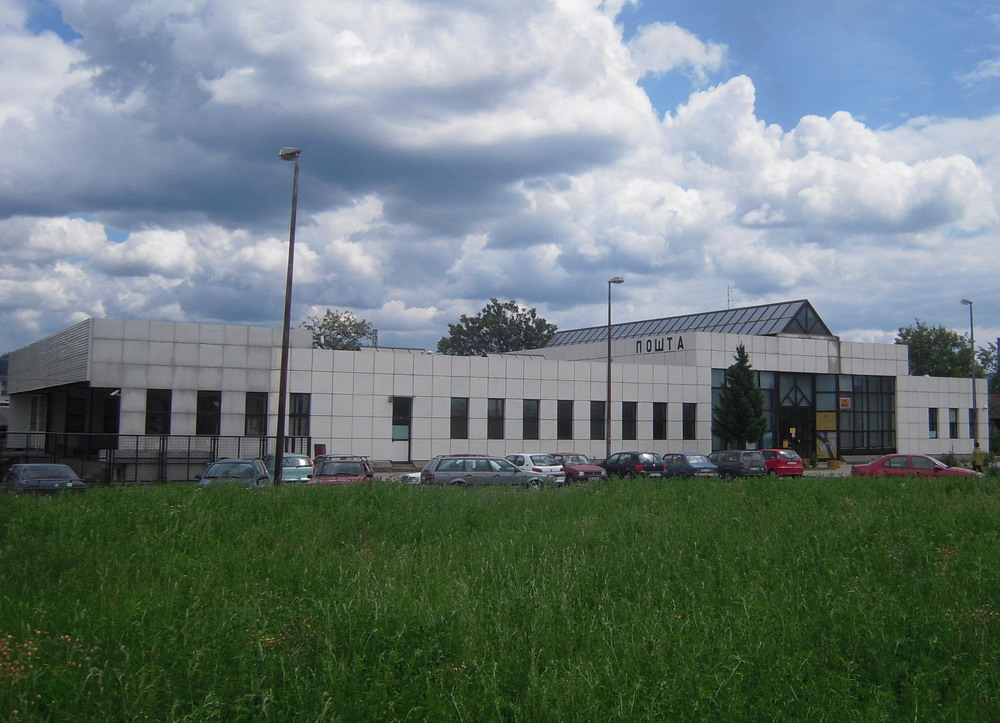
Post in the populated place Lazarevo

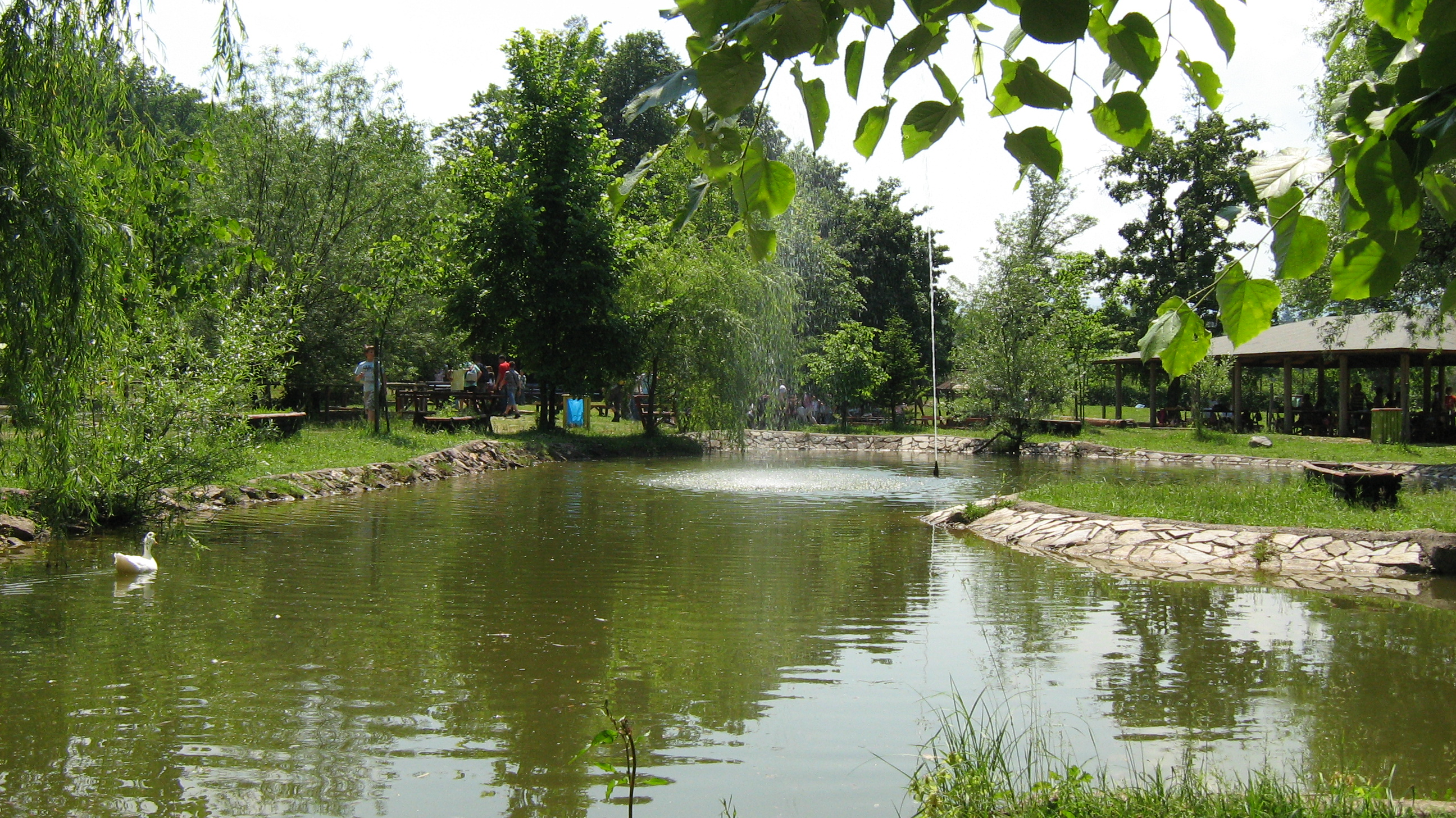
A zoo in Lazarevo

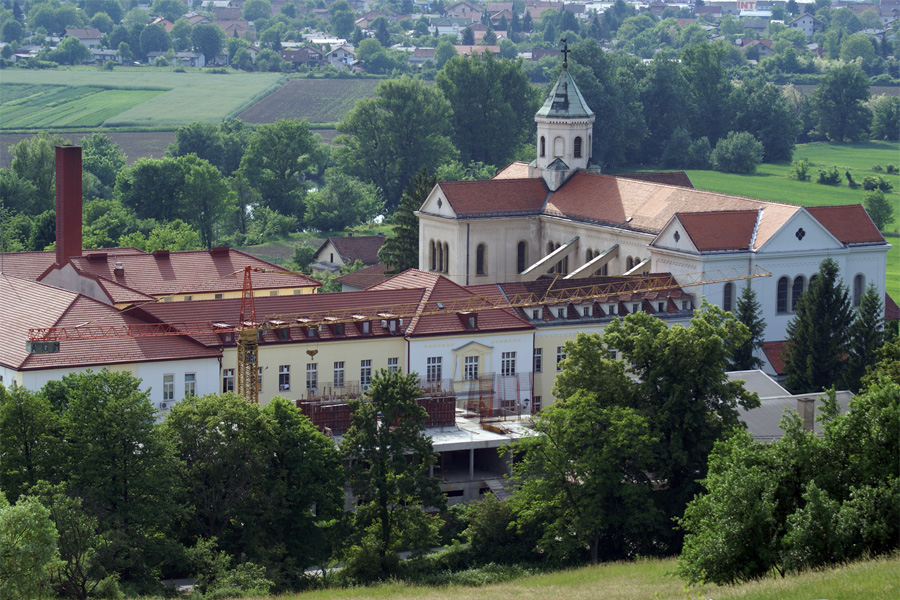
The Mariastern Trappist monastery
