= Constitution of Republika Srpska =

Supreme law of the entity of Bosnia and Herzegovina

The Constitution of Republika Srpska (Serbian: Устав Републике Српске, romanized: Ustav Republike Srpske) is the chief legal act of Republika Srpska, an entity within Bosnia and Herzegovina. The constitution was delivered by the National Assembly of Republika Srpska on 28 February 1992, but had to be revised after the Dayton Agreement was signed. It provides the set of laws and principles for the territory, and among its finest functions, it defines the internal organization of the Republic, the function of the official institutions, and the rights and freedoms for its citizens.

The Constitutional Court of Republika Srpska started its functions on 1 July 1994 and its primary role is to ensure the protection of the Constitution and the law. It is formed by nine judges, including the President, elected in accordance to the Constitution and law.

== History ==
The constitution of the Bosnian Serb Assembly was formally approved on 28 February 1992 under the designation of the Constitution of the Serb Republic of Bosnia and Herzegovina (Устав Српске Републике Босне и Херцеговине/Ustav Srpske Republike Bosne i Hercegovine). It was in effect during the Bosnian War (1992–95), and after the signing of the Dayton Agreement it underwent numerous modifications in the form of amendments to comply with the peace agreement and with the Constitutional Court of Bosnia and Herzegovina.

In March 2025, a motion was passed in the National Assembly to adopt the new Constitution that moves closer to its original form.

== Constitution ==
It is formed by 12 chapters.

I - Basic provisions

II - Human Rights and Freedoms

III - Economic and Social Planning

IV - Rights and duties

V - Organization of Republika Srpska

VI - Territorial Organization

VII - Defense

VIII - The constitutionality and legality

IX - The Constitutional Court

X - Courts and Public Prosecution

XI - Changing the Constitution

XII - Final provisions
