= 3rd electoral unit of the National Assembly of Republika Srpska =

Parliamentary constituency

3rd electoral unit
- National Assembly of Republika Srpska constituency
- Electoral unit within Republika Srpska

Current constituency
- Created: 2014
- Seats: 12

The third electoral unit of Republika Srpska is a parliamentary constituency used to elect members to the National Assembly of Republika Srpska since 2014. It consists of the Municipalities of Petrovac, Banja Luka, Čelinac, Istočni Drvar, Ribnik, Mrkonjić Grad, Jezero, Kneževo, Kotor Varoš, Šipovo and Kupres.

== Demographics ==
Ethnicity	Population	%
Bosniaks	15,087	5.7
Croats	6,508	2.5
Serbs	236,223	89.1
Did Not declare	2,959	1.1
Others	3,821	1.4
Unknown	391	0.1
Total	264,989	

== Representatives ==
Convocation	Deputies											
2014–2018	Igor Radojičić (SNSD)	Zoran Tegeltija (SNSD)	Gordana Tešanović (SNSD)	Srđan Amidžić (SNSD)	Čedo Vuković (SNSD)	Nenad Stevandić (SDS)	Nedeljko Glamočak (SDS)	Davor Šešić (SDS)	Nedeljko Čubrilović (DNS)	Branislav Borenović (PDP)	Dragan Čavić (NDP)	Nedeljko Milaković (SP)
2018–2022	Vlado Đajić (SNSD)	Zoran Tegeltija (SNSD)	Gordana Tešanović (SNSD)	Nikola Špirić (SNSD)	Igor Crnadak (PDP)	Natalija Trivić (SDS)	Draško Stanivuković (PDP)	Davor Šešić (SDS)	Nedeljko Čubrilović (DNS)	Milan Radovac (PDP)	Dragan Čavić (NDP)	Goran Selak (SP)
2022–2026	Vlado Đajić (SNSD)	Mladen Ilić (SNSD)	Nataša Radulović (SNSD)	Boris Pašalić (SNSD)	Nebojša Drinić (PDP)	Milan Radović (SDS)	Draško Stanivuković (PDP)	Alen Šeranić (SNSD0	Milan Savanović (ZPR)	Mirna Savić-Banjac (PDP)	Nenad Stevandić (US)	Velibor Stanić (SP)
