= COVID-19 pandemic in Bosnia and Herzegovina =

- Disease: COVID-19
- Pathogen: SARS-CoV-2
- Location: Bosnia and Herzegovina
- First outbreak: Austria; Germany; Italy; Serbia; Switzerland; Turkey; U.S.
- Index case: Banja Luka
- Arrival date: 5 March 2020 (6 years, 7 months and 4 days ago)
- Confirmed cases: 404,289
- Recovered: 376,654 (1 October 2022)
- Deaths: 16,419
- Fatality rate: 4.06%
- Vaccinations: 943,394 (total vaccinated); 846,080 (fully vaccinated); 1,924,950 (doses administered)

Government website
- Federation B&H; Republika Srpska; Brčko District

The COVID-19 pandemic in Bosnia and Herzegovina was a part of the worldwide pandemic of coronavirus disease 2019 (COVID-19) caused by severe acute respiratory syndrome coronavirus 2 (SARS-CoV-2). The virus was confirmed to have reached Bosnia and Herzegovina on 5 March 2020, when a patient in Banja Luka, who had travelled to Italy, tested positive. Later on the same day, a second case, who was the son of the first case, was reported. On 21 March, the first death in the country from COVID-19 was announced in a hospital in Bihać. The patient was an elderly woman who had been hospitalized two days before.

On 17 March 2020, the Council of Ministers of Bosnia and Herzegovina declared a state of emergency in the entire country.

As of 28 January 2022, 1,924,950 COVID-19 vaccine doses have been administered in Bosnia and Herzegovina.

== Background prior confirmation ==
=== Origins ===
On 12 January 2020, the World Health Organization (WHO) confirmed that a novel coronavirus was the cause of a respiratory illness in a cluster of people in Wuhan, Hubei, China, which was reported to the WHO on 31 December 2019.

The case fatality ratio for COVID-19 has been much lower than SARS of 2003, but the transmission has been significantly greater, with a significant total death toll.

=== Suspected cases ===
Up until 25 February 12 people were under surveillance as suspected cases. In Sarajevo, three Chinese tourists who were showing symptoms had negative test results for the virus.

On 2 March, a man from Tomislavgrad was suspected to have brought the virus from Italy, and was sent to Mostar for a health checkup. His test result was negative.

== Major events after confirmation ==
On 5 March 2020, health officials from Republika Srpska confirmed the first case of COVID-19 in the country. Later the same day, the second case was confirmed. These cases were a father and son who were thought to have contracted the virus while visiting Italy.

On 9 March, the fifth case in Bosnia and Herzegovina was confirmed in the town of Zenica, which was the first confirmed case within the Federation of Bosnia and Herzegovina.

On 15 March, the 24th case was confirmed in Domaljevac-Šamac. This patient got the disease in Germany, unlike all others that could be traced to Italy.

On 16 March, the Republika Srpska Ministry of Health announced the first two recoveries, both from Banja Luka.

On 20 March, the first cases were confirmed in the capital, Sarajevo.

On 21 March, the first death in the country from coronavirus was announced in a hospital in Bihać. The patient was an elderly woman who had been hospitalized two days before.

On 23 March, the first cases in Brčko District were confirmed. The cases were two people who arrived to Brčko from the Caribbean via airports in France and Serbia.

By May 16, 2020, more than 2,200 COVID-19 cases had been recorded in both entities, with a mortality rate of 5.8% (131 of 2,231 cases).

On 29 August 2020, war criminal Momčilo Krajišnik tested positive for COVID-19. On 15 September 2020, Krajišnik died from COVID-19.

=== Cluster related to "Igman Konjic" congress ===
A number of cases in the Federation of Bosnia and Herzegovina are related to one congress held in Konjic on 11 March 2020, where company "Igman" from Konjic marked 70 years of company existence, and where around 200 people were present. Beside confirmed cases of people from Konjic, among those people there were confirmed cases of people from Visoko, Tešanj, Goražde, Novi Travnik and Sarajevo. This case got media attention after it was revealed that one person from Serbia was present at this event, and after he got back to Serbia he tested positive for COVID-19. Since this confirmation on 16 March, all participants have had to go into obligatory self-isolation, and among people present on this event there were Bosnian singer Berin Buturović who was positive for coronavirus, as well as Bosnian politician Fadil Novalić who received a negative result. On 24 March, the first death from this cluster was reported, who was a driver of the director of this company.

== Measures ==
=== Bosnia and Herzegovina ===
The Presidency of Bosnia and Herzegovina announced Armed Forces' placement of quarantine tents at the country's borders intended for Bosnian citizens returning home. Every Bosnian citizen arriving to the country is obligated to self-quarantine for 14 days starting from the day of arrival. Tents will be set up on the northern border with Croatia.

On 15 March 2020, the Council of Ministers of Bosnia and Herzegovina issued a decision which forbids for foreign nationals entering Bosnia and Herzegovina to enter from areas with intensive transmission of coronavirus, and especially from: provinces of the PRC (Wuhan), South Korea, Japan, Italy, Iran, France, Romania, Germany, Austria, Spain, Switzerland and Belgium.

On 24 March 2020, Council of Ministers of Bosnia and Herzegovina issued a decision which bans entrance for all foreigners, and also from 30 March 2020 all borders at airports in Bosnia and Herzegovina will be closed for passengers, and airplanes could land only to deliver cargo. On 21 May 2020, Council of Minister adopted a decision which allows entry and stay of a foreigner who enters Bosnia and Herzegovina due to business obligations, provided that they have an invitation letter from a legal entity from Bosnia and Herzegovina that hires them in Bosnia and Herzegovina and a certificate of a negative test for SARS-CoV-2 virus from an authorized laboratory, not older than 48 hours from the time of entry. Citizens of Croatia, Montenegro and Serbia can enter Bosnia and Herzegovina without any additional condition from 1 June 2020.

The effects of restrictive measures and their relaxation were scientifically analyzed. After the authorities lifted mandatory quarantine restrictions, the instantaneous reproduction number increased from 1.13 on 20 May to 1.72 on 31 May.

=== Federation of Bosnia and Herzegovina ===
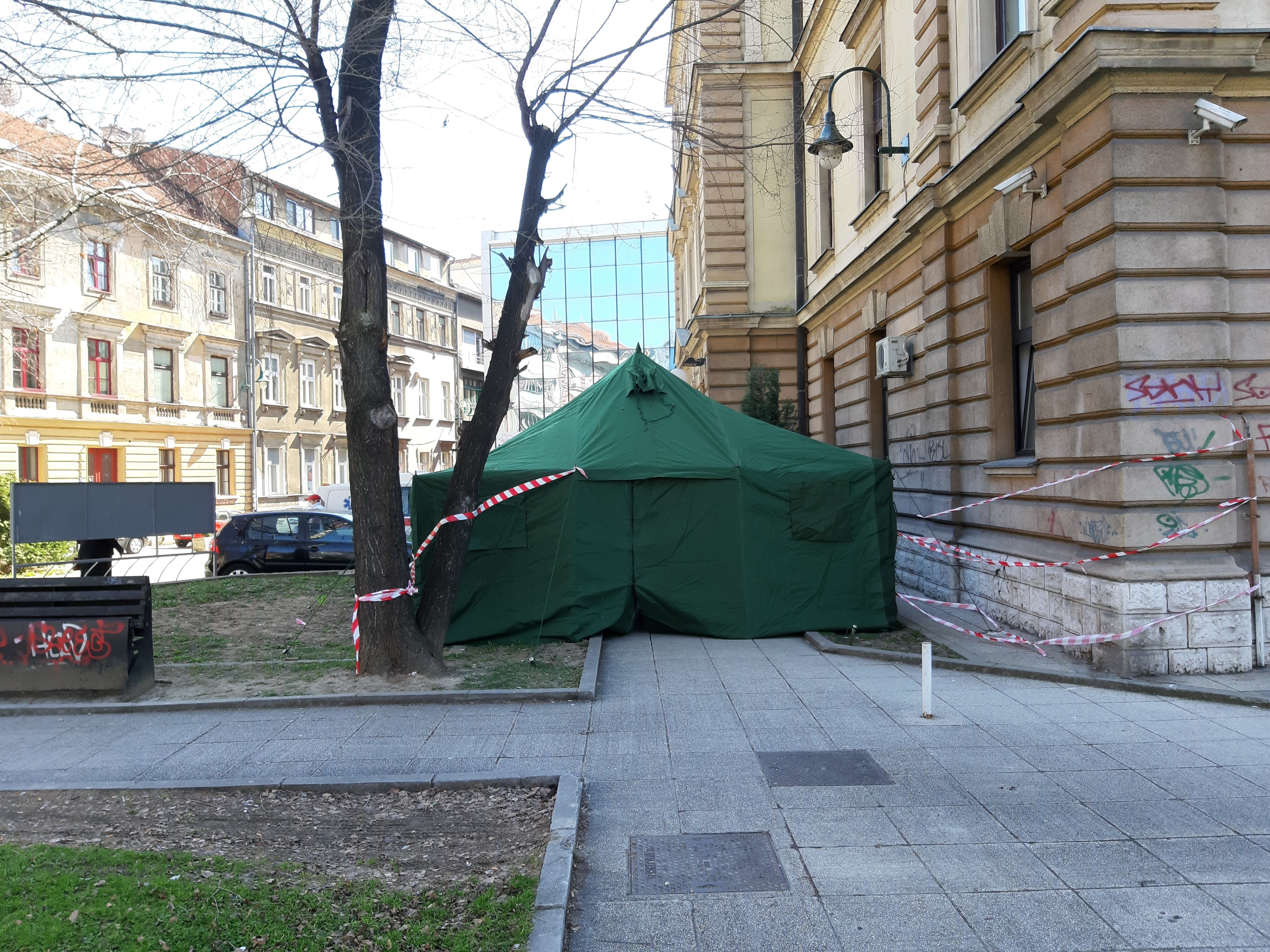
Triage tent located in Sarajevo during the COVID-19 pandemic

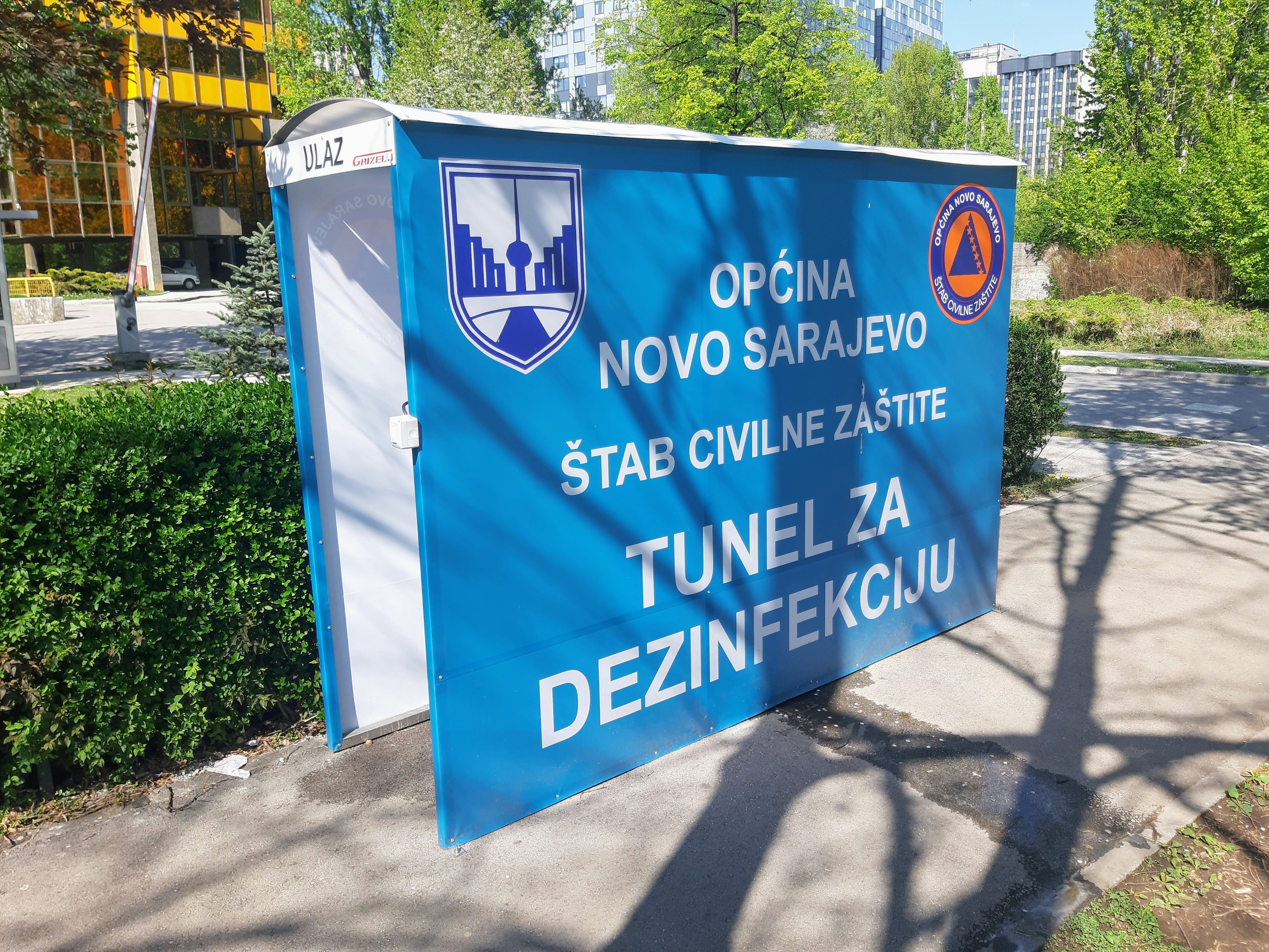
Disinfection tunnel located in municipality of Novo Sarajevo

On 11 March, the Federation of Bosnia and Herzegovina, had enacted a 2-week shutdown of all schools, high schools and universities to contain the spread of the virus, which was later prolonged by all cantons.

On 16 March, Federation of Bosnia and Herzegovina already had acts of profiteering. Fines have already been passed to local pharmacies and stores who used this situation and high demand for anti-bacterial gels/sprays and surgical masks. They lifted the prices as much as 3 times of the usual price. Federal inspection has given out fines in the sum of 43,500 km (~22,000 Euros).

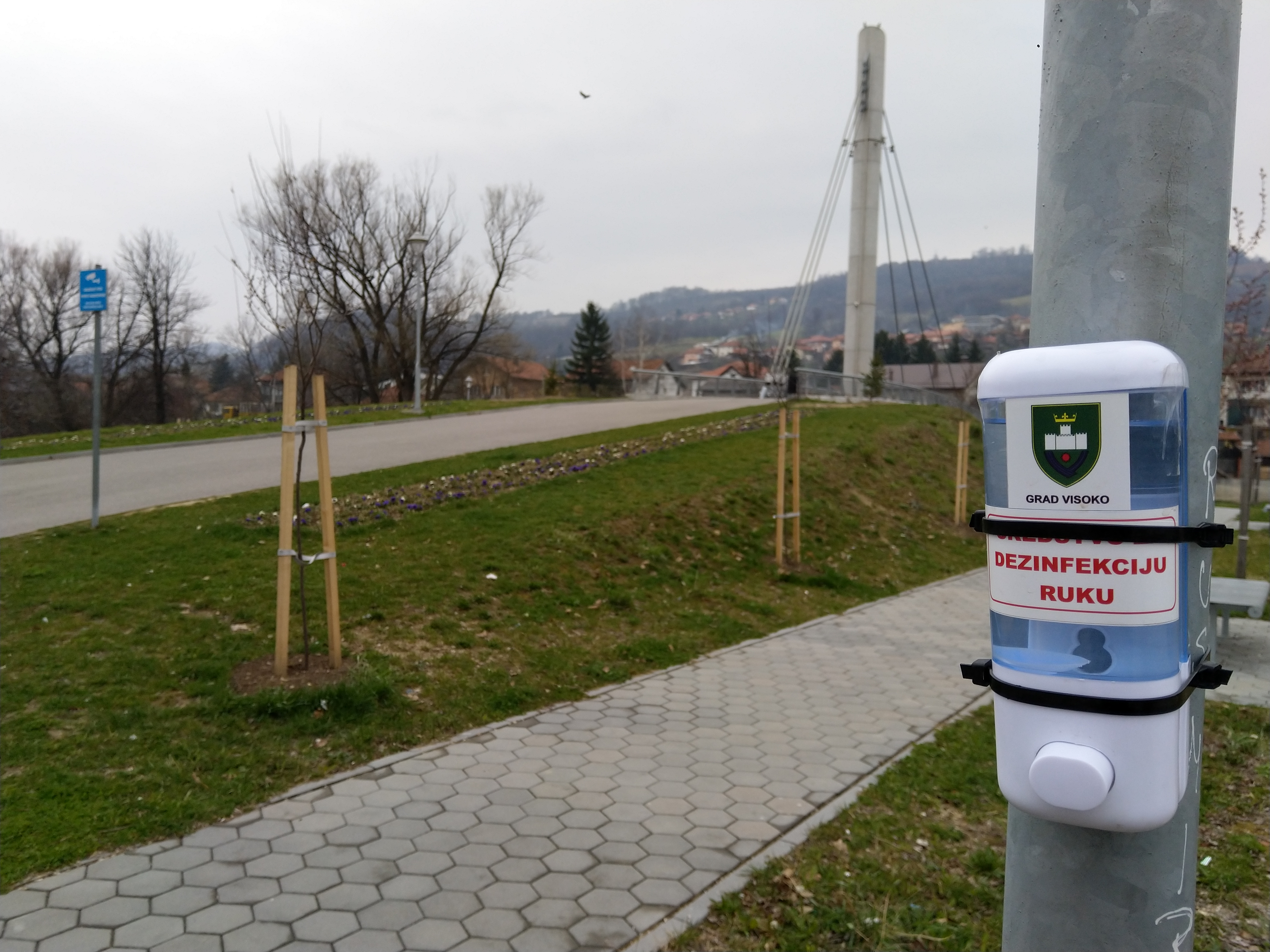
One of many hand sanitizers attached to a lamp post in Visoko

The Headquarters of Federation of B&H issued on 18 March an order that banned all public gatherings, suspending the operation of all catering facilities for the preparation and sale of food and beverages, restaurants, pizzerias, confectioneries, beauty salons, hookah bars, coffee bars, discos, tea shops, cafes, private dentists.

Some cities, such as Visoko, installed hand sanitizers through the city, in addition to frequent overnight disinfection of streets.

Other cities, like Cazin and Gradačac, crafted and installed disinfection tunnels, and had organised volunteer clubs, for example The Youth Crisis Staff in Cazin.

The civil protection service of Federation of B&H on 20 March 2020 issued an order, which banned the movement of people under the age of 18 and over 65 in the Federation of BiH.

On 21 March 2020, a curfew was introduced for the entire Federation of Bosnia and Herzegovina every day from 18:00 until 05:00, and its implementation started on 22 March 2020. On 29 March 2020, time for curfew was changed to 20:00 until 05:00. Curfew in Federation of Bosnia and Herzegovina was in force until 24 April 2020.

Croatia national football team manager Zlatko Dalić donated 40,000 HRK to Fra Mihovil Sučić Hospital in his hometown Livno, as well as Utah Jazz and Croatia men's national basketball team player Bojan Bogdanović who donated 50,000 USD to University Clinical Hospital in his hometown Mostar.

The group of researchers from the University Clinical Hospital Mostar reported the mortality was 5% during the first two months of the COVID-19 pandemics in Mostar. Furthermore, they concluded that fewer COVID-19 patients per million inhabitants died during the analyzed period, as compared with that in richer countries.

On 18 April 2020, final examination for the students of primary and secondary education were cancelled in Sarajevo Canton. Few days later, Tuzla Canton had also cancelled final examination for the students of primary and secondary education.

As of 31 May 2020, the public gathering is allowed for up to 100 people indoors and up to 300 people outdoors. Also during the course of May, BiH representatives have allowed work in most of the industries including cafes, private medical services (such as dentists) restaurants and beauty saloons with respecting the social distance as well as hygiene. Night clubs are still under restrictions.

=== Republika Srpska ===
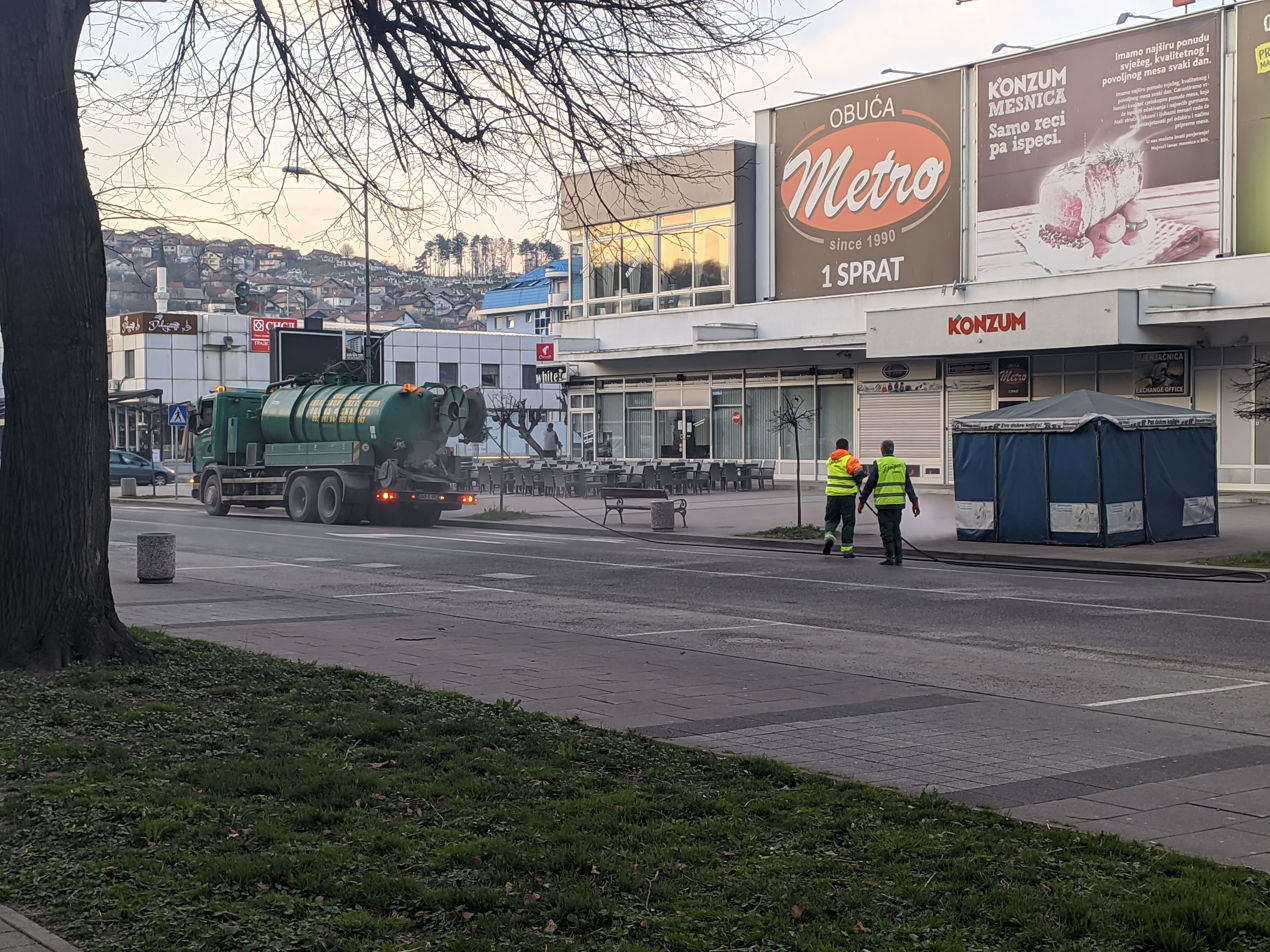
Coronavirus street disinfection in Doboj

Republika Srpska was first to implement measures, beginning from cities of Banja Luka and Doboj, where business hours were either limited or all business completely forbidden. The Ministry of Health and Social Security ordered the disinfection of all public spaces and property. Student dormitories in the city of Banja Luka were evacuated for immediate disinfection.

On 10 March 2020, Republika Srpska had officially enacted a ban on all public gatherings, shut down all schools, and banned entry to all tourists coming from any of the COVID-19 infected countries across the world to contain the spread of the virus within the country.

Between 12 and 13 March, numerous cities have made decisions to limit the work of grocery stores, restaurants, cafés and completely limit the work of gyms and fitness centers. Banja Luka, Čelinac, Prnjavor, Mrkonjić Grad and Doboj are some of the cities that made these restrictions.

On 15 March 2020, Banja Luka has decided to close all restaurants and cafés in the city, with the exception of drugstores, hotels and motels, where drugstores will be working until 22h and hotels will be working until 18h.

The Minister of Health and Social Security, Alen Šeranić, reported that 2,026 people are under surveillance in Republika Srpska. Šeranić also noted that only citizens arriving from abroad would be allowed the virus testing, and quarantine will be made mandatory.

On 21 March 2020, a curfew was introduced in entire Republika Srpska every day from 20:00 until 05:00, and a total ban of movement for people older than 65. During certain holidays (Easter, Labour Day and Đurđevdan), curfew time was prolonged. Curfew in Republika Srpska was in force until 22 May 2020.

On 28 March 2020, the National Assembly declared the state of emergency in Republika Srpska, which came into force on 3 April 2020.

=== Brčko District ===
The Government of Brčko District is regularly adopting measures for control and prevention of the COVID-19 pandemic and publish them on their official website. Since 22 March 2020, it is prohibited in Brčko District to gather and move in public places and open or closed public areas in a group of three or more persons throughout the day, and a curfew was introduced in entire Brčko District every day from 21:00 until 05:00. On 7 May 2020, the curfew time was changed from 22:00 until 05:00. Curfew in Brčko District was in force until 22 May 2020.

== Statistics ==
=== Cumulative number of cases, recoveries and deaths ===
View source data.

=== New cases per day ===
View source data.

=== Deaths per day ===
View source data.
- Source: Daily reports of Institute for Public Health of the Federation of Bosnia and Herzegovina, Institute for Public Health of Republika Srpska and Department of Health of Brčko District

== Municipalities and Cantons affected ==
As of 14 August 2020, people from following municipalities of Republika Srpska have been infected:

Entity	Municipalities affected	Cases	Deaths	Recoveries
Republika Srpska	Banja Luka, Berkovići, Bijeljina, Bileća, Bratunac, Brod, Čajniče, Čelinac, Derventa, Doboj, Donji Žabar, Foča, Gacko, Gradiška, Han Pijesak, Istočna Ilidža, Istočni Drvar, Istočni Stari Grad, Istočno Novo Sarajevo, Jezero, Kalinovik, Kneževo, Kostajnica, Kotor Varoš, Kozarska Dubica, Krupa na Uni, Kupres, Laktaši, Lopare, Ljubinje, Milići, Modriča, Mrkonjić Grad, Nevesinje, Novi Grad, Novo Goražde, Osmaci, Oštra Luka, Pale, Pelagićevo, Petrovac, Petrovo, Prijedor, Prnjavor, Ribnik, Rogatica, Rudo, Sokolac, Srbac, Srebrenica, Šamac, Šekovići, Šipovo, Stanari, Teslić, Trnovo, Trebinje, Ugljevik, Višegrad, Vlasenica, Vukosavlje, Zvornik	Total only	Total only	Total only
Total		50,816	2,550	37,924
As of 26 March 2021

As of 26 March 2021, people from following cantons and municipalities in the Federation of Bosnia and Herzegovina have been infected:

Canton	Municipalities affected	Cases	Deaths	Recoveries
Canton 10	All municipalities affected: Bosansko Grahovo, Drvar, Glamoč, Kupres, Livno, Tomislavgrad	3,819	89	3,590
Bosnian-Podrinje Canton	All municipalities affected: Foča-Ustikolina, Goražde, Pale-Prača	1,473	49	1,096
Central Bosnia Canton	All municipalities affected: Bugojno, Busovača,Dobretići, Donji Vakuf, Fojnica, Gornji Vakuf-Uskoplje, Jajce, Kiseljak, Kreševo, Novi Travnik, Travnik, Vitez	5,001	377	3,982
Herzegovina-Neretva Canton	All municipalities affected: Čapljina, Čitluk, Jablanica, Konjic, Mostar, Neum, Prozor-Rama,Ravno, Stolac	21,154	288	18,598
Posavina Canton	All municipalities affected: Domaljevac-Šamac, Odžak, Orašje	1,047	67	929
Sarajevo Canton	All municipalities affected: Centar, Hadžići, Ilidža, Ilijaš, Novi Grad, Novo Sarajevo, Stari Grad, Trnovo, Vogošća	39,624	823	31,779
Tuzla Canton	All municipalities affected: Banovići, Čelić, Doboj East, Gračanica, Gradačac, Kalesija, Kladanj, Lukavac, Sapna, Srebrenik, Teočak, Tuzla, Živinice	15,525	705	13,273
Una-Sana Canton	All municipalities affected: Bihać, Bosanska Krupa, Bosanski Petrovac, Bužim, Cazin, Ključ, Sanski Most, Velika Kladuša	3,572	181	2,950
West Herzegovina Canton	All municipalities affected: Grude, Ljubuški, Posušje, Široki Brijeg	6,527	146	4,102
Zenica-Doboj Canton	All municipalities affected: Breza, Doboj South, Kakanj, Maglaj, Olovo, Tešanj, Usora, Vareš, Visoko, Zenica, Zavidovići, Žepče	8,349	739	6,705
Total		106,152	3,464	87,002
As of 26 March 2021

As of 14 August 2020, 245 people from Brčko District in total have been infected.

	Cases	Deaths	Recoveries
Brčko District	3,401	193	3,214
As of 25 March 2021

== Impact ==
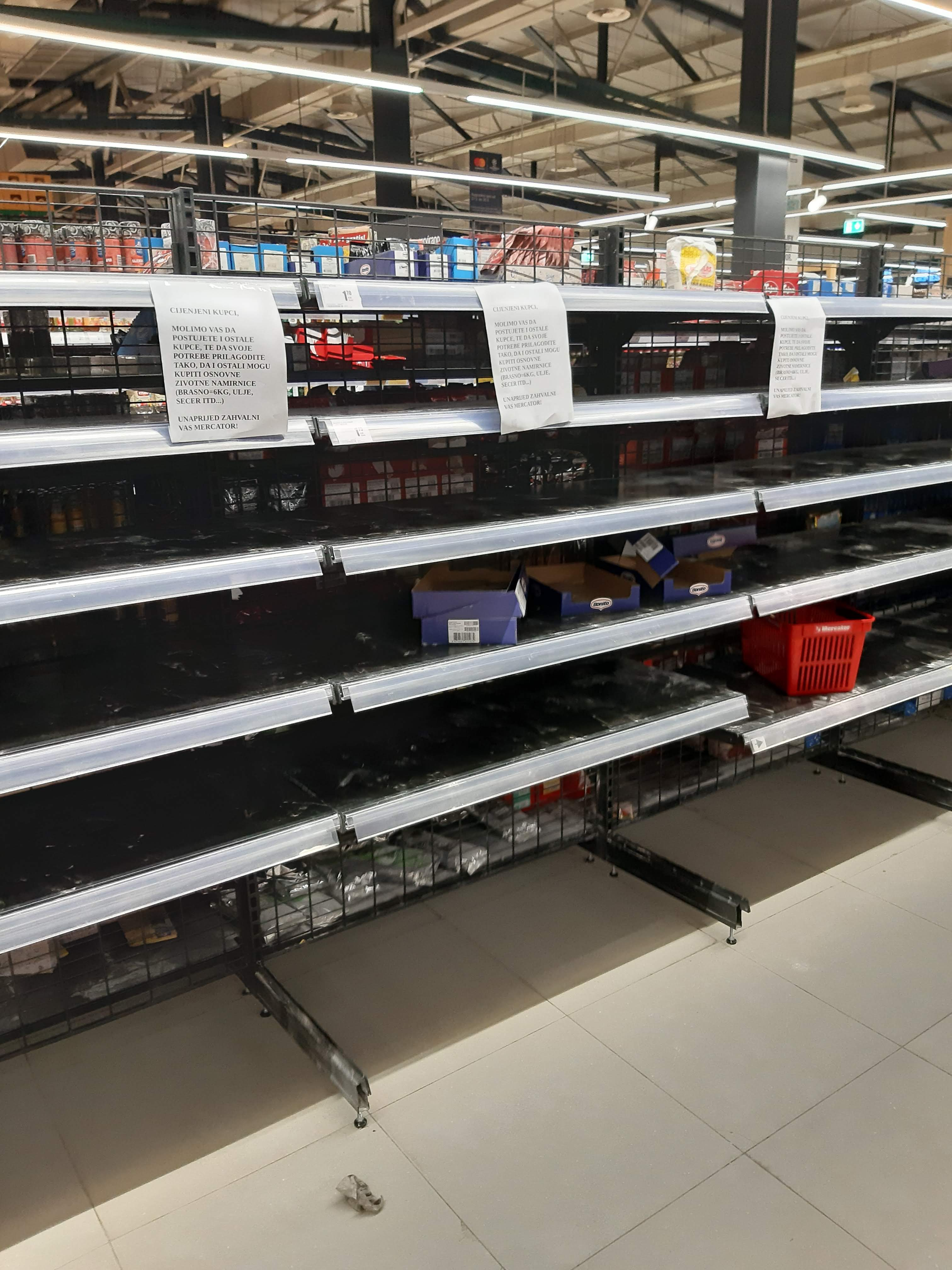
Empty shelves for flour in Mercator store in Sarajevo, as a result of panic buying

Members of the Board of the Tourism and Hospitality Group of the Foreign Trade Chamber of Bosnia and Herzegovina have warned that the situation in tourism as a sector was sensitive to global disruptions and the emergence of a new coronavirus strain could lead to the collapse of all entities operating in the tourism and hospitality sector.

Macroeconomic simulations in the report "COVID-19 Analysis Economic Consequences for Bosnia and Herzegovina, Measures and Solutions" by Admir Čavalić, Faruk Hadžić and Damir Bećirović show that BiH, ceteris paribus, will face a GDP decline in 2020 ranging from 3.97% to 9.53%. Worst-case scenario foresees by the end of the year the rise in the number of unemployed to 96,767. Applying measures indicated in the analysis in a timely manner, it would be possible to reduce this number to 33,284 unemployed. The analysis emphasizes current negative macroeconomic trends in BIH (instability of pension systems, economic slowdown to 2.8% in 2019, migratory trends with estimated 50,000 people leaving Bosnia annually) which makes the country very vulnerable to the current crisis. The strongest impact is expected in the healthcare and unemployment benefits sector. Specific financial burden pertains to government intervention aimed at stabilizing the economy. It is estimated that at least two billion KM (more than €1 billion) will be required for this purpose.

From 21 March, most of the sports activities were canceled across the entire country, including all football matches in all categories.

== International assistance ==
The countries and international organizations that have sent aid and funds to Bosnia and Herzegovina, to help fight the pandemic:

- Azerbaijan — On 23 April 2020, Azerbaijan sent to Bosnia and Herzegovina 10 tons protective and medical equipment, including 2 million protective masks.
- Croatia — The Government of Croatia allocated 43,000,000 HRK to the Hospital in Mostar.
- European Union — The European Union is considering two ways to assist Bosnia and Herzegovina, including quick support in provision of up to EUR 7 million worth of medical equipment and mid-term adjustment and enforcement of EU support in the amount of up to EUR 50 million for the economic development programmes.
- Hungary – On 16 April 2020, Hungary sent a plane with medical help, including respirators, to Banja Luka as a help to Republika Srpska, and truck with protective equipment to Sarajevo as a help to Federation of Bosnia and Herzegovina. Hungarian Foreign Minister Péter Szijjártó, who accompanied the shipment, met Bosnian Foreign Minister Bisera Turković in Sarajevo and was due to Milorad Dodik, Serbian member of the Bosnian state presidency, later on in Banja Luka.
- Malaysia — Government of Malaysia will send two million protective masks to Bosnia and Herzegovina. In addition, on 8 April 2021, Malaysia will also donate 50,000 doses of vaccines to Bosnia and Herzegovina.
- Qatar – On 19 May 2020, Qatari Airplane carrying an urgent medical aid shipment arrived to Sarajevo International Airport, to help tackle the outbreak of the Coronavirus in Bosnia and Herzegovina.
- Russia – On 9 April 2020, Russia sent three military planes as help to Republika Srpska. The help consisted in medical equipment, including protections masks and respirators, vehicles for disinfection, as well as in medical personnel.
- Serbia — Serbia is assisting Republika Srpska in medicines, protective equipment, and vital clinical machines, and also is assisting entire Bosnia and Herzegovina with food including wheat, corn and soybeans.
- Slovenia – On 16 April 2020 Slovenia sent humanitarian aid in total value of 133,000 Euro.
- Switzerland — On 23 March 2020, Embassy of Switzerland in Bosnia and Herzegovina informed Minister of Security that Switzerland has allocate US$200,000 for assistance to Bosnia and Herzegovina.
- Turkey — Turkey sent humanitarian aid on 24 March 2020 that include protective masks, gloves, protective suits and goggles to Red Cross Society of Bosnia and Herzegovina. Turkey also send 30,000 doses of COVID-19 vaccines on 28 March 2021.
- United Nations — The United Nations Development Programme in Bosnia and Herzegovina urgently financed procurement of 50,000 coronavirus test kits.
- United States — The US Government on 23 March 2020 donated medical materials and other important supplies to the Armed Forces of Bosnia and Herzegovina. USAID is donating $1.2 million to Bosnia and Herzegovina to help its laboratory systems, activate case-finding & monitoring, support experts, bolster awareness & community engagement and strengthen prevention.

== See also ==
- COVID-19 vaccination in Bosnia and Herzegovina
- COVID-19 pandemic in Europe
- COVID-19 pandemic by country and territory
