= Branko Blanuša =

Bosnian Serb professor and politician (born 1969)

- Бранко Блануша
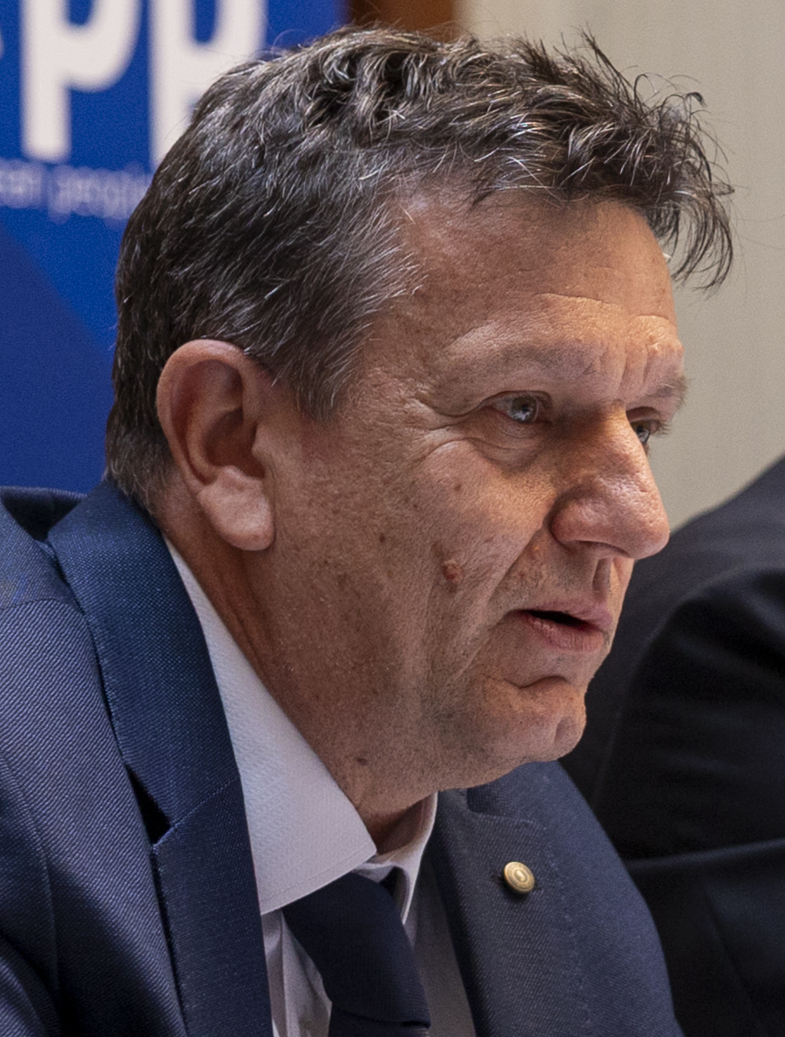
- Blanuša in 2026

President of the Serb Democratic Party
- In office 28 December 2025 – 22 November 2026
- Preceded by: Jovica Radulović (acting)
- Succeeded by: TBD

Personal details
- Born: 29 August 1969 (age 57) Banja Luka, SR Bosnia and Herzegovina, SFR Yugoslavia
- Party: Serb Democratic Party (2013–present)
- Spouse: Dijana Blanuša
- Children: 1
- Education: University of Niš (BS); University of Banja Luka (MS, PhD)

Branko Blanuša (Serbian Cyrillic: Бранко Блануша; born 29 August 1969) is a Bosnian Serb professor and politician who served as president of the Serb Democratic Party (SDS) between December 2025 and his resignation in November 2026. He is a professor at the University of Banja Luka's Faculty of Electrical Engineering, and was formerly its dean. He is also the chairman of the Institute of Electrical and Electronics Engineers for Bosnia and Herzegovina.

Born in Banja Luka in 1969, Blanuša graduated from the University of Niš. He subsequently earned his master's degree and PhD at the University of Banja Luka, and started lecturing at its Faculty of Electrical Engineering. A member of the SDS since 2013, Blanuša unsuccessfully ran for a seat in the national House of Representatives in the 2018 general election. In the 2025 Republika Srpska presidential election, he ran as the SDS candidate for president of Republika Srpska, but narrowly failed to get elected. However, due to electoral irregularities, repeated elections in 17 municipalities took place in February 2026, which he also lost. Following the November 2025 election, Blanuša was elected president of the SDS.

== Education and academic career ==
Blanuša was born on 29 August 1969 in Banja Luka, SFR Yugoslavia, present-day Bosnia and Herzegovina. After completing elementary and high school, he enrolled at the Faculty of Electrical Engineering of the University of Banja Luka. He graduated from the University of Niš's Faculty of Electronics, before earning a Master of Science degree and PhD at the University of Banja Luka.

Following his studies, Blanuša started to lecture at Banja Luka's Faculty of Electrical Engineering. He also worked as a professor of electronics at the University of East Sarajevo. Blanuša additionally served as dean of the University of Banja Luka's Faculty of Electrical Engineering from 2017 to 2021. He is a member of several editorial boards and a reviewer for international journals as well, including the European Physical Journal.

== Political career ==
Blanuša joined the Serb Democratic Party (SDS) in 2013, and is a member of the party's Banja Luka branch. He ran for a seat in the national House of Representatives in the 2018 general election, but was not elected. On 28 December 2025, Blanuša was unanimously elected president of the SDS.

=== 2025–26 Republika Srpska presidential election ===
Following the premature removal of then-president of Republika Srpska Milorad Dodik from the office of president by the Court of Bosnia and Herzegovina in June 2025, the Central Election Commission of Bosnia and Herzegovina announced in August that early presidential elections for a shortened, ten-month term, were to be held on 23 November 2025. On 28 September, the SDS announced Blanuša's candidacy for president. Initially refusing to take part in the election, Dodik and his party, the Alliance of Independent Social Democrats (SNSD) later confirmed their participation. Draško Stanivuković, the leader of the second largest opposition party, the Party of Democratic Progress (PDP), said his party would also boycott the election. However, by the end of October, Stanivuković and the PDP decided to support Blanuša.

In the election, SNSD member Siniša Karan was initially elected president by a surprisingly small margin, obtaining 50.39% of the vote. The virtually unknown Blanuša was second with 48.22%, and managed to win in his hometown Banja Luka, and Bijeljina, the two biggest cities in Republika Srpska, an entity of Bosnia and Herzegovina. Following the election, the opposition accused the ruling SNSD of voter fraud, and called for a recount of all ballots cast in the cities of Doboj, Zvornik and Laktaši. In December 2025, the Central Election Commission decided to annul the election results in 17 municipalities at 136 polling stations, with the elections set to be repeated at those locations on 8 February 2026.

The repeated elections were also won by Karan, whose total vote share was 50.53%, compared to Blanuša's 48.09%. Following the elections, he conceded and thanked his supporters.

== Personal life ==
Branko is married to Dijana Blanuša and has a daughter. Besides his native language, he also speaks English.

== Works ==
Blanuša has written several books and papers regarding electronics, including:

- Blanuša, Branko (2013). Energetski pretvarači u obnovljivim izvorima [Energy converters in renewable sources] (in Serbian). University of Banja Luka. ISBN 9789995546175.
- Blanuša, Branko (2015). Power Electronics – Converters and Regulators. Springer. ISBN 9783319094021.
- Blanuša, Branko (2018). Uvod u Elektroniku [Introduction to Electronics] (in Serbian). University of Banja Luka. ISBN 9789995546298.
