= Trivić =

Trivić is a surname. People with the surname include:

- Jelena Trivić, a Bosnian Serb politician and professor
- Dobrivoje Trivić, a Yugoslav and Serbian footballer
