= University Clinical Center of the Republika Srpska =

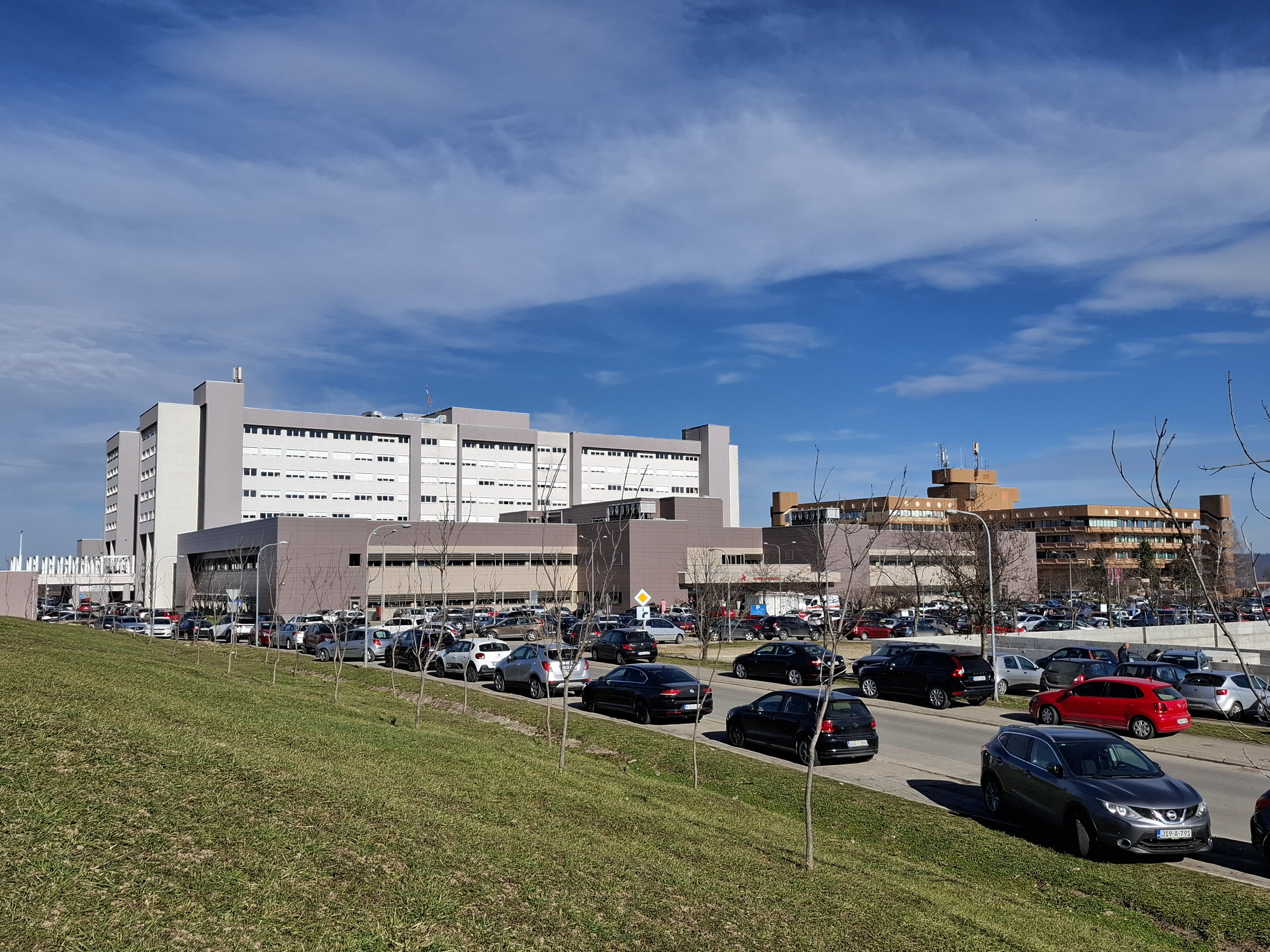
- View of the University Clinical Center of the Republika Srpska

Geography
- Location: Dvanaest beba bb, Banja Luka, Bosnia and Herzegovina
- Coordinates: 44°47′2.8716″N 17°10′44.3352″E

Organisation
- Type: Public; Academic Medical Center
- Affiliated university: University of Banja Luka

Services
- Emergency department: Yes
- Beds: 1,243 (2016)

Helipads
- Helipad: Yes

History
- Founded: 1897; 129 years ago

Links
- Website: www.kc-bl.com
- Lists: Hospitals in Bosnia and Herzegovina

The University Clinical Center of the Republika Srpska (Serbian: Универзитетски клинички центар Републике Српске, romanized: Univerzitetski klinički centar Republike Srpske) is a medical centre located in Banja Luka, Bosnia and Herzegovina. It serves as the main medical centre for both Banja Luka and Republika Srpska.

== History ==
The University Clinical Center of the Republika Srpska was established in 1897. In August 2015, by the government decision its name was changed to University Clinical Center of the Republika Srpska. It is the largest hospital in Republika Srpska, an entity of Bosnia and Herzegovina. As of 2016, the Clinical Center has 1,243 available beds.

== Gallery ==
Maternity building

Infectious diseases building

== See also ==
- List of hospitals in Bosnia and Herzegovina
