= COVID-19 vaccination in Bosnia and Herzegovina =

Immunisation against COVID-19

- Date: 12 February 2021 – present
- Location: Bosnia and Herzegovina
- Cause: COVID-19 pandemic
- Target: Full immunisation of adults in Bosnia and Herzegovina against COVID-19
- Participants: 943,394 have received one vaccine dose 846,080 have received two vaccine doses 135,476 have received three vaccine doses
- Outcome: 28.9% of the total Bosnia and Herzegovina population have received one vaccine dose 25.9% of the total Bosnia and Herzegovina population have received two vaccine doses 4.2% of the total Bosnia and Herzegovina population have received three vaccine doses

The COVID-19 vaccination campaign in Bosnia and Herzegovina is a mass immunization campaign that was put in place by the Bosnian authorities in order to respond to the ongoing COVID-19 pandemic. It started on 12 February 2021.

As of 29 January 2022, 943,394 people have received the first dose, 846,080 people have received the second dose and 135,476 people have received the third dose.

== Vaccines on order ==
Five types of COVID-19 vaccines are currently being used in Bosnia and Herzegovina. As of 25 January 2022, 3,948,830 vaccine doses have arrived in the country.

Vaccine	Doses arrived	Approval	Deployment
Sinopharm BIBP	1.09 million	Yes	Yes
Oxford-AstraZeneca	1.05 million	Yes	Yes
Pfizer–BioNTech	284,310	Yes	Yes
Sputnik V	199,300	Yes	Yes
CoronaVac	90,000	Yes	Yes

== See also ==
- COVID-19 pandemic in Bosnia and Herzegovina
- Deployment of COVID-19 vaccines
