= Mladen Ivanić =

Bosnian Serb politician (born 1958)

- Младен Иванић
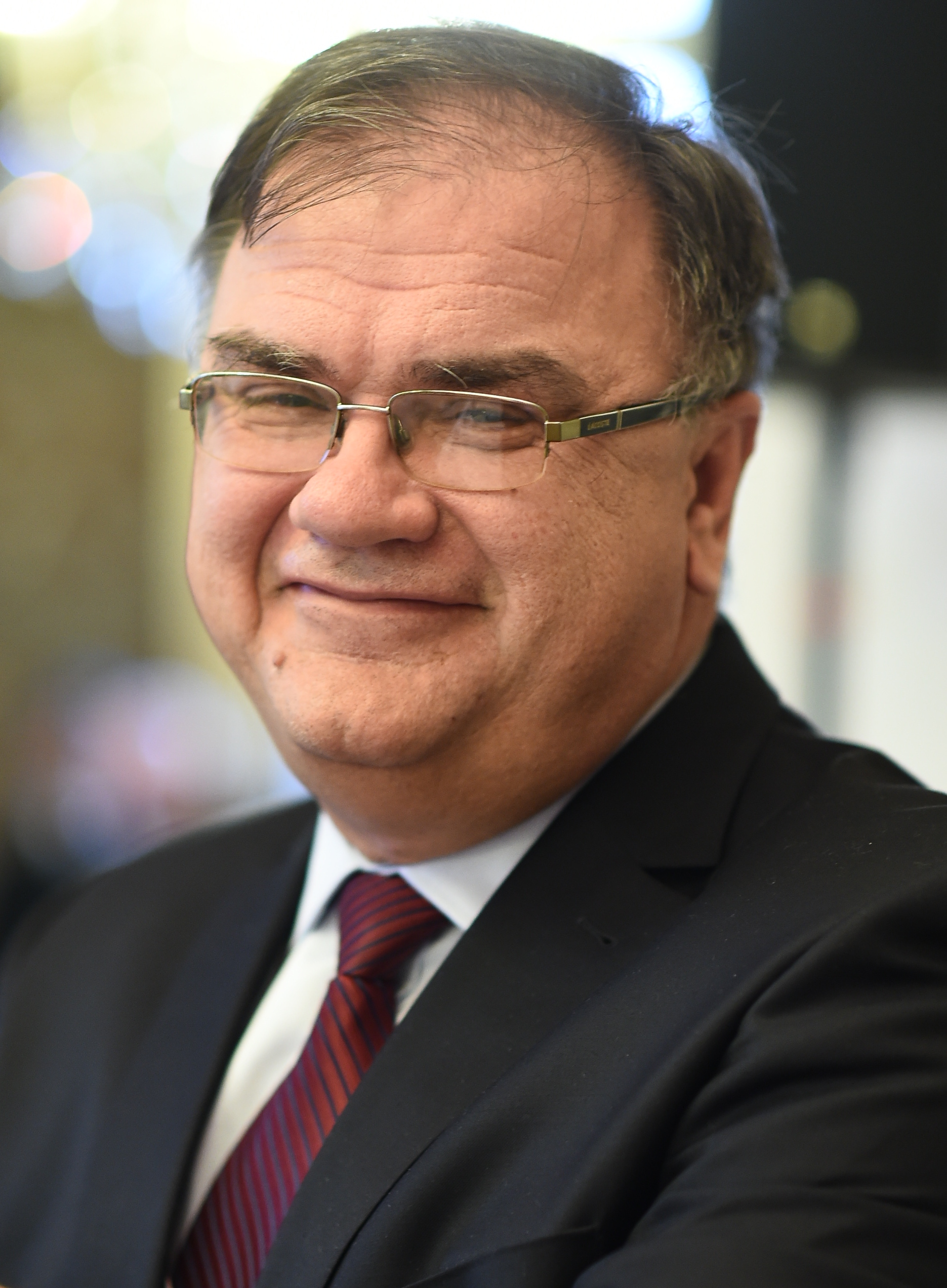
- Formal portrait, 2014

Serb member of the Presidency of Bosnia and Herzegovina
- In office 17 November 2014 – 20 November 2018 (Note: Serving as the Chairman of the Presidency from 17 November 2014 to 17 July 2015, and from 17 November 2016 to 17 July 2017.)
- Prime Minister: Vjekoslav Bevanda; Denis Zvizdić
- Preceded by: Nebojša Radmanović
- Succeeded by: Milorad Dodik

Minister of Foreign Affairs
- In office 23 December 2002 – 11 January 2007
- Prime Minister: Adnan Terzić
- Preceded by: Zlatko Lagumdžija
- Succeeded by: Sven Alkalaj

Prime Minister of Republika Srpska
- In office 16 January 2001 – 17 January 2003
- President: Mirko Šarović; Dragan Čavić
- Preceded by: Milorad Dodik
- Succeeded by: Dragan Mikerević
Parliamentary offices
Member of the House of Peoples
In office
14 March 2007 – 17 November 2014
Additional positions
President of the Party of Democratic Progress
In office 26 September 1999 – 28 November 2015
| Preceded by | Office established |
| Succeeded by | Branislav Borenović |

Personal details
- Born: 16 September 1958 (age 68) Sanski Most, PR Bosnia and Herzegovina, FPR Yugoslavia
- Party: Party of Democratic Progress (1999–present)
- Other political affiliations: SKJ (until 1991)
- Spouse: Gordana Ivanić
- Children: 2
- Education: University of Banja Luka (BEc); University of Belgrade (MEc, PhD)

Mladen Ivanić (Serbian Cyrillic: Младен Иванић, pronounced [mlâden ǐʋanit͡ɕ]; born 16 September 1958) is a Bosnian Serb politician who served as the Serb member of the Presidency of Bosnia and Herzegovina from 2014 to 2018. He is the founder, member and former president of the Party of Democratic Progress.

Ivanić served as minister of foreign affairs from 2002 to 2007. He was also Prime Minister of Republika Srpska from 2001 to 2003. Ivanić served as member of the national House of Peoples from 2007 to 2014 as well.

== Early life and education ==
Born in Sanski Most, Ivanić has lived in Banja Luka since 1971, when he earned his university diploma in economics in 1981. He then received a doctorate from the University of Belgrade in economics. His thesis was titled Contemporary Marxist political economy in the West. He undertook post-Doctoral studies at the University of Mannheim and the University of Glasgow. Upon completion of his studies, he worked as a journalist. From 1985 to 1988, he lectured in Political economy at the Faculty of Economics in Banja Luka, and later also in Sarajevo.

== Early political career ==
Ivanić's political career began in 1988, when he became a member of the Presidency of SR Bosnia and Herzegovina during Yugoslav Socialist times.

From 2001 until 2003, he was Prime Minister of Republika Srpska, one of Bosnia and Herzegovina's two entities. He also served as minister of foreign affairs, succeeding Zlatko Lagumdžija on the post, and as such was a member of the Council of Ministers of Bosnia and Herzegovina (i.e. the national government). In turn, he was succeeded on the post in 2007 by Sven Alkalaj. Ivanić is a founding member of the center-right Bosnian Serb Party of Democratic Progress (PDP) and was its president from 1999 to 2015.

== Presidency (2014–2018) ==
=== 2014 general election ===
The Alliance for Change, a coalition formed around the Serb Democratic Party and Ivanić's PDP, amongst some other parties as well, announced on 14 July 2014 that Ivanić would run in the Bosnian general election as a candidate for Bosnia and Herzegovina's three-person Presidency member, representing the Serbs.

At the general election, held on 12 October 2014, Ivanić was elected to the Presidency, having obtained 48.71% of the vote, narrowly beating the Alliance of Independent Social Democrats' (SNSD) candidate, the Republika Srpska prime minister Željka Cvijanović, who obtained 47.56% of the vote. His victory marked the first time since the Dayton Agreement that a Serb member of the Presidency received the highest number of votes in the country, out of the three elected members. He was then Chairman of the Presidency from November 2014 to July 2015 and again from November 2016 to July 2017.

=== 2018 general election ===
At the 2018 general election, held on 7 October, Ivanić lost his bid for re-election to the Bosnian Presidency to SNSD's leader and Republika Srpska president Milorad Dodik. Dodik obtained 53.88% of the vote, while Ivanić was second with 42.74%.

=== Domestic policy ===
==== Attitudes towards the Republika Srpska referendum ====
A referendum on the National Day of Republika Srpska, called the "Day of Republika Srpska" was held on 25 September 2016. A year prior, the Constitutional Court of Bosnia and Herzegovina ruled against the constitutionality of the holiday, deeming it discriminatory against non-Serbs in the entity. Republika Srpska authorities reacted by contesting the decision of the Constitutional Court and calling for constitutional amendments within 120 days to get rid of international judges serving in the Court, simultaneously calling for a popular referendum on whether Republika Srpska citizens support the decision of the Court. On 9 January 2016, the entity's authorities celebrated the "unconstitutional" holiday, in spite of the Court ruling.

About the National Day referendum announced by Milorad Dodik regarding the legislation of Bosnia and Herzegovina, Ivanić stated:

I believe that Republika Srpska has the right to a referendum, that is the first and very important thing. Secondly, I think that the judiciary in Bosnia and Herzegovina is not good, that it was under huge political influence and that objectively that influence was expressed by international representatives. I think that the judiciary was a mechanism of political action of international representatives in Bosnia and that it did not prove to be good at all. But, I am not in favor of organizing the referendum at this moment. I don't think the referendum will produce a solution. We know the results of the referendum. If it happens, over 90% of the citizens of Republika Srpska will say that they do not accept the imposed decisions of the High Representatives, that is the question, and especially not the decision on the formation of the court and the prosecutor's office. My key question is: What happens the day after? Since the government did not say what follows after that, because it does not have any concept and vision of what the next steps are, I cannot be the one to promote the referendum.

The National Assembly of Republika Srpska passed a resolution on the referendum on 15 July 2016, with the backing of all Serb parties and the boycott of National Assembly members ethnicly Bosniak. The result of the referendum was 99.8% in favour of supporting the National Day.

=== Foreign policy ===
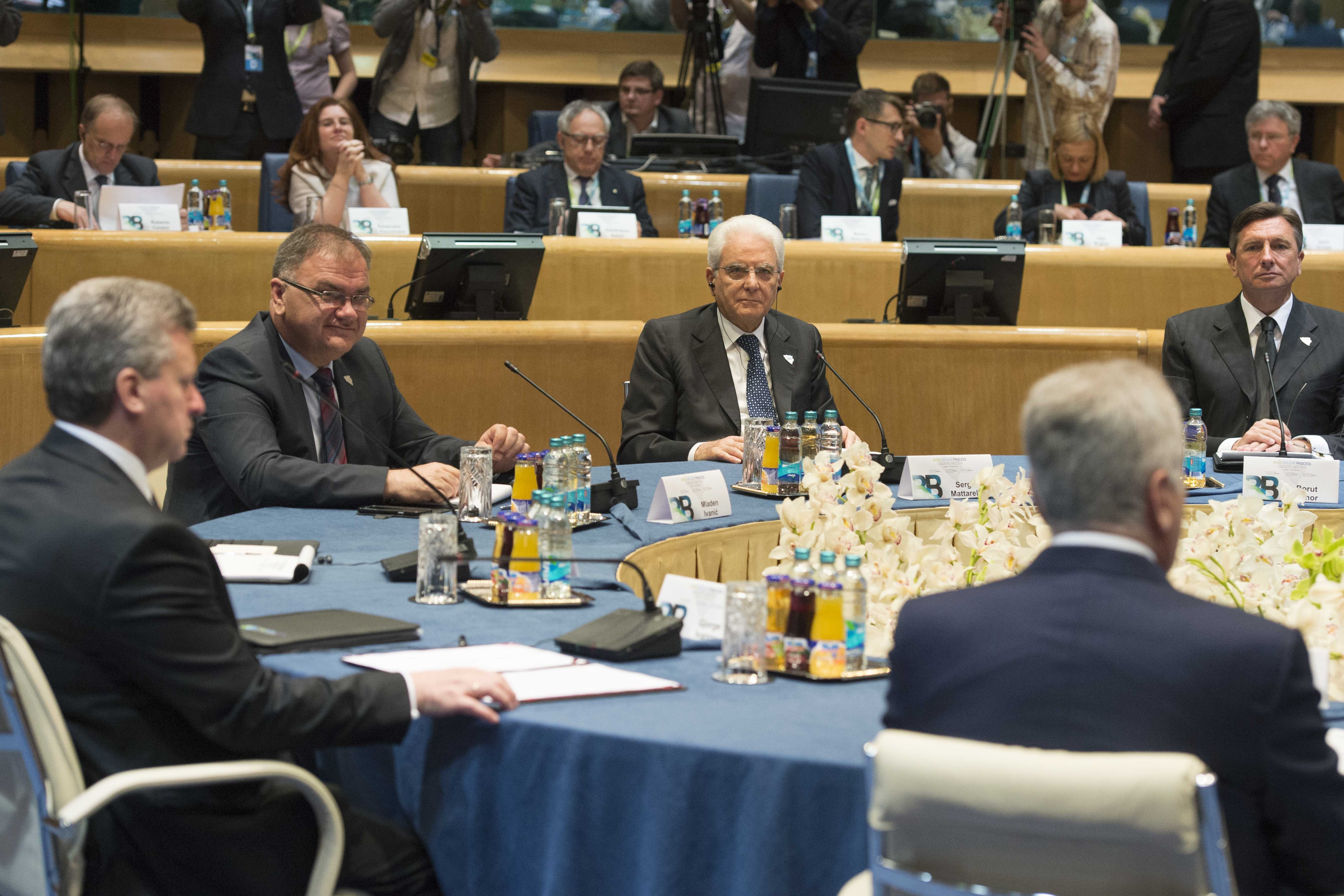
Ivanić alongside Italian president Sergio Mattarella and fellow Western Balkans leaders at the Brdo-Brijuni Process summit in Sarajevo, 29 May 2016

On 7 June 2015, Ivanić met with Pope Francis in Sarajevo, as part of the Popes's 2015 papal visit to Bosnia and Herzegovina.

In March 2017, he visited Jerusalem and met with Israeli prime minister Benjamin Netanyahu. While in Jerusalem, Ivanić talked about the Jewish community in Bosnia and Herzegovina, saying that "the community should not expect property expropriated during the Holocaust in Bosnia to be given back or to be compensated for its seizure. A restitution law had at one time been created in Bosnia, but fell by the wayside because the process would be too complicated. The seized properties were taken over by the Yugoslav Communists after the war, then privatised, while some of them have been demolished or replaced." Ivanić further insisted that he would restore the property or give compensation if he could, but that the matter was not in his hands.

==== European Union ====
Ivanić advocated Bosnia and Herzegovina's accession to the European Union. In an interview with web portal European Western Balkans in January 2016, he stated that "by joining the EU, Bosnia and Herzegovina would receive rules that were developed by a third party, and thus internal differences would become less important. It is also a good economic space." Ivanić mentioned the slowness of the Bosnian authorities in making decisions as possible difficulties that the country could face, and pointed out that this is why reform in Bosnia and Herzegovina is needed.

== Personal life ==
Mladen is married to Gordana Ivanić, and together they have two children. They live in Banja Luka.

He is fluent in English.

== Notes ==
Political offices
| Preceded by Milorad Dodik | Prime Minister of Republika Srpska; 2001–2003 | Succeeded by Dragan Mikerević |
| Preceded by Zlatko Lagumdžija | Minister of Foreign Affairs; 2002–2007 | Succeeded by Sven Alkalaj |
| Preceded by Nebojša Radmanović | Serb member of the Presidency of Bosnia and Herzegovina; 2014–2018 | Succeeded by Milorad Dodik |
| Preceded by Bakir Izetbegović | Chairman of the Presidency of Bosnia and Herzegovina; 2014–2015 | Succeeded by Dragan Čović |
| Preceded by Bakir Izetbegović | Chairman of the Presidency of Bosnia and Herzegovina; 2016–2017 | Succeeded by Dragan Čović |
