= Jelena Trivić =

Bosnian Serb politician and professor (born 1983)

- Јелена Тривић
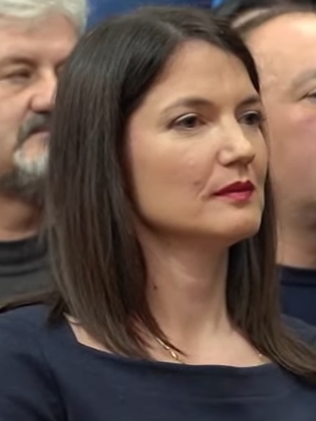
- Trivić in 2021

Member of the National Assembly of Republika Srpska
- In office 19 November 2018 – 15 November 2022

Personal details
- Born: 8 August 1983 (age 43) Banja Luka, SR Bosnia and Herzegovina, SFR Yugoslavia
- Party: People's Front (2023–present)
- Other political affiliations: Party of Democratic Progress (until 2023)
- Spouse: Dejan Trivić
- Children: 2
- Education: University of Banja Luka (BEc); University of Bologna (MEc); University of Belgrade (PhD)
- Occupation: Politician, professor

Jelena Trivić (Serbian Cyrillic: Јелена Тривић; born 8 August 1983) is a Bosnian Serb politician and professor who served as member of the National Assembly of Republika Srpska from 2018 to 2022. She was vice president of the Party of Democratic Progress, until she left it in 2023 to establish the People's Front.

Trivić has gained attention for espousing anti-Croat sentiment and for historical revisionism after denying Chetnik war crimes in World War II and the Srebrenica genocide.

== Early life and education ==
Trivić was born on 8 August 1983 in Banja Luka, SR Bosnia and Herzegovina, SFR Yugoslavia. She graduated at the Faculty of Economics, University of Banja Luka in 2006, obtained her master's degree from the University of Bologna in 2007 and gained her doctorate from the Faculty of Economics, University of Belgrade in 2013.

Trivić is an associate professor at the Faculty of Economics, University of Banja Luka.

== Political career ==
Trivić publicly supported the group "Justice for David" in the fight for the truth about the death of David Dragičević and strongly condemned the reactions of the Ministry of Internal Affairs of Republika Srpska who arrested the peaceful protestors in Krajina Square, including Dragičević's parents.

Trivić was elected member of the National Assembly of Republika Srpska following the 2018 general election as a candidate of the Party of Democratic Progress (PDP). She was a member of the Parliamentary Committee for Trade and Tourism and the Committee for Finance and Budget.

Trivić was the joint candidate of the PDP and the Serb Democratic Party for president of Republika Srpska in the 2022 general election. On election night, she claimed victory despite preliminary data from the Central Election Commission of Bosnia and Herzegovina showing that incumbent Milorad Dodik won with 48% of the vote and around 30,000 more votes than Trivić, alleging voter fraud. After Trivić and Republika Srpska's opposition parties demanded a recount, Dodik's victory was confirmed by election officials weeks later, though Trivić still refused to concede.

In March 2023, Trivić left the PDP and established her own political party, the People's Front.

== Political positions ==
Trivić is a critic of Milorad Dodik and his ruling Alliance of Independent Social Democrats (SNSD), claiming that Dodik is an "agent of Croatian interests", that he "cannot be trusted" and that "corruption, crime, economic disaster and the SNSD will destroy Republika Srpska."

Trivić has espoused anti-Croat sentiment on several occasions. She has also complained about the usage of the Croatian-language term in an official document of the National Assembly of Republika Srpska, calling it "disgraceful". She also claimed that the leading Croat party in Bosnia and Herzegovina, the Croatian Democratic Union, aims for the abolishment of Republika Srpska and stated that she doesn't "care about the interests of Croats."

Trivić has claimed that the Chetniks did not commit any mass war crimes during World War II. In July 2021, regarding the Srebrenica genocide, Trivić stated that the "crime that happened in Srebrenica is not genocide, these are facts" and that "Serbs are not people who kneel before the occupier."

== Personal life ==
Jelena is married to Dejan Trivić and has two sons. She also holds Serbian citizenship. Besides her native Serbian, Trivić also speaks English and Italian.
