= Tanja Stupar-Trifunović =

Author from Bosnia and Herzegovina (born 1977)

- Born: 1977 (age 48–49); Zadar, Croatia
- Education: University of Banja Luka
- Occupation: Poet
- Writing career
- Language: Serbian
- Notable awards: European Union Prize for Literature (2016)

Tanja Stupar-Trifunović (born 1977) is an author from Bosnia and Herzegovina.

== Background ==
Stupar-Trifunović was born in 1977 in Zadar, Croatia. She left Zadar with her family at the beginning of the Yugoslav wars. She attended Serbian language and literature at the University of Banja Luka and currently lives in Banja Luka.

== Works ==
Stupar-Trifunović's writing often explores loss and the lives of women, specifically in the context of the Yugoslav wars.

Primarily a poet, Stupar-Trifunović has also published a novel, as well as short stories, columns and literary reviews. Her first novel, Satovi u majčinoj sobi (Clocks in my mother’s room), was published in 2014.

Poetry and short story collections published by Stupar-Trifunović include:

- Kuća od slova (1999, Zadužbina, “Petar Kočić” Banja Luka)
- Uspostavljanje ravnoteže (2002, KOV)
- Adornova svraka (2007, Zalihica)
- O čemu misle varvari dok doručkuju (2008, Zoro), poetry, title translates to What Barbarians Are Thinking about While Having Breakfast
- Glavni junak je čovjek koji se zaljubljuje u nesreću (2010, Zaklada Fra Grgo Martić), poetry, title translates to The Hero is the Man Who Falls in Love with Calamity

Poetry by Stupar-Trifunović has been translated into several languages including English, German, Polish, French, Macedonian, Romanian, Slovene and Danish. In 2017, she signed the Declaration on the Common Language of the Croats, Serbs, Bosniaks and Montenegrins.

Stupar-Trifunović currently works as Editor for the literary magazine Putevi and is developing her second novel.

== Awards ==
In 2016, Stupar-Trifunović won the European Union Prize for Literature for her novel Satovi u majčinoj sobi (Clocks in my mother’s room). The novel was also short listed for the 2014 NIN Award (considered the leading Serbian literary prize). In 2013 it won the Zlatna sova third-place award for the best novel manuscript in Serbian language.

In 2008, Stupar-Trifunović was shortlisted in the poetry category of the CEE Literature Award.

Her poetry collection, O čemu misle varvari dok doručkuju, was shortlisted for the ProCredit Bank Literature Award for East and Southeast Europe.

In 2009 Glavni junak je čovjek koji se zaljubljuje u nesreću won the Fra Grgo Martić Literary Award.

=== Residencies ===
In January 2017, Stupar-Trifunović began an artists-in-residence programme at the Q21 in Vienna.
