= Dragan Mikerević =

Chairman of the Council of Ministers of Bosnia and Herzegovina in 2002

- Драган Микеревић

Prime Minister of Republika Srpska
- In office 17 January 2003 – 17 February 2005
- President: Dragan Čavić
- Preceded by: Mladen Ivanić
- Succeeded by: Pero Bukejlović

Chairman of the Council of Ministers of Bosnia and Herzegovina
- In office 15 March 2002 – 23 December 2002
- President: See list: Beriz Belkić Sulejman Tihić Živko Radišić Mirko Šarović Jozo Križanović Dragan Čović
- Preceded by: Zlatko Lagumdžija
- Succeeded by: Adnan Terzić
Ministerial offices
Minister for European Integration
In office 22 February 2001 – 23 December 2002
Prime Minister	Božidar Matić; Zlatko Lagumdžija; Himself
Preceded by	Bisera Turković
Succeeded by	Office abolished

Personal details
- Born: 12 February 1955 (age 71) Doboj, PR Bosnia and Herzegovina, FPR Yugoslavia
- Party: Party of Democratic Progress (1999–2009)
- Spouse: Vojka Mikerević
- Children: 2
- Education: University of Novi Sad

Dragan Mikerević (Serbian Cyrillic: Драган Микеревић; born 12 February 1955) is a Bosnian Serb politician who served as Prime Minister of Republika Srpska from 2003 to 2005. Previously, he served as Chairman of the Council of Ministers of Bosnia and Herzegovina from March to December 2002.

== Early life and education ==
Born on 12 February 1955 in Doboj, PR Bosnia and Herzegovina, FPR Yugoslavia, Mikerević earned a PhD in Economics from the University of Novi Sad in 1996, where he was employed as a professor.

== Political career ==
A member of the Party of Democratic Progress since 1999, Mikerević was appointed Prime Minister of Republika Srpska on 17 January 2003. He announced his resignation in December 2004, one day after the High Representative for Bosnia and Herzegovina fired six Bosnian Serb policemen, alleging they were protecting war crimes fugitives. He officially served as prime minister until 17 February 2005. Mikerević was also minister for European Integration in the Council of Ministers of Bosnia and Herzegovina from February 2001 to December 2002. He simultaneously served Chairman of the Council of Ministers between March and December 2002.

Mikerević was a member of the Party of Democratic Progress until 2009.

== Personal life ==
Dragan is married to Vojka Mikerević and together they have two children.

Political offices
Preceded by Dragan Čavić	Prime Minister of Republika Srpska; 2003–2005	Succeeded by Mladen Ivanić
Preceded by Zlatko Lagumdžija	Chairman of the Council of Ministers of Bosnia and Herzegovina; 2002	Succeeded by Adnan Terzić
