= List of hospitals in Bosnia and Herzegovina =

The following is a list of currently operating public hospitals in Bosnia and Herzegovina.

== Federation of Bosnia and Herzegovina ==
=== Clinical hospitals ===
- Clinical Center University of Sarajevo, Sarajevo
  - Gynecology and Obstetrics Clinic of the Clinical Center University of Sarajevo (Jezero Maternity Hospital)
- University Clinical Hospital Mostar, Mostar
- University Clinical Center of Tuzla, Tuzla

=== County hospitals ===
- Dr. Irfan Ljubijankić Hospital, Bihać
- Dr. Abdulah Nakaš General Hospital, Sarajevo
- Fra Mato Nikolić Hospital, Nova Bila
- Fra Mihovil Sučić Hospital, Livno
- Goražde County Hospital, Goražde
- Jajce Hospital, Jajce
- Orašje County Hospital, Orašje
- Dr. Safet Mujić Hospital, Mostar
- Tešanj General Hospital, Tešanj
- Travnik County Hospital, Travnik
- Zenica County Hospital, Zenica
- General Hospital Dr. Mustafa Beganović Gračanica, Gračanica
- General Hospital Konjic, Konjic

== Republika Srpska ==
=== Clinical hospitals ===
- University Clinical Center of the Republika Srpska, Banja Luka
- University Hospital Foča, Foča

=== General hospitals ===
- General Hospital "Saints Cosmas and Damian" Bijeljina, Bijeljina
- General Hospital "St. Luke the Evangelist" Doboj, Doboj
- General Hospital Gradiška, Gradiška
- General Hospital Istočno Sarajevo, Istočno Sarajevo
- General Hospital Nevesinje, Nevesinje
- General Hospital Prijedor, Prijedor
- General Hospital Trebinje, Trebinje
- General Hospital Zvornik, Zvornik
