= Fra Mihovil Sučić Hospital =

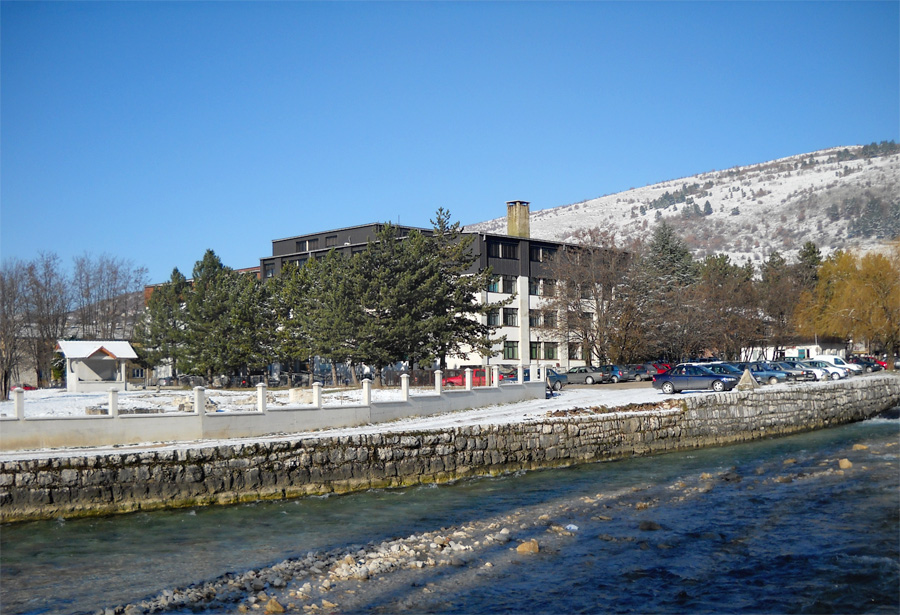

- Location within Bosnia and Herzegovina

Geography
- Location: Livno, Canton of Herzeg-Bosnia, Bosnia and Herzegovina
- Coordinates: 43.826859°N 17.002507°E

Organisation
- Type: District General

Services
- Emergency department: Yes

History
- Founded: 1893

Links
- Website: www.bolnica-livno.com
- Lists: Hospitals in Bosnia and Herzegovina

Fra Mihovil Sučić Hospital (Croatian: Županijska bolnica "Fra Mihovil Sučić") is the largest and central hospital of Canton of Herzeg-Bosnia in Bosnia and Herzegovina. It provides district general hospital services for the canton.

== History ==
During the Austro-Hungarian rule in Livno, construction of the county hospital began in 1892. Construction was completed in 1893 when the hospital was opened and Philip Hansel was appointed as the first director. Newly built provincial hospital was opened in 1939. Medical Center Livno was established in 1975 and in 1991 it was named Fra Mihovil Sučić. Within the Medical center were the community health centers in Glamoč and Duvno. The Center was abolished in 1994 when General hospital Livno was founded. General Hospital received the status of the county hospital in 1998.
