= Party of Democratic Progress =

Bosnian Serb political party

Party of Democratic Progress Партија демократског прогреса Partija demokratskog progresa
- Abbreviation: PDP (ПДП)
- President: Draško Stanivuković
- Founder: Mladen Ivanić
- Founded: 26 September 1999; 27 years ago
- Headquarters: Prvog krajiškog korpusa 130, Banja Luka
- Ideology: Moderate conservatism; Serb ethnic interests; Economic liberalism; Pro-Europeanism
- Political position: Centre to centre-right
- European affiliation: European People's Party (observer)
- International affiliation: International Democracy Union
- Colours: Blue
- HoP BiH: 1 / 15
- HoR BiH: 2 / 42
- HoP FBiH: 0 / 80
- HoR FBiH: 0 / 98
- NA RS: 7 / 83
- Mayors: 2 / 145

Website
- www.pdp.rs.ba

The Party of Democratic Progress (Serbian: Партија демократског прогреса, ПДП, romanized: Partija demokratskog progresa, PDP) is a centre to centre-right Serb political party in Bosnia and Herzegovina founded on 26 September 1999. It has been part of the Safe Srpska Movement since 2025.

== History ==
The PDP was established in Banja Luka on 26 September 1999. During the founding assembly, Mladen Ivanić was elected as the president of the party, while Branko Dokić and Zoran Đerić were elected as vice presidents. On 28 November 2015, Ivanić left the position of president after 16 years, after which Branislav Borenović became the new president of the PDP. On 15 December 2024, Draško Stanivuković replaced Borenović as the new president of the party.

== International Cooperation ==
The party is an observer member of the European People's Party (EPP) and International Democracy Union (IDU).

In terms of bilateral cooperation with other European parties, the PDP maintains strong links with the Conservative Party (UK), Moderate Party (Sweden), Christian Democratic Union (Germany), SDKU (Slovakia), Austrian People's Party, New Democracy (Greece) and Democratic Party of Serbia from Serbia.

The PDP also has good relations with Konrad Adenauer Foundation, Robert Schuman Institute and Democrat Youth Community of Europe.

== List of presidents ==
#	Name (Born–Died)	Portrait	Term of Office	
1	Mladen Ivanić (b. 1958)		26 September 1999	28 November 2015
2	Branislav Borenović (b. 1974)		28 November 2015	15 December 2024
3	Draško Stanivuković (b. 1993)		15 December 2024	present

== Election results ==
=== Parliamentary Assembly of Bosnia and Herzegovina ===
Parliamentary Assembly of Bosnia and Herzegovina
Year	Leader	Popular vote	%	HoR	Seat change	HoP	Seat change	Government
2000	Mladen Ivanić	95,245	6.39	2 / 42	New	1 / 15	New	Coalition
2002	Mladen Ivanić	56,643	4.61	2 / 42	0	2 / 15	▲1	Coalition
2006	Mladen Ivanić	28,410	2.01	1 / 42	▼1	1 / 15	▼1	Opposition
2010	Mladen Ivanić	40,070	2.44	1 / 42	0	1 / 15	0	Opposition
2014	Mladen Ivanić	50,516	3.10	1 / 42	0	0 / 15	▼1	Coalition
2018	Branislav Borenović	83,832	5.06	2 / 42	▲1	0 / 15	0	Opposition
2022	Branislav Borenović	73,489	4.63	2 / 42	0	0 / 15	0	Opposition
2026 (Note: Run within the Safe Srpska Movement coalition, which won 2 seats; 1 to PDP, and 1 to NPSP.)	Draško Stanivuković	81,851	6.05	1 / 42	▼1			TBA

=== National Assembly of Republika Srpska ===
National Assembly of Republika Srpska
Year	Leader	Popular vote	% of popular vote	# of seats	Seat change	Government
2000	Mladen Ivanić	76,810	12.3%	11 / 83	New	Coalition
2002	Mladen Ivanić	54,756	10.7%	9 / 83	▼2	Coalition
2006	Mladen Ivanić	38,681	6.86%	8 / 83	▼1	Opposition
2010	Mladen Ivanić	47,806	7.55%	7 / 83	▼1	Opposition
2014	Mladen Ivanić	48,845	7.38%	7 / 83	0	Opposition
2018	Branislav Borenović	69,948	10.22%	9 / 83	▲2	Opposition
2022	Branislav Borenović	65,872	10.30%	8 / 83	▼1	Opposition

=== Presidential elections ===
Presidency of Bosnia and Herzegovina
Election year	#	Candidate	Votes	%	Note	Elected?
2002	5th	Branko Dokić	41,667	35.9%	—	No
2006	▲2nd	Mladen Bosić	130,824	24.2%	Support	No
2010	2nd	Mladen Ivanić	285,951	47.31%	—	No
2014	▲1st	Mladen Ivanić	318,196	48.71%	—	Yes
2018	▼2nd	Mladen Ivanić	292,065	42.74%	—	No
2022	2nd	Mirko Šarović	224,912	35.45%	Support	No

President of Republika Srpska
Election year	#	Candidate	Votes	%	Note	Elected?
2000	3rd	Momčilo Tepić	54,392	8.64%	—	No
2002	3rd	Dragan Mikerević	39,978	7.83%	—	No
2006	▼4th	Slobodan Nagradić	19,623	3.54%	—	No
2007	▲3rd	Mladen Ivanić	69,522	16.91%	—	No
2010	▲2nd	Ognjen Tadić	227,239	35.92%	Support	No
2014	2nd	Ognjen Tadić	296,021	44.28%	Support	No
2018	2nd	Vukota Govedarica	284,140	41.81%	Support	No
2022	2nd	Jelena Trivić	273,245	42.84%	—	No
2025	2nd	Branko Blanuša	212,605	48.22%	Support	No

== Positions held ==
Major positions held by Party of Democratic Progress members:

Member of the Presidency of Bosnia and Herzegovina	Years
Mladen Ivanić	2014–2018
Chairman of the Council of Ministers of Bosnia and Herzegovina	Years
Dragan Mikerević	2002
Prime Minister of Republika Srpska	Years
Mladen Ivanić	2001–2003
Dragan Mikerević	2003–2005
