= Branislav Borenović =

Bosnian Serb politician (born 1974)

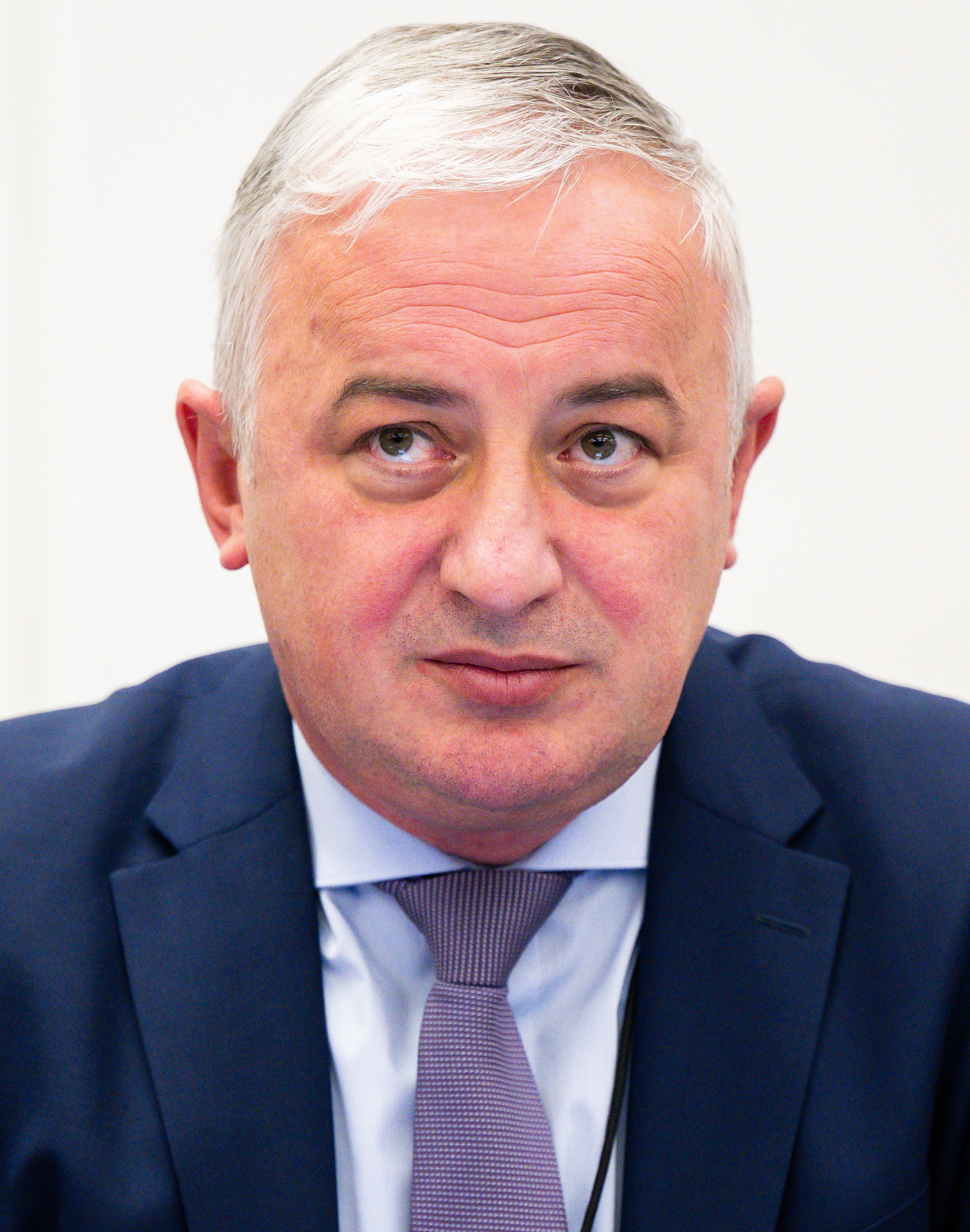
- Borenović in 2025

Member of the House of Representatives
- Incumbent
- Assumed office 6 December 2018
- Constituency: 1st Electoral Unit of RS
Ministerial offices
Minister of Family, Youth and Sports of Republika Srpska
In office 28 February 2006 – 30 November 2006
Prime Minister	Milorad Dodik
Preceded by	Office established
Succeeded by	Proko Dragosavljević
Parliamentary offices
Member of the National Assembly of Republika Srpska
In office
9 November 2006 – 19 November 2018
Additional positions
President of the Party of Democratic Progress
In office 28 November 2015 – 15 December 2024
Preceded by	Mladen Ivanić
Succeeded by	Draško Stanivuković

Personal details
- Born: 4 March 1974 (age 52) Sanski Most, SR Bosnia and Herzegovina, SFR Yugoslavia
- Party: Party of Democratic Progress (1999–present)
- Spouse: Biljana Borenović (m. 1998)
- Children: 3
- Education: University of Banja Luka (BEc)

Branislav Borenović (Serbian Cyrillic: Бранислав Бореновић; born 4 March 1974) is a Bosnian Serb politician serving as member of the national House of Representatives since 2018. He previously served as member of the National Assembly of Republika Srpska from 2006 to 2018.

Borenović was born in Sanski Most in 1974. He holds a degree in economics from the University of Banja Luka. A member of the Party of Democratic Progress (PDP), Borenović served as the first Minister of Family, Youth and Sports of Republika Srpska from February to November 2006. He was elected to the National Assembly of Republika Srpska in the 2006 general election, and was re-elected two more times before becoming a member of the House of Representatives.

Borenović has been a member of the PDP since its formation in 1999, and was its president from 2015 to 2024.

== Early life and education ==
Borenović was born on 4 March 1974 in Sanski Most, SFR Yugoslavia, present-day Bosnia and Herzegovina. He finished elementary and high school in Banja Luka. Only a few months after completing his education at the Banja Luka Grammar School, upon reaching adulthood, in July 1992, he joined the Army of Republika Srpska amidst the Bosnian War. During the war, intermittently, he enrolled and studied at the Faculty of Economics of the University of Banja Luka. He graduated in 2000.

In 1998, Borenović gained his first work experience in a private trading company, and in 2002 he was elected president of the supervisory board of the newly founded Housing Fund of the Republika Srpska.

== Political career ==
Borenović is one of the founders of the Party of Democratic Progress (PDP), and is a member of its presidency. He served as the first Minister of Family, Youth and Sports within the Government of Republika Srpska between February and November 2006. He was elected to the National Assembly of Republika Srpska in the 2006 general election, and was re-elected in 2010 and 2014.

On 28 November 2015, Borenović replaced Mladen Ivanić as president of the PDP. In the 2018 general election, he was elected to the national House of Representatives. He was re-elected in the 2022 general election, obtaining over 30,000 votes.

On 15 December 2024, Banja Luka mayor Draško Stanivuković succeeded Borenović as PDP president.

== Personal life ==
Borenović has been married to his wife Biljana since 1998, and together they have three sons. They live in Banja Luka.

On 5 September 2025, Borenović was attacked by two masked men who sprayed him with pepper spray outside his residence in Banja Luka. Following the attack, Borenović stated from the hospital that he was recovering, noting that his eyes burned but that he was "more troubled by the senselessness of the incident." The attack on Borenović prompted swift political and public condemnation of the assault.
