= Alen Šeranić =

Bosniak politician (born 1977)

Alen Šeranić (born 1977) is a Bosniak politician and doctor, since 2018 minister of health and social welfare for the Government of Republika Srpska entity of Bosnia and Herzegovina. A member of the Alliance of Independent Social Democrats (SNSD), he previously served as entity minister of science and technology.

== Biography ==
Alen Šeranić was born in 1977 in Banja Luka, where he attended elementary and high school. Of Bosniak nationality, he is married and father of two.

Šeranić graduated in medicine at the University of Banja Luka in 2004 and then worked for three years at the Ključ Health Center, specializing in family medicine in 2007. The same year Šeranić started working at the entity ministry of health and social welfare.

In 2010 he enrolled at Keele University in the United Kingdom, where he graduated in 2015 with a specialty in Epidemiology.

In May 2018, Šeranić succeeded Jasmin Komić as entity minister of science and technology of Republika Srpska.

At the 2018 Bosnian election Šeranić was elected to the National Assembly and on 18 December 2018 replaced Dragan Bogdanić as entity minister of health and social welfare.

On 6 June 2022, Šeranić was added by the US Treasury to the Specially Designated Nationals List of individuals whose assets are blocked and U.S. persons are generally prohibited from dealing with them. Šeranić was designated under Executive Order 14033, which targets persons who threaten the stability of the Western Balkans region through corruption, criminal activity, and other destabilizing behavior. According to the designation,

"Seranic furthered efforts to create an RS entity-level agency for medicines and medical devices that will undermine the state-level Agency for Medicinal Products and Medical Devices and is an attack on BiH's constitutional order. The United States strongly urges RS leadership to respect the Dayton Peace Agreement and return to work within existing state institutions and to reverse efforts to create illegal parallel institutions in the RS."
