= Draško Stanivuković =

Bosnian Serb politician (born 1993)

- Драшко Станивуковић
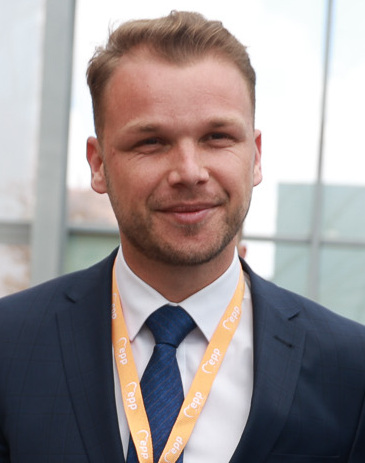
- Stanivuković in 2025

Mayor of Banja Luka
- Incumbent
- Assumed office 24 December 2020
- Preceded by: Igor Radojičić

President of the Party of Democratic Progress
- Incumbent
- Assumed office 15 December 2024
- Preceded by: Branislav Borenović
Parliamentary offices
Member of the National Assembly of Republika Srpska
In office 19 November 2018 – 24 December 2020
| Constituency | 3rd Electoral Unit |

Personal details
- Born: 21 May 1993 (age 33) Banja Luka, Bosnia and Herzegovina
- Party: Party of Democratic Progress (2011–present)
- Education: University of Banja Luka (attended)
- Website: stanivukovicdrasko.com

Draško Stanivuković (Serbian Cyrillic: Драшко Станивуковић; born 21 May 1993) is a Bosnian Serb politician who has served as mayor of Banja Luka since December 2020. He is the current president of the Party of Democratic Progress (PDP).

A member of the PDP since 2011, Stanivuković served as member of the National Assembly of Republika Srpska from 2018 to 2020.

== Early life and education ==
Stanivuković was born on 21 May 1993 in Banja Luka, Bosnia and Herzegovina, to one of the wealthiest families in the city. He finished middle and high school in his hometown. He studied at the Faculty of Economics, University of Banja Luka, but is yet to graduate.

In 2014, Stanivuković founded the Association of Citizens "Be DIFFERENT", which aimed to motivate young people and help others through various actions. He organized several protest walks and gatherings to point out the problems facing the citizens of Banja Luka, and also the whole of Bosnia and Herzegovina. They collected funds for arranging schoolyards, gymnasiums, helping people suffering from various diseases and more.

== Political career ==
=== Early tenure ===
Stanivuković has been involved in politics since he was 18, after joining the Party of Democratic Progress (PDP) in 2011. In one interview, he admitted that he wanted to engage in socially useful work and politics since he was a child, and considering that his family is one of the wealthiest in Banja Luka, he stated that gaining money was not his motive for entering politics.

From 2016 to 2018, Stanivuković was a member of the City Assembly of Banja Luka. He is the youngest elected member of the National Assembly of Republika Srpska. During the first session after the formation of the City Assembly of Banja Luka, Stanivuković stated that he waived the assembly member salary in the amount of 1000 BAM (574.42 USD) per month, and that he will distribute the funds every month to those who need it. During his tenure, he met with former UK Ambassador Edward Ferguson Austrian Chancellor Sebastian Kurz, as well as other senior officials. In March 2017, he attended the annual congress of the European People's Party in Malta.

Stanivuković has strongly criticized and accused the government of Republika Srpska, the Alliance of Independent Social Democrats (SNSD) and its leader Milorad Dodik of corruption. In one of many videos published on his Facebook page, Stanivuković teared a newly laid asphalt with his hands in order to point out the quality of the works and that the contractors violated the rules according to which the thickness of the asphalt should be eight, instead of two centimeters.

=== Early opposition ===
In the 2018 general election, Stanivuković received the highest number of votes of all candidates for deputies individually. He was declared the "biggest surprise of the election" in some media, and even a "wunderkind", while the media close to the authorities gave him the epithet "young tycoon". His candidature was endorsed by a Serbian-Canadian movie director, Boris Malagurski. He also waived his salary as member of the National Assembly of Republika Srpska.

Stanivuković was arrested on 25 December 2018, during the "Justice for David" protest organized by a group of citizens, demanding that the authorities solve the case of the murder of 21-year-old student David Dragičević. He and several other protesters were then accused of "calling for a violent change in the constitutional order of Republika Srpska." Stanivuković claimed that he was beaten on the genitalia by the police of Republika Srpska during the arrest.

In October 2019, Stanivuković tried to pass The Law on Whistleblowers, meant to protect whistleblowers. Two months later, he was slapped in the face by the Republika Srpska Minister of Interior, Dragan Lukač, after an argument during the session of the National Assembly. The following day, Stanivuković stated that Milorad Dodik, the Serb member of the collective Presidency of Bosnia and Herzegovina, had threatened him and insulted his mother, posting a video on Twitter as proof.

In February 2020, a photo of Stanivuković holding a Chetnik flag was leaked on social media, which caused outrage in the Bosniak and Croat public in which Stanivuković enjoyed a solid number of supporters. Not long after, in an interview with Face TV, Stanivuković stated that the International Criminal Tribunal for the former Yugoslavia is a political court. There was also talk about the protests in Montenegro, and Stanivuković denied the Montenegrin language and the Montenegrin Orthodox Church in the conversation. He also called Serbia his own country and said that it is natural that he loves it.

In May 2020, Stanivuković filed a report with the Banja Luka District Public Prosecutor's Office against Dodik and Dragan Lukač for unauthorized wiretapping and audio recording after Dodik publicly said that he wiretaps the opposition. Stanivuković also filed a report against the Prime Minister of Republika Srpska, Radovan Višković, and the Minister of Health, Alen Šeranić, in the case of the procurement of a mobile hospital during the COVID-19 pandemic.

Stanivuković was arrested on 29 August 2020 in Nikšić, Montenegro after participating in the anti-government religious protests in support of the Serbian Orthodox Church together with Montenegrin politician Vladislav Dajković. Shortly after, he was released and deported from Montenegro. He was banned from entering Montenegro for a year.

On 1 November 2020, the PDP announced that in the Banja Luka settlement of Kumsale, a man with a pointed gun approached Stanivuković's car looking for him. However, Stanivuković was not in the vehicle at that moment. Witnesses then headed for the Lazarevo police station, while the attacker followed them until they approached the station. The attacker was then identified, detained and prosecuted.

=== Mayor of Banja Luka (2020–present) ===
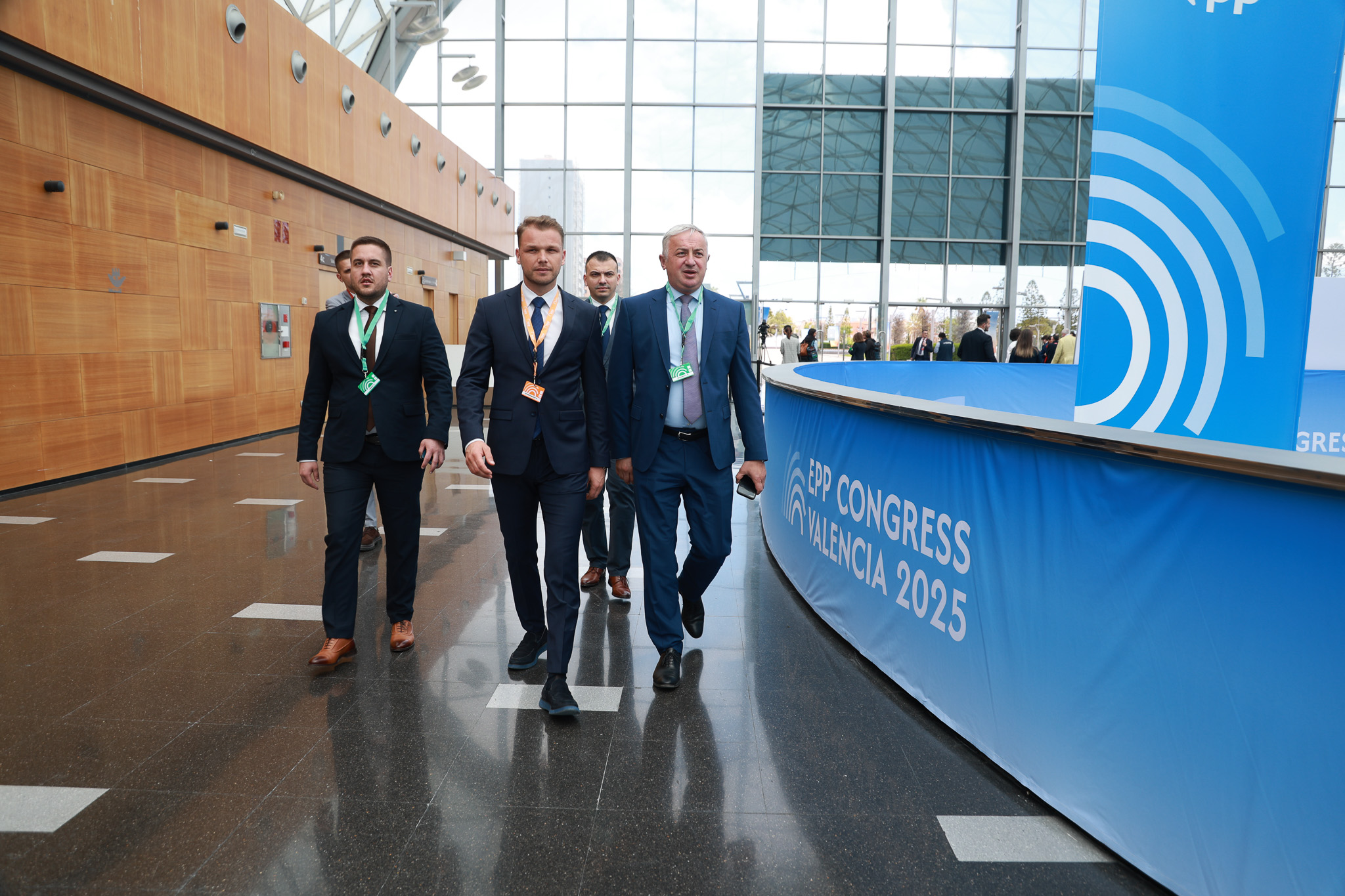
Stanivuković arriving to an EPP summit in Valencia, 29 April 2025

On 5 July 2020, it was announced that Stanivuković would run for mayor of Banja Luka as a candidate of the PDP in the 2020 Bosnian municipal elections. On 22 July, Stanivuković signed an agreement with the Serb Democratic Party (SDS), making him their candidate as well. SDS leader, Mirko Šarović, called him a candidate "who knows what the city needs" and that he had a "vision of the European Banja Luka which Republika Srpska deserves as well".

In the municipal elections, held on 15 November, Stanivuković was elected mayor of Banja Luka. He assumed office a month later, on 24 December. At 27 years of age, Stanivuković became the youngest person to assume the role of Banja Luka mayor. In June 2021, he met with mayor of Sarajevo, Benjamina Karić, in Banja Luka, marking this event the first time since the end of the Bosnian War in 1995, that the mayors of both Sarajevo and Banja Luka, as the two largest cities of Bosnia and Herzegovina, had met each other.

In August 2023, Stanivuković banned several musicians from Belgrade, in particular the rap duo Desingerica and Pljugica, from performing in Banja Luka due to the alleged promotion of wrong values. Stanivuković later justified his decision by explaining that he was "banning primitivism, not art."

In the 2024 municipal elections, Stanivuković was re-elected as mayor, obtaining 49.48% of the vote among three other candidates. On 15 December 2024, he replaced Branislav Borenović as the new president of the PDP.

Political offices
| Preceded by Igor Radojičić | Mayor of Banja Luka; 2020–present | Incumbent |
