= Admir Čavalić =

Bosnian economic analyst and lecturer

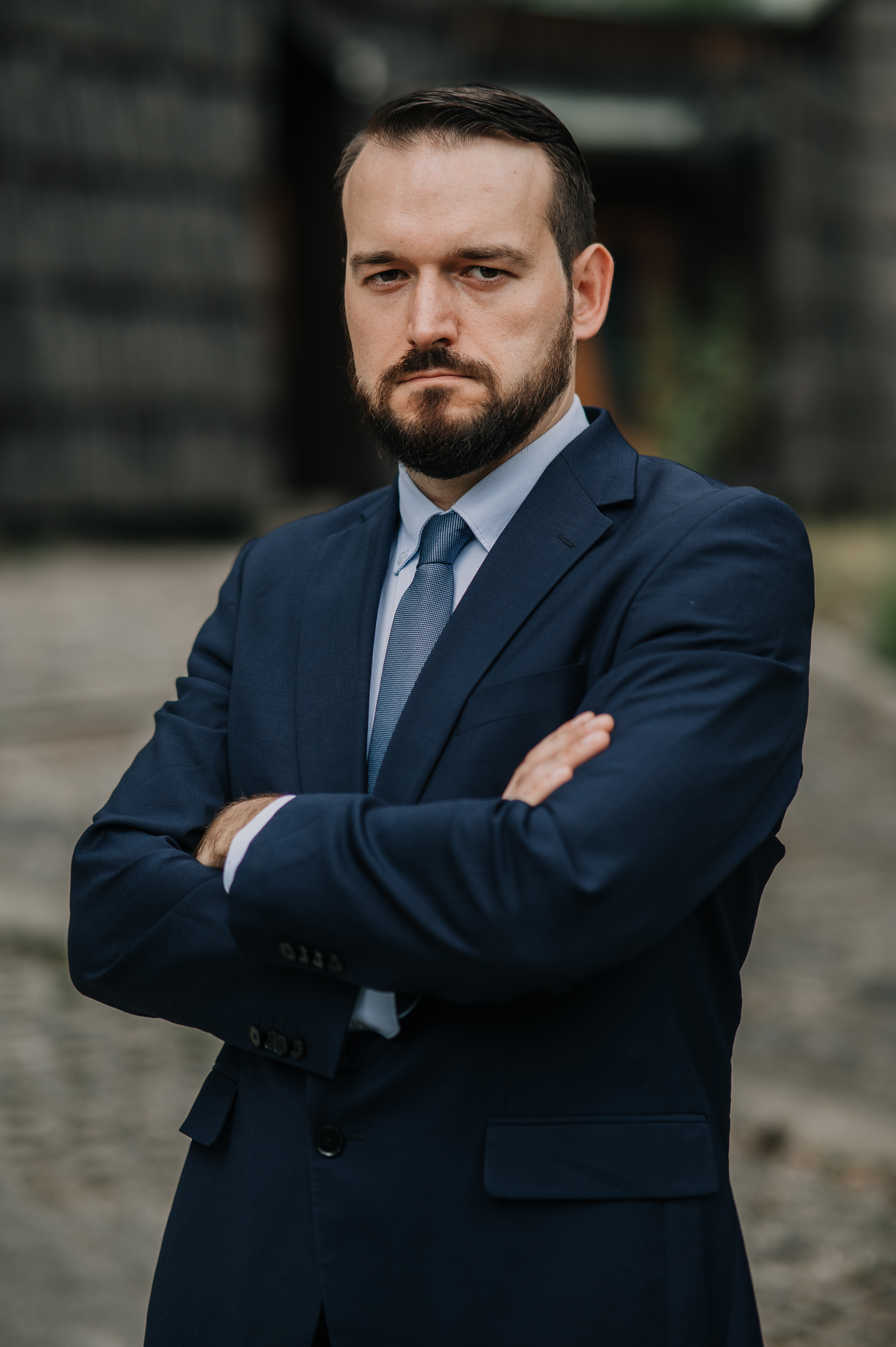
- Occupations: Director of the "Multi" Association and OPEN Fest
- Spouse: Sabina Čavalić

Admir Čavalić (born 4 October 1987) is a Bosnian economic analyst, member of the federal parliament, lecturer and researcher, who is best known as the founder of the Association "Multi", the pioneer and largest libertarian non-profit organization in Bosnia and Herzegovina.

== Career ==
Admir Čavalić was born in Tuzla on October 4, 1987. He finished elementary school and high school in Tuzla. At the end of 2011, he graduated from the Faculty of Economics, University of Tuzla, where he defended two master's theses (2015 and 2017) and finished PhD studies. Čavalić finished the LAAD program under the mentorship of Francis Fukuyama (Sarajevo, Bosnia and Herzegovina) and the CPR Research School (Kochi, India). Čavalić is connected to Mont Pelerin Society.

Čavalić is the director of OPEN Fest, the largest libertarian festival in Europe. He teaches at Faculty of Economics in Tuzla, as an assistant teacher and at IPI academy as a professor. Čavalić made the first Bosnian documentary about economics, titled "Economy".

He is one of the public advocates for the legalization of cannabis for health purposes in Bosnia and Herzegovina and a promoter of the use of BitCoin and other cryptocurrencies. In particular, he is known for his numerous works and public advocacy for the existing decentralized structure of Bosnia and Herzegovina. Čavalić argues that the cantons in the Federation of Bosnia and Herzegovina are a good thing and that they should be preserved, with further delegation of power from higher levels of government.

He has been running the Tuzla County Privatization Agency since 2020. He is a member of City council of Tuzla.

== Publications ==
- Islam and the Free Market (Tuzla, 2014)
- Corporate social responsibility and human resources (Tuzla, 2018)
- Covid-19, economic consequences for Bosnia and Herzegovina, measures, and solutions (Sarajevo, 2020)
- Populism, selected topics (Tuzla, 2020)

In 2014, in co-authorship with Dženan Smajić, Čavalić published a book entitled "Islam and the Free Market". The book seeks to make a synthesis of libertarian ideas and classical Islamic teachings. Book was promoted in Bosnia and Herzegovina, region, as well in United States and Germany, and has got great attention, especially from critics. In collaboration with Adisa Delić and Dijana Husaković, Čavalić published the book "Corporate Social Responsibility and Human Resources". Together with Faruk Hadžić and Damir Bećirović, in April 2020 he made a comprehensive report "Covid-19, economic consequences for Bosnia and Herzegovina, measures and solutions" published by the Friedrich Naumann Foundation. In June 2020, the book "Populism, Selected Topics" was published. Book was edited by Čavalić.

Čavalić has been published in Bosnian publications including Dnevni Avaz, Klix.ba, CampusEurope, Vijesti.ba, Faktor.ba, Bljesak.info. On television, Čavalić has appeared on Face TV Centralni dnevnik with Senad Hadžifejzović, N1’ Pressing, BTH1 Dnevnik/Tema dana, Hayat TV Dnevnik, RTVTK Dnevnik, TV7 and many other TV stations in Bosnia and Herzegovina.
