= University of Banja Luka =

University in Bosnia and Herzegovina

- Универзитет у Бањој Луци; Univerzitet u Banjoj Luci
- Type: Public university
- Established: 7 November 1975; 50 years ago
- Founders: Socialist Republic of Bosnia and Herzegovina
- Affiliations: EUA; Magna Charta Universitatum; EMUNI; AUF
- Religious affiliation: secular institution
- Budget: €17.81 million (2015)
- Rector: Radoslav Gajanin
- Academic staff: 811
- Administrative staff: 559
- Students: 11,186 (2018–19)
- Location: Univerzitetski grad; Bulevar vojvode Petra Bojovica 1A; Banja Luka, Republika Srpska, Bosnia and Herzegovina; 44.7749504°N 17.2117138°E
Colors
Blue and white
- Website: unibl.org

University rankings

Regional – Overall
- QS Emerging Europe and Central Asia: 301-350 (2022)

The University of Banja Luka (Serbian: Универзитет у Бањој Луци, romanized: Univerzitet u Banjoj Luci, Bosnian: Univerzitet u Banjoj Luci, Croatian: Sveučilište u Banjoj Luci, Latin: Universitas Studiorum Bania Lucensis) is the second-oldest university in Bosnia and Herzegovina. A public university, it is the flagship institution of higher education in Republika Srpska, one of two entities of Bosnia and Herzegovina. As of the 2018–19 school year, there are 11,186 enrolled students.

The university grew out of faculties established in Banja Luka after the end of the World War II either as independent schools or branches of the University of Sarajevo. The University of Banja Luka maintains close ties with educational institutions in neighboring countries of the former Yugoslavia, especially those in the Republic of Serbia.

The QS World University Rankings placed the University of Banja Luka in the 251–300 range in the Emerging Europe and Central Asia in 2019. In 2018, Webometrics Ranking of World Universities ranked it as Bosnia’s second best university among the 59 ranked institutions of tertiary education from the country. In the 2015 fiscal year, the Government of Republika Srpska ensured 34,897,600 BAMs for the university's budget constituting its primary source of funding for standard running costs.

== History ==
=== Post-World War II years ===
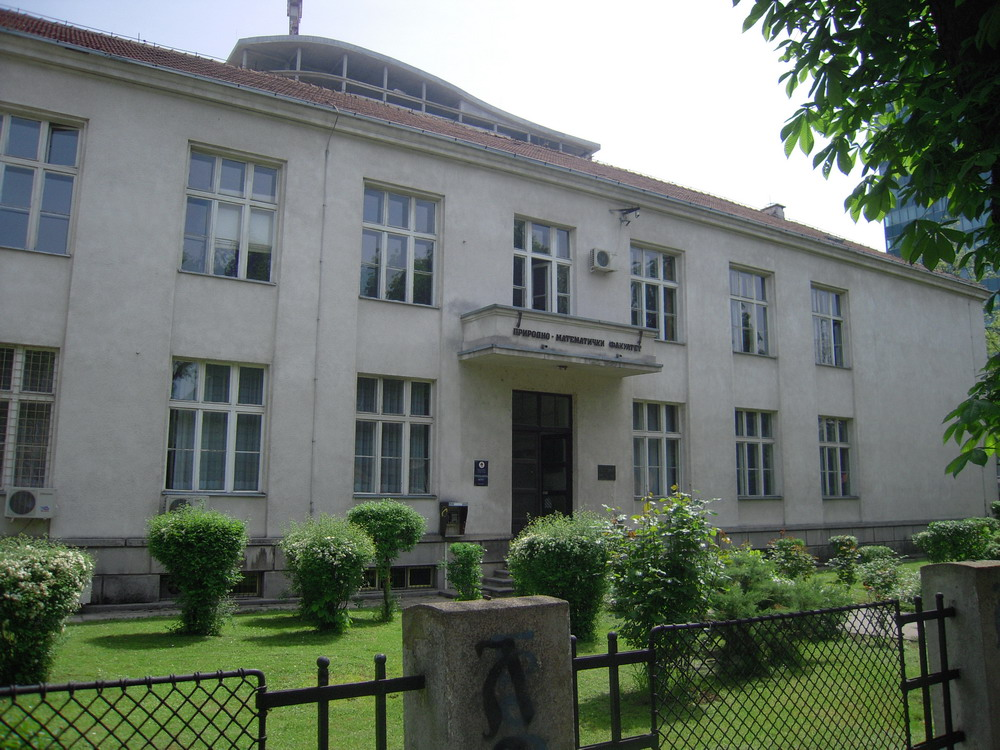
Faculty of Natural Sciences and Mathematics

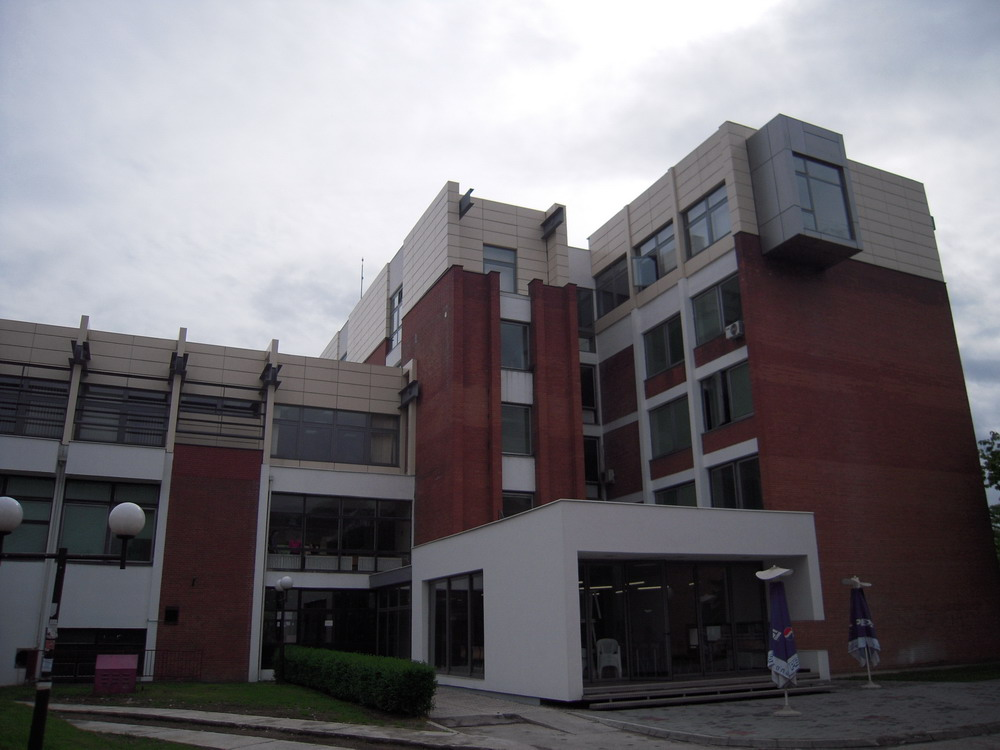
Faculty of Economics

The first Pedagogical School in Banja Luka was established in 1950 when it enrolled its first 38 students. The Faculty of Technical Studies was established in 1961 and the Faculty of Economics in 1969. Subsequently University of Sarajevo faculties of engineering, law and economics opened their local branches in Banja Luka. Over the period of four years each local branch in Banja Luka was transformed into an independent faculty in its own right.

=== 1975–1992 ===
The University of Banja Luka was established on 7 November 1975 as the second university established in the Socialist Republic of Bosnia and Herzegovina. The 1970s were a period of expansion of higher education in the Socialist Federal Republic of Yugoslavia during which along with Banja Luka's modern day University of Montenegro, University of Kragujevac, University of Rijeka, University of Split, University of Maribor, University of Osijek, St. Clement of Ohrid University of Bitola, University of Tuzla and University of Mostar were all established.

In its early years the university was faced with lack of academic and administrative staff and their inadequate academic qualifications. University inaugurated its first five-year development plan in 1976. The plan highlighted priorities of construction of dormitories, student scholarships provisions, expansion and strengthening of the Central Youth Cooperative, construction of sports and recreation center, student clinics and development of mass cultural activities. Up to 1984 university awarded 13 Doctor of Philosophy degrees. In the same period of time university published 47 textbooks and 95 academic books.

In 1987 the University of Banja Luka was the presiding institution of the Community of Universities of Yugoslavia. In 1989/90 it presided over the Community of Universities of the Socialist Republic of Bosnia and Herzegovina. In 1989 it became member of the Rector Conference of the Alps-Adriatic Working Group while some of its first scientific articles were indexed in international databases.

=== 1992–1995 Bosnian War ===
The period of the Bosnian War created new challenges with decreasing numbers of students, decreased staff and funding. Institution's function was not stopped during the war and it continued its functions in limited capacity.

=== Modern Period ===
Contrary to the situation in the Federation of Bosnia and Herzegovina where each of its 10 cantons have its own ministry of education and legislative power over higher education, higher education in Republika Srpska is regulated by the Ministry of Education and Culture of the Government of Republika Srpska. Council of Ministers of Bosnia and Herzegovina which function as the executive branch of the government of Bosnia and Herzegovina do not have explicit competency for higher education or its own education ministry.

The full implementation of the Bologna Process at the University of Banja Luka was initiated in 2006/2007 academic year. Some faculties implemented the reform earlier.

Since April 13, 2011, the University of Banja Luka is full member of the European University Association. It is also member of European Forest Institute and participate in TEMPUS, CEEPUS and 7th Framework Programme programme.

In the aftermath of 2014 Southeast Europe floods the University of Ljubljana donated 25,000 BAM for the most affected students and staff members at the University of Banja Luka. Czech Technical University in Prague donated technical equipment needed to respond to the consequences of floods.

Through student exchange programs university hosted students from Sapienza University of Rome, Plovdiv University, the University of Strasbourg, the University of Graz, the University of the District of Columbia, the University of Pristina in North Mitrovica and the University of Freiburg.

== Organization ==
=== Faculties ===
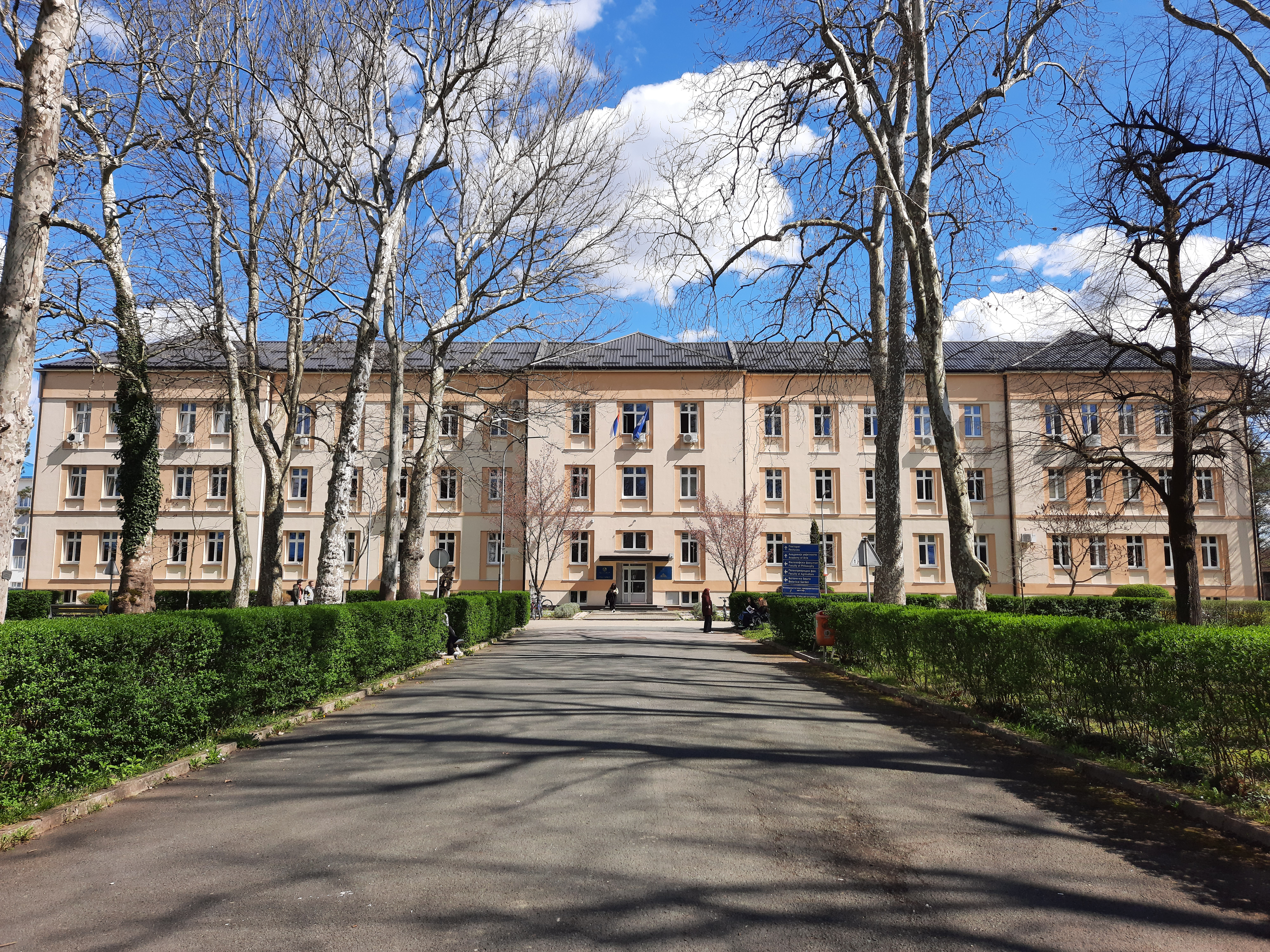
Academy of Arts & Rectorate

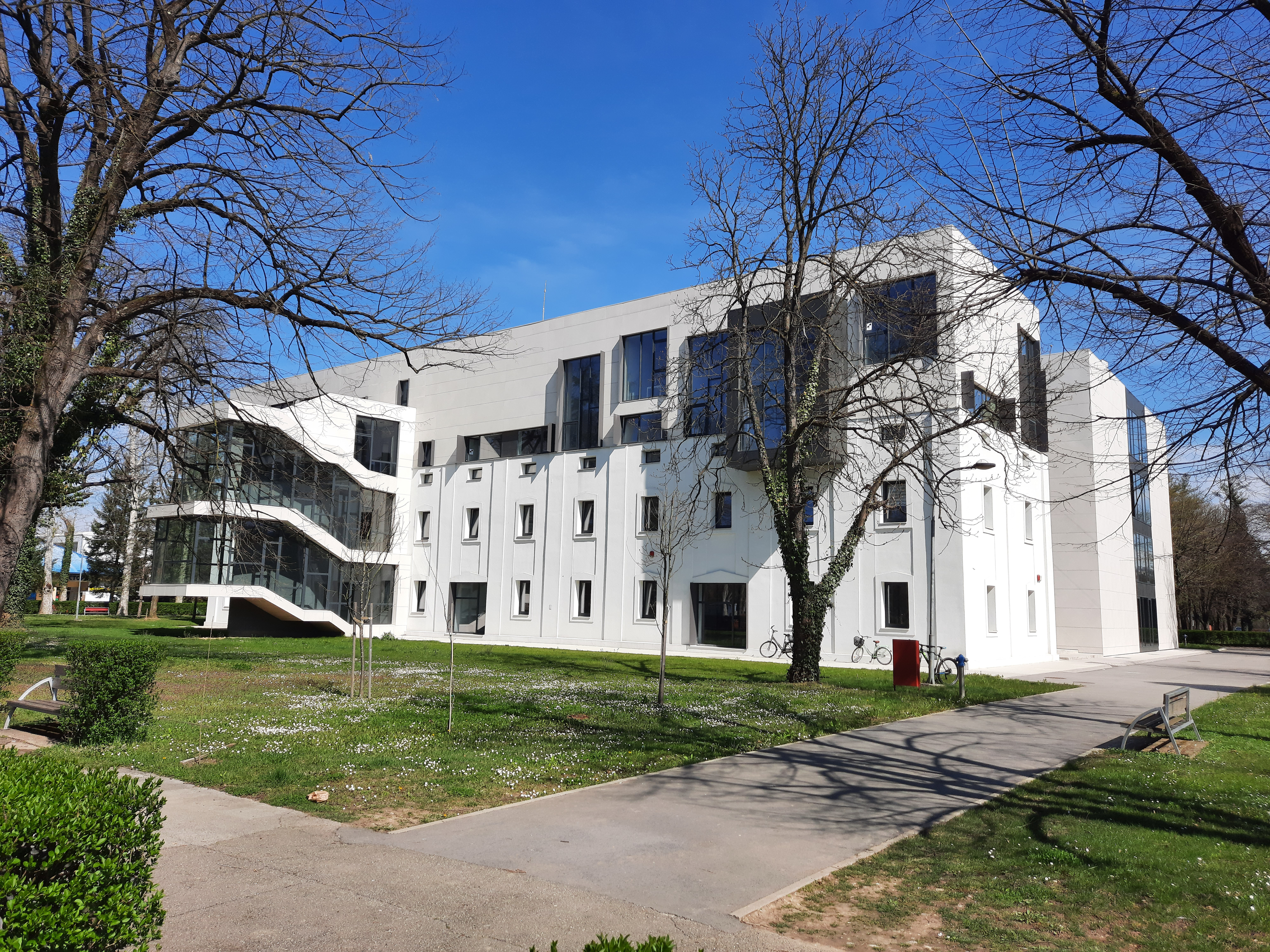
Faculty of Architecture and Civil Engineering

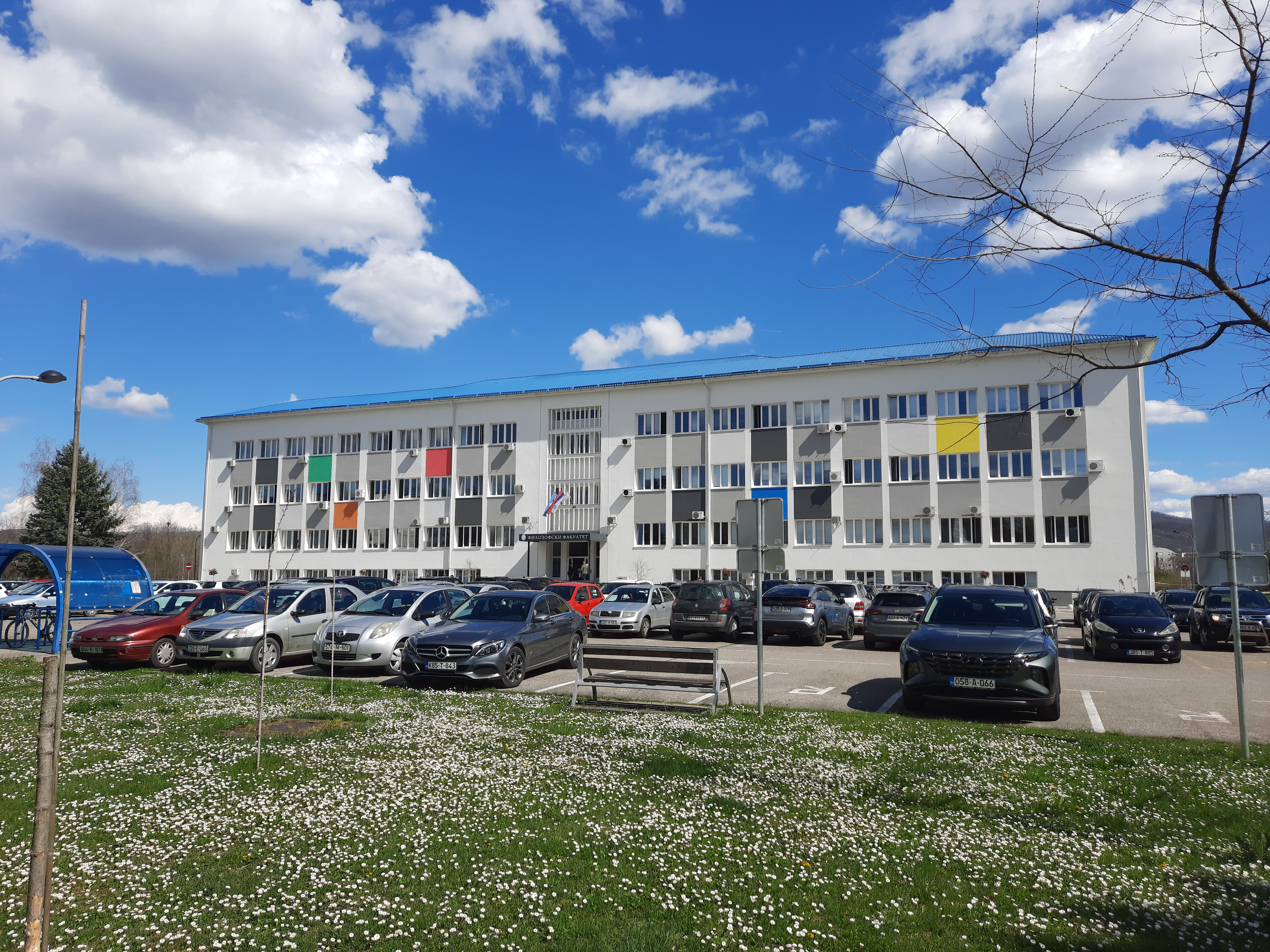
Faculty of Philosophy

Most of the current 16 faculties of the University of Banja Luka are divided between the two main campuses, both located close to the Vrbas river close to the city center of Banja Luka.

The university is divided into 16 faculties:

- Academy of Arts
- Faculty of Architecture and Civil Engineering
- Faculty of Economics (official website)
- Faculty of Electrical Engineering (official website)
- Faculty of Philosophy
- Faculty of Mechanical Engineering
- Faculty of Mine Engineering
- Faculty of Medicine (with University Clinical Center of the Republika Srpska)
- Faculty of Agriculture
- Faculty of Law
- Faculty of Natural sciences and Mathematics (including Chemical engineering, Process engineering and Biotechnology) (official website)
- Faculty of Forestry
- Faculty of Philology (official website)
- Faculty of Political Sciences
- Faculty of Physical Education and Sports

=== Rectors ===
- Milan Mataruga (2016–2017): University education completed at the University of Belgrade and PhD at the University of Belgrade and World Forestry Center.
- Stanko Stanić (2006–2016): University education completed at the University of Banja Luka and University of Zagreb and PhD at the University of Sarajevo.
- Dragoljub Mirjanić (1992–2006): University education completed at the University of Novi Sad and University of Zagreb and PhD at the University of Novi Sad.
- Rajko Kuzmanović (1988–1992): University education completed at the University of Zagreb and PhD at the University of Mostar.
- Dragica Dodig (1984–1988): first female rector of the university. University education completed at the University of Zagreb and PhD at the Faculty of Technology in Tuzla.
- Ibrahim Tabaković (1979–1984): University education and PhD completed at the University of Zagreb
- Dragomir Malić (1975–1979): University education completed at the University of Belgrade and PhD at the TU Wien.

== University cooperation ==
The University of Banja Luka has agreements on cooperation with other 100 higher education institutions. In January 2018 institution adopted the Strategy for Internationalization of the University of Banja Luka. It defines specific steps to be taken in the process of internationalization of scientific research, teaching and support. At the end of the same month Confucius Institute at the University of Banja Luka was established aiming at promotion of Chinese language and culture. Opening was attended by the ambassador of the People's Republic of China, rector of the Tianjin University of Technology and Education and the delegation from the city of Tianjin.

== Notable alumni and faculty members ==
=== Alumni ===
- Aleksandra Čvorović, Writer, journalist and librarian
- Branislav Borenović, Bosnian Serb politician
- Borjana Krišto, Bosnian Croat politician
- Dragan Bogdanic, Bosnian Serb politician
- Drago Prgomet, member of Croatian Parliament
- Draško Stanivuković, Bosnian Serb politician
- Igor Crnadak, Bosnian Serb politician
- Mladen Ivanić, Bosnian Serb politician
- Ognjen Tadić, Bosnian Serb politician
- Savo Minić, Bosnian Serb politician
- Tanja Stupar-Trifunović, Poet
- Željka Cvijanović, Bosnian Serb politician
- Željko Kopanja, Bosnian Serb newspaper editor
- Željko Topić, Vice-Presidents of the European Patent Office

=== Faculty ===
- Aleksa Buha, philosopher and member of the Academy of Sciences and Arts of the Republika Srpska
- Anđelko Habazin, Croatian philosopher
- Branko Blanuša, Bosnian Serb politician
- Ivana Dulić-Marković, professor at the Faculty of Agriculture
- Ivo Visković, Serbian politician and diploma
- Miloš Mihajlović, Serbian pianist and university professor
- Miodrag Simović, Judge of the Constitutional Court of Bosnia and Herzegovina
- Nedeljko Čubrilović, Speaker of the National Assembly of Republika Srpska
- Nikola Srdić, Serbian clarinetist
- Nikola Špirić, Bosnian Serb politician
- Rade Mihaljčić, Serbian historian and academic
- Vilim Herman, university professor at the University of Osijek

== See also ==
- List of universities in Bosnia and Herzegovina
- National and University Library of the Republika Srpska
- Archives of Republika Srpska
- Museum of Modern Art of Republika Srpska
- Banja Luka Gymnasium
- Banski Dvor
