= Law enforcement in Bosnia and Herzegovina =

Law enforcement system in Bosnia and Herzegovina Sistem policije Bosne i Hercegovine

Agency overview
- Formed: 1995 (post-war restructuring)

Jurisdictional structure
- Operations jurisdiction: BA
- Governing body: Ministry of Security (Bosnia and Herzegovina)

Operational structure
- Headquarters: Sarajevo

Crime in Bosnia and Herzegovina
- Homicide: 1.0 (2024)
- Assault: 24.9 (2023)
- Burglary: 89.8 (2024)
- Theft: 94.4 (2024)
- Fraud: 14.0 (2024)
- Corruption: 17.8 (2024)
- Bribery: 1.8 (2024)
- Money laundering: 3.3 (2024)
- Rape: 1.1 (2023)
- Sexual violence: 6.2 (2023)
- reported per 100,000 inhabitants

Law enforcement in Bosnia and Herzegovina is primarily the responsibility of the domestic police structures of the country, which are divided along entity lines between the Ministry of Interior (Republika Srpska) and the cantonal Ministries of Interior within the Federation of Bosnia and Herzegovina. At the state level, coordination and specialized policing functions are carried out by the Ministry of Security of Bosnia and Herzegovina, which oversees police coordination and policy implementation across the country, as well as agencies such as the State Investigation and Protection Agency (SIPA) and the Border Police of Bosnia and Herzegovina.

International involvement in policing followed the Bosnian War, when the United Nations deployed the International Police Task Force (IPTF) as part of peace implementation efforts. Since 2003 but operational law enforcement authority remains with domestic institutions.

== History ==
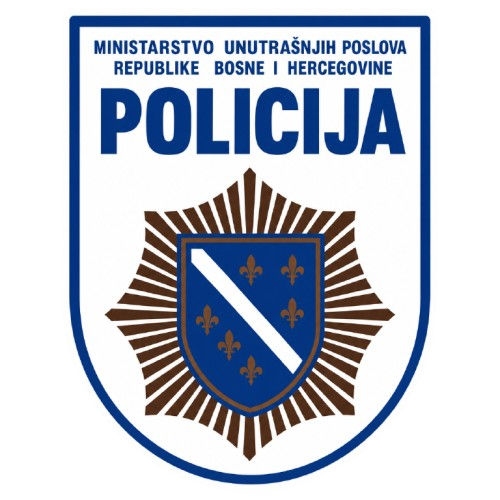
Former Emblem of the Republic of Bosnia and Hezergovina Police

=== Post-war reforms and restructuring ===
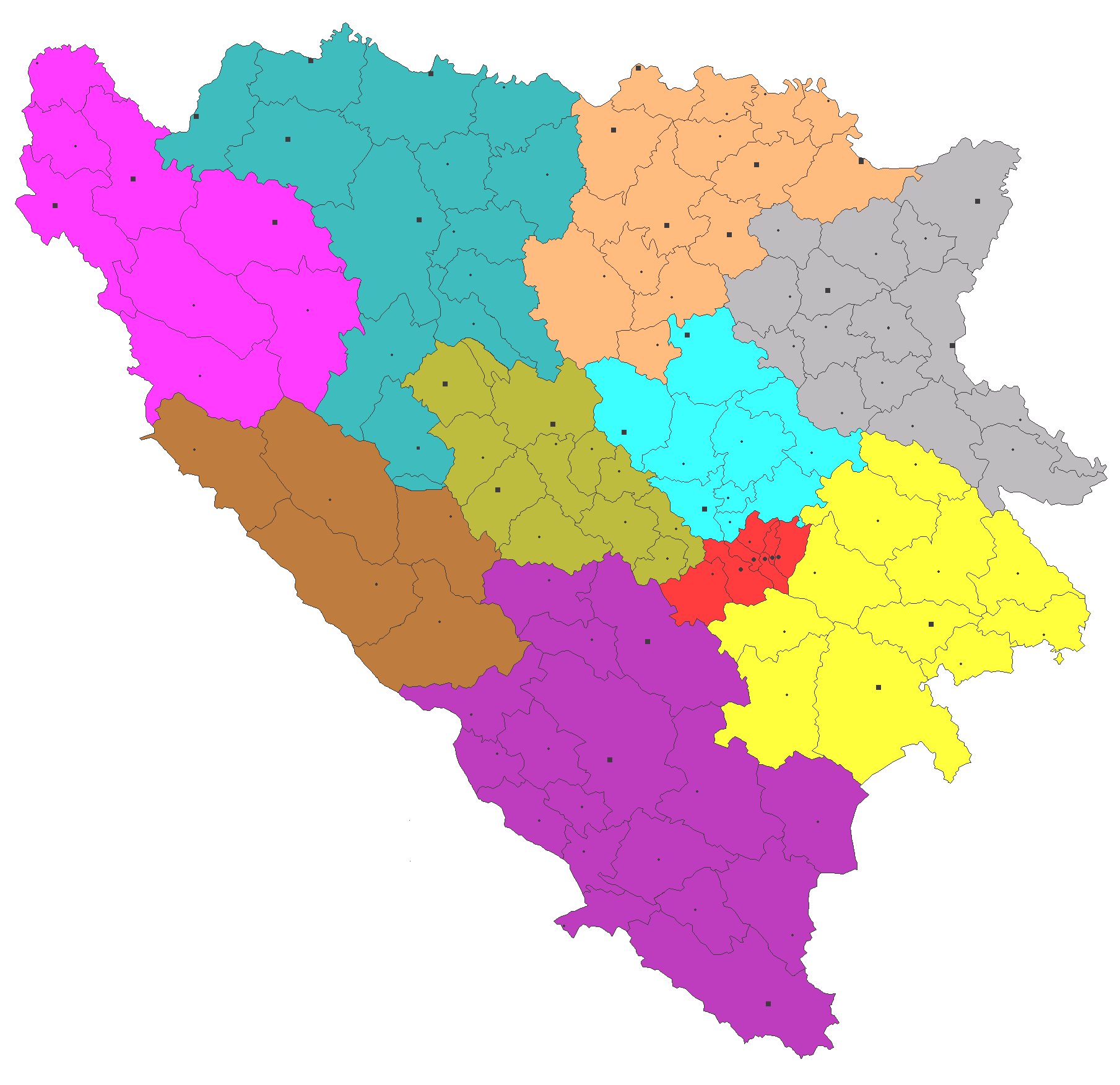
Proposed police regions under the OHR/EU police reform plan

Following the end of the Bosnian War in 1995, Bosnia and Herzegovina inherited a decentralised policing system under the Dayton Agreement. On 1 January 2003, the European Union Police Mission (EUPM) replaced the United Nations mission and took over international support for police reform, including cooperation with SIPA and the Ministry of Security.

The Police Restructuring Commission examined proposals for creating functional police regions crossing entity and cantonal boundaries, including regional centres in Sarajevo, Banja Luka, Mostar, Tuzla, and Zenica, with alternatives such as Doboj and Brčko. These proposals faced political disagreement, with Republika Srpska opposing the abolition of entity-level police forces and the transfer of policing competencies to the state level. No consensus was reached on a unified model.

Bosnia and Herzegovina retained a decentralised system of law enforcement divided along entity and cantonal lines.

== See also ==
- Ministry of Interior (Federation of Bosnia and Herzegovina)
- Ministry of Interior (Republika Srpska)
- Police of Republika Srpska

== Sources ==
- Ryan, Barry J. (2011). Statebuilding and Police Reform: The Freedom of Security. Routledge. ISBN 978-1-135-24473-6.
- Innes, Michael A. (2006). Bosnian Security After Dayton: New Perspectives. Routledge. ISBN 978-1-134-14872-1.
- Fischer, Martina, ed. (2006). Peacebuilding and Civil Society in Bosnia-Herzegovina: Ten Years After Dayton. LIT Verlag Münster. ISBN 978-3-8258-8793-3.
- Berg, Louis-Alexandre (2022). Governing Security After War: The Politics of Institutional Change in the Security Sector. Oxford University Press. pp. 140–141. ISBN 0-19-7572405.
