= Đerić =

Đerić (Serbian Cyrillic: Ђерић; also transliterated Djerić) is a Serbian surname. It may refer to:

- Ivančica Đerić (born 1969), Writer
- Radoje Đerić (born 1991), Serbian rower
- Uroš Đerić (born 1992), Serbian football player
- Zoran Đerić, Bosnian Serb politician
