= KMF Policajac =

Futsal club from Bosnia and Herzegovina

Policajac
- Full name: Клуб малог фудбала Полицајац; Klub malog fudbala Policajac
- Nickname(s): Policajci
- Founded: 2018; 7 years ago
- Ground: Banja Luka; Bosnia and Herzegovina
- Chairman: Borislav Šarić
- Coach: Srđan Tomašević
- League: Second Futsal League of Republika Srpska – West
- 2018–19: 1st, 2nd Futsal League of Republika Srpska – West
Home colours	Away colours

Futsal Club Policajac (Futsal Club Police Officer; Serbian: Клуб малог фудбала Полицајац, Klub malog fudbala Policajac) is futsal club from Banja Luka, Bosnia and Herzegovina. The club was founded in 2018.

Structure of the club are mainly police officers of the Police of Republika Srpska which take 80% of the club including the chairman of the club Borislav Šarić, that is chief of one police administration. Its first match was played in Mrkonjić Grad against KMF Gradiška on 4 November 2018.

Season 2018–19 finished in Second Futsal League of Republika Srpska – West as champion so the club is qualified for First Futsal League of Republika Srpska of Football Association of Republika Srpska and during 2018–19 had only one lose against KMF Jošavka.

== 2018—19 ==
As debutant in 2nd league KMF Policajac entered into futsal scene of Republika Srpska and Banja Luka got one more futsal club beside KMF Starčevica and KMF Sokrates. Policajac competed in 2nd Futsal League of Republika Srpska – West and in Cup of Republika Srpska. In Cup of Republika Srpska the club was eliminated in round of 16 by first league club KMF Kotor Varoš (5:3). 2nd Futsal League of Republika Srpska – West finished as first and it is promoted into 1st Futsal League of Republika Srpska that begins in November 2019. Before start of the new futsal season the club got few new players.

In category of futsal senior teams Policajac took first place on Futsal City Tournament in Mrkonjić Grad played in February 2019.

Legend
Win
Draw
Lose

Round and date	Home	Result	Away
1 – 14 November 2018	Policajac	5:1	Gradiška
2 – 11 November 2018	Ljubić	2:9	Policajac
3 – 18 November 2018	Policajac	4:4	Sokrates
4 – 27 November 2018	Starčevica	1:3	Policajac
5 – 2 December 2018	Policajac	2:1	Čelinac
6 – 10 December 2018	Policajac	6:1	Viktorija
7 – 16 December 2018	Jošavka	1:2	Policajac
8 – 2 February 2019	Gradiška	0:6	Policajac
9 – 19 February 2019	Policajac	10:0	Ljubić
10 – 26 February 2019	Sokrates	0:3	Policajac
11 – 5 March 2019	Policajac	3:3	Starčevica
12 – 11 March 2019	Čelinac	1:9	Policajac
13 – 15 March 2019	Viktorija	2:5	Policajac
14 – 22 March 2019	Policajac	1:3	Jošavka

== Leagues results ==
Season	League	Position	Pts	P	W	D	L	GF	GA
2018–19	2nd Futsal League – West	1	35	14	11	2	1	68	20
2019—20	1st Futsal League of Republika Srpska	–	–	–	–	–	–	–	–
Totals	Leagues	1 Title	35	14	11	2	1	68	20
