= Gendarmerie (Republika Srpska) =

Gendarmerie unit in Republika Srpska

Gendarmerie of the Ministry of Interior of Republika Srpska Жандармерија Министарства унутрашњих послова Републике Српске Žandarmerija Ministarstva unutrašnjih poslova Republike Srpske
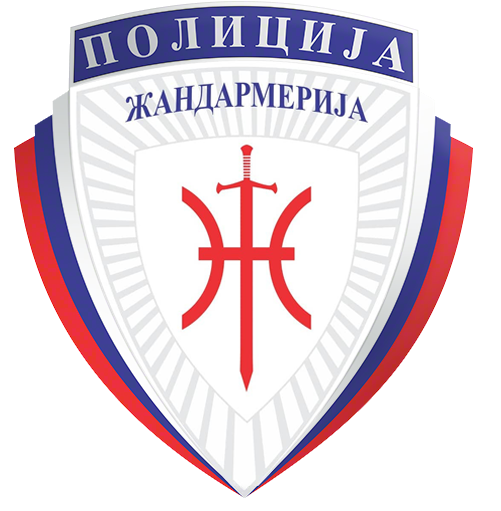

Agency overview
- Formed: September 24, 2019; August 1, 2000 (first formed unit in Zvornik as Support Unit)
- Preceding agency: Support Unit of the Ministry of Interior

Jurisdictional structure
- Operations jurisdiction: BA-SRP
- Governing body: Ministry of Interior
- General nature: Gendarmerie

Operational structure
- Overseen by: Administration of the Police
- Minister responsible: Željko Budimir, Minister of Interior of Republika Srpska
- Agency executive: Dragoslav Banović, Commander

Website
- www.mup.vladars.net

The Gendarmerie of the Ministry of Interior of Republika Srpska (Serbian: Жандармерија Министарства унутрашњих послова Републике Српске, romanized: Žandarmerija Ministarstva unutrašnjih poslova Republike Srpska) is a special security force unit of the Police of Republika Srpska. Its duties are complex missions linked with protection of order in Republika Srpska.

It was formed in September 2019 and ceremonially promoted on September 24, 2019 in Training Center of the Ministry of Interior in Zalužani where it is seated.

== Unit ==
Every member of the Gendarmerie has an assault or automatic rifle (one of them is the Taurus ART556) and a new handgun. Besides "standard" weapon unit has sniper rifles, chemical weapon, and four BOVs given by the Special Anti-Terrorist Unit. The Gendarmerie is under control of the Police Administration and the unit has a unique command in the Ministry of Interior - it has a commander, deputy commander, and commander assistants. Unit is formed in the Administration of the Police. Gendarmerie has 12 units located in every police administration (except for the Police administration Istočno Sarajevo which has two because of geographical characteristics) and in Administration of the Police. Under the control of Gendarmerie Command, there are two parts of the unit: Gendarmerie Unit in the Seat of the Ministry and Gendarmerie units on terrain.

The Gendarmerie helps other police units and command units when two or more Gendarmerie units are in the territory of one police administration. It helps with peace and order at public events and it supports general police units in high-risk missions. Also, the Gendarmerie makes blockades and watches terrain to identify criminals and victims if it is necessary. In general, the Gendarmerie is a specially trained and equipped unit for special missions. Unit inherited all duties of previous support units and expanded its duties to duties similar to Gendarmerie of Serbia. By definition, it provides help to all operative police administrations and Special Anti-Terrorist Unit.

== Cavalry unit ==
The Gendarmerie Cavalry unit is a horse-mounted unit. It secures high-risk public meetings, restores order when it is disrupted, assists in complex missions, blockades and raids, helps other police units in emergencies, and does police duties when necessary.

In the Training Center, there are 12 officers who work with horses taken from stud "Vučjak" near Prnjavor. Because of good cooperation with the Police Brigade of Police of Serbia Gendarmerie Cavalry Unit provides knowledge and training from already experienced units and officers. Primarily this unit must prevent, keep, and protect citizens from any disturbance of public peace and order. Unit appeared for the first time on the 2018 Republic Day parade and it was systematized as a unit of the Ministry in 2017. The Commandeer of the unit is Vinko Brborović.

== Support unit ==
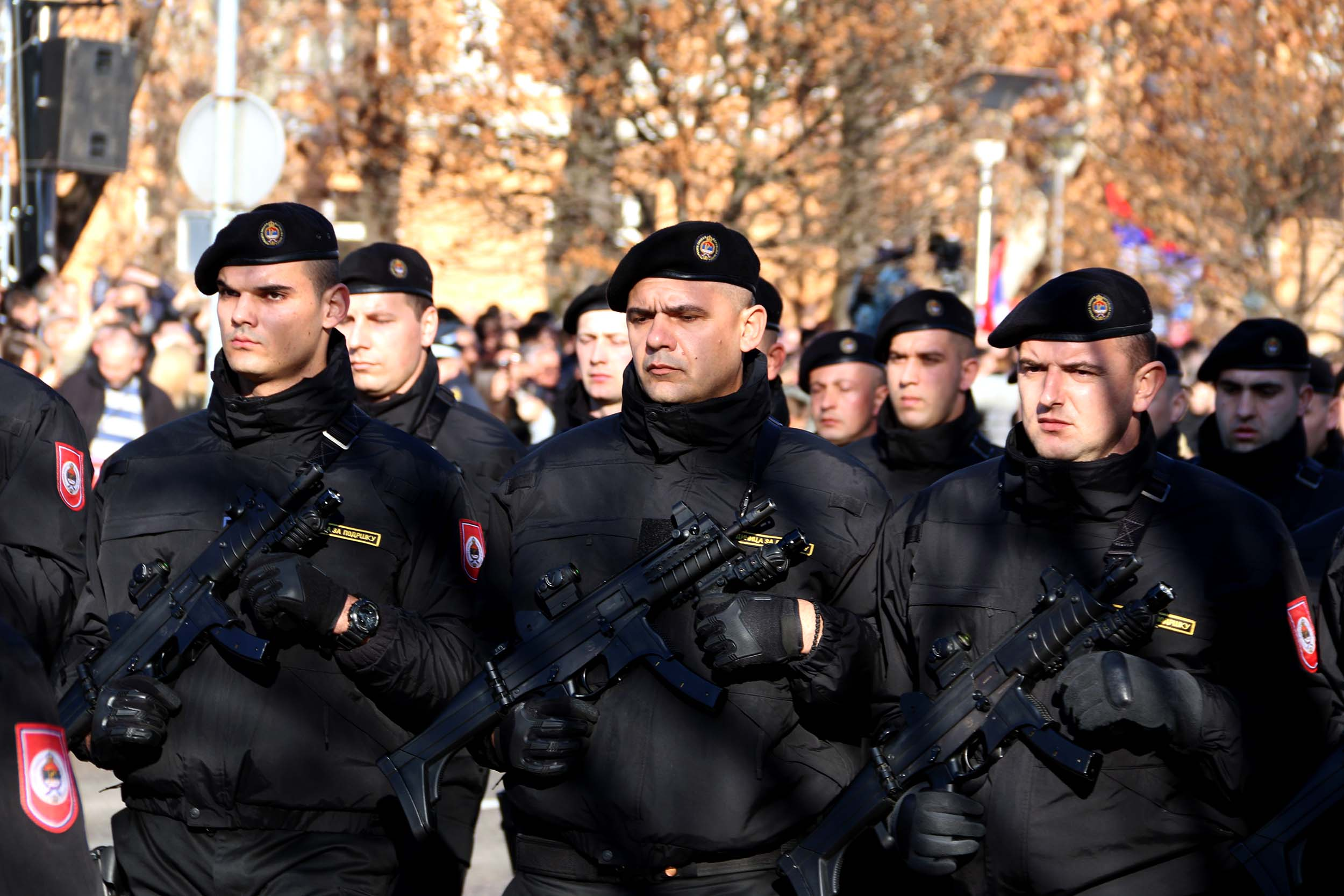
Support Unit during parade in Banja Luka 2019

Before September 2019 the Gendarmerie was known as Support Unit (Serbian: Јединица за подршку, Jedinica za podršku, short ЈЗП/JZP) and was the anti-riot unit of Police of Republika Srpska.

The duties of the unit are the protection of public order in high-risk situations, protection of citizens, liberation of hostages, counter-terrorism, supporting ordinary police units during police actions, and protection of citizens during weather disasters.

Equipment was divided into two main categories: protection equipment and armament. Protection equipment includes class A3 ballistic helmets, protection vests, and tactical vests. Armaments are based on the Taurus 9mm rifle and Glock-17 pistol.

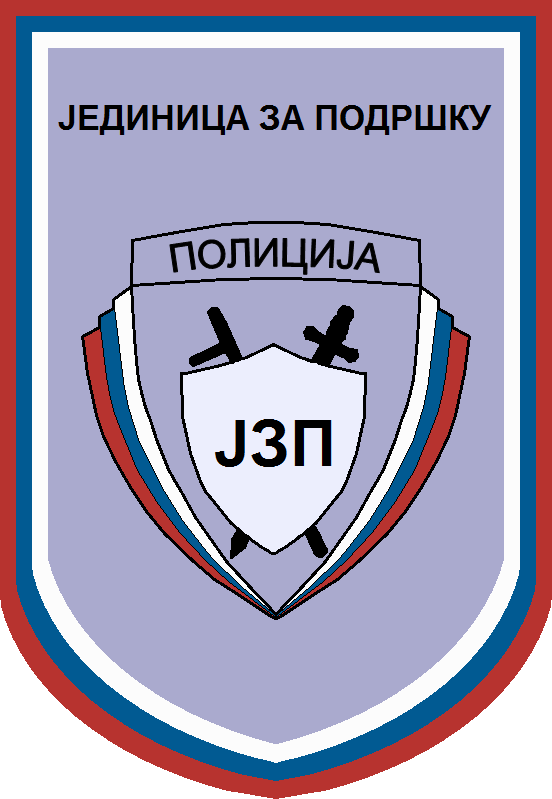
Uniform right arm patch of the Support Unit

The main reasons cited for the transformation into gendarmerie were problems with establishing police reserve units, local problems, and problems with illegal migrants. The gendarmerie is formed of former members of the Support Unit and new police officers who were cadets and graduated from the Police Academy in Banja Luka.

== See also ==
- Police of Republika Srpska
- Ministry of Interior (Republika Srpska)
