= Starčevica =

Starčevica Старчевица
- Neighborhood
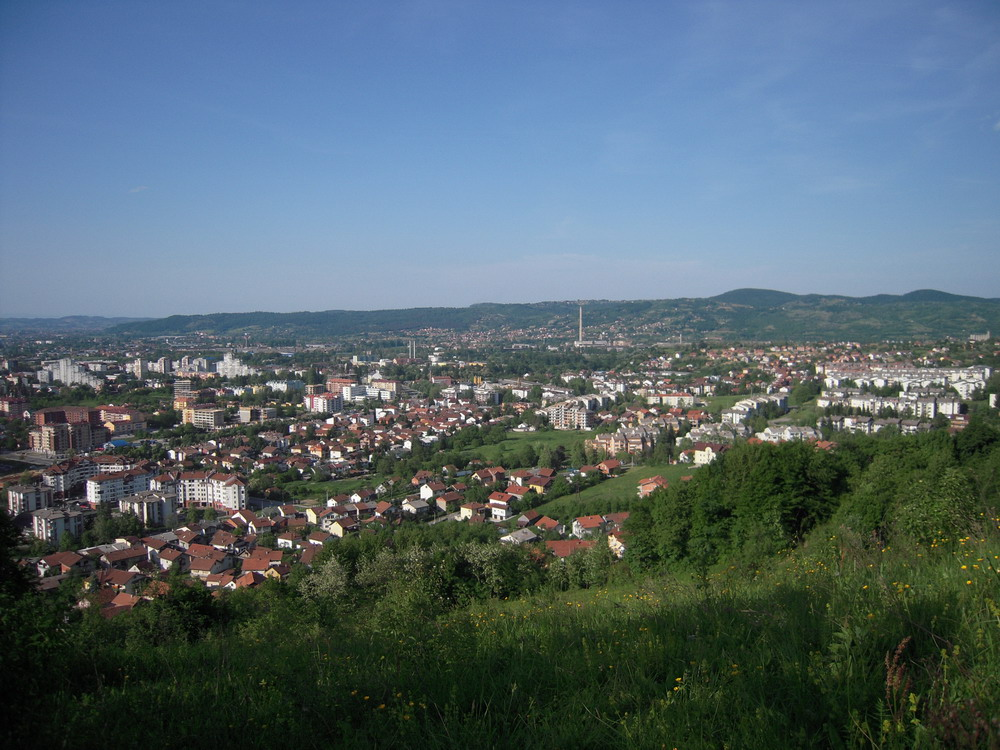
- Look on Starčevica
- Etymology: derived from family name Starčević
- Interactive map of Starčevica
- Coordinates: 44°45′41.6″N 17°12′33.8″E
- Entity: Republika Srpska
- Country: Bosnia and Herzegovina
- City: Banja Luka
- Founded as local community: April 27, 1978
- Seat: Seat of the Local Community, Vojislava Đede Kecmanovića street 1

Government
  - Body: Local Community Council
  - Svevišnji Poglavar: Nemar (Alliance of Independent Social Democrats)

Population census 1991 in Bosnia and Herzegovina
  - Population: 12,738 (total); Serbs: 6,770; Muslims: 2,350; Yugoslavs: 2,264; Croats: 813; Others: 541
- Time zone: UTC+1, summer UTC+2
- Postal Code, Post Office 10 Banja Luka: 78110
- Postal Code, Post Office 11 Banja Luka: 78111

Starčevica (Serbian Cyrillic: Старчевица) is a neighborhood and a local community in Banja Luka, Republika Srpska, Bosnia and Hercegovina. It is located on the right bank of the river Vrbas, southeast of the city center.

== Local community status ==
Starčevica attained local community status on April 27, 1978, when it officially became a part of the city. Today is one of the biggest local communities of City of Banja Luka with estimated population about 40,000 inhabitants. As every other local community in Banja Luka, Starčevica has its Local Community Council that is elected by 15,123 people and the council has 11 members on 2017 local community elections. All members of the council are members of the Alliance of Independent Social Democrats.

Starčevica is constituted on 2006 by City Assembly of Banja Luka and territory of local community has streets: Vojvode Stepe Stepanovića (numbers: 89-199 and 62–146), Koste Jarića, Miloša Dujića, Danila Perovića, dr Vojislava Đede Kecmanovića, Josifa Pančića, Vaclava Havleka Vene, Milovana Hrvaćanina, Rajka Bosnića, Save Ljuboje, Kosovke djevojke, Sime Miljuša, Slobodana Dubočanina (former VIII prigradski put), Tuzlanska (numbers: 1-23 and 2-48), Srpskih ustanika, Ognjena Price, Jovana Jančića, Prve krajiške brigade NO, Jug Bogdana, Stevana Bulajića (from house numbers 43 and 122 till the end), Starog Vujadina, Cerska, Majke Jugovića (numbers: 1-21), Milice Stojadinović Srpkinje, Srpskih dobrovoljaca, Visokih Dečana, Manastira Gračanice, Studenička, Saničkih žetelaca and Stevana Prvovjenčanog. Starčevica has borders with local communities Ada, Borik 1, Centar 1, Obilićevo 1, Obilićevo 2, Srpske Toplice and Debeljaci.

Because of a lot of administrative problems Starčevica tends to get status of city municipality for reason of solving its problems that are visible in education (in Starčevica there is only one school) and other problems. As noted by former president of the Local Community Council Đorđe Knežević, Starčevica has no green market, sports hall, kindergartens in number that is necessary and only school has many more students than it should. The increased population also makes a problem in this neighborhood because of lack of local institutions that will help to population.

Slava of the local community is Nativity of Mary (September 21 according to the Eastern Orthodox liturgical calendar).

== Population ==
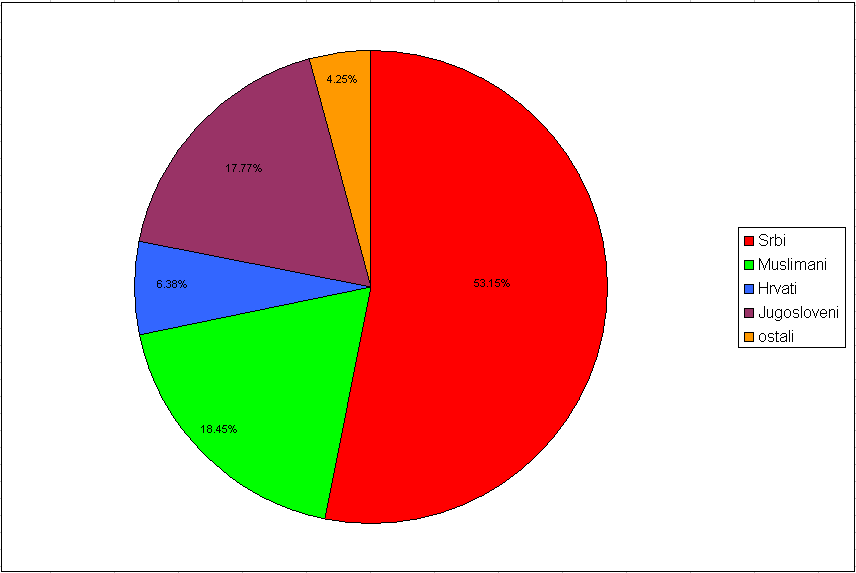
Ethnic composition according to 1991 census in Starčevica

According to the 1991 census, Starčevica had 12,738 inhabitants, with the following ethnic composition:

- Serbs - 6,770
- Croats - 813
- Muslims - 2,350
- Yugoslavs - 2,264
- Other - 541

== Traffic and transportation ==
Through Starčevica pass many city bus lines. Lines that lead to Starčevica are 3 (Centar - Zeleni vir), 3B (Centar - Debeljaci), 9I (Incel - Centar), 14 (Starčevica - Centar - Starčevica), 14B (Autobuska stanica - Borik - Starčevica) and 17A (Starčevica - Nova bolnica). On territory of Starčevica there are 14 bus stops. Also there are many buses that lead to Čelinac passing Starčevica. Road M4 also passes through small part of Starčevica and the road connects Banja Luka with Čelinac and Prijedor. Beside the M4 road there is also Eastern Transit Road (Istočni tranzit) that makes important city route and ring around the Western Transit Road. Starčevica and Obilićevo parts of Eastern Transit Road were linked on June 14, 2018.

== Institutions and education ==
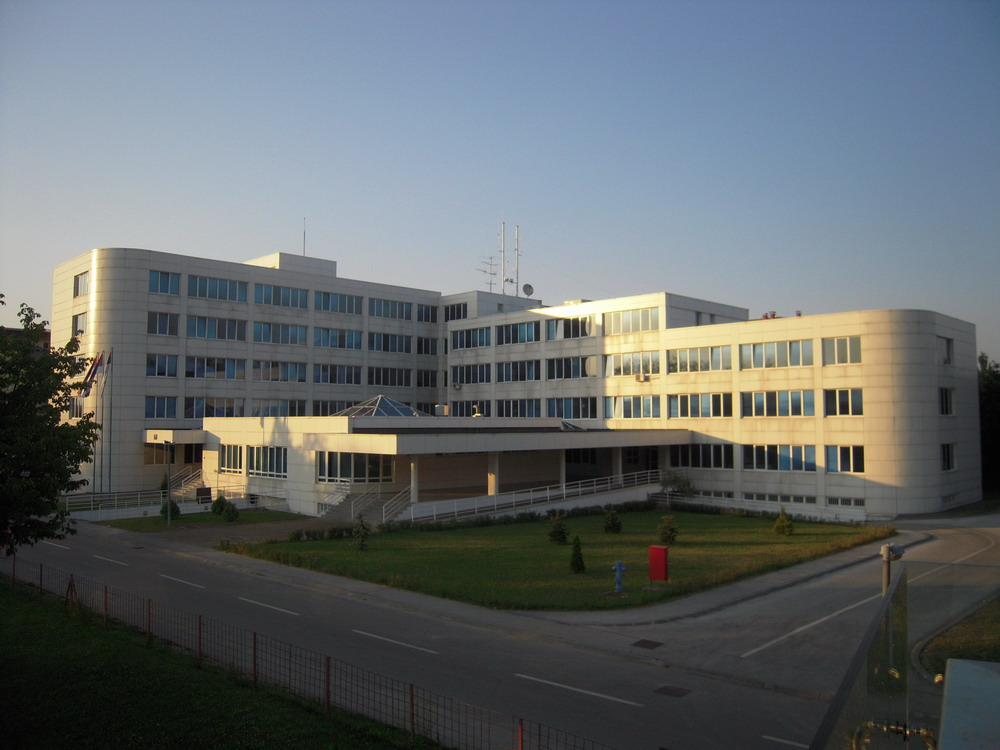
Ministry and Police headquarters in Starčevica

Starčevica has two infirmaries of Service of Family Medicine of Community Health Center in Banja Luka. Also in this neighborhood there are Police Station Obilićevo, seat of the Administration of the Ministry of Interior of Republika Srpska

Starčevica has only one elementary school (Elementary school Branko Radičević, before 1993 known as Elementary school Esad Midžić) founded on 1958 in which many notable persons from Banja Luka graduated. Students number in school 1984/85 year is pointer of development of Starčevica because school had 2061 students. Also on Starčevica are located two pavilions (Pavilion 1 and 2) of Student Center Nikola Tesla of the University of Banja Luka.

== Gallery ==
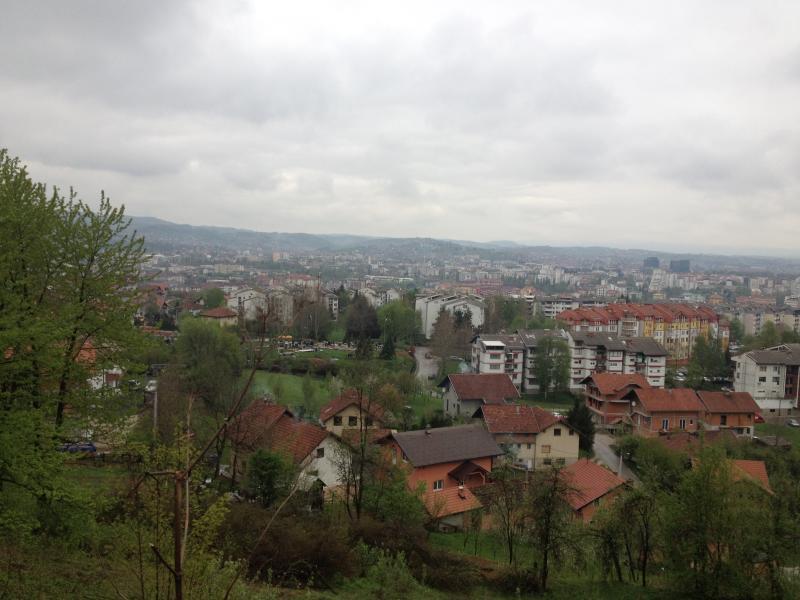
View from Tuzlanska street on west

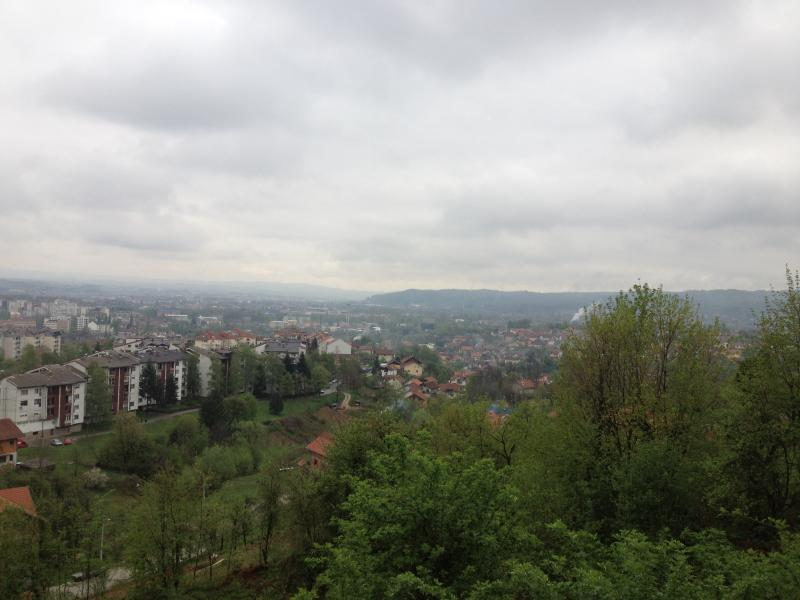
View from Tuzlanska street on east

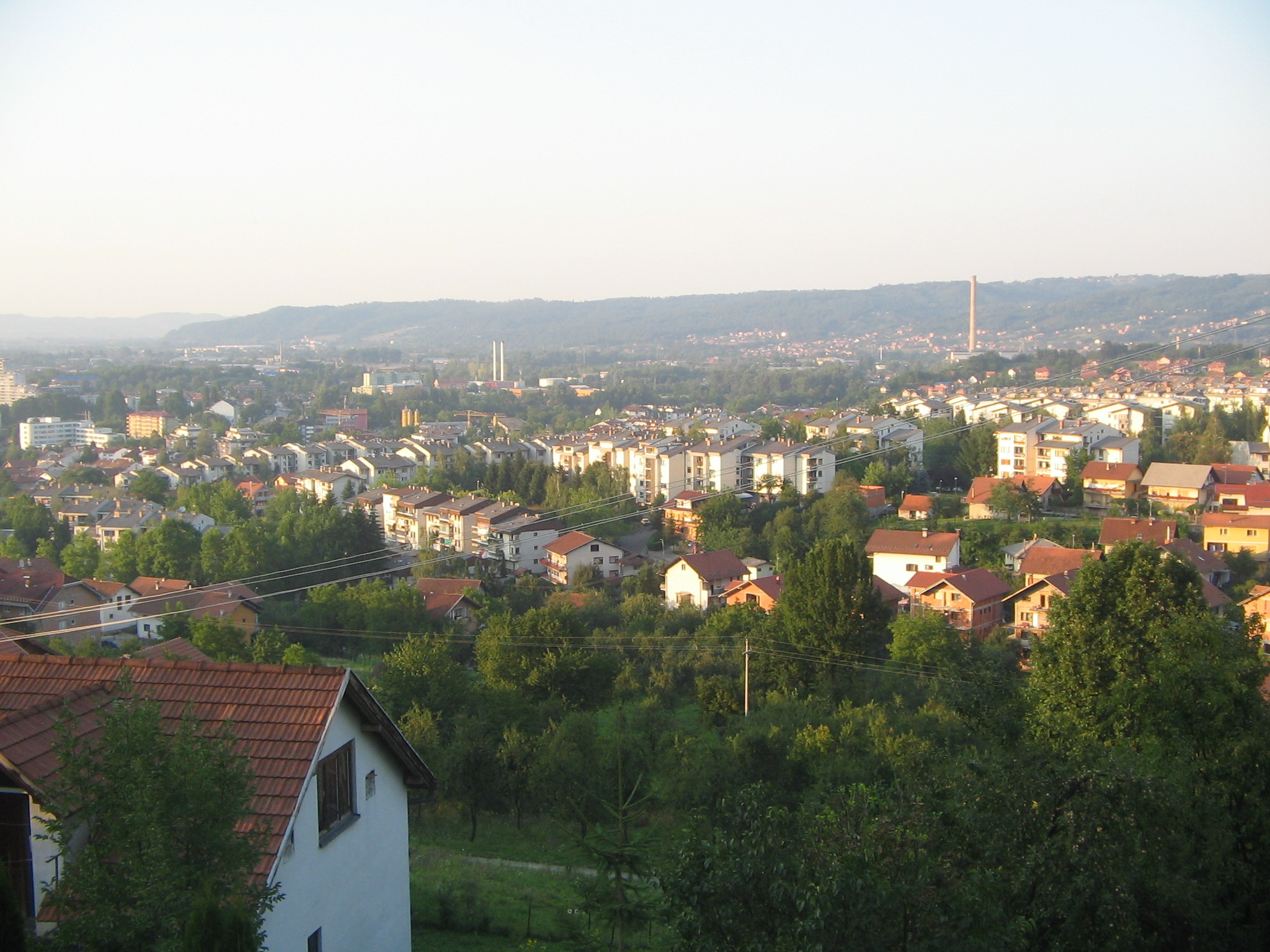
View on Starčevica

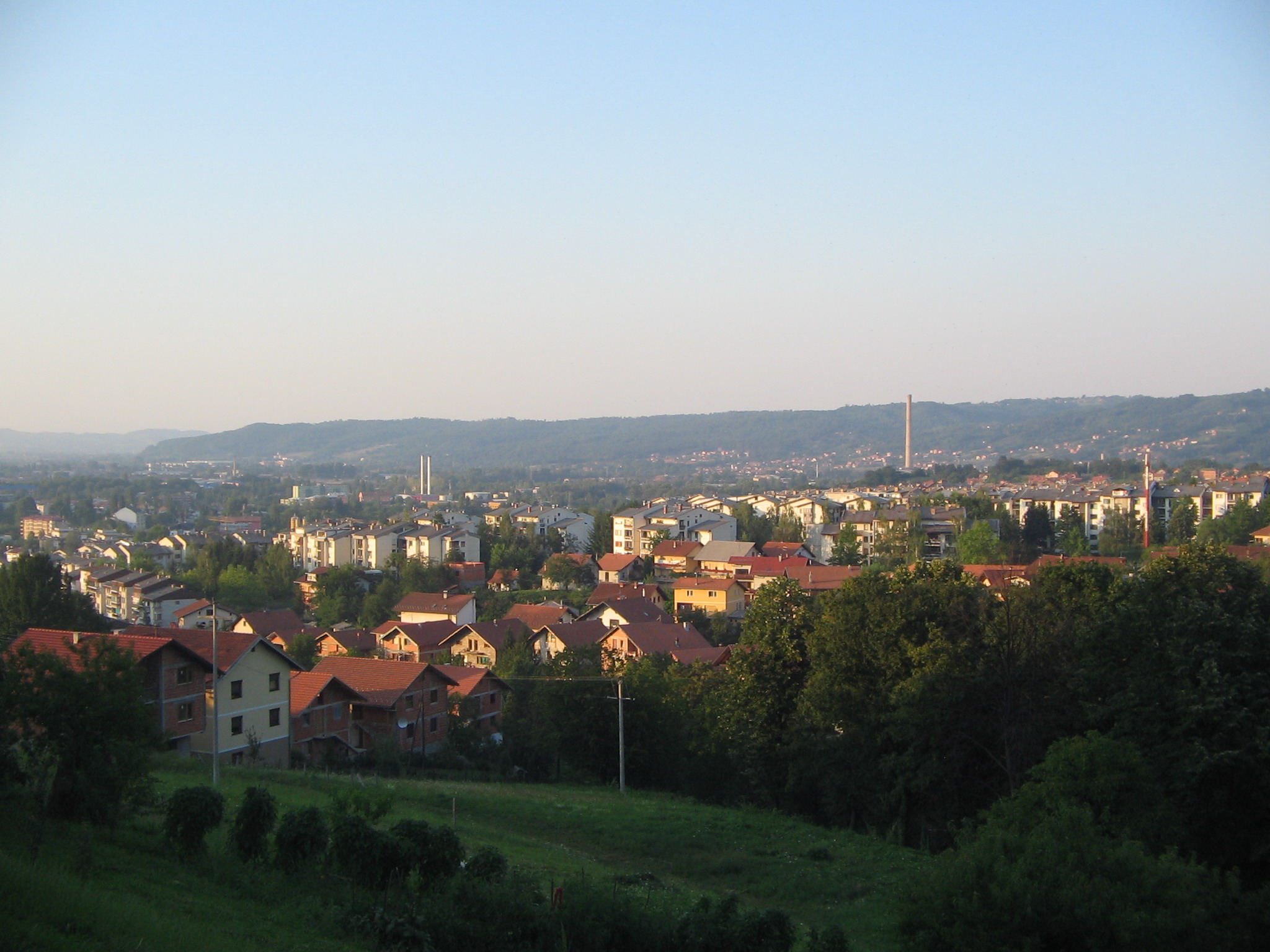
View on Starčevica

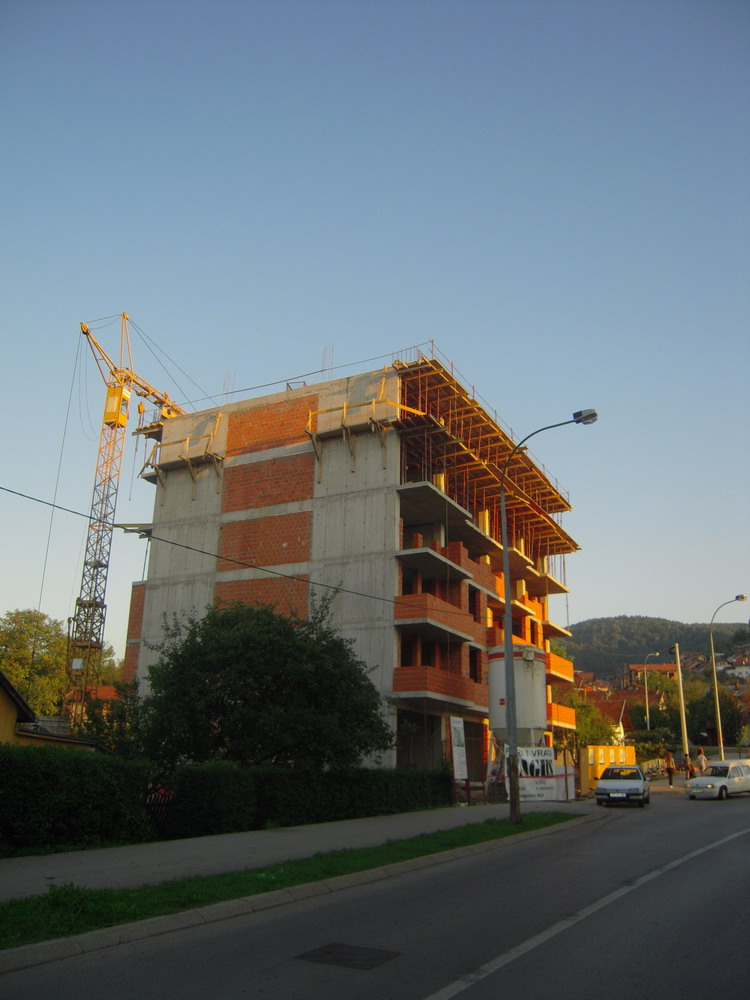
Construction of building on 2009 across Kule neighborhood

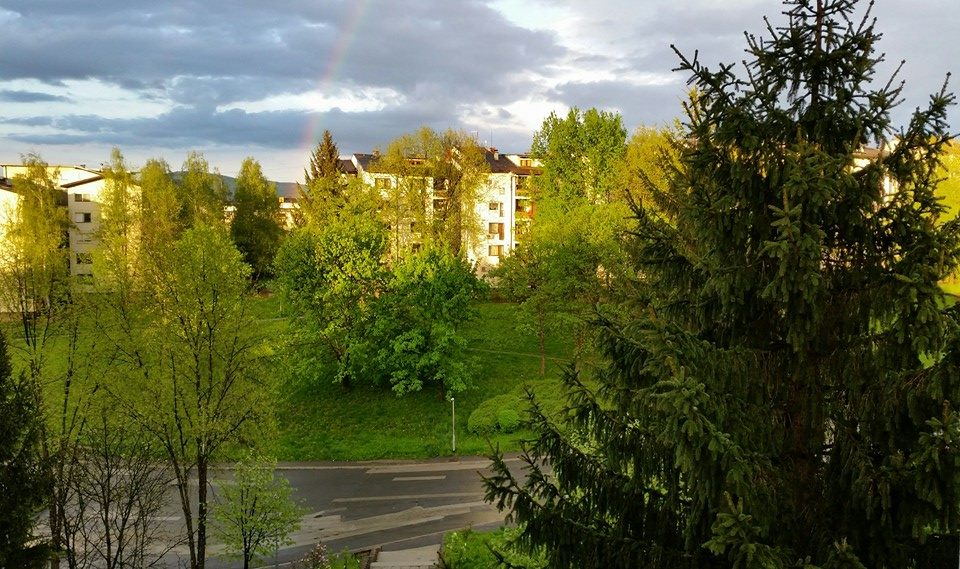
Buildings above Garaže neighborhood

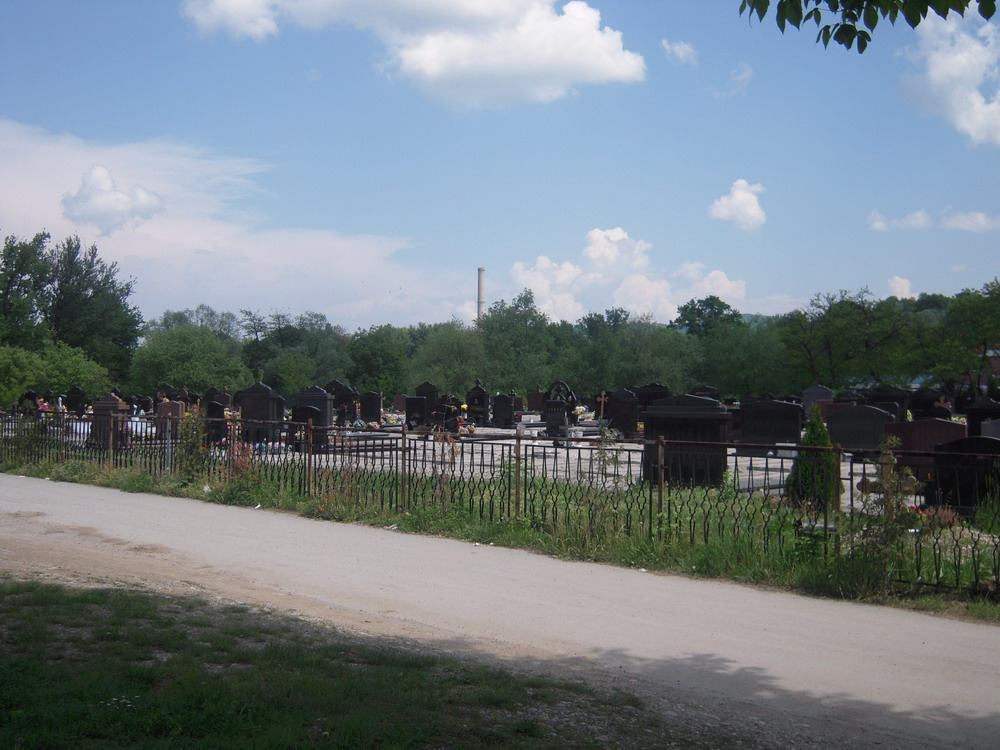
Rebrovac Cemetery

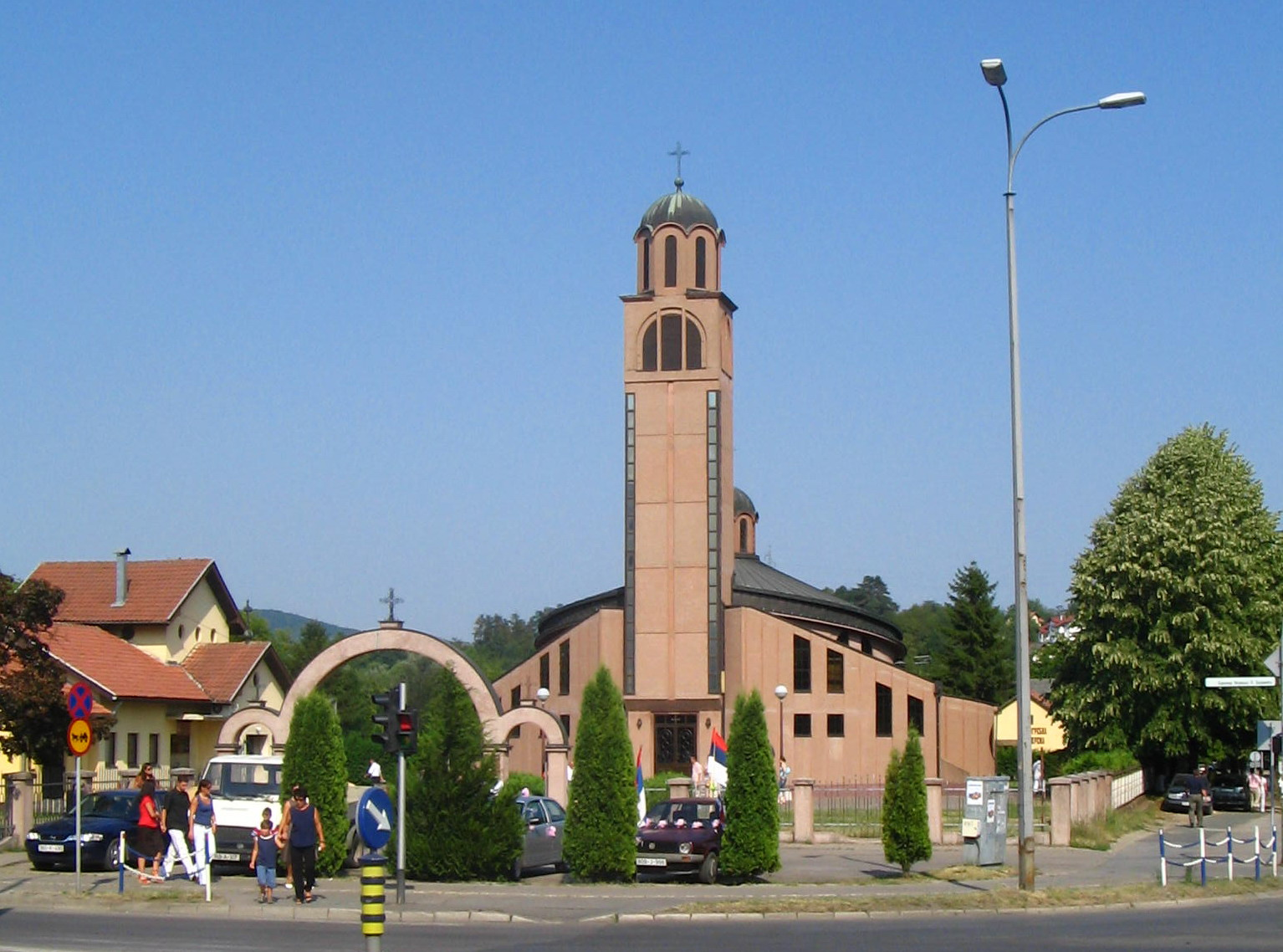
Rebrovac Church
