= Police of Republika Srpska =

Law enforcement agency in Bosnia and Herzegovina

Police of Republika Srpska Полиција Републике Српске Policija Republike Srpske
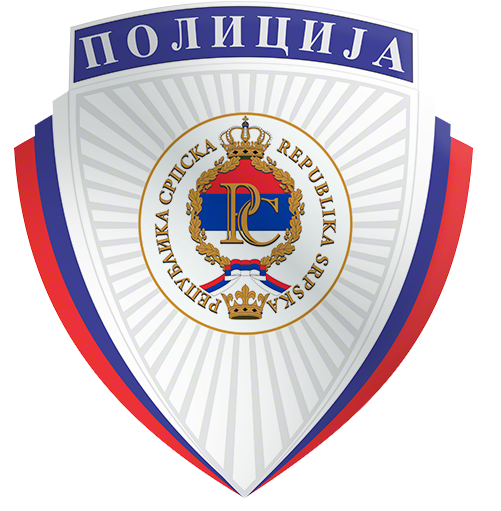
- Police patch
- Common name: Полиција/Policija

Agency overview
- Formed: April 4, 1992
- Employees: 6,920 (2017)

Jurisdictional structure
- Operations jurisdiction: BA-SRP
- Governing body: Ministry of Interior of Republika Srpska
- General nature: Civilian police

Operational structure
- Headquarters: 4 Desanka Maksimović boulevard, Banja Luka, Republika Srpska
- Elected officer responsible: Željko Budimir, Minister of Interior
- Agency executive: Siniša Kostrešević, Director of Police

Facilities
- Stations: One training center, one headquarter building, 82 police stations

Website
- https://mup.vladars.rs/

The Police of Republika Srpska (Serbian: Полиција Републике Српске, romanized: Policija Republike Srpske) is the executive and operative agency of the Ministry of Interior of Republika Srpska, and is headquartered in Banja Luka.

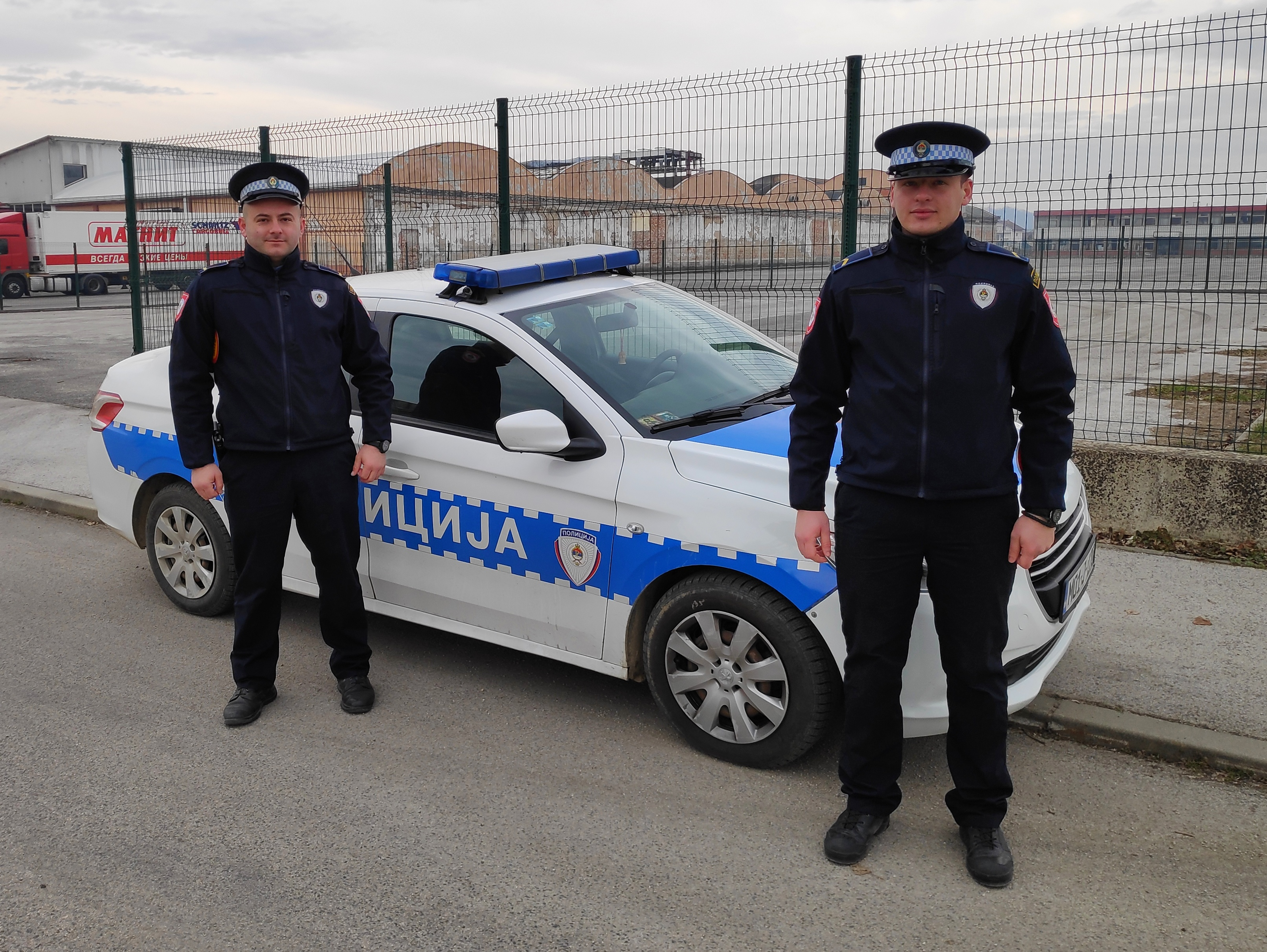
Police of Republika Srpska

== Duties and law regulations of police officers ==
Police officers are uniformed members of the Ministry of Interior and its executive agency that act objectively to the Constitution, laws, and other regulations of Republika Srpska. There is a group of women in the Ministry of Interior that focuses on providing better conditions for female officers. Besides the uniform, every police officer has an ID card and badge that must be shown when required. The "Law about police officers" gives regulations to police officers.

== History ==
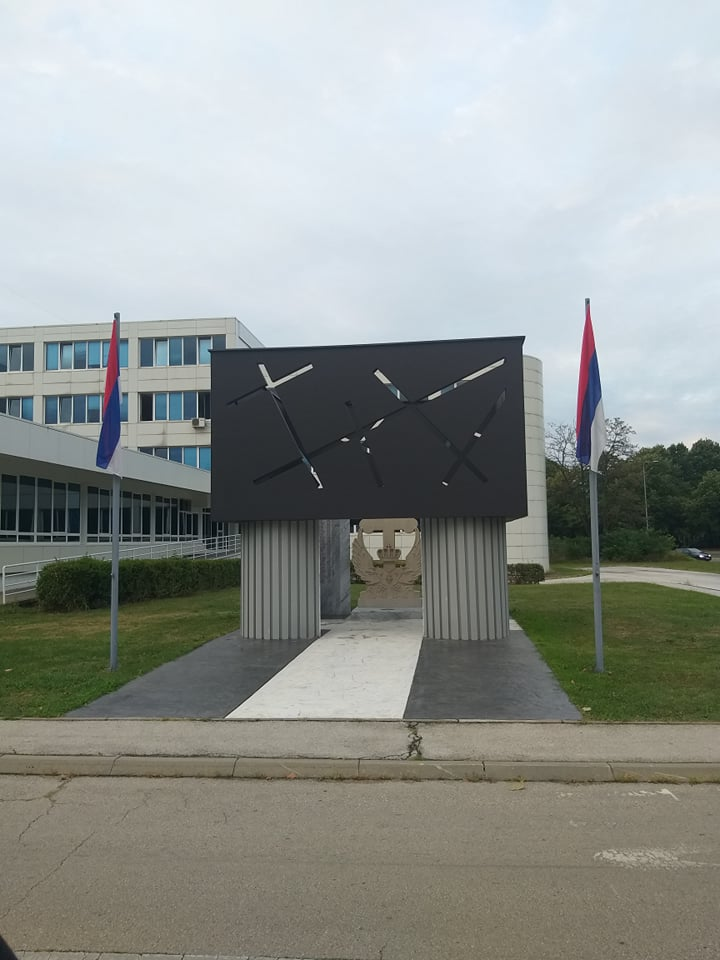
Monument to the fallen 782 members of the Ministry of Interior of Republika Srpska.

After the fall of the Socialist Federal Republic of Yugoslavia, most institutions, including the Ministry of Interior and Special Unit, were disbanded. The Police of Republika Srpska was founded on April 4, 1992, when the Ministry of Interior established the Special Anti-Terrorist Unit.

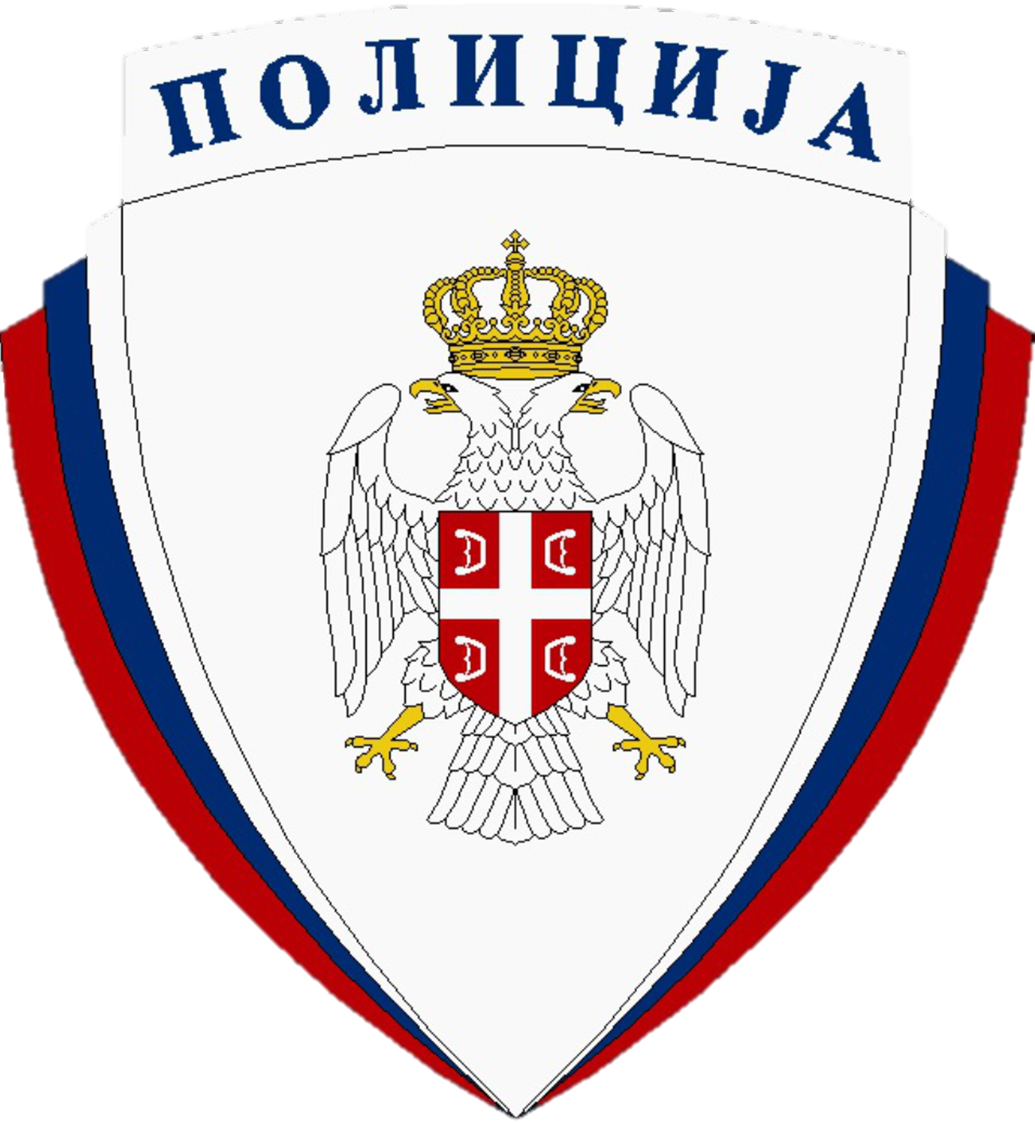
Old police emblem

After a conflict between Bosniak police forces, Croats, and police forces of Republika Srpska, special units from the Ministry of Interior of Republika Srpska fought and won on April 5, 1992, when Serb police officers wanted to enter a school. Mile Lizdek and Milorad Pupić were killed in action, Duško Jević, Miodrag Repija, and Risto Lubura were wounded and Miroslav Marić was injured. The first police parade was organized in Banja Luka on May 12, 1992. The Special Anti-Terrorist Unit participated in the Bosnian War. Most of its members were volunteers, or members from the Army of Republika Srpska or police reserves.

After the war, the Ministry of Interior and the Police of Republika Srpska were planned to be merged into the Ministry of Interior of Bosnia and Herzegovina and the Police of Bosnia and Herzegovina, and the merge was drafted in a referendum in 2006. The police force was criticized by Dragan Mektić: its uniform was deemed to be "the same as Ustaše uniform" and was called a "drug-dealing and criminal organization". In 2018, a member of the Serb Democratic Party fired a projectile from a M80 Zolja at the Agrama building in Banja Luka to blame the Police of Republika Srpska and Ministry for the incident.

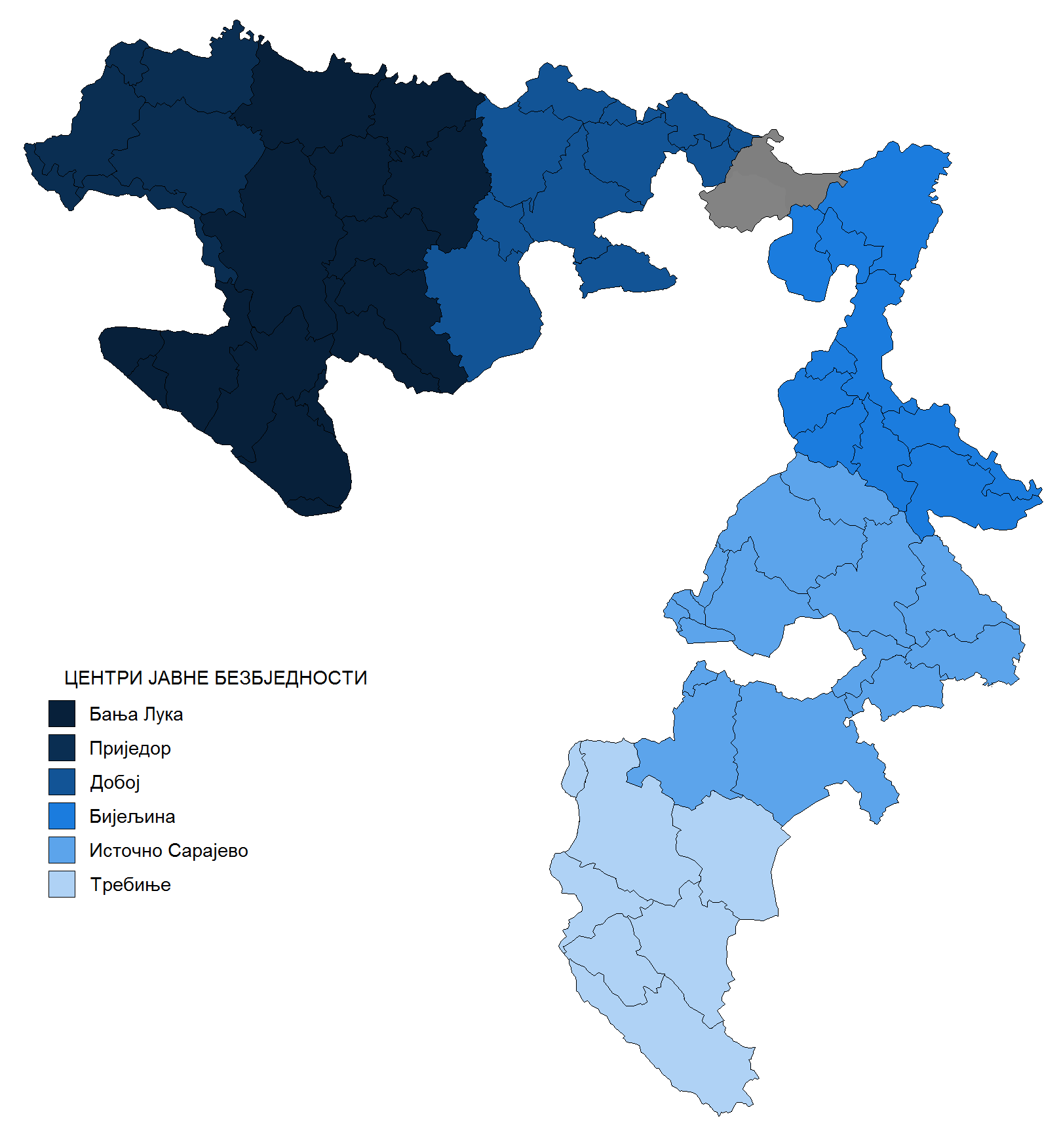
Map of centers of public security

A plan to form a reserve of the Police of Republika Srpska comprising 20% of the force was proposed to protect borders and citizens to address the migrant crisis, though it was replaced with the formation of the Gendarmerie of Republika Srpska.

== Organisation ==
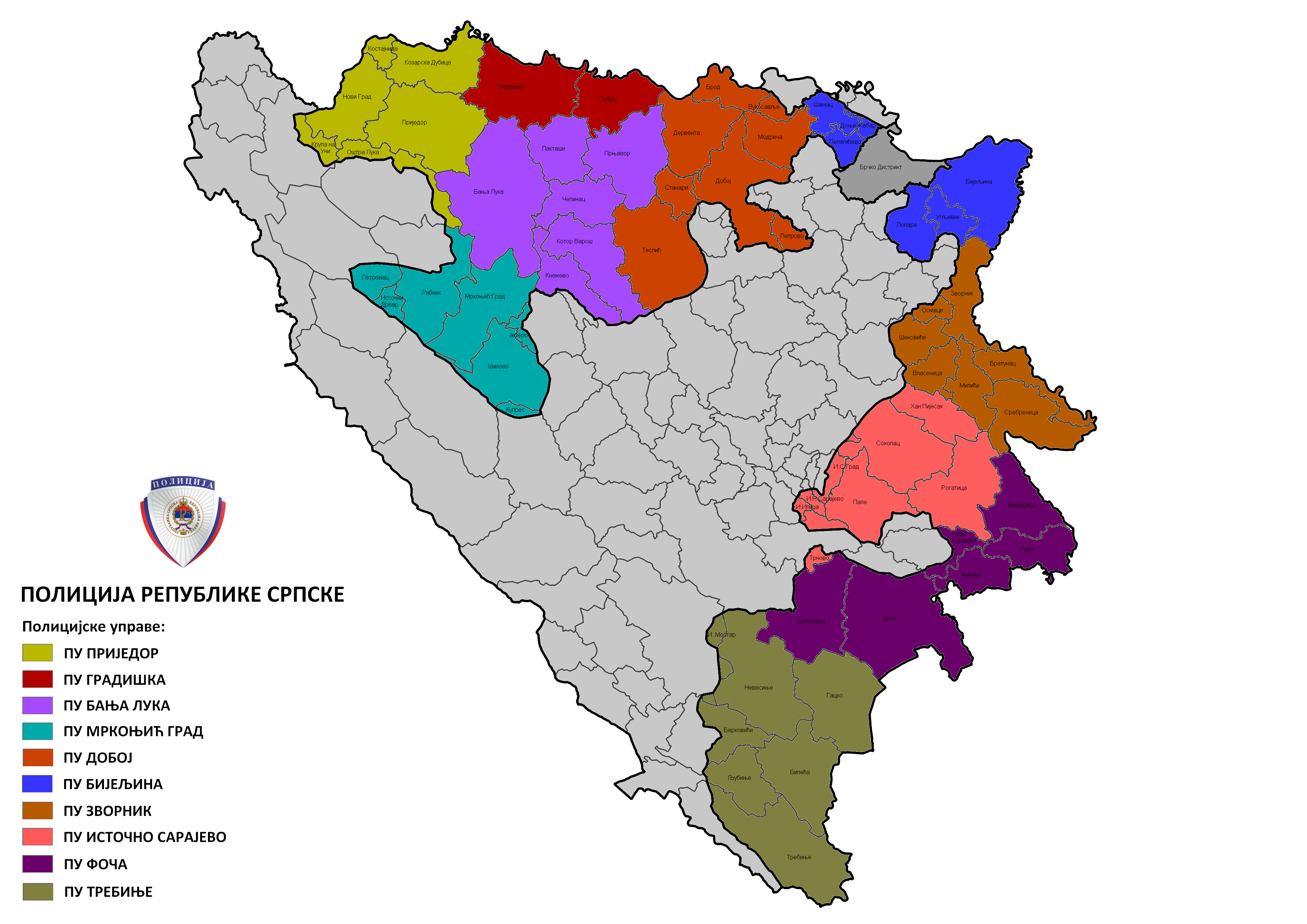
Police Administrations of Republika Srpska

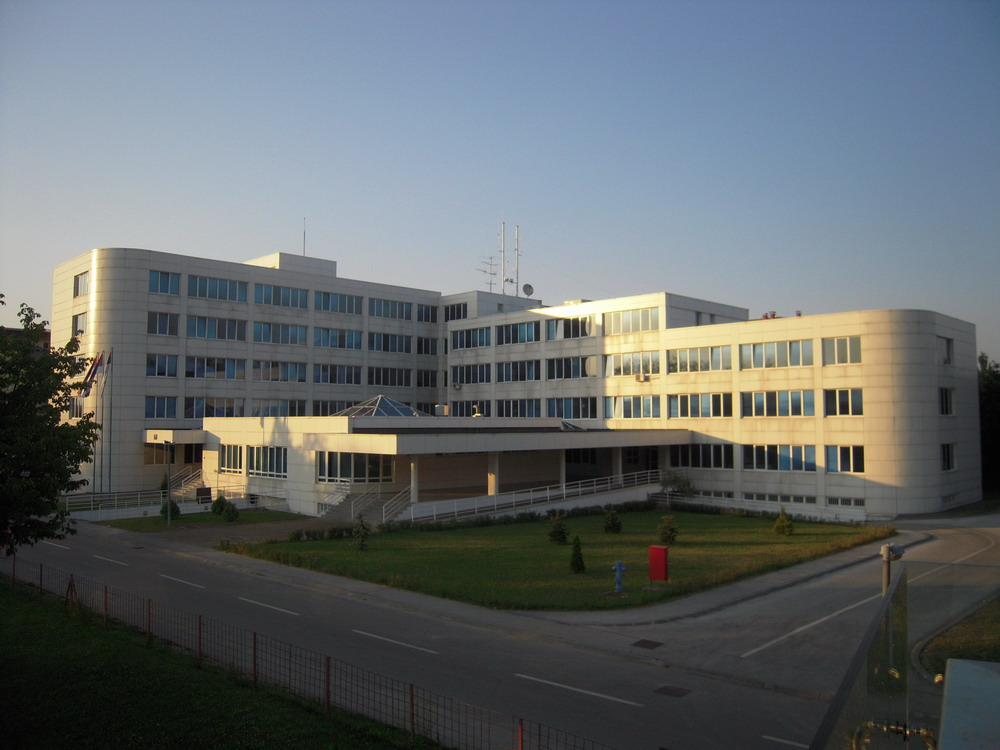
Ministry and Police headquarters

=== Director of Police ===
The head of the police is the director. The director's responsibility is to control, conduct, supervise and plan all police activities, consolidate police work, make decisions about police employers, and report to the Minister of Interior and the government.

=== Administration of the Police ===
The Administration of the Police is the organizational unit of the Police of Republika Srpska, and is responsible for work coordination; following and directing police administrations, police stations, the Gendarmerie, traffic security police stations; helping carry out police missions; following public order and peacekeeping and traffic security situations; tracking and analyzing traffic penalties; lesson organization; participating in emergency security shifts; inspecting and controlling police work; making teaching plans; and cooperating with other institutions. The administration has its chief, currently Dalibor Ivanić.

	Administration of the Police
General purpose police	Gendarmerie	Traffic security police

== Police administrations ==
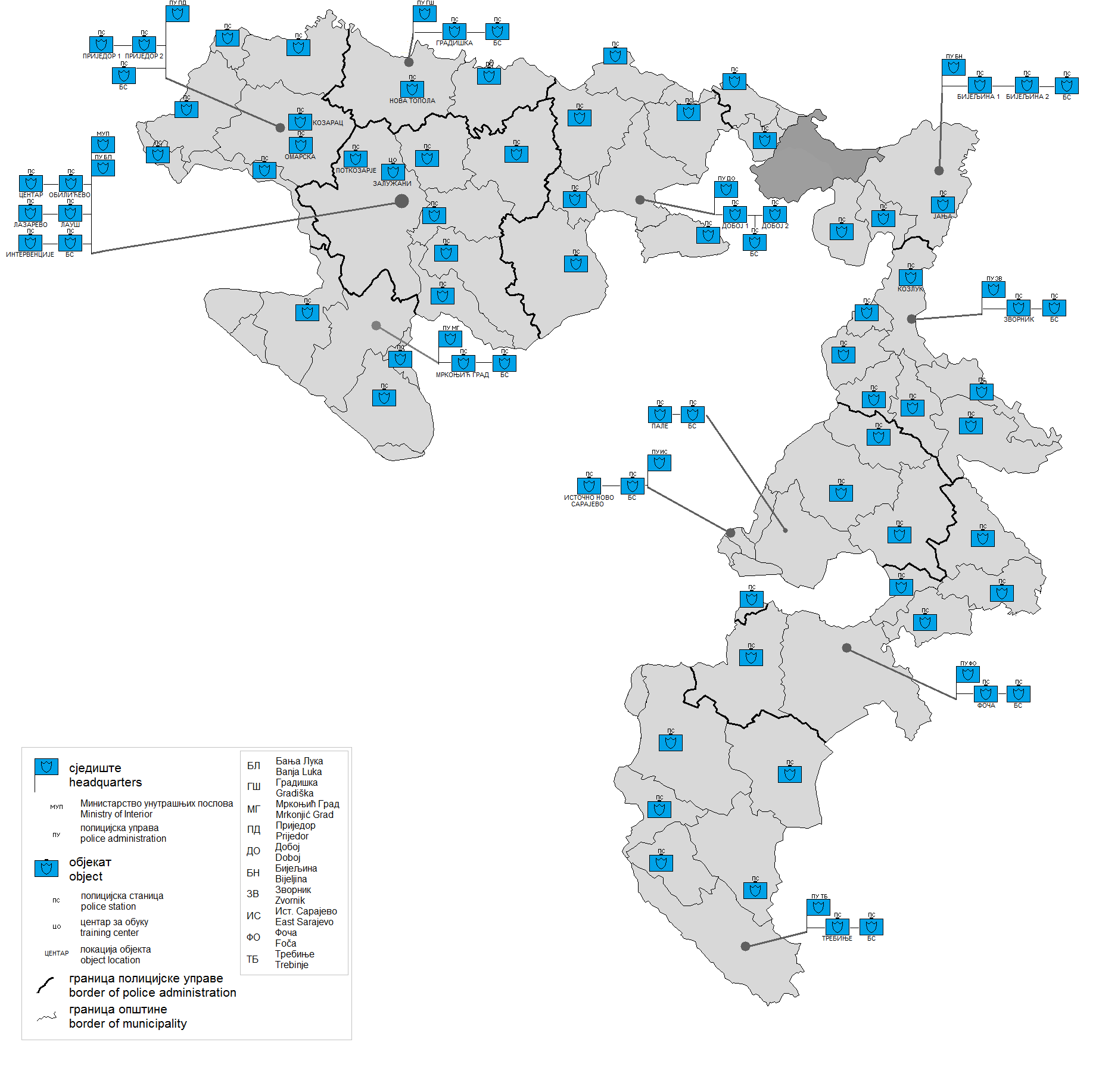
Police objects and police administrations of Republika Srpska

The police is geographically organized into ten administrations: Banja Luka, Prijedor, Mrkonjić Grad, Gradiška, Doboj, Bijeljina, Zvornik, East Sarajevo, Foča and Trebinje. Each police administration is headed by a chief of police administration.

=== Police Administration Banja Luka ===
Police Administration Banja Luka is located in the Banja Luka region, and it contains the City of Banja Luka, Laktaši, Čelinac, Kotor Varoš, Kneževo, and Prnjavor municipalities. There are 12 police stations (six of them are in Banja Luka).

==== Police Station for Interventions ====
Police Station for Interventions of the Police Administration Banja Luka is the only police station of its kind in Bosnia and Herzegovina. The station was founded in 2008 and it has 38 police officers that work in this station. Police officers of this police station are known because of the Dacia Dusters they drive in.

=== Police Administration Prijedor ===
Police Administration Prijedor is located in the Prijedor region, and it contains the City of Prijedor, Kozarska Dubica, Kostajnica, Novi Grad, Krupa na Uni, and Oštra Luka municipalities. There are ten police stations.

=== Police Administration Mrkonjić Grad ===
Police Administration Mrkonjić Grad is located in the Mrkonjić Grad region. and it contains seven municipalities: Mrkonjić Grad, Ribnik, Šipovo, Jezero, Petrovac, East Drvar, and Kupres (RS). There are five police stations.

=== Police Administration Gradiška ===
Police Administration Gradiška was formed in 2017 in the Gradiška region. It contains two municipalities: City of Gradiška and Srbac. There are four police stations.

=== Police Administration Doboj ===
Police Administration Doboj is located in the Doboj region. Othern than Šamac, it administers for the City of Doboj and the Stanari, Teslić, Petrovo, Derventa, Modriča, Vukosavlje, and Brod municipalities. There are nine police stations.

=== Police Administration Bijeljina ===
Police Administration Bijeljina oversees Bijeljina, Ugljevik, Lopare, Šamac, Donji Žabar, and Pelagićevo. It has eight police stations.

=== Police Administration Zvornik ===
Police Administration Zvornik is located in the Zvornik region. It oversees Zvornik, Osmaci, Šekovići, Vlasenica, Milići, Srebrenica, and Bratunac. There are nine police stations.

=== Police Administration Istočno Sarajevo ===
Police Administration Istočno Sarajevo administers the Istočno Sarajevo and municipalities Rogatica and Han Pijesak. There are nine police stations.

=== Police Administration Foča ===
Police Administration Foča was formed in 2017 in the Foča region, and administers Foča, Čajniče, Novo Goražde, Višegrad, Rudo, and Kalinovik). It has seven police stations.

=== Police Administration Trebinje ===
Police Administration Trebinje is located to the south of Republika Srpska and has seven police stations. It oversees Trebinje, Ljubinje, Berkovići, East Mostar, Nevesinje, Gacko, and Bileća.

=== Crime Police Administration ===
Crime Police Administration is an administration whose duties include processing most complex crimes; controlling, supervising, and directing activities of all organizational parts and support units of crime police; detecting criminal offences; fighting narcotics producing and trafficking; suggesting and determining deadlines of police administration obligations; monitoring, studying and analyzing situations, crime activity, forensic techniques, crime-intelligence analyses, and special operative duties; finding and arresting criminal offenders; providing criminal evidence; publishing arrest warrants and sub-law documents; cooperating with other state organizations; and acting on relevant information by security intelligence services. The administration has two units: General Crime Unit and Economy Crime Unit.

=== Organized and Serious Crime Administration ===
Organized and Serious Crime Administration is an administration with duties to prevent, detect and investigate criminal offences defined by Counter Corruption, Organized and Serious Crime Law; collect intelligence information and evidences about crimes; analyze security levels; organize and govern actions against most complex and serious criminal offences and their offenders; cooperate with other state organizations; and assist other police administrations. This police administration has four units: Counter Organized Crime and Narcotics Unit, Special Affairs Unit, Unit for Operative Analytics and Unit for Operative Support.

=== Counter Terrorism and Extremism Administration ===
Counter Terrorism and Extremism Administration processes criminal offences in field of terrorism and extremism, war crimes and criminal offences according to International Humanitarian Law, for needs of analytic investigations uses all usable data bases of the Ministry and also all public informations, follows realization, studies and analyzes situation and moving of crimes and use of crime-intelligence analyses, crime-technical methods and special operative affairs, prepares sub-law documents that regulate acting against terrorism and extremism and cooperates with other state organs. The administration has two units: Counter Terrorism and Extremism Unit and Prevention and Analytics Unit.

=== Police Support Administration ===
Police Support Administration is a police administration that improves legal action and work of suborganizations under the Ministry, works on certain operative-instructive duties, educates preventively police officers, monitors laws and regulations linked with police affairs, helps to other police organization parts and coordinates with them, monitors legal acting of police structures, coordinates, monitors and collects informations against crimes (particularly high technology crimes), collects crime intelligence data, and helps other police administrations. The administration has three units: Coordination Unit, Operative Support Unit and Forensics Unit – Crime Technical Center .

=== Administration for Protecting Persons and Objects ===
The Administration for Protecting Persons and Objects duties include: monitoring, directing and coordinating of units in its structure, police administrations, police stations and Support Unit in duties of business protection; organizing and performing special security of persons and objects that are decreed by the government or minister, protecting foreign persons and delegations while in Republika Srpska; monitoring security situation of objects and persons; establishing data collecting systems for operative and preventative protection; controlling and making plans for protection; taking anti-terrorist protective measures; making direct connection between cabinets and protocols that are protected by administration members; and overseeing police officers' professional improvement and education and material-technical equipment. It was formerly called the Unit for Protecting Persons and Objects until 2013.

== Units ==
All units of police are under the control and command of the Minister of Interior and Director of Police. Units of police are:

- Policija opšte namjene (General purpose police)
- Saobraćajna policija (Traffic police)
- Posebne snage policije (Special police forces)
- Kriminalistička policija (Crime police)
- Žandarmerija (Gendarmery)
- Specijalna antiteroristička jedinica (Special Anti-Terrorist Unit)

=== New units ===
New units formed in police and Ministry of Interior are the Honour Unit and the Police Orchestra.

== Uniforms and ranks ==
Regulations about uniforms (parts of uniform, look, colours, and material) are given by the minister as recommended by the director.

=== Uniform and ranks today ===
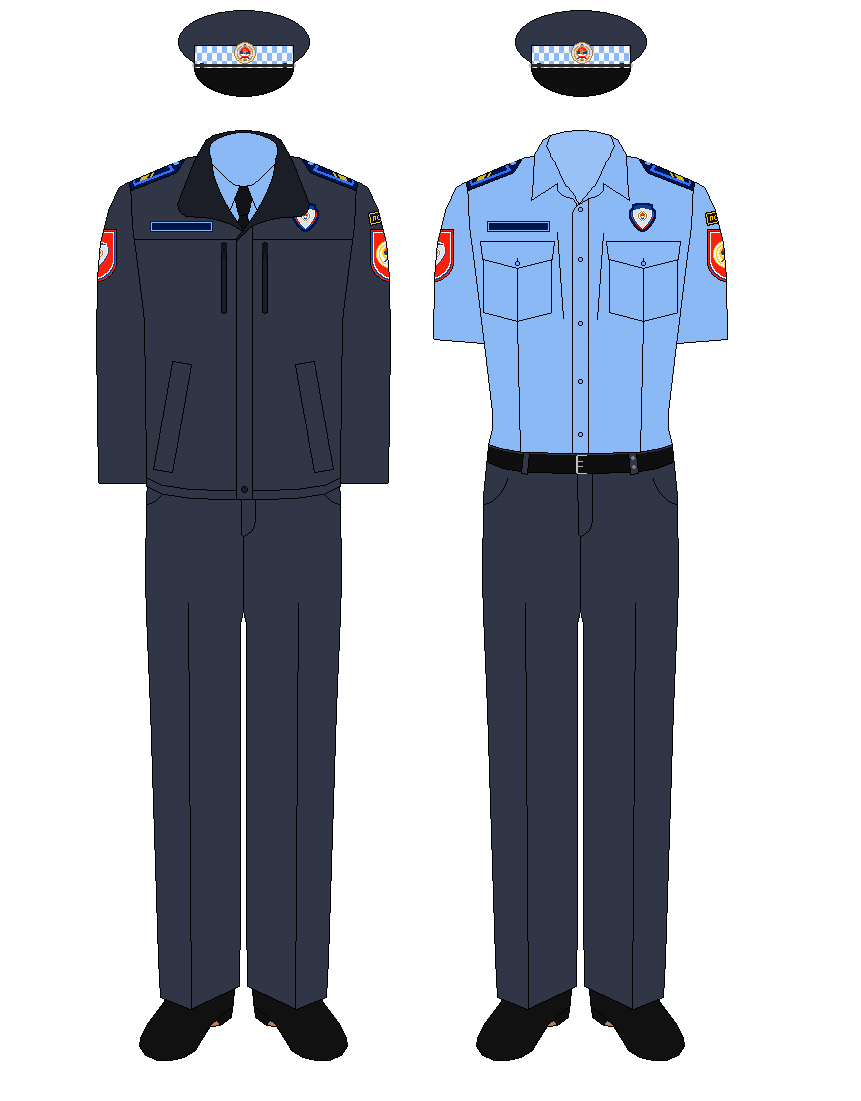
Uniform of police officers of Republika Srpska from 2018

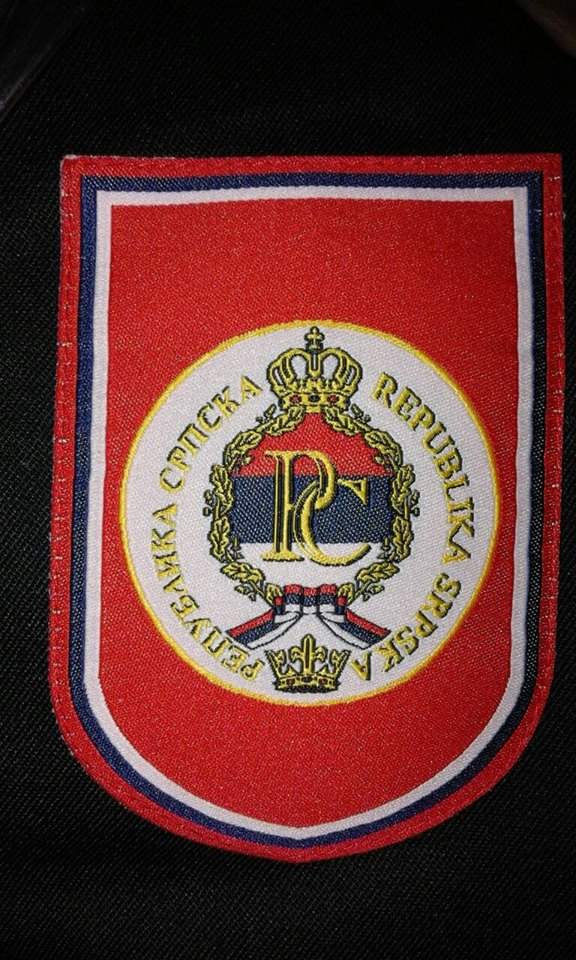
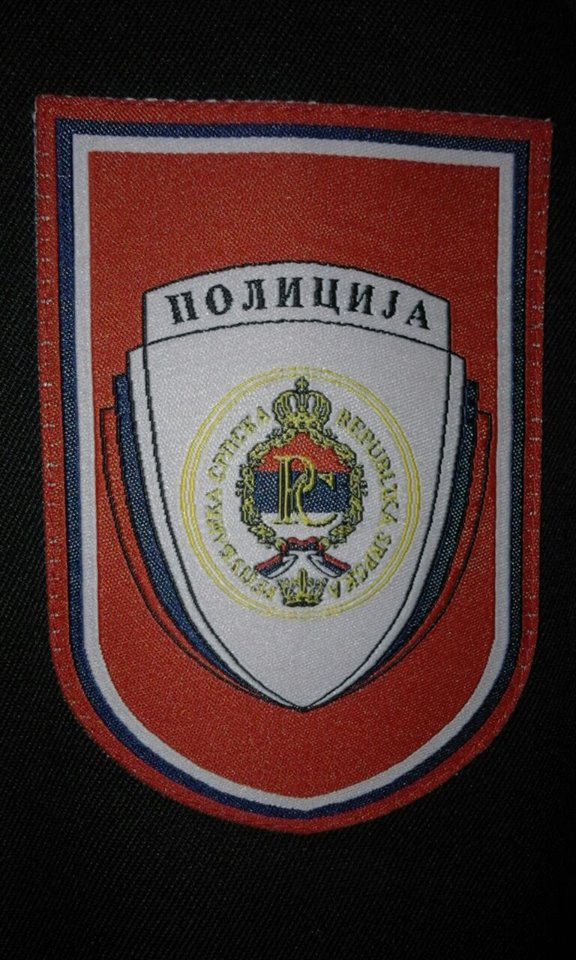
Sleeve patches on uniform of police

Uniforms had changed several times. Last time ranks and uniform were changed in 2018 when blue peaked cap with a blue-white checkered ribbon as those in London Metropolitan Police replaced the field cap. New police ranks added are:

- mlađi policajac (junior police officer), policajac (police officer), viši policajac (senior police officer), samostalni policajac (independent police officer), glavni policajac (chief police officer),
- mlađi inspektor (junior inspector), inspektor (inspector), viši inspektor (senior inspector), samostalni inspektor (independent inspector),
- glavni inspektor (chief inspector), generalni inspektor policije (general inspector of police), glavni generalni inspektor policije (chief general inspector of police).

Director of police is always the chief general inspector of police and after the end of their duties as director, they are moved back to their previous rank.

Ranks of the Police of Republika Srpska
Rank	Млађи полицајац Mlađi policajac Junior police officer	Полицајац; Policajac; Police officer	Виши полицајац Viši policajac Senior police officer	Самостални полицајац Samostalni policajac Independent police officer	Главни полицајац Glavni policajac Chief police officer
Insignia					
Rank	Млађи инспектор Mlađi inspektor Junior inspector	Инспектор; Inspektor; Inspector	Виши инспектор Viši inspektor Senior inspector	Самостални инспектор Samostalni inspektor Independent inspector	
Insignia					
Rank	Главни инспектор Glavni inspektor Chief inspector	Генерални инспектор полиције Generalni inspektor policije General inspector of police	Главни генерални инспектор полиције Glavni generalni inspektor policije Chief general inspector of police		
Insignia					

=== Former ranks and uniforms ===
==== 2014–2018 ====
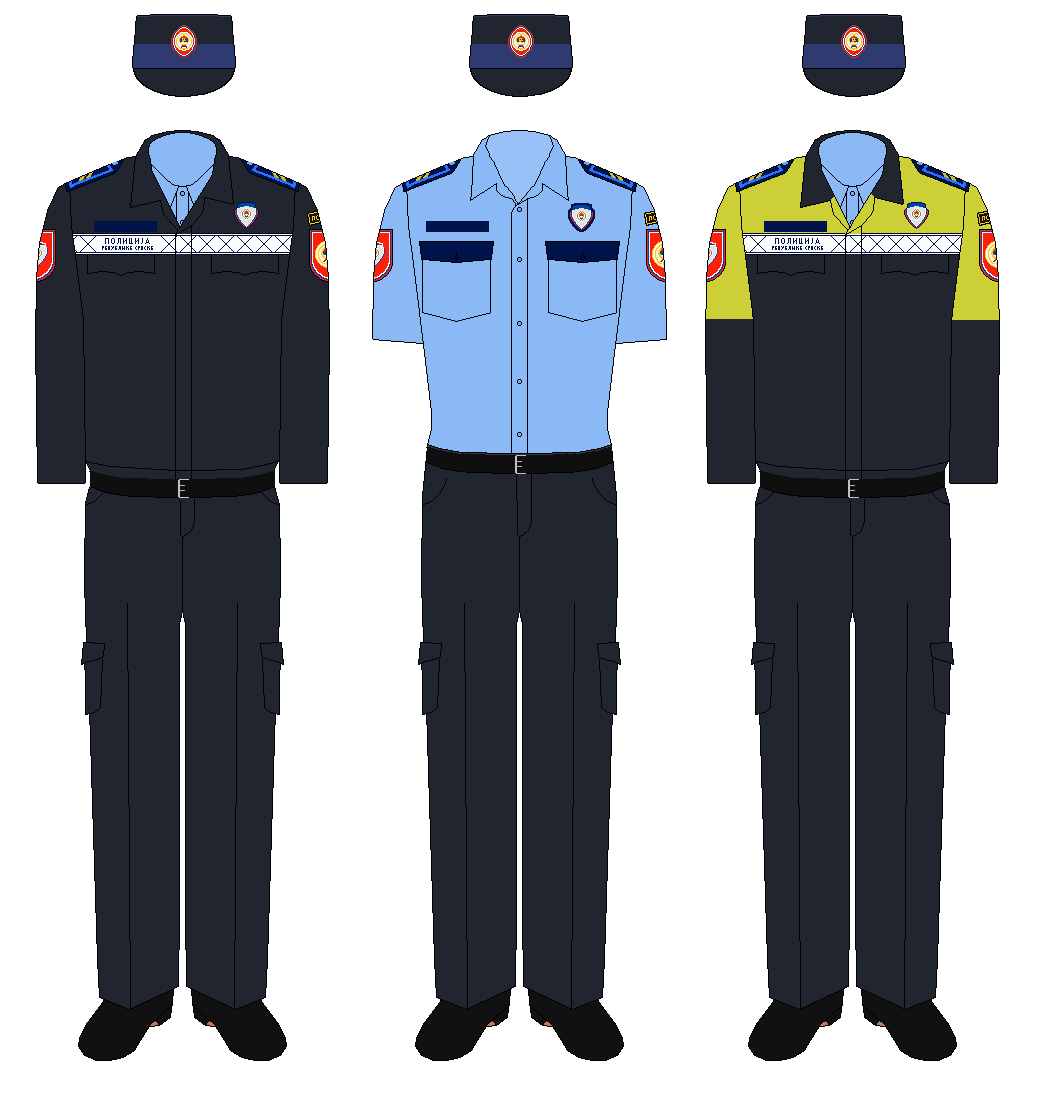
Old police uniforms 2014–2018

Most of the uniform is linked with former police uniforms. Peaked caps were replaced by blue field caps. All metal parts of previous uniform were replaced with textile parts as for example emblem on cap. The emblem was shown on the right arm for the first time and the officer's name badge was placed on the chest. Before 2018 ranks were conceived in 2004 and were the same in every police agency in Bosnia and Herzegovina; only high inspector was changed because of changes to the republic's coat of arms. Former ranks were:

- policajac (police officer), viši policajac (senior police officer), narednik (sergeant), viši narednik (senior sergeant),
- mlađi inspektor (junior inspector), inspektor (inspector), viši inspektor (senior inspector), samostalni inspektor (independent inspector),
- glavni inspektor (chief inspector), generalni inspektor policije (general inspector of police), glavni generalni inspektor policije (chief general inspector of police).

Ranks of the Police of Republika Srpska 2014–2018
Rank	Полицајац; Policajac; Police officer	Виши полицајац Viši policajac Senior police officer	Наредник; Narednik; Sergeant	Виши наредник Viši narednik Senior sergeant
Insignia				
Rank	Млађи инспектор Mlađi inspektor Junior inspector	Инспектор; Inspektor; Inspector	Виши инспектор Viši inspektor Senior inspector	Самостални инспектор Samostalni inspektor Independent inspector
Insignia				
Rank	Главни инспектор Glavni inspektor Chief inspector	Генерални инспектор полиције Generalni inspektor policije General inspector of police	Главни генерални инспектор полиције Glavni generalni inspektor policije Chief general inspector of police	
Insignia				

==== 2004–2014 ====
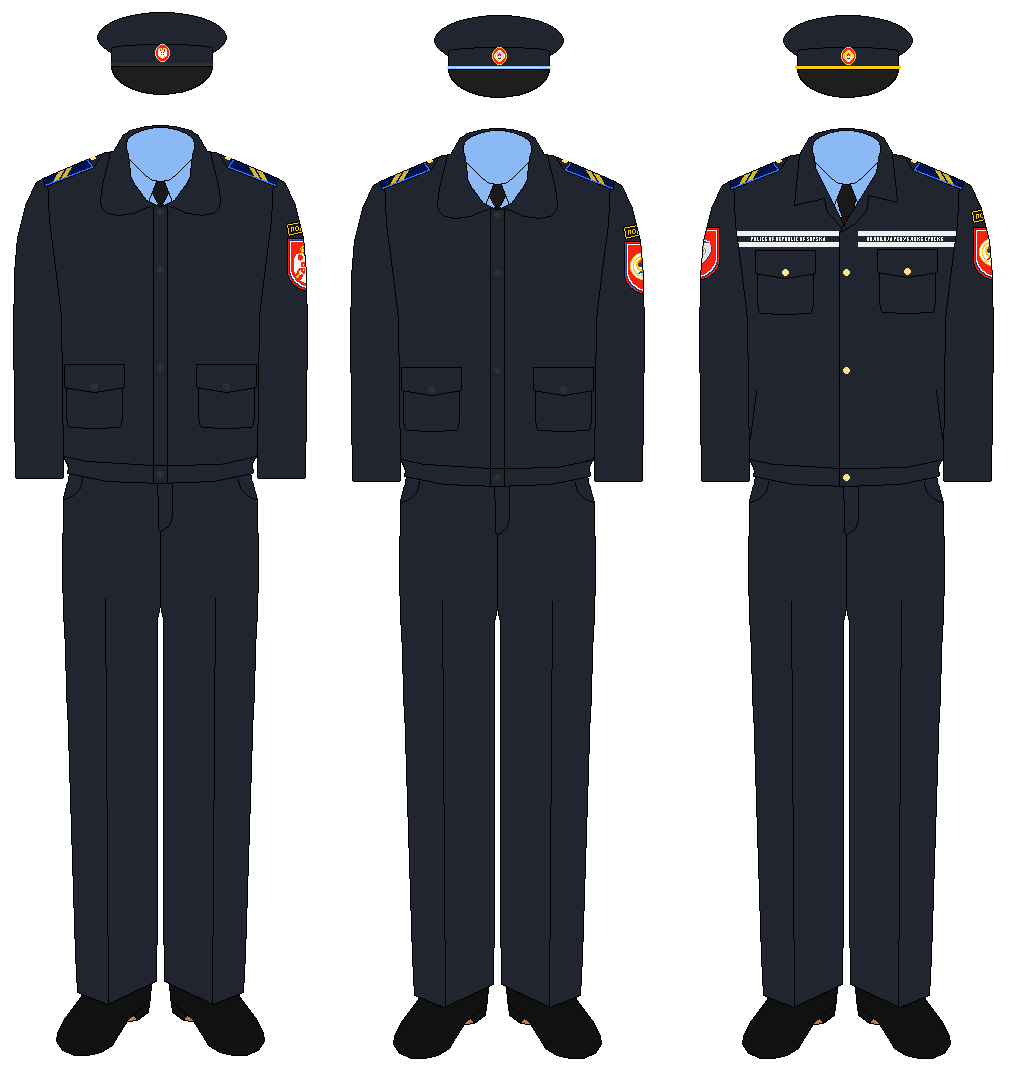
Police uniforms: first between 2003/4 and 2007/8, second between 2007/8 and 2011/12 and third between 2011/12 and summer 2014.

The names of ranks in this period are the same as 2014 to 2018. The symbols of Republika Srpska changed: the former coat of arms of Republika Srpska with the double-headed eagle replaced the Seal of Republika Srpska. The 2008 financial crisis prevented the Ministry of Interior from changing old uniforms of police officers. In that time, the police had 4.400 officers on street with old uniforms. Uniforms of that time became a symbol for the Police of Republika Srpska. The uniform's cap had a metal insignia, arm patch on only one arm, neckties, they did not have any kind of identification; at one time the police badge was on the left breast.

Ranks of the Police of Republika Srpska 2004–2008
Rank	Полицајац; Policajac; Police officer	Виши полицајац Viši policajac Senior police officer	Наредник; Narednik; Sergeant	Виши наредник Viši narednik Senior sergeant
Insignia				
Rank	Млађи инспектор Mlađi inspektor Junior inspector	Инспектор; Inspektor; Inspector	Виши инспектор Viši inspektor Senior inspector	Самостални инспектор Samostalni inspektor Independent inspector
Insignia				
Rank	Главни инспектор Glavni inspektor Chief inspector	Генерални инспектор полиције Generalni inspektor policije General inspector of police	Главни генерални инспектор полиције Glavni generalni inspektor policije Chief general inspector of police	
Insignia				

==== 1998–2003 ====
A decision to modernize the look of the army and police was made after the war. In 1998 the Ministry of Interior started with improving the Framework Agreement for Restructuring, Reform and Democratization of the Police of Republika Srpska, and aside from changing laws, regulations, and organizations, the ministry also changed the look of uniforms and ranks of the police. Ranks were:

- učenik prve godine SŠUP (first-year student of the Secondary School of the Interior), učenik druge godine SŠUP (second-year student of the Secondary School of Interior), učenik treće godine SŠUP (third-year student of the Secondary School of the Interior), učenik četvrte godine SŠUP (fourth-year student of the Secondary School of the Interior);
- student prve godine VŠUP (first-year student of the Higher School of the Interior), student druge godine VŠUP (second-year student of the Higher School of the Interior), učenik treće godine VŠUP (third-year student of the Higher School of the Interior);
- policajac pripravnik (police officer trainee), pripravnik sa višom školskom spremom (higher educated police officer trainee), pripravnik sa visokom školskom spremom (high educated police officer trainee), policajac (police officer), vođa sektora (police sector leader), vođa sektora prve kategorije (1st category sector leader), komandir staničnog odjeljenja policije (commandeer of station police department),
- pomoćnik komandira policijske stanice (police station commandeer assistant), zamjenik komandira policijske stanice (police station commandeer deputy), komandir policijske stanice (police station commandeer), operativni dežurni DOC-a MUP-a (operative sentry of the Duty Operative Center of the Ministry of Interior),
- inspektor policije centra javne bezbjednosti (police inspector of center of public security), šef odsjeka u odjeljenju policije u centru javne bezbjednosti (detachment chief in police department in center of public security), načelnik odjeljenja policije centra javne bezbjednosti (police department chief of center of public security), načelnik sektora policije centra javne bezbjednosti (police sector chief of center of public security),
- načelnik DOC-a MUP-a (chief of Duty Operative Center of the Ministry of Interior), načelnik odjeljenja uprave policije (department of the Police Administration chief), zamjenik načelnika Službe specijalne policije(Special Police Service chief deputy), načelnik Službe specijalne policije (Special Police Service chief),
- načelnik centra javne bezbjednosti (center of public security chief), načelnik uprave (police administration chief), zamjenik ministra unutrašnjih poslova (minister of interior deputy), ministar unutrašnjih poslova (minister of interior).

Ranks of the Police of Republika Srpska 1998–2003 годах
Rank	Полицајац приправник Policajac pripravnik Police officer trainee	Приправник са вишом школском спремом Pripravnik sa višom školskom spremom Higher educated police officer trainee	Приправник са високом школском спремом Pripravnik sa visokom školskom spremom High educated police officer trainee	Полицајац; Policajac; Police officer	Вођа сектора Vođa sektora Police sector leader	Вођа сектора прве категорије Vođa sektora prve kategorije First category sector leader	Командир станичног одјељења полиције Komandir staničnog odjeljenja policije Commandeer of station police department
Insignia							
Rank	Помоћник командира полицијске станице Pomoćnik komandira policijske stanice Police station commandeer assistant	Замјеник командира полицијске станице Zamjenik komandira policijske stanice Police station commandeer deputy	Командир полицијске станице Komandir policijske stanice Police station commandeer	Оперативни дежурни ДОЦ-а МУП-а; Operativni dežurni DOC-a MUP-a; Operative sentry of the Duty Operative Center of the Ministry of Interior			
Insignia							
Rank	Инспектор полиције центра јавне безбједности Inspektor policije centra javne bezbjednosti Police inspector of center of public security	Шеф одсјека у одјељењу полиције у центру јавне безбједности Šef odsjeka u odjeljenju policije u centru javne bezbjednosti Detachment chief in police department in center of public security	Начелник одјељења полиције центра јавне безбједности Načelnik odjeljenja policije centra javne bezbjednosti Police department chief of center of public security	Начелник сектора полиције центра јавне безбједности Načelnik sektora policije centra javne bezbjednosti Police sector chief of center of public security			
Insignia							
Rank	Начелник ДОЦ-а МУП-а; Načelnik DOC-a MUP-a; Chief of Duty Operative Center of the Ministry of Interior	Начелник одјељења управе полиције Načelnik odjeljenja uprave policije Department of the Police Administration chief	Замјеник начелника Службе специјалне полиције Zamjenik načelnika Službe specijalne policije Special Police Service chief deputy	Начелник Службе специјалне полиције Načelnik Službe specijalne policije Special Police Service chief			
Insignia							
Rank	Начелник центра јавне безбједности Načelnik centra javne bezbjednosti Center of public security chief	Начелник управе Načelnik uprave Police Administration chief	Замјеник министра унутрашњих послова Zamjenik ministra unutrašnjih poslova Minister of the Interior deputy	Министар унутрашњих послова Ministar unutrašnjih poslova Minister of The Interior			
Insignia							

Student ranks of the Police of Republika Srpska 1998–2003
Secondary school ranks	Ученик I године СШУП; Učenik I godine SŠUP; First-year student of the SSoI	Ученик II године СШУП; Učenik II godine SŠUP; Second-year student of the SSoI	Ученик III године СШУП; Učenik II godine SŠUP; Third-year student of the SSoI	Ученик IV године СШУП; Učenik IV godine SŠUP; Fourth-year student of the SSoI
Insignia				
Higher school ranks	Студент прве године VŠUP; Student I godine VŠUP; First-year student of the HSoI	Студент II године ВШУП; Student II godine VŠUP; Second-year student of the HSoI	Студент III године ВШУП; Student III godine VŠUP; Third-year student of the HSoI	
Insignia				

==== 1992–1998 ====
Post-war photo of police officers near Zvornik. Central figures are officers of the police and their ranks are 2nd lieutenant and colonel.

In the beginning of the war, the Police of the Republika Srpska mainly had the same uniform as the Yugoslav Militsiya. The Special Police Detachment had camouflage uniforms with blue lizard pattern and also sometimes even uniforms with military camouflage pattern. Ranks in this period were similar to military ranks:

- non-commissioned officers: mlađi narednik (junior sergeant), mlađi narednik prve klase (first class junior sergeant), narednik (sergeant), narednik prve klase (first class sergeant), stariji narednik (senior sergeant), stariji narednik prve klase (first class senior sergeant),
- officers: potporučnik (second lieutenant), poručnik (lieutenant), kapetan (captain), kapetan prve klase (first class captain), major (major), potpukovnik (lieutenant colonel), pukovnik (colonel),
- generals: general-major (major general), general-potpukovnik (lieutenant colonel general), general-pukovnik (colonel general).

Ranks of the Police of Republika Srpska 1992–1998
Rank	Млађи наредник Mlađi narednik Junior sergeant	Млађи наредник прве класе Mlađi narednik prve klase First class junior sergeant	Наредник; Narednik; Sergeant	Наредник прве класе Narednik prve klase First class sergeant	Старији наредник Stariji narednik Senior sergeant	Старији наредник прве класе Stariji narednik prve klase First class senior sergeant
Insignia						
Rank	Потпоручник; Potporučnik; 2nd lieutenant	Поручник; Poručnik; Lieutenant	Капетан; Kapetan; Captain	Капетан прве класе Kapetan prve klase First class captain		
Insignia						
Rank	Мајор; Major; Major	Потпуковник; Potpukovnik; Lieutenant colonel	Пуковник; Pukovnik; Colonel			
Insignia						
Rank	Генерал-мајор; General-major; Major general	Генерал-потпуковник; General-potpukovnik; Lieutenant colonel general	Генерал-пуковник; General-pukovnik; Colonel general			
Insignia						

== Education ==
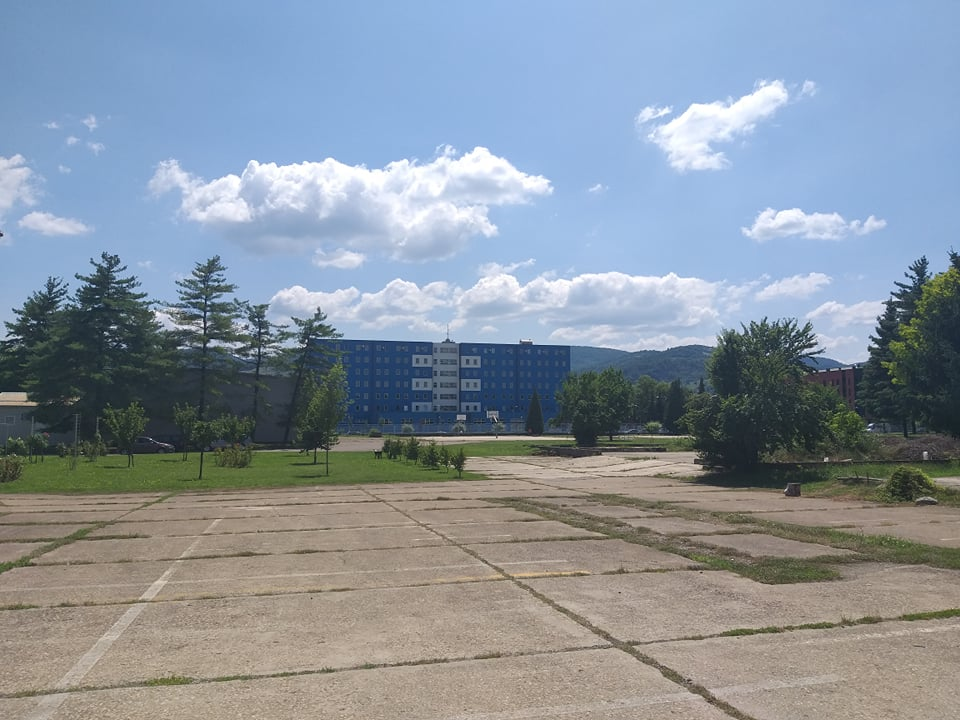
Building where the Police Academy and the Faculty of Security Sciences are located in Banja Luka.

Police officers in Republika Srpska are educated in several institutions and units. Usually, all the police officers during education belong to the Administration for police training. Educational institutions that officers attend are Police Academy and Faculty of Security Sciences.

=== Secondary School of the Interior ===
Secondary School of the Interior was founded on September 9, 1992, as an organization unit of the Ministry of Interior for education and professional training of new police forces in Republika Srpska. Education took four years. It was part of the center for education of staff of the Interior. There was also a six-month long course for civilians that wanted to become police officers.

=== Police Academy ===
Police Academy was founded on July 2, 1999, by the Government of Republika Srpska. Teaching started on July 19, 1999. The duties of the Police Academy are professional education and training. Today education is based on the Unit for Police Training. The unit has its own chief. The academy belongs to the Administration for Police Training and it is a suborganization of the Ministry of Interior. Students of the academy are called cadets.

There is also the Unit for Professional Improvement. The unit has two detachments:

- Detachment for Special Training (Одјељење за специјализовану обуку, Odjeljenje za specijalizovanu obuku), whose duties include planning and organizing of special training, and acquiring knowledge and skills using special training
- Detachment for Professional Improvement (Одјељење за стручно усавршавање, Odjeljenje za stručno usavršavanje)

=== Faculty of Security Sciences ===
The Faculty of Security Sciences was founded on July 1, 1995 as the High School of the Interior, which began operations on November 21, 1995. The curriculum took five semesters, and graduates were given the title of jurist of internal affairs. On July 23, 2002, it became the College of the Interior and operation began on October 1, 2002. It was later renamed the Faculty of Security Sciences and became the eighteenth organization of the University of Banja Luka in 2017.

== Oath ==
The oath of the Police of Republika Srpska is:

I (name and surname) swear that I will conscientiously and responsibly perform my duty as a police officer, that I will abide by the Constitution and laws of Republika Srpska and Bosnia and Herzegovina and will protect the constitutional order of Republika Srpska and Bosnia and Herzegovina, rights, freedoms and security, that I will perform the duties and tasks of a police officer even in cases where the performance of these duties and tasks puts my life in danger.

== Peace missions ==
Affairs connected with peacekeeping operations are linked with the Interpolice Cooperation Detachment of the Minister Service. Officers of the Police of Republika Srpska have participated in UN peacekeeping missions since 2000. For police officers in Srpska that are interested in peacekeeping missions there are several requirements: eight years of effective work in police service for male officers and five years for females, proficiency in the English language, good physical and mental health, and the possession of the B category driving license. To access training, police officers need to demonstrate good English language knowledge and computer skills. Afterwards, they have two tests: pre-mission training and the SAAT test. Police officers of Republika Srpska participate in various international peacekeeping missions:

- United Nations Mission of Support to East Timor (UNMISET),
- United Nations Mission in Liberia (UNMIL),
- United Nations Peacekeeping Force in Cyprus (UNFICYP),
- United Nations Mission in Sudan (UNMIS),
- United Nations Mission in South Sudan (UNMISS),
- MONUSCO.

In 2018 there were 11 police officers all around the world in peacekeeping missions. Their duties included assisting local police, trainings, and consultations.

== Extra-curricular activities ==
Besides standard police duties, most officers are involved in other activities. They have their own futsal club, KMF Policajac. It was part of the second futsal league of Republika Srpska – West of Football Association of Republika Srpska and in 2018–19 was ranked in first place. Police officers participated in the 2011 World Police Indoor Soccer Tournament in Eibergen, Netherlands, where they won second place.

== Gallery ==
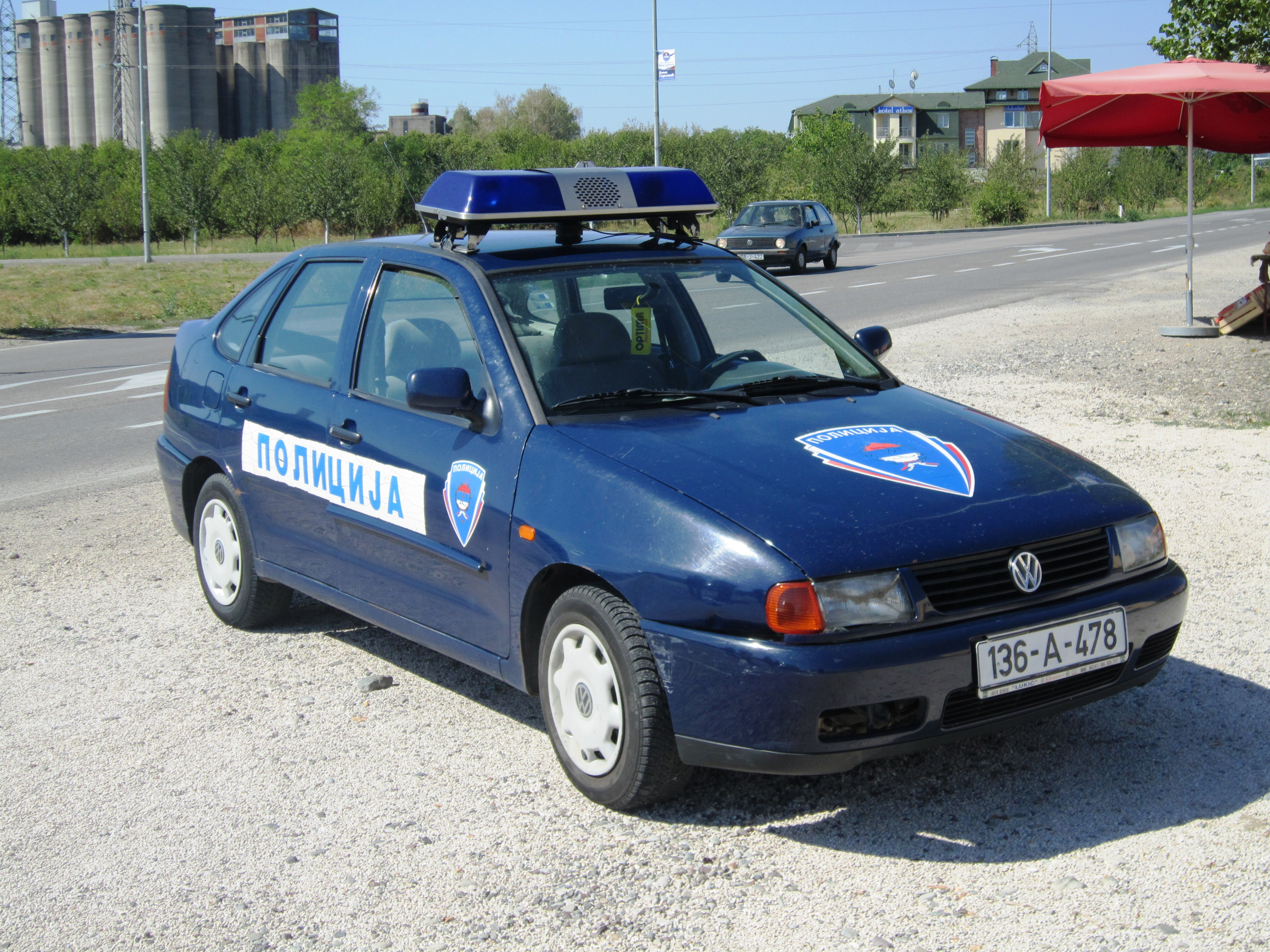
Old police car

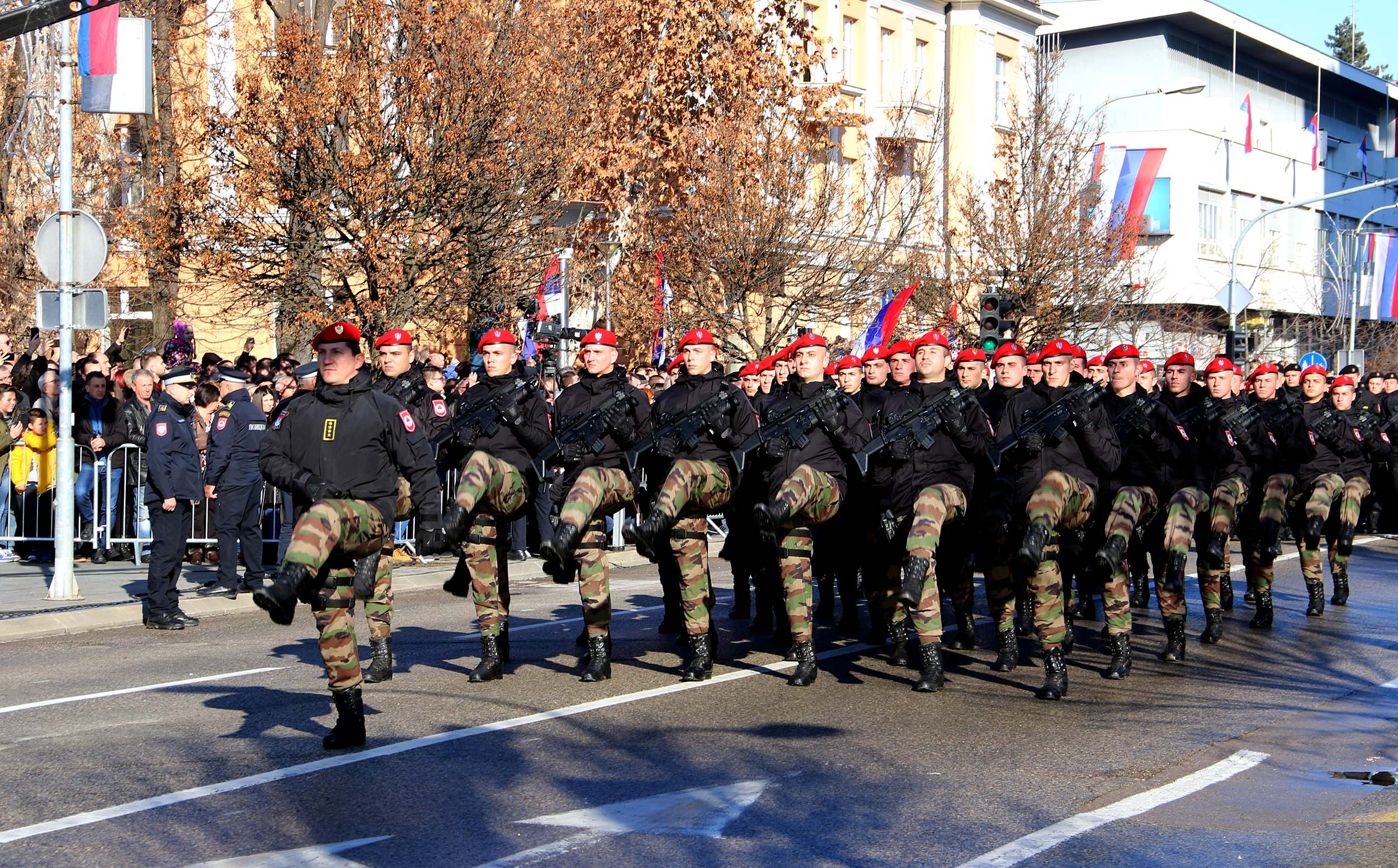
Special Anti-Terrorist Unit on parade

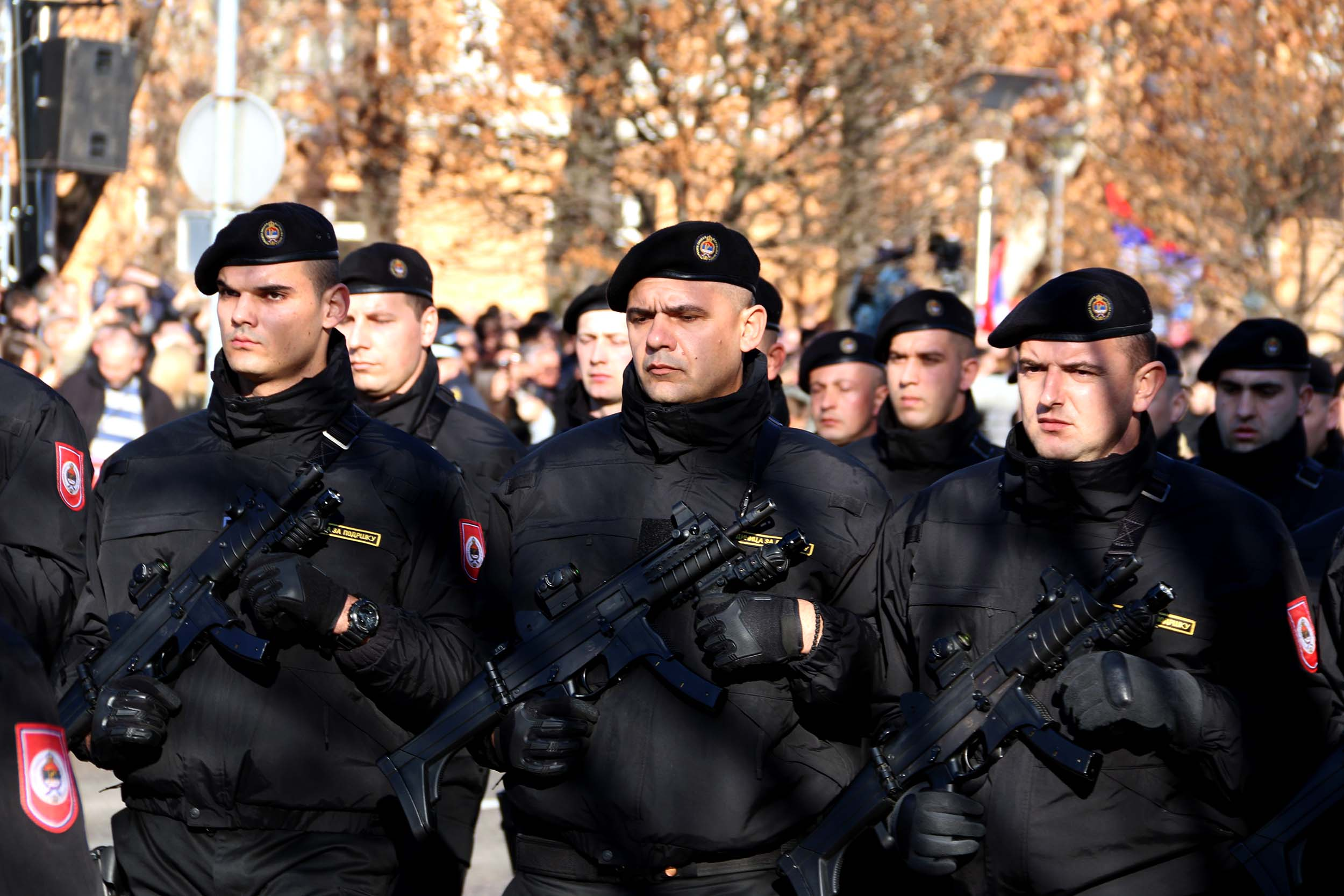
Support Unit on parade

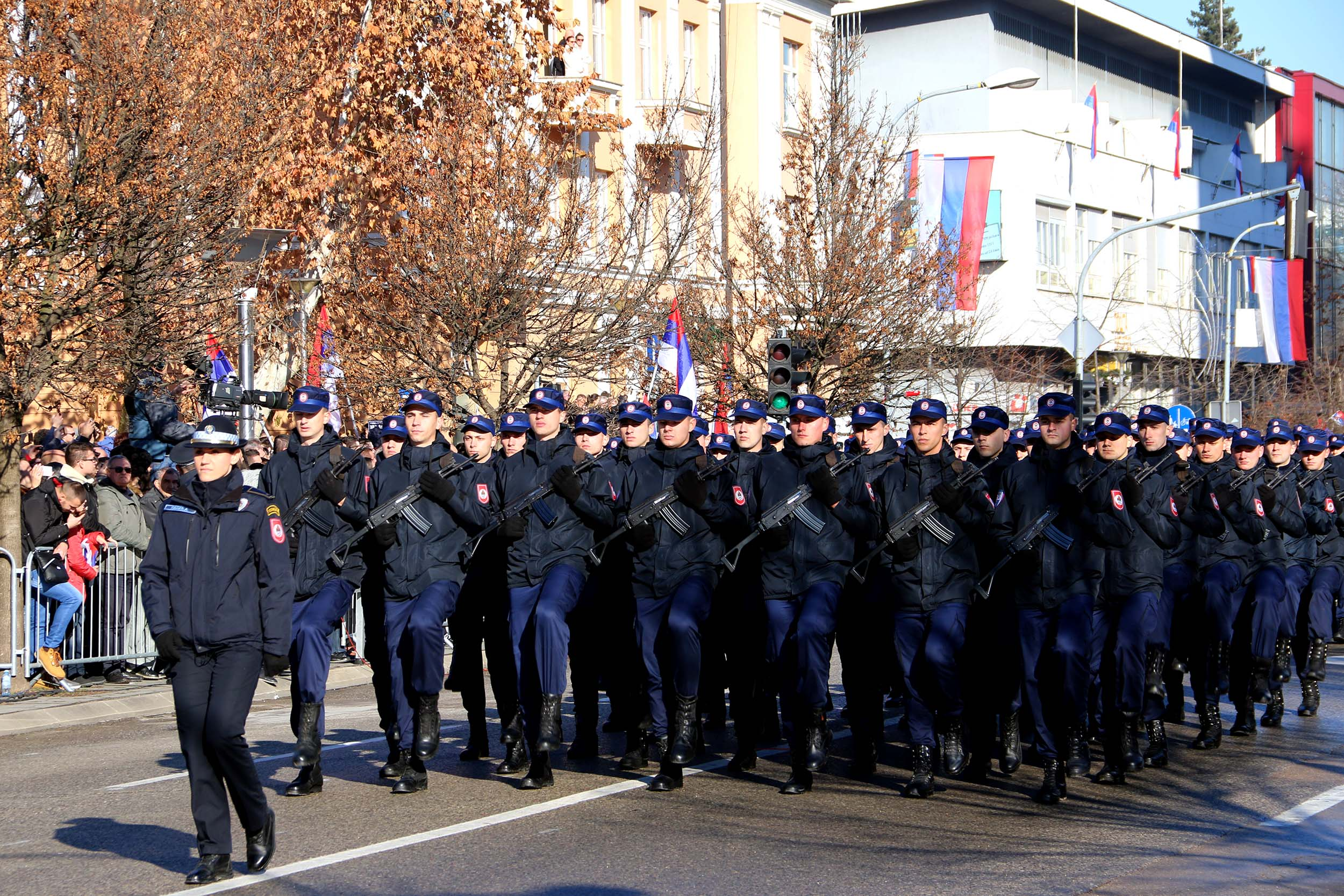
Cadets of the Police Academy on parade

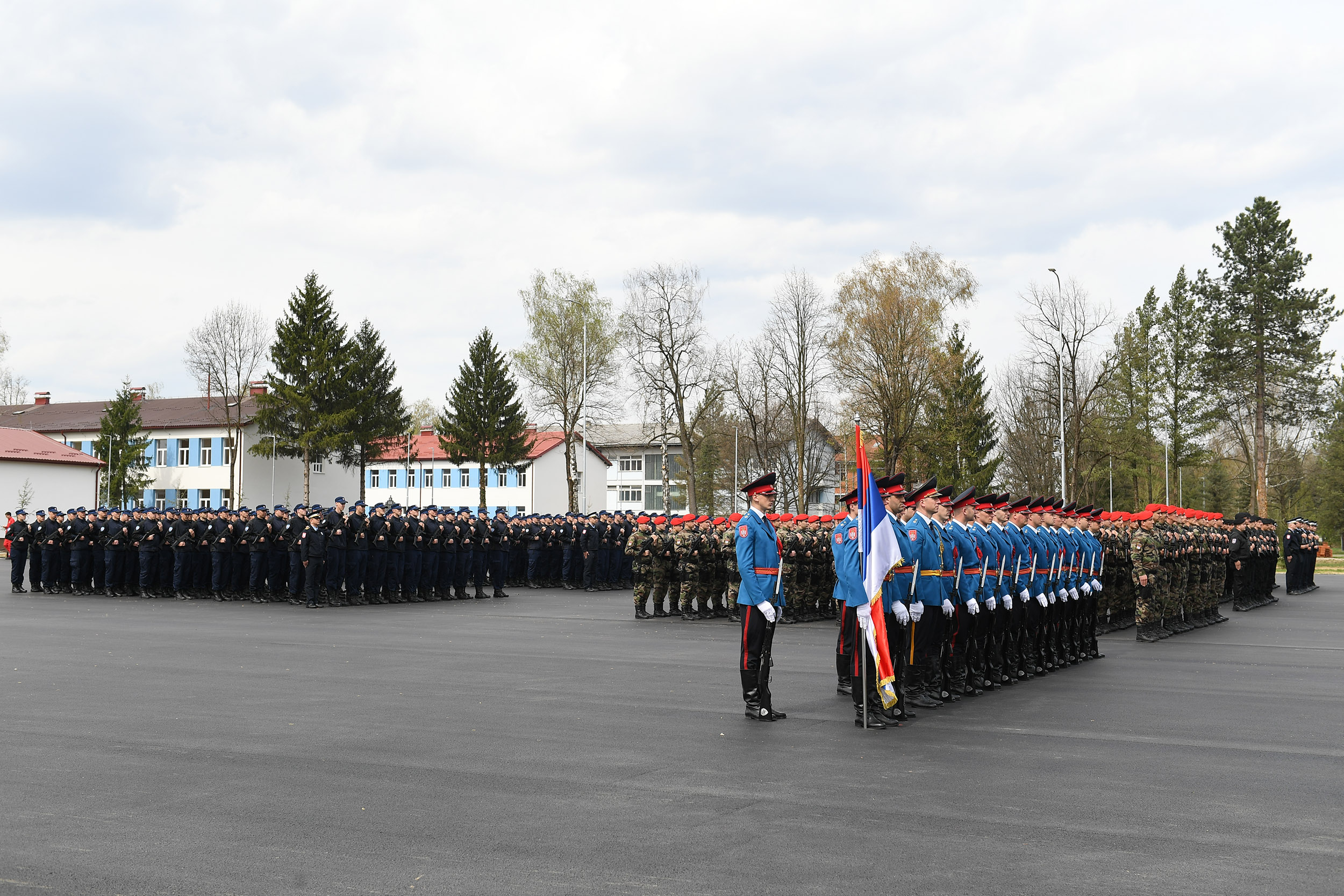
Police officers and police cadets in formations on Police Day

== See also ==
- Republika Srpska
- Gendarmerie (Republika Srpska)
