= Zoran Đerić =

Zoran Đerić was minister of the interior of the Republika Srpska. He was removed from office in 2004 by the High representative because of his failure to ensure that article 19 of the Statute of the International Criminal Tribunal for the Former Yugoslavia was met. During his time in office, not a single person indicted by that court saw trial.
