= Ministry of Interior (Republika Srpska) =

Ministry of Interior of Republika Srpska
- Министарство унутрашњих послова Републике Српске; Ministarstvo unutrašnjih poslova Republike Srpske
- MUP RS emblem

- The MUP RS building in Banja Luka.

Agency overview
- Formed: 22 April 1992; 34 years ago
- Jurisdiction: Republika Srpska
- Headquarters: Banja Luka
- Ministers responsible: Željko Budimir, Minister of Interior
- Agency executive: Siniša Kostrešević, Director of Police
- Website: www.mup.vladars.net

The Ministry of Interior of Republika Srpska (Serbo-Croatian: Министарство унутрашњих послова Републике Српске (МУП РС) / Ministarstvo unutrašnjih poslova Republike Srpske (MUP RS)) is the interior ministry of Republika Srpska, an entity of Bosnia and Herzegovina.

== Description ==
The police are under the direct control of the MUP RS. The duties of the police are protecting the rights of all its citizens, preventing and responding to disasters and other emergency situations, and maintaining law and order in society and amongst the civil population. Counter-terrorism branches of the police are tasked with anti-terrorist operations and high-profile apprehensions. The police have their main headquarters in Banja Luka, but police academies are situated in Pale, Prijedor, and Bijeljina.

=== CPT report ===
The Council of Europe's Committee for the Prevention of Torture (CPT) has been critical of law enforcement and prison conditions in Republika Srpska, stating that "ill-treatment by the police remains a frequent occurrence and that little, if any, progress has been made" and that "It should be emphasised that some of the ill-treatment alleged was of such severity that it would amount to torture."

== List of ministers ==
No.	Portrait	Minister	Took office	Left office	Time in office	Party	Ref.
1	Mićo Stanišić	Mićo Stanišić (born 1954)	22 April 1992	20 January 1993	273 days	SDS	
2	Ratko Adžić	Ratko Adžić	20 January 1993	18 August 1994	1 year, 210 days	SDS	
3	Živko Rakić	Živko Rakić	18 August 1994	17 December 1995	1 year, 121 days	SDS	
4	Dragan Kijac	Dragan Kijac	17 December 1995	18 January 1998	2 years, 32 days	SDS	
5	Milovan Stanković [sr]	Milovan Stanković (born 1949)	18 January 1998	12 January 2001	2 years, 360 days	SP	
6	Perica Bundalo [sr]	Perica Bundalo (born 1958)	12 January 2001	?	?	PDP	
7	Dragomir Jovičić [sr]	Dragomir Jovičić (born 1961)	?	17 January 2003	?	?	—
8	Zoran Đerić	Zoran Đerić (Note: Removed by High Representative.)	17 January 2003	30 June 2004	1 year, 165 days	PDP	
9	Darko Matijašević	Darko Matijašević (born 1968)	16 September 2004	28 February 2006	1 year, 162 days	Independent	
10	Stanislav Čađo [sr]	Stanislav Čađo (born 1961)	28 February 2006	12 March 2013	7 years, 12 days	SNSD	
11	Radislav Jovičić [sr]	Radislav Jovičić (born 1971)	12 March 2013	18 December 2014	1 year, 281 days	DNS	
12	Dragan Lukač	Dragan Lukač (born 1968)	18 December 2014	21 December 2022	8 years, 3 days	SNSD	
13	Siniša Karan	Siniša Karan (born 1962)	21 December 2022	2 September 2025	2 years, 255 days	SNSD	
14	Željko Budimir	Željko Budimir (born 1977)	2 September 2025	Incumbent	Incumbent	SNSD	

== See also ==
- Police of Republika Srpska
- Government of Republika Srpska
