= 2001 in Europe =

This is a list of 2001 events that occurred in Europe.

== Incumbents ==
- Albania
  - President – Rexhep Meidani, President of Albania (1997–2002)
  - Prime Minister – Ilir Meta, Prime Minister of Albania (1999–2002)
- Andorra
  - Monarchs –
    - French Co-Prince – Jacques Chirac, French Co-prince of Andorra (1995–2007)
      - Co-Prince's Representative – Frédéric de Saint-Sernin (1999–2002)
    - Episcopal Co-Prince – Archbishop Joan Martí i Alanis, Episcopal Co-prince of Andorra (1971–2003)
      - Co-Prince's Representative – Nemesi Marquès i Oste (1993–2012)
  - Prime Minister – Marc Forné Molné, Head of Government of Andorra (1994–2005)
- Armenia
  - President – Robert Kocharyan, President of Armenia (1998–2008)
  - Prime Minister – Andranik Margaryan, Prime Minister of Armenia (2000–2007)
- Austria
  - President – Thomas Klestil, Federal President of Austria (1992–2004)
  - Chancellor – Wolfgang Schüssel, Federal Chancellor of Austria (2000–2007)
- Azerbaijan
  - President – Heydar Aliyev, President of Azerbaijan (1993–2003)
  - Prime Minister – Artur Rasizade, Prime Minister of Azerbaijan (1996–2003)
  - Nagorno-Karabakh (unrecognised, secessionist state)
    - President – Arkadi Ghukasyan, President of Nagorno-Karabakh (1997–2007)
    - Prime Minister – Anushavan Danielyan, Prime Minister of Nagorno-Karabakh (1999–2007)
- Belarus
  - President – Alexander Lukashenko, President of Belarus (1994–present)
  - Prime Minister –
    1. Vladimir Yermoshin, Prime Minister of Belarus (2000–2001)
    2. Gennady Novitsky, Prime Minister of Belarus (2001–2003)
- Belgium
  - Monarch – Albert II, King of the Belgians (1993–2013)
  - Prime Minister – Guy Verhofstadt, Prime Minister of Belgium (1999–2008)
- Bosnia and Herzegovina
  - Head of State – Presidency of Bosnia and Herzegovina
    - Serb Member – Živko Radišić (1998–2002; Chairman of the Presidency of Bosnia and Herzegovina, 2000–2001)
    - Bosniak Member –
      1. Halid Genjac (2000–2001)
      2. Beriz Belkić (2001–2002)
    - Croat Member –
      1. Ante Jelavić (1998–2001)
      2. Jozo Križanović (2001–2002; Chairman of the Presidency of Bosnia and Herzegovina, 2001–2002)
  - Prime Minister –
    1. Martin Raguž, Chairman of the Council of Ministers of Bosnia and Herzegovina (2000–2001)
    2. Božidar Matić, Chairman of the Council of Ministers of Bosnia and Herzegovina (2001)
    3. Zlatko Lagumdžija, Chairman of the Council of Ministers of Bosnia and Herzegovina (2001–2002)
  - High Representative – Wolfgang Petritsch, High Representative for Bosnia and Herzegovina (1999–2002)
- Bulgaria
  - President – Petar Stoyanov, President of Bulgaria (1997–2002)
  - Prime Minister –
    1. Ivan Kostov, Prime Minister of Bulgaria (1997–2001)
    2. Simeon Saxe-Coburg-Gotha, Prime Minister of Bulgaria (2001–2005)
- Croatia
  - President – Stjepan Mesić, President of Croatia (2000–2010)
  - Prime Minister – Ivica Račan, Prime Minister of Croatia (2000–2003)
- Cyprus
  - President – Glafcos Clerides, President of Cyprus (1993–2003)
  - Northern Cyprus (unrecognised, secessionist state)
    - President – Rauf Denktaş, President of Northern Cyprus (1976–2005)
    - Prime Minister – Derviş Eroğlu, Prime Minister of Northern Cyprus (1996–2004)
- Czech Republic
  - President – Václav Havel, President of the Czech Republic (1993–2003)
  - Prime Minister – Miloš Zeman, Prime Minister of the Czech Republic (1998–2002)
- Denmark
  - Monarch – Margrethe II, Queen of Denmark (1972–2024)
  - Prime Minister –
    1. Poul Nyrup Rasmussen, Prime Minister of Denmark (1993–2001)
    2. Anders Fogh Rasmussen, Prime Minister of Denmark (2001–2009)
- Estonia
  - President –
    1. Lennart Meri, President of Estonia (1992–2001)
    2. Arnold Rüütel, President of Estonia (2001–2006)
  - Prime Minister – Mart Laar, Prime Minister of Estonia (1999–2002)
- European Union
  - President of the European Commission – Romano Prodi
  - President of the Parliament – Nicole Fontaine
  - President of the European Council –
    1. Göran Persson (January–June)
    2. Guy Verhofstadt (July–December)
  - Presidency of the Council of the EU –
    1. Sweden (January–July)
    2. Belgium (July–December)
- Finland
  - President – Tarja Halonen, President of Finland (2000–2012)
  - Prime Minister – Paavo Lipponen, Prime Minister of Finland (1995–2003)
- France
  - President – Jacques Chirac, President of France (1995–2007)
  - Prime Minister – Lionel Jospin, Prime Minister of France (1997–2002)
- Georgia
  - President – Eduard Shevardnadze, President of Georgia (1995–2003)
  - Prime Minister –
    1. Giorgi Arsenishvili, Minister of State of Georgia (2000–2001)
    2. Avtandil Jorbenadze, Minister of State of Georgia (2001–2003)
  - Abkhazia (unrecognised, secessionist state)
    - President – Vladislav Ardzinba, President of Abkhazia (1990–2005) (Note: Abkhazia only declared independence in 1992.)
    - Prime Minister –
      1. Viacheslav Tsugba, Prime Minister of Abkhazia (1999–2001)
      2. Anri Jergenia, Prime Minister of Abkhazia (2001–2002)
  - South Ossetia (unrecognised, secessionist state)
    - President –
      1. Lyudvig Chibirov, President of South Ossetia (1993–2001)
      2. Eduard Kokoity, President of South Ossetia (2001–2011)
    - Prime Minister –
      1. Merab Chigoev, Prime Minister of South Ossetia (1998–2001)
      2. Dmitry Sanakoyev, Prime Minister of South Ossetia (2001)
      3. Gerasim Khugayev, Prime Minister of South Ossetia (2001–2003)
- Germany
  - President – Johannes Rau, Federal President of Germany (1999–2004)
  - Chancellor – Gerhard Schröder, Federal Chancellor of Germany (1998–2005)
- Greece
  - President – Konstantinos Stephanopoulos, President of Greece (1995–2005)
  - Prime Minister – Costas Simitis, Prime Minister of Greece (1996–2004)
- Hungary
  - President – Ferenc Mádl, President of Hungary (2000–2005)
  - Prime Minister – Viktor Orbán, Prime Minister of Hungary (1998–2002)
- Iceland
  - President – Ólafur Ragnar Grímsson, President of Iceland (1996–2016)
  - Prime Minister – Davíð Oddsson, Prime Minister of Iceland (1991–2004)
- Ireland
  - President – Mary McAleese, President of Ireland (1997–2011)
  - Prime Minister – Bertie Ahern, Taoiseach of Ireland (1997–2008)
- Italy
  - President – Carlo Azeglio Ciampi, President of Italy (1999–2006)
  - Prime Minister –
    1. Giuliano Amato, President of the Council of Ministers of Italy (2000–2001)
    2. Silvio Berlusconi, President of the Council of Ministers of Italy (2001–2006)
- Latvia
  - President – Vaira Vīķe-Freiberga, President of Latvia (1999–2007)
  - Prime Minister – Andris Bērziņš, Prime Minister of Latvia (2000–2002)
- Liechtenstein
  - Monarch – Hans-Adam II, Prince Regnant of Liechtenstein (1989–present)
  - Prime Minister –
    1. Mario Frick, Head of Government of Liechtenstein (1993–2001)
    2. Otmar Hasler, Head of Government of Liechtenstein (2001–2009)
- Lithuania
  - President – Valdas Adamkus, President of Lithuania (1998–2003)
  - Prime Minister –
    1. Rolandas Paksas, Prime Minister of Lithuania (2000–2001)
    2. Eugenijus Gentvilas, Acting Prime Minister of Lithuania (2001)
    3. Algirdas Brazauskas, Prime Minister of Lithuania (2001–2006)
- Luxembourg
  - Monarch – Henri, Grand Duke of Luxembourg (2000–present)
  - Prime Minister – Jean-Claude Juncker, Prime Minister of Luxembourg (1995–2013)
- Macedonia
  - President – Boris Trajkovski, President of Macedonia (1999–2004)
  - Prime Minister – Ljubčo Georgievski, President of the Government of Macedonia (1998–2002)
- Malta
  - President – Guido de Marco, President of Malta (1999–2004)
  - Prime Minister – Eddie Fenech Adami, Prime Minister of Malta (1998–2004)
- Moldova
  - President –
    1. Petru Lucinschi, President of Moldova (1997–2001)
    2. Vladimir Voronin, President of Moldova (2001–2009)
  - Prime Minister –
    1. Dumitru Braghiș, Prime Minister of Moldova (1999–2001)
    2. Vasile Tarlev, Prime Minister of Moldova (2001–2008)
  - Transnistria (unrecognised, secessionist state)
    - President – Igor Smirnov, President of Transnistria (1990–2011) (Note: Transnistria only declared independence in 1991.)
- Monaco
  - Monarch – Rainier III, Sovereign Prince of Monaco (1949–2005)
  - Prime Minister – Patrick Leclercq, Minister of State of Monaco (2000–2005)
- Kingdom of the Netherlands
  - Monarch – Beatrix, Queen of the Netherlands (1980–2013)
  - Netherlands (constituent country of the Kingdom of the Netherlands)
    - Prime Minister – Wim Kok, Prime Minister of the Netherlands (1994–2002)
  - Netherlands Antilles (constituent country of the Kingdom of the Netherlands)
    - see § North America
  - Aruba (constituent country of the Kingdom of the Netherlands)
    - see § North America
- Norway
  - Monarch – Harald V, King of Norway (1991–present)
  - Prime Minister –
    1. Jens Stoltenberg, Prime Minister of Norway (2000–2001)
    2. Kjell Magne Bondevik, Prime Minister of Norway (2001–2005)
- Poland
  - President – Aleksander Kwaśniewski, President of Poland (1995–2005)
  - Prime Minister –
    1. Jerzy Buzek, Chairman of the Council of Ministers of Poland (1997–2001)
    2. Leszek Miller, Chairman of the Council of Ministers of Poland (2001–2004)
- Portugal
  - President – Jorge Sampaio, President of Portugal (1996–2006)
  - Prime Minister – António Guterres, Prime Minister of Portugal (1995–2002)
- Romania
  - President – Ion Iliescu, President of Romania (2000–2004)
  - Prime Minister – Adrian Năstase, Prime Minister of Romania (2000–2004)
- Russia
  - President – Vladimir Putin, President of Russia (1999–2008)
  - Prime Minister – Mikhail Kasyanov, Chairman of the Government of Russia (2000–2004)
- San Marino
  - Captains-Regent –
    1. Gianfranco Terenzi and Enzo Colombini, Captains Regent of San Marino (2000–2001)
    2. Luigi Lonfernini and Fabio Berardi, Captains Regent of San Marino (2001)
    3. Alberto Cecchetti and Gino Giovagnoli, Captains Regent of San Marino (2001–2002)
- Slovakia
  - President – Rudolf Schuster, President of Slovakia (1999–2004)
  - Prime Minister – Mikuláš Dzurinda, Prime Minister of Slovakia (1998–2006)
- Slovenia
  - President – Milan Kučan, President of Slovenia (1990–2002) (Note: Slovenia only became independent in 1991.)
  - Prime Minister – Janez Drnovšek, Prime Minister of Slovenia (2000–2002)
- Spain
  - Monarch – Juan Carlos I, King of Spain (1975–2014)
  - Prime Minister – José María Aznar, President of the Government of Spain (1996–2004)
- Sweden
  - Monarch – Carl XVI Gustaf, King of Sweden (1973–present)
  - Prime Minister – Göran Persson, Prime Minister of Sweden (1996–2006)
- Switzerland
  - Council – Federal Council of Switzerland (Note: The seven-member Swiss Federal Council is head of state and government collectively. As a party to the Council, the president serves solely in a primus inter pares capacity for one year.)
    - Members – Kaspar Villiger (1989–2003), Ruth Dreifuss (1993–2002), Moritz Leuenberger (1995–2010; President of Switzerland, 2001), Pascal Couchepin (1998–2009), Ruth Metzler (1999–2003), Joseph Deiss (1999–2006), and Samuel Schmid (2000–2008)
- Turkey
  - President – Ahmet Necdet Sezer, President of Turkey (2000–2007)
  - Prime Minister – Bülent Ecevit, Prime Minister of Turkey (1999–2002)
- Ukraine
  - President – Leonid Kuchma, President of Ukraine (1994–2005)
  - Prime Minister –
    1. Viktor Yushchenko, Prime Minister of Ukraine (1999–2001)
    2. Anatoliy Kinakh, Prime Minister of Ukraine (2001–2002)
- United Kingdom
  - Monarch – Elizabeth II, Queen of the United Kingdom (1952–2022)
  - Prime Minister – Tony Blair, Prime Minister of the United Kingdom (1997–2007)
  - Isle of Man (Crown dependency of the United Kingdom)
    - Lieutenant-Governor – Ian Macfadyen, Lieutenant Governor of the Isle of Man (2000–2005)
    - Chief Minister –
      1. Donald Gelling, Chief Minister of the Isle of Man (1996–2001)
      2. Richard Corkill, Chief Minister of the Isle of Man (2001–2004)
  - Guernsey (Crown dependency of the United Kingdom)
    - Lieutenant-Governor – Sir John Foley, Lieutenant Governor of Guernsey (2000–2005)
    - Bailiff – de Vic Carey, Bailiff of Guernsey (1999–2005)
  - Jersey (Crown dependency of the United Kingdom)
    - Lieutenant-Governor –
      1. Sir Michael Wilkes, Lieutenant Governor of Jersey (1995–2001)
      2. Sir John Cheshire, Lieutenant Governor of Jersey (2001–2006)
    - Bailiff – Sir Philip Bailhache, Bailiff of Jersey (1995–2009)
  - Gibraltar (Dependent Territory of the United Kingdom)
    - Governor – David Durie, Governor of Gibraltar (2000–2003)
    - Chief Minister – Peter Caruana, Chief Minister of Gibraltar (1996–2011)
- Vatican City
  - Monarch – Pope John Paul II, Sovereign of Vatican City (1978–2005)
  - Head of Government – Cardinal Edmund Szoka, President of the Governorate of Vatican City (1997–2006)
  - Holy See (sui generis subject of public international law)
    - Secretary of State – Cardinal Angelo Sodano, Cardinal Secretary of State (1990–2006)
- Yugoslavia
  - President – Vojislav Koštunica, President of Yugoslavia (2000–2003)
  - Prime Minister –
    1. Zoran Žižić, Prime Minister of Yugoslavia (2000–2001)
    2. Dragiša Pešić, Prime Minister of Yugoslavia (2001–2003)
  - Kosovo (Self-Governing Entity under UN administration)
    - UN Special Representative –
      1. Bernard Kouchner, Special Representative of the UN Secretary-General for Kosovo (1999–2001)
      2. Hans Hækkerup, Special Representative of the UN Secretary-General for Kosovo (2001)

== Events ==
=== February ===
- February 19 – The 2001 UK foot-and-mouth crisis begins.
- February 28 – The Great Heck rail crash occurs.

=== March ===
- March 4 – A bomb explodes at BBC Television Centre in London, UK.

=== April ===
- April 1 - Former Federal Republic of Yugoslavia President Slobodan Milošević surrenders to police special forces, to be tried on charges of war crimes.

=== May ===
- May 13 – Silvio Berlusconi wins the general election and becomes Prime Minister of Italy for the second time.

=== July ===
- July 7 – 2001 Bradford riots: Race riots erupt in Bradford in the north of England
- July 19 – UK politician and novelist Jeffrey Archer is sentenced to 4 years in prison for perjury and perverting the course of justice.
- July 20–22 – The 27th G8 summit takes place in Genoa, Italy. Massive demonstrations are held against the meeting by members of the anti-globalization movement. One demonstrator, Carlo Giuliani, is killed by a policeman.
- July 24 – Simeon Saxe-Coburg-Gotha, deposed as the last Tsar of Bulgaria when a child, is sworn in as the democratically elected 48th Prime Minister of Bulgaria.

=== September ===
- September 21
  - Teenager Ross Parker murdered in racially motivated attack by Muslim Asian gang in Peterborough.
  - In Toulouse, France, the AZote Fertilisant chemical factory explodes, killing 29 and seriously wounding over 2,500.
- September 27 – Zug massacre: In Zug, Switzerland, a gunman shoots 32 members of parliament, killing 14 of them and then himself.

== Deaths ==
=== January ===
- Madeleine Barbulée, French actress (b. 1910)
- Michael Hanley, British intelligence officer, Director-General of MI5 (b. 1918)
- Fabijan Šovagović, Croatian actor and writer (b. 1932)

== See also ==
- 2001 in the European Union
- List of state leaders in Europe in 2001
