= Human rights in Bosnia and Herzegovina =

The human rights record of Bosnia and Herzegovina has been criticised over a number of years by intergovernmental organisations including the United Nations Human Rights Council, the European Court of Human Rights and the Organisation for Security and Co-operation in Europe, as well as international and domestic non-governmental organisations such as Human Rights Watch and Amnesty International. The government of Bosnia and Herzegovina has been criticised for ethnic and religious discrimination in its treatment of ethnic and religious minorities such as the Romani people and the Jewish people. The government has also been criticised for its treatment of Internally Displaced Persons following the Bosnian War and its failure to provide asylum seekers with resources such as food, shelter and medical assistance. According to BH Novinari, the Bosnian Journalists’ Association, freedom of the media is an issue in Bosnia and Herzegovina, with journalists facing attacks, threats and pressure from government. Human rights non-government organisations have also reported interference in their work from the government. The Bosnian government has been criticised by the European Union for its slow response to domestically prosecute war crimes from the Bosnian War following the closure of the International Criminal Tribunal for the Former Yugoslavia in December 2017.

== History ==
Ethnic conflict has been prominent in the Bosnian and Herzegovinian society since the breakup of Yugoslavia. The three main ethnic groups are the Bosniaks, who are predominantly Muslim; the Croats, who are Catholic; and the Serbs, who are Eastern Orthodox. This ethnic conflict resulted in the Bosnian War which took place between 1992 and 1995 following Bosnia and Herzegovina's independence from the Socialist Federal Republic of Yugoslavia. The war resulted in death toll of over 101,000 people. War crimes and human rights violations were perpetrated by all nationalities involved. The largest amount of war crime charges were brought against the Serbs.

== Ethnic and religious discrimination ==
In 2019 the World Bank published a report that found that discrimination against the Roma people is a significant problem in Western Balkan countries, including Bosnia and Herzegovina. The report found that Roma people, who comprise 1.7% of the Bosnian population, have more difficulty accessing basic services such as healthcare, education, employment and housing than the non-Roma population.

International non-government organisation Human Rights Watch identified in its Annual Report for 2020 that discrimination against ethnic and religious minorities remains a significant human rights issue in Bosnia and Herzegovina. The Bosnian constitution prohibits ethnic minorities such as the Jewish people and the Roma people, which are the two largest minority groups in the country, from running for presidency.

The complexities of the Constitution of Bosnia and Herzegovina are a result of the Dayton Peace Accords, which were signed in 1995 at the conclusion of the Bosnian War.

Due to the significant role that ethnic nationalism and ethnic identity politics play in Bosnian society, the Bosnian Constitution stipulates that the Presidency of the government must consist of three directly elected members. One presidential member is elected each by the Bosniaks, the Croats and the Serbs. A presidential candidate must identify with only one of these ethnic identities and is ineligible if they are a member of any additional ethnic groups, which prevents ethnic minorities, such as the Roma and Jewish people, from running for presidency, as well as anyone who belongs to more than one of the three main ethnic groups. Additionally, Bosniaks, Croats and Serbs can only vote for one candidate who is of their own ethnic group.

These ethnicity-based restrictions on eligibility to run for elected office are controversial, and have been criticised by international bodies such as the European Court of Human Rights. In the 2009 case of Sejdić and Finci v. Bosnia and Herzegovina, the European Court of Human Rights ruled that the Bosnian Constitution was discriminatory and a contravention of the European Convention on Human Rights. Dervo Sejdić, a Roma man, and Jakob Finci, a Jewish man, lodged complaints to the European Court of Human Rights that they were ineligible to run for presidency and the House of Peoples of Bosnia and Herzegovina due to their membership of ethnic minority groups, despite the fact that both men were Bosnian citizens.

== War crimes ==
Throughout the 1992-1995 Bosnian War, a large number of human rights violations occurred. These included ethnic cleansing, extrajudicial executions, rape and torture. In December 2017, the International Criminal Tribunal for the Former Yugoslavia, the United Nations’ court created to prosecute war crimes that took place in the Bosnian War, closed. Domestic courts have since been responsible for prosecuting war crimes and crimes against humanity that took place during the war. The United Nations Human Rights Council's Report of the Office of the United Nations High Commissioner for Human Rights Compilation on Bosnia and Herzegovina reported concerns that Bosnia and Herzegovina's domestic courts had been slow to complete prosecution of war crime cases. Victims of rape and torture during the war experience numerous challenges in achieving legal justice, facing up to €5,000 in court fees if their case is not successful.

== Asylum seekers and internally displaced persons ==
As of 2020, 96 421 Bosnians continue to be classified as internally displaced persons from the Bosnian War, which ended in 1995. Fifty-eight percent of Bosnians who left the country as refugees during the War are yet to return. The government-funded Regional Housing Programme has built 1000 homes to rehouse Internally Displaced Persons and Returnees.

Both Human Rights Watch and Amnesty International have criticised the Bosnian government's management of the recent influx of asylum seekers. Criticisms include the governments slow processing of asylum applications and failure to provide basic food, shelter and medical care for asylum seekers.

== Human rights defenders and civil society ==
Human Rights Watch reported in their 2019 World Report that human rights defenders and non-government organisations faced interference in their work. They reported that police issued public disorder fines to people participating in public assemblies and protests. The Safety Net for European Journalists reported that in 2014 the Alliance of Independent Social Democrats, a major political party in Republika Srpska, issued a list of journalists and non government organisations that they deemed to be “unsuitable". Human Rights Watch also reported that the Republika Srpska had drafted legislation that would allow them to monitor the work and finances of non-government organisations that receive foreign donations.

== Freedom of media ==
Freedom of the press is included in the Bosnian Constitution. Freedom House classifies Bosnia and Herzegovina's press as partly free. According to the Council of Europe's Platform to Promote the Protection of Journalism and Safety of Journalists, since 2015 there have been seven “attacks on the physical safety and integrity of journalists", six incidents of "harassment or intimidation of journalists", and four "other attacks having chilling effects on media freedom". According to the Platform, fifteen of these incidents have not been resolved and two were resolved or addressed by the Bosnian government. According to Human Rights Watch, journalists experience harassment, pressure from political groups, violent attacks and intimidation including death threats. Human Rights Watch reported that BH Novinari, the journalists’ union in Bosnia and Herzegovina, reported 41 violations of freedom of the press in 2019.

== Sexual orientation and gender identity ==
Same-sexual activity is legal in Bosnia and Herzegovina. Same sex marriage and relationships are not legally recognised under Bosnian law. Transgender persons are allowed to change their legal gender. In the United Nations Human Rights Council's 2019 report on Bosnia and Herzegovina, the Human Rights Committee and the Committee Against Torture expressed concern at the lack of investigation by authorities of hate crimes committed towards lesbian, gay, bisexual and transgender people. Homophobia and violence and hate crimes against members of the LGBT community is widespread in Bosnia and Herzegovina. In September 2008, seven civilians and a police officer were injured by anti-LGBT protestors at the Queer Festival Sarajevo. The organisers of the festival received anonymous death threats leading up to the festival. Six people were hospitalised with head injuries and one of the attackers was detained by police. In September 2019 Bosnia's first LGBT pride parade was held in Sarajevo, the country's capital city. One thousand police officers were present to protect the attendees from violence and hate crimes. Counter-protests were held in Sarajevo by anti-LGBT groups at the same time as the Pride parade.

== Women’s rights ==
The Organisation for Security and Co-operation in Europe's Mission to Bosnia and Herzegovina reports that violence against women is a widespread problem in Bosnian society. The mission also reports that women are under-represented and marginalised in the private and public sectors. During the 1992-1995 Bosnian War, there was an epidemic of sexual violence. No official figures exist on the number of women who were sexually assaulted during the War, however estimates range between 20, 000 and 50, 000. The Bosnian legal system has been largely unresponsive in prosecuting men who committed sexual assault during the war. Victims risk losing large amounts of money in court fees if they sue the Republika Srpska for damages caused by sexual assaults committed by their soldiers during the war.

== International responses ==
The Organisation for Security and Co-operation in Europe is a prominent intergovernmental organisation that operates a mission in Bosnia and Herzegovina. They work to restore peace and harmony in the region and promote human rights for all citizens of Bosnia and Herzegovina, including the Roma and Jewish people. UN Women maintains an office in Bosnia and Herzegovina, where they aim to support the government in achieving global standards in gender equality.

== Historical situation ==
The following chart shows Bosnia and Herzegovina's ratings since 1992 in the Freedom in the World reports, published annually by Freedom House. A rating of 1 is "free"; 7, "not free".^{1}

Historical ratings

Year	Political Rights	Civil Liberties	Status	Presidents^{2}^{,}^{3}
1992	6	6	Not Free	Alija Izetbegović^{4}
1993	6	6	Not Free	Alija Izetbegović
1994	6	6	Not Free	Alija Izetbegović
1995	6	6	Not Free	Alija Izetbegović
1996	5	5	Partly Free	Alija Izetbegović
1997	5	5	Partly Free	Bosniak: Alija Izetbegović; Croat: Krešimir Zubak; Serb: Momčilo Krajišnik
1998	5	5	Partly Free	Bosniak: Alija Izetbegović; Croat: Krešimir Zubak; Serb: Momčilo Krajišnik
1999	5	5	Partly Free	Bosniak: Alija Izetbegović; Croat: Ante Jelavić; Serb: Živko Radišić
2000	5	4	Partly Free	Bosniak: Alija Izetbegović; Croat: Ante Jelavić; Serb: Živko Radišić
2001	5	4	Partly Free	Bosniak: Halid Genjac; Croat: Ante Jelavić; Serb: Živko Radišić
2002	4	4	Partly Free	Bosniak: Beriz Belkić; Croat: Jozo Križanović; Serb: Živko Radišić
2003	4	4	Partly Free	Bosniak: Sulejman Tihić; Croat: Željko Komšić; Serb: Mirko Šarović
2004	4	3	Partly Free	Bosniak: Sulejman Tihić; Croat: Željko Komšić; Serb: Borislav Paravac
2005	4	3	Partly Free	Bosniak: Sulejman Tihić; Croat: Željko Komšić; Serb: Borislav Paravac
2006	3	3	Partly Free	Bosniak: Sulejman Tihić; Croat: Željko Komšić; Serb: Borislav Paravac
2007	4	3	Partly Free	Bosniak: Haris Silajdžić; Croat: Željko Komšić; Serb: Nebojša Radmanović
2008	4	3	Partly Free	Bosniak: Haris Silajdžić; Croat: Željko Komšić; Serb: Nebojša Radmanović
2009	4	3	Partly Free	Bosniak: Haris Silajdžić; Croat: Željko Komšić; Serb: Nebojša Radmanović
2010	4	3	Partly Free	Bosniak: Haris Silajdžić; Croat: Željko Komšić; Serb: Nebojša Radmanović
2011	4	3	Partly Free	Bosniak: Bakir Izetbegović; Croat: Željko Komšić; Serb: Nebojša Radmanović
2012	3	3	Partly Free	Bosniak: Bakir Izetbegović; Croat: Željko Komšić; Serb: Nebojša Radmanović
2013	3	3	Partly Free	Bosniak: Bakir Izetbegović; Croat: Željko Komšić; Serb: Nebojša Radmanović
2014	4	3	Partly Free	Bosniak: Bakir Izetbegović; Croat: Željko Komšić; Serb: Nebojša Radmanović
2015	4	3	Partly Free	Bosniak: Bakir Izetbegović; Croat: Dragan Čović; Serb: Mladen Ivanić
2016	4	4	Partly Free	Bosniak: Bakir Izetbegović; Croat: Dragan Čović; Serb: Mladen Ivanić
2017	4	4	Partly Free	Bosniak: Bakir Izetbegović; Croat: Dragan Čović; Serb: Mladen Ivanić
2018	4	4	Partly Free	Bosniak: Bakir Izetbegović; Croat: Dragan Čović; Serb: Mladen Ivanić
2019	4	4	Partly Free	Bosniak: Šefik Džaferović; Croat: Željko Komšić; Serb: Milorad Dodik
2020	4	4	Partly Free	Bosniak: Šefik Džaferović; Croat: Željko Komšić; Serb: Milorad Dodik
2021	4	4	Partly Free	Bosniak: Šefik Džaferović; Croat: Željko Komšić; Serb: Milorad Dodik

== Notes ==
1. Note that the "Year" signifies the "Year covered". Therefore the information for the year marked 2008 is from the report published in 2009, and so on.
2. As of January 1.
3. Under the terms of the 1995 Dayton Agreement, the Presidency of Bosnia and Herzegovina is currently a triumvirate occupied by three elected representatives: one Bosniak, one Croat, and one Serb. The Bosniak and Croatian members of the presidency are elected as part of a joint constituency in the Federation of Bosnia and Herzegovina; the Serbian member is elected in Republika Srpska.
4. From 1992–1996, Alija Izetbegović served as President of the Presidency of the Republic of Bosnia and Herzegovina.
