= List of members of the Presidency of Bosnia and Herzegovina by time in office =

This is a list of members of the Presidency of Bosnia and Herzegovina since the country declared independence on 1 March 1992, ranked by the length of their combined terms in office.

To date, a total of 42 individuals have held office as members of the Presidency of Bosnia and Herzegovina, which has consisted of three members (one Bosniak, one Serb and one Croat) since 1996. From 1992 until the signing of the Dayton Agreement (which brought to an end the Bosnian War) the Presidency comprised seven members (two each for Bosniaks, Serbs and Croats and one member for "Others"); in addition due to the war taking place from 1992 until 1995 (and thus the existence of a state of imminent peril for the nation) three additional members were included in the membership of the Presidency: the Speaker of the Assembly, the Prime Minister and the Commander of the TORBiH General Headquarters (later the Commander of the TORBiH Staff, Chief of the ARBiH General Staff and Commander of the ARBiH Supreme Command Staff).

Five individuals have served non-consecutive terms as members of the Presidency: Stjepan Kljuić (both times as one of two Croat members), Momčilo Krajišnik (first as an additional member as the Speaker of the Parliamentary Assembly, and later as the Serb member), Haris Silajdžić (first as an additional member as Prime Minister, and later as the Bosniak member), Dragan Čović (both times as the Croat member) and Željko Komšić (both times as the Croat member).

== Members of the Presidency ==
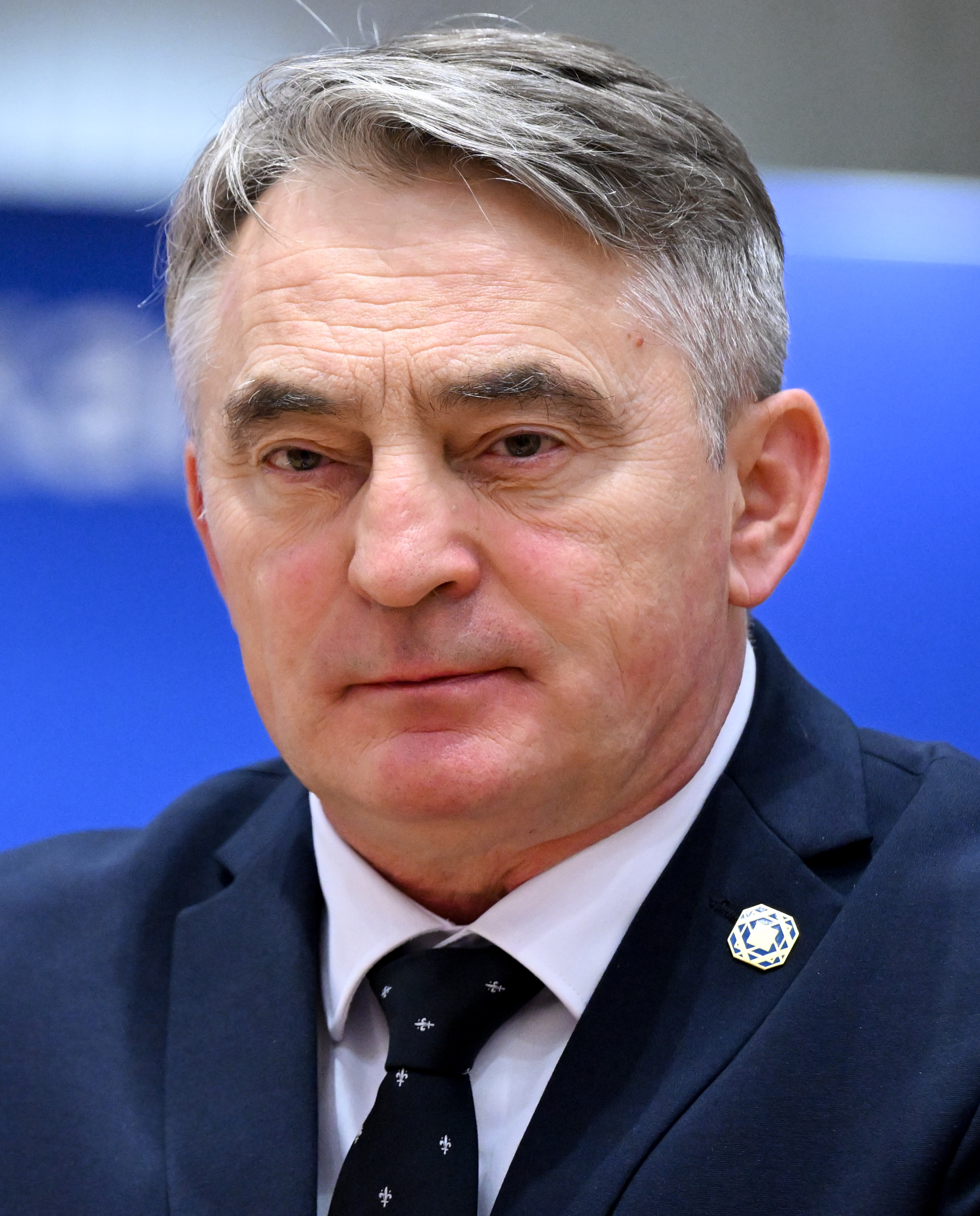
Željko Komšić is the longest serving Presidency member overall at 16 years in office

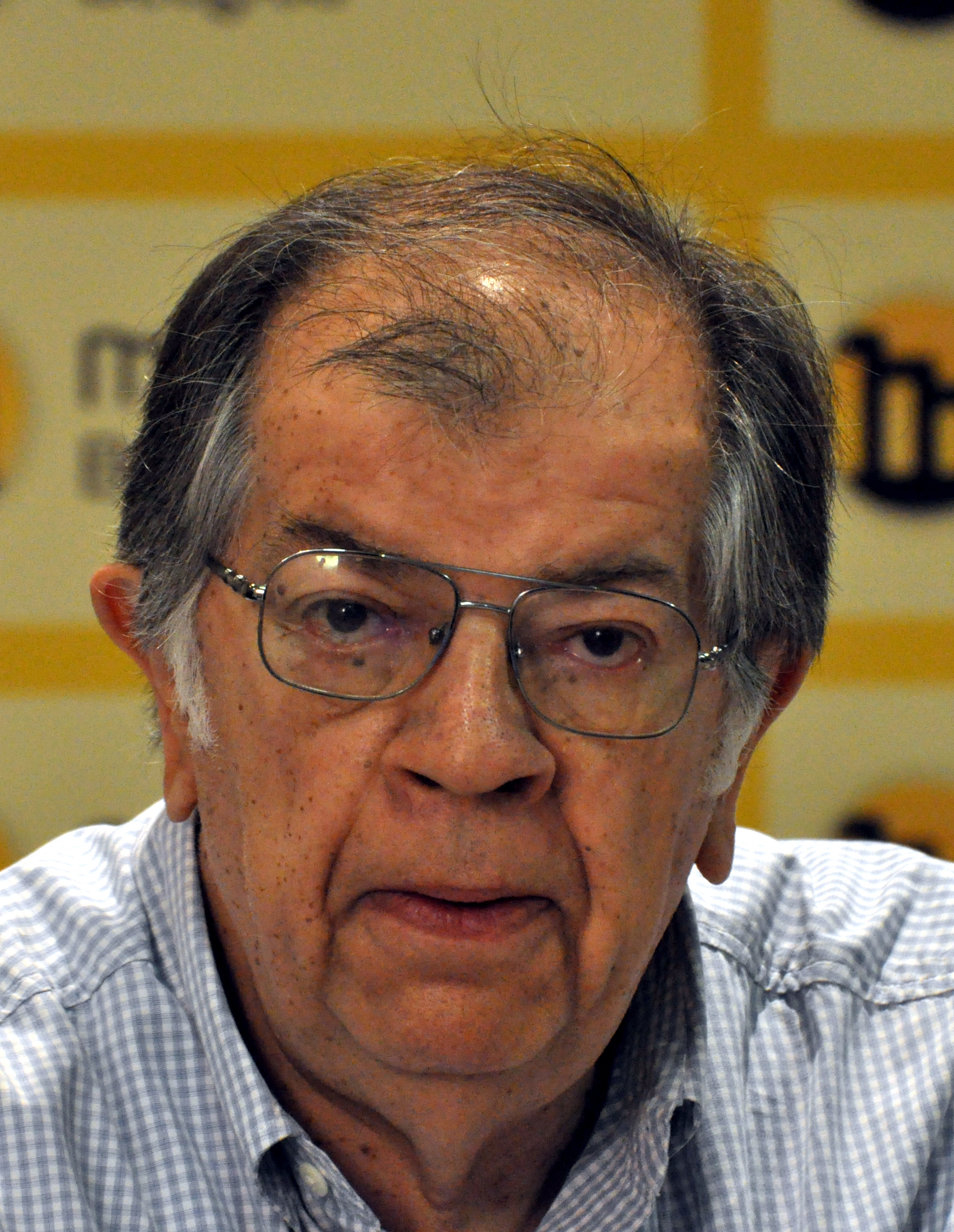
Nenad Kecmanović is the shortest serving Presidency member overall at just 19 days in office

Political parties:
Social Democratic Party (7)
Democratic Front (1)
Party of Democratic Action (8)
Alliance of Independent Social Democrats (3)
Croatian Democratic Union (11)
Party for Bosnia and Herzegovina (2)
Socialist Party (1)
Party of Democratic Progress (1)
Croatian Peasant Party (2)
Serb Democratic Party (5)
Independent (4)

	Presidency member	Incumbency	Years in power	Ethnicity represented
1	Željko Komšić	16 years, 7 days	2006–2014, 2018–2026	Croat
2	Alija Izetbegović	8 years, 227 days	1992–2000	Bosniak
3	Nebojša Radmanović	8 years, 11 days	2006–2014	Serb
4	Bakir Izetbegović	8 years, 10 days	2010–2018	Bosniak
5	Dragan Čović	6 years, 196 days	2002–2005, 2014–2018	Croat
6	Haris Silajdžić	6 years, 62 days	1993–1995, 2006–2010	Prime Minister (additional member) / Bosniak
7	Ejup Ganić	4 years, 218 days	1992–1996	Yugoslav (elected as "Others")
8	Mirko Pejanović	4 years, 110 days	1992–1996	Serb
9	Živko Radišić	4 years, 15 days	1998–2002	Serb
10	Sulejman Tihić	4 years, 9 days	2002–2006	Bosniak
(11)	Denis Bećirović	4 years, 5 days	2022–	Bosniak
(11)	Željka Cvijanović	4 years, 5 days	2022–	Serb
12	Mladen Ivanić	4 years, 3 days	2014–2018	Serb
13	Šefik Džaferović	3 years, 361 days	2018–2022	Bosniak
14	Milorad Dodik	3 years, 360 days	2018–2022	Serb
15	Tatjana Ljujić-Mijatović	3 years, 286 days	1992–1996	Serb
16	Stjepan Kljuić	3 years, 238 days	1992, 1993–1996	Croat
17	Borislav Paravac	3 years, 210 days	2003–2006	Serb
18	Miro Lazović	2 years, 362 days	1992–1995	Speaker of the Assembly (additional member)
(19)	Nijaz Duraković	2 years, 351 days	1993–1996	Bosniak
(19)	Ivo Komšić	2 years, 351 days	1993–1996	Croat
20	Rasim Delić	2 years, 197 days	1993–1995	Commander of the Supreme Command Staff of ARBiH (additional member)
21	Momčilo Krajišnik	2 years, 167 days	1992, 1996–1998	Speaker of the Assembly (additional member) / Serb
22	Ante Jelavić	2 years, 112 days	1998–2001	Croat
23	Krešimir Zubak	2 years, 41 days	1996–1998	Croat
24	Jozo Križanović	1 year, 235 days	2001–2002	Croat
(25)	Fikret Abdić	1 year, 233 days	1992–1993	Bosniak
(25)	Franjo Boras	1 year, 233 days	1992–1993	Croat
26	Beriz Belkić	1 year, 212 days	2001–2002	Bosniak
27	Ivo Miro Jović	1 year, 181 days	2005–2006	Croat
28	Sefer Halilović	1 year, 14 days	1992–1993	Commander of the TORBiH Staff / Chief of the ARBiH General Staff (additional member)
29	Mile Akmadžić	350 days	1992–1993	Prime Minister (additional member)
30	Miro Lasić	300 days	1992–1993	Croat
31	Jure Pelivan	215 days	1992	Prime Minister (additional member)
32	Halid Genjac	167 days	2000–2001	Bosniak
33	Mirko Šarović	156 days	2002–2003	Serb
34	Mariofil Ljubić	102 days	1992	Deputy Speaker of the Assembly (additional member)
35	Hasan Efendić	47 days	1992	Commander of the General Headquarters of TORBiH (additional member)
(36)	Biljana Plavšić	39 days	1992	Serb
(36)	Nikola Koljević	39 days	1992	Serb
37	Nenad Kecmanović	19 days	1992	Serb
38	Darijana Filipović	5 days	2026–	Croat

== See also ==
- Chairman of the Presidency of Bosnia and Herzegovina
  - List of members of the Presidency of Bosnia and Herzegovina
- List of heads of government of Bosnia and Herzegovina
- Parliamentary Assembly of Bosnia and Herzegovina

== Bibliography ==
- Šimić, Tomo (2006) Dokumenti predsjedništva Bosne i Hercegovine 1991.–1994. National security and the future, 8(3):9-227 (in Bosnian, Croatian and Serbian)
