= Martin Raguž =

Chairman of the Council of Ministers of Bosnia and Herzegovina from 2000 to 2001

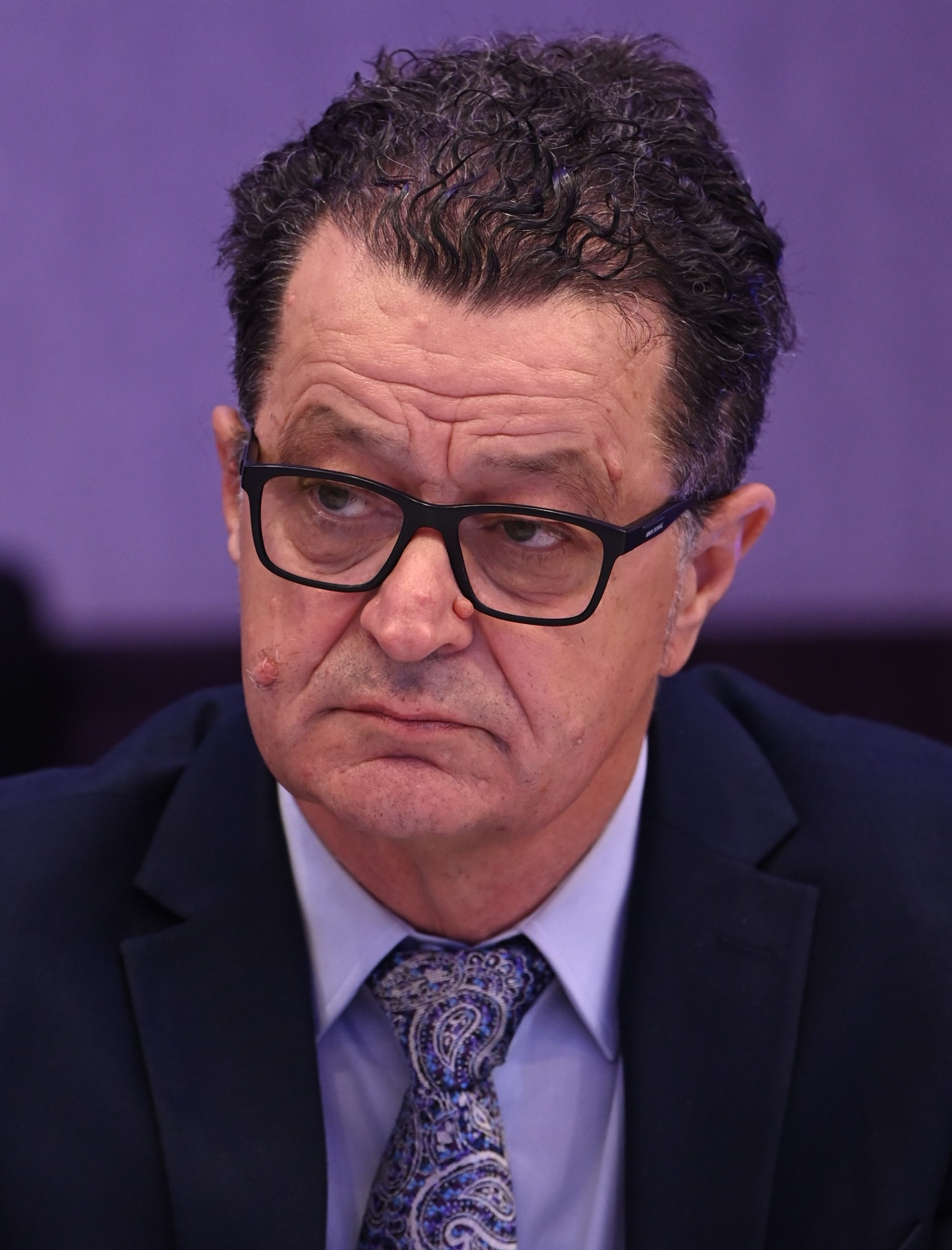
- Raguž in 2025

Chairman of the Council of Ministers of Bosnia and Herzegovina
- In office 18 October 2000 – 22 February 2001
- President: Halid Genjac; Ante Jelavić; Živko Radišić
- Preceded by: Spasoje Tuševljak
- Succeeded by: Božidar Matić
Ministerial offices
Minister of Human Rights and Refugees
In office 22 June 2000 – 22 February 2001
Prime Minister	Spasoje Tuševljak; Himself
Preceded by	Office established
Succeeded by	Krešimir Zubak
Federal Minister without portfolio
In office 15 December 1995 – 18 December 1996
Prime Minister	Haris Silajdžić; Izudin Kapetanović
Minister of Labour and Social Politicy
In office 3 March 1992 – 25 October 1993
Prime Minister	Jure Pelivan; Mile Akmadžić
Parliamentary offices
Member of the House of Peoples
In office 9 June 2011 – 28 February 2019
Member of the House of Representatives
In office 9 December 2002 – 30 November 2010
Constituency	2nd Electoral Unit

President of the Croatian Democratic Union 1990
- In office 6 July 2013 – 23 December 2015
- Preceded by: Božo Ljubić
- Succeeded by: Ilija Cvitanović

Personal details
- Born: 2 March 1958 (age 68) Stolac, PR Bosnia and Herzegovina, FPR Yugoslavia
- Party: Croatian Democratic Union 1990 (2006–present)
- Other political affiliations: Croatian Democratic Union (1993–2006); SSOJ (1992–1993); SKJ (1981–1992)
- Spouse: Marina Raguž
- Children: 5
- Education: University of Zagreb (BA)

Martin Raguž (born 2 March 1958) is a Bosnian Croat politician who served as Chairman of the Council of Ministers of Bosnia and Herzegovina from 2000 to 2001. He was a member of the national House of Peoples from 2011 to 2019, while previously he served in the House of Representatives from 2002 to 2010.

Raguž also served as the first minister of human rights and refugees from 2000 until 2001, and as the federal minister without portfolio from 1995 to 1996. He was also the minister of labour and social politicy from 1992 to 1993, during the Bosnian War. A member of the Croatian Democratic Union since 1993, Raguž left it to join its splinter party, the Croatian Democratic Union 1990. He later served as the party's president between 2013 and 2015.

== Early political career ==
Raguž became politically active at the time of 1990 general election, the first in the Socialist Republic of Bosnia and Herzegovina, then a part of Yugoslavia. He was one of the founders of the liberal-oriented BiH Union of Socialist Youth. He ran for the Croat member of the Presidency of the Socialist Republic of Bosnia and Herzegovina as a candidate of the SSO-H party. Of the seven Croatian candidates, Raguž finished last with a haul of 130,428 (6.13%) votes.

At the beginning of the Bosnian War in 1992, Raguž was appointed Minister of Labour and Social Policy for the Republic of Bosnia and Herzegovina, working in besieged Sarajevo. At the beginning of Croat–Bosniak War, he joined the Croatian Democratic Union (HDZ BiH) and accepted an invitation by the Croatian Republic of Herzeg-Bosnia to help mitigate the humanitarian crisis.

Raguž worked as the deputy head of the Office for Displaced Persons, Refugees and Displaced Persons until 1993, when he was appointed head of that office, replacing Darinka Tadić. He served until 1994, when it became the Ministry for Refugees and Social Affairs, where he worked as deputy minister until the end of the war in 1995.

== Post-war political career ==
After the war, Raguž was appointed federal minister without portfolio, where he remained until 1996, and was in charge of coordinating activities for the implementation of the Dayton Agreement. Between 1997 and 1998, he worked for the Croat member of the presidency, Krešimir Zubak. From 2000 until 2001, he served as minister of Human Rights and Refugees.

Following the 2000 parliamentary election, Raguž was appointed chairman of the Council of Ministers on 18 October 2000. He served in this capacity until 22 August 2001, when he was succeeded by Božidar Matić, a member of the Social Democratic Party. Raguž was then appointed Chairman of the Coordination Council.

After the High Representative Wolfgang Petritsch removed Ante Jelavić as the Croat member of the presidency, talks began about possible successors to Jelavić as president of the HDZ BiH. The international community, as a condition of returning to political home-rule, required the removal of all politicians who participated in the creation of the self-government. Although Raguž was also part of its establishment, the international community considered him to be acceptable as the new leader of the HDZ BiH. Ultimately, Bariša Čolak took over as party leader in May 2002.

=== April package ===
After the schism within the HDZ BiH, Raguž was one of the founders of the Croatian Democratic Union 1990 (HDZ 1990) led by Božo Ljubić. The schism occurred at the time of promoting constitutional changes under the April Package, to which Ljubić objected, arguing that the package reduced the status of the Croat people in the nation to the level of a national minority. During this period, Raguž was a member of the Constitutional-Legal Committee of the national House of Representatives.

Of the nine members of the committee, four supported the package, which was insufficient to forward the debate to the House of Representatives. Two board members were strongly opposed to the April Package, and the U.S. Embassy, the High Representative and other representatives of the international community attempted to influence Raguž and two other board members, Beriz Belkić and Filip Andrić, towards supporting the package. The committee decided to adopt the draft package for a hearing before the House of Representatives on 18 April 2006. Some opponents tried but failed to insert amendments to their parties' platforms, but Raguž, under pressure from the U.S. Embassy, did not support amendments from the HDZ 1990 in the debate.

=== HDZ 1990 ===
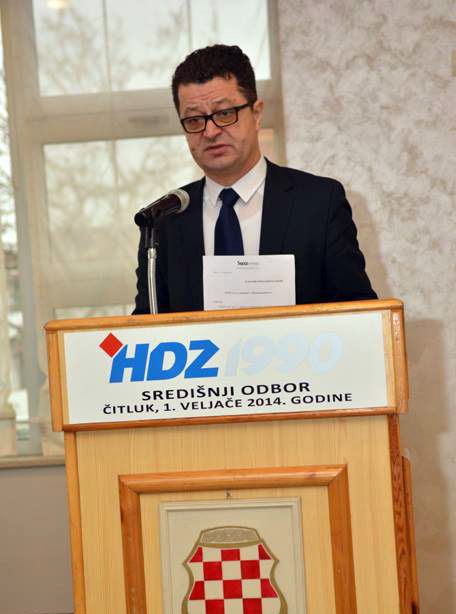
Raguž speaking at a HDZ 1990 Central Committee meeting in Čitluk, 1 February 2014

Croatian prime minister Ivo Sanader visited Mostar in March 2009, announcing the "inevitability" of unification of the HDZ BiH and the HDZ 1990. Subsequently, Raguž became a leading promoter of the unification of the two parties. However, his political ambitions distanced him from his party colleagues. In April, the HDZ 1990 presidency adopted a platform for unification with the HDZ BiH providing equal representation in government. However, HDZ BiH president Dragan Čović rejected the possibility of unification in early May 2009, compounded by HDZ 1990 officials being at risk of losing their positions in the event of reunification.

In July 2013, Raguž succeeded Božo Ljubić as president of the HDZ 1990. In March 2014, he called for the federalization of Bosnia and Herzegovina. His call was welcomed by former High Representative Christian Schwarz-Schilling. In a meeting with the director of the Department of South and Central Europe of the U.S. State Department, Raguž advocated for greater impact of the United States on Bosnia and Hercegovinu.

==== 2014 presidential campaign ====
On 5 July 2014, Raguž accepted the nomination of the HDZ 1990 for the Croat member of the Presidency of Bosnia and Herzegovina in the October general election. His nomination marked a deepening of the conflict within the Croatian National Assembly. The cornerstone of Raguž's policy was cooperation with the European Union. Raguž's campaign received support from the First Bosnian party, whose president Šeherzada Delić announced official support for Raguž in the election.

Raguž failed to get elected, obtaining 38.60% of the vote, while HDZ BiH leader Dragan Čović won with 52.20%.

==== Resignation ====
In December 2015, the West Herzegovina Canton HDZ 1990 board requested that Raguž resign because of "the general inactivity and inaction of the party and the party's deteriorating situation on the ground." He consequently resigned on 23 December, citing health problems, including spinal issues.

Political offices
Preceded by Spasoje Tuševljak	Chairman of the Council of Ministers of Bosnia and Herzegovina; 2000–2001	Succeeded by Božidar Matić
