= 2001 in Romania =

- Decades: 1980s; 1990s; 2000s; 2010s; 2020s
- See also: Other events of 2001; History of Romania; Timeline of Romanian history; Years in Romania

Events from the year 2001 in Romania.

== Incumbents ==
- President: Ion Iliescu
- Prime Minister: Adrian Năstase

== Events ==
- 29 May – The president of the Constitutional Court, Lucian Mihai, announces his resignation.
- 7 June – The resignation of Lucian Mihai from the Constitutional Court goes into effect.
- 6 August – An explosion occurs at the Vulcan mine.
- 10 October – President Iliescu promulgates Law on Free Access to Information of Public Interest (Romanian: Legea privind liberul acces la informațiile de interes public).
- 30 October – A Romanian government commission reveals corruption in the international adoption business.
- 29 November – The Senate approves the stripping of political immunity of Corneliu Vadim Tudor for spreading misinformation. The voting session had 88 votes in favour and 2 against.

=== Full date unknown ===
- Oscar Downstream, an oil & gas trading company is founded.

== Births ==
=== January ===
- 15 January – Alexandra Agiurgiuculese, Romanian-Italian rhythmic gymnast

=== February ===
- 8 February – Laurențiu Ardelean, footballer.

== Deaths ==
=== January ===
- 1 January - Constantin Rădulescu, 76, Romanian doctor, footballer and manager.

=== February ===
- 17 February - Richard Wurmbrand, 91, Evangelical Lutheran priest, and professor.

=== March ===
- 20 March - Ilie Verdeț, 51st prime minister of Romania (b. 1925)

=== July ===
- 15 July - Marina Știrbei, 89, Romanian aviator.

=== August ===
- 1 August - Nicolae Tătaru, 69, Romanian football player.

=== November ===
- 14 November - Zigu Ornea, 71, Romanian literary critic, biographer and book publisher, failed surgery.

=== December ===
- 21 December - Ovidiu Iacov, 20, Romanian footballer, car accident.

== See also ==
- 2001 in Europe
