= Božidar Matić =

Bosnian politician and academic (1937–2016)

Chairman of the Council of Ministers of Bosnia and Herzegovina
- In office 22 February 2001 – 18 July 2001
- President: See list: Halid Genjac Beriz Belkić Živko Radišić Ante Jelavić Jozo Križanović
- Preceded by: Martin Raguž
- Succeeded by: Zlatko Lagumdžija
Ministerial offices
Minister of Finance and Treasury
In office 22 February 2001 – 17 July 2001
Prime Minister	Himself
Preceded by	Spasoje Tuševljak
Succeeded by	Anto Domazet
Additional positions
President of the Academy of Sciences and Arts of Bosnia and Herzegovina
In office 1999–2014
Preceded by	Seid Huković
Succeeded by	Miloš Trifković
Rector of the University of Sarajevo
In office 1981–1985
Preceded by	Arif Tanović
Succeeded by	Ljubomir Berberović

Personal details
- Born: 8 September 1937 Bogatić, Kingdom of Yugoslavia
- Died: 12 May 2016 (aged 78) Sarajevo, Bosnia and Herzegovina
- Party: Social Democratic Party (1992–2016)
- Other political affiliations: SKJ (until 1990)
- Spouse: Vesna Matić
- Education: University of Zagreb (BS); University of Belgrade (MS); University of Sarajevo (PhD)

Božidar Matić (pronounced [bǒʒidar mǎːtitɕ]; 8 September 1937 – 12 May 2016) was a Bosnian politician and academic who served as Chairman of the Council of Ministers of Bosnia and Herzegovina from February to July 2001. Additionally, he was Minister of Finance and Treasury during that period as well.

While a member of the League of Communists of Yugoslavia, Matić was rector of the University of Sarajevo from 1981 to 1985, and was also the director of Energoinvest. He was later member of the Social Democratic Party from 1992 until his death in 2016, and was also the longest-serving president of the Academy of Sciences and Arts of Bosnia and Herzegovina from 1999 to 2014.

== Early life and education ==
Matić was born in Bogatić, Kingdom of Yugoslavia, present-day Serbia on 8 September 1937, but moved to present-day Bosnia and Herzegovina early in his childhood. He attended elementary and high school in Visoko. His subsequent education was at the University of Zagreb, where he earned a BS in 1960. He earned an MS at the University of Belgrade in 1963, and finally a PhD at the University of Sarajevo in 1971. Matić was part of a large engineering team which worked on the project of the electrification of the Sarajevo–Ploče railway in the 1960s and 1970s.

== Career ==
Matić was a member of the League of Communists of Yugoslavia until 1990, during which he was an official in the Federal Executive Council. He was rector of the University of Sarajevo between 1981 and 1985. Matić worked for many years at Energoinvest, the largest company in Yugoslavia at the time, and was later its director. Following the breakup of Yugoslavia and the independence of Bosnia and Herzegovina, he became a member of the Social Democratic Party (SDP BiH) in 1992.

Following the 2000 parliamentary election, the SDP BiH formed a coalition with the Party for Bosnia and Herzegovina to gain a majority and force the nationalist parties out of power. They gathered a coalition of many other small parties to create the "Alliance for Change". Matić became Chairman of the Council of Ministers and Minister of Finance and Treasury on 22 February 2001. The SDP BiH-led government facilitated the passage of the Election Law, which was not only an important step towards democracy, but also a prerequisite to Bosnia's accession to the Council of Europe. He served in both offices until July 2001.

Matić was president of the Academy of Sciences and Arts of Bosnia and Herzegovina from 1999 until June 2014 as well.

== Death ==
Matić died on 12 May 2016 in Sarajevo, Bosnia and Herzegovina at the age of 78. He was buried in Sarajevo at the Bare Cemetery on 14 May, two days after his death.

Political offices
Preceded by Martin Raguž	Chairman of the Council of Ministers of Bosnia and Herzegovina; 2001	Succeeded by Zlatko Lagumdžija
Preceded by Spasoje Tuševljak	Minister of Finance and Treasury; 2001	Succeeded by Anto Domazet
