= Spasoje Tuševljak =

Chairman of the Council of Ministers of Bosnia and Herzegovina in 2000

- Спасоје Тушевљак

Chairman of the Council of Ministers of Bosnia and Herzegovina
- In office 6 June 2000 – 18 October 2000
- President: See list: Alija Izetbegović Halid Genjac Živko Radišić Ante Jelavić
- Preceded by: Haris Silajdžić and Svetozar Mihajlović (as Co-Chairmen)
- Succeeded by: Martin Raguž
Ministerial offices
Minister of Finance and Treasury
In office 22 June 2000 – 22 February 2001
Prime Minister	Himself; Martin Raguž
Preceded by	Office established
Succeeded by	Božidar Matić

Personal details
- Born: 28 May 1952 (age 73) Trnovo, SR Bosnia and Herzegovina, SFR Yugoslavia
- Party: Serb Democratic Party

Spasoje Tuševljak (Serbian Cyrillic: Спасоје Тушевљак; born 28 May 1952) is a Bosnian Serb economist and former politician who served as Chairman of the Council of Ministers of Bosnia and Herzegovina from June to October 2000. Tuševljak was also Minister of Finance and Treasury from 2000 to 2001.

== Biography ==
Tuševljak is a professor at the Faculty of Economy in East Sarajevo. At the beginning of the Bosnian War, he managed affairs between Republika Srpska and FR Yugoslavia. As Tuševljak had good relations with the Government of Republika Srpska, he was named a chief negotiator in the question of legal succession of the SFR Yugoslavia.

Tuševljak was named the first Chairman of the Council of Ministers of Bosnia and Herzegovina as a member of the Serb Democratic Party. He held office between June and October 2000. He was the Minister of Finance and Treasury from June 2000 until February 2001.

Political offices
Preceded by Haris Silajdžić; Svetozar Mihajlović (as Co-Chairmen)	Chairman of the Council of Ministers of Bosnia and Herzegovina; 2000	Succeeded by Martin Raguž
Preceded by Office established	Minister of Finance and Treasury; 2000–2001	Succeeded by Božidar Matić
