= Amir Zukić (politician) =

Bosnian politician (born 1966)

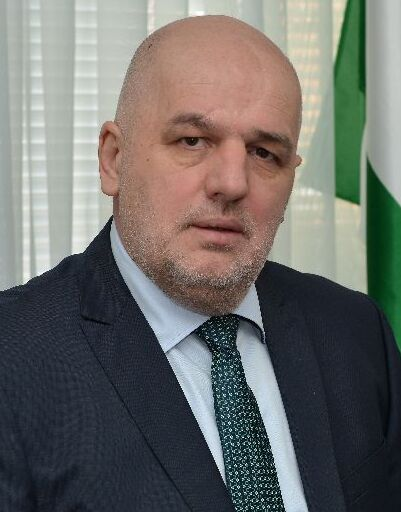
- Zukić in 2016

General Secretary of the Party of Democratic Action
- In office 2005 – 24 March 2018
- Preceded by: Šefik Džaferović
- Succeeded by: Halid Genjac

Personal details
- Born: 8 August 1966 (age 59) Rogatica, SR Bosnia and Herzegovina, SFR Yugoslavia
- Party: Party of Democratic Action
- Spouse: Elma Zukić
- Children: 2
- Education: University of Sarajevo (LLB, LLM)

Amir Zukić (born 8 August 1966) is a Bosnian politician who served as the general secretary of the Party of Democratic Action (SDA) from 2005 to 2018. He was a member of both the Federal House of Peoples and Federal House of Representatives as a representative of the SDA.

In May 2020, Zukić was subject to a travel ban by the United States for his involvement in "corrupt practices". A trial is ongoing since 2017 for illegal employment for people in public companies in exchange for money.

== Personal life and education ==
Zukić was born in Rogatica, SFR Yugoslavia, present-day Bosnia and Herzegovina in 1966. He holds a law degree from the Faculty of Law at the University of Sarajevo.

He is married to Elma Zukić and together they have two sons. They live in Sarajevo.
