= Oscar Downstream =

Romanian fuel distribution and oil & gas trading company

- Type: Private
- Industry: Energy, Oil
- Founded: 2001
- Founder: Alin Niculae
- Headquarters: Ilfov, Romania
- Products: Oil & Gas, Downstream (Fuel Distribution)
- Revenue: €1,445 million (2022)
- Net income: 80,425,404 euro (2022)
- Number of employees: 488 (2022)
- Website: oscars.ro

Oscar Downstream is an oil & gas trading company based in Ilfov, Romania active at national level. Oscar is currently the largest independent Romanian fuel distribution company and one of top 5 players in the oil & gas Romanian downstream market.

The company’s portfolio includes a network of over 100 fuel stations that covers the main commercial routes in the country through its own two brands, RO concept OSCAR (a gas station network, developed by OSCAR as a franchise) and DIESELpoint Access (exclusively B2B, accessed with the OSCAR fleet card), over 2500 in-house fueling stations active at B2B clients at national level, a modern and extended logistics infrastructure.

The company invested over 50 million euros in the last years to develop an integrated logistic chain for the fuel distribution. It has its own network of 7 warehouses across the country with a fuel storage capacity of 65.000 m³ and a fleet of over 80 fuel trucks. The company has 4 Greenfield investments in Șercaia (Brașov County), Ocna Mureș (Alba County), Roman (Neamț County), Zădăreni (Arad County) and 3 other storage facilities in Fundulea (Călărași County), Craiova (Dolj County) and Constanța. The products portfolio includes fuel (diesel and gasoline), AdBlue, bitumen and lubricants.

== History ==
=== 2004 ===
OSCAR Downstream was the first to introduce on the Romanian market the in-house fueling station, DIESELpoint concept and service , covering the southern region of the country. This became the main growth driver of the company, extending now to a national coverage of more than 2500 active DIESELpoint fueling stations at B2B clients, used as a fueling point on the companies premises.

=== 2007 ===
The company bought its first fuel truck, having in mind the development of its own integrated logistic chain. Today it includes 77 fuels trucks.

=== 2010 ===
The company launched a new service concept, DIESELpoint Access, automated transit fuel stations dedicated to B2B, located on the main commercial routes and easily accessible with the OSCAR fleet card. The DIESELpoint network now consists of 31 stations.

=== 2014 ===
OSCAR Downstream ranked 5th in top 5 players on the oil & gas downstream market in Romania.

=== 2016 ===
OSCAR develops a new service, DIESELpoint Plus, a combination between the 20,000 L in-house fueling station and the fleet card system, accessible with the OSCAR fuel card. It is a premium service for companies that need a complex fueling solution on their own premises.

The company received its first True Leaders award for „The best Romanian Oil & Gas company” by ICAP Romania, for simultaneously fulfilling 4 criteria: profitability, an increased number of employees in 2015 vs 2014, leader in their industry, ICAP credit score: A2.

=== 2017 ===
OSCAR won 3 awards:

- The international World Finance Awards for „The Best Downstream Company in Eastern Europe”
- The Business Champions award Business Champions for Romania for companies with turnover larger than 15 million Euros
- The True Leaders award by ICAP Romania, for the second time in two consecutive years

The end of 2017 came with the first B2C station, under the name RO, a fuel network franchise brand developed by OSCAR' together with 4 new fuel types in the OSCAR’s portfolio under the name ACTIS and FORTIS, superior fuels developed for B2C. The RO franchise brand was developed to complete the DIESELpoint Access network, with additional services and products. The RO network now has 56 gas stations in Romania.

=== 2018 ===
- expanded the fleet card portfolio releasing 3 new card types and 3 new branded fuels
- integrated a complete image rebranding

=== 2021 ===
OSCAR celebrated 20 years on the Romanian market, - reached 85 stations in the OSCAR network with its own two brands, RO concept OSCAR (54 stations) and DIESELpoint Access (31 stations), - reached a total fuel storage capacity of over 65.000 cbm after the modernization and expansion of the Sercaia warehouse, one of the 7 OSCAR fuel warehouses

=== 2023 ===
- was found “The best performing oil & gas company” according to Randstad Employer Brand 2023 study
