= List of members of the Presidency of Bosnia and Herzegovina =

This article lists the members of the Presidency of Bosnia and Herzegovina since the country's new Constitution from December 1995, adopted following the Dayton Agreement. The Presidency of Bosnia and Herzegovina is composed of three members, each member representing one of three constitutive nations of Bosnia and Herzegovina: Bosniaks, Croats (elected from the Federation) and Serbs (elected from Republika Srpska).

== List ==
=== Bosniak members ===
Party of Democratic Action (5)
Party for Bosnia and Herzegovina (2)
Social Democratic Party (1)

Portrait	Name (Birth–Death)	Term of office			Political party	Election
Portrait	Name (Birth–Death)	Took office	Left office	Time in office	Political party	Election
1	Alija Izetbegović (1925–2003)	5 October 1996	14 October 2000	4 years, 9 days	SDA	1996 – 730,592 votes (80.00%); 1998 – 511,541 votes (86.80%)
2	Halid Genjac (born 1958)	14 October 2000	30 March 2001	167 days	SDA	–
3	Beriz Belkić (1946–2023)	30 March 2001	28 October 2002	1 year, 212 days	SBiH	–
4	Sulejman Tihić (1951–2014)	28 October 2002	6 November 2006	4 years, 9 days	SDA	2002 – 192,661 votes (37.29%)
5	Haris Silajdžić (born 1945)	6 November 2006	10 November 2010	4 years, 4 days	SBiH	2006 – 350,520 votes (62.80%)
6	Bakir Izetbegović (born 1956)	10 November 2010	20 November 2018	8 years, 10 days	SDA	2010 – 162,831 votes (34.86%); 2014 – 247,235 votes (32.87%)
7	Šefik Džaferović (born 1957)	20 November 2018	16 November 2022	3 years, 361 days	SDA	2018 – 212,581 votes (36.61%)
8	Denis Bećirović (born 1975)	16 November 2022	Incumbent	4 years, 0 days	SDP BiH	2022 – 330,238 votes (57.37%); 2026 – 222,484 votes (38.10%)

=== Croat members ===
Croatian Democratic Union (5)
Social Democratic Party (2)
Democratic Front (1)

Portrait	Name (Birth–Death)	Term of office			Political party	Election
Portrait	Name (Birth–Death)	Took office	Left office	Time in office	Political party	Election
1	Krešimir Zubak (born 1947)	5 October 1996	15 November 1998	2 years, 41 days	HDZ BiH	1996 – 330,477 votes (88.70%)
2	Ante Jelavić (born 1963)	15 November 1998	7 March 2001	2 years, 112 days	HDZ BiH	1998 – 189,438 votes (52.91%)
3	Jozo Križanović (1944–2009)	7 March 2001	28 October 2002	1 year, 235 days	SDP BiH	–
4	Dragan Čović (born 1956)	28 October 2002	9 May 2005	2 years, 193 days	HDZ BiH	2002 – 114,606 votes (61.52%)
5	Ivo Miro Jović (born 1950)	9 May 2005	6 November 2006	1 year, 181 days	HDZ BiH	–
6	Željko Komšić (born 1964)	6 November 2006	17 November 2014	8 years, 11 days	SDP BiH (until 2012)	2006 – 116,062 votes (40.0%); 2010 – 337,065 votes (60.61%)
	Željko Komšić (born 1964)	6 November 2006	17 November 2014	8 years, 11 days	DF (from 2013)	2006 – 116,062 votes (40.0%); 2010 – 337,065 votes (60.61%)
(4)	Dragan Čović (born 1956)	17 November 2014	20 November 2018	4 years, 3 days	HDZ BiH	2014 – 128,053 votes (52.20%)
(6)	Željko Komšić (born 1964)	20 November 2018	16 November 2026	7 years, 361 days	DF	2018 – 225,500 votes (52.64%); 2022 – 227,540 votes (55.80%)
7	Darijana Filipović (born 1987)	16 November 2026	Incumbent	0 days	HDZ BiH	2026 – 120,701 votes (47.28%)

=== Serb members ===
Serb Democratic Party (3)
Socialist Party (1)
Alliance of Independent Social Democrats (3)
Party of Democratic Progress (1)

Portrait	Name (Birth–Death)	Term of office			Political party	Election
Portrait	Name (Birth–Death)	Took office	Left office	Time in office	Political party	Election
1	Momčilo Krajišnik (1945–2020)	5 October 1996	13 October 1998	2 years, 8 days	SDS	1996 – 690,646 votes (67.30%)
2	Živko Radišić (1937–2021)	13 October 1998	28 October 2002	4 years, 15 days	SP	1998 – 359,937 votes (51.31%)
3	Mirko Šarović (born 1956)	28 October 2002	2 April 2003	156 days	SDS	2002 – 180,212 votes (35.52%)
4	Borislav Paravac (1943–2026)	10 April 2003	6 November 2006	3 years, 210 days	SDS	–
5	Nebojša Radmanović (born 1949)	6 November 2006	17 November 2014	8 years, 11 days	SNSD	2006 – 287,675 votes (53.30%); 2010 – 295,629 votes (48.92%)
6	Mladen Ivanić (born 1958)	17 November 2014	20 November 2018	4 years, 3 days	PDP	2014 – 318,196 votes (48.71%)
7	Milorad Dodik (born 1959)	20 November 2018	15 November 2022	3 years, 360 days	SNSD	2018 – 368,210 votes (53.88%)
8	Željka Cvijanović (born 1967)	16 November 2022	Incumbent	4 years, 0 days	SNSD	2022 – 327,720 votes (51.65%); 2026 – 319,705 votes (55.57%)

== Timelines ==
The following graphical lifespan timelines of members of the Presidency of Bosnia and Herzegovina are split between the Bosniak, Croat, and Serb members. They are listed in order of first assuming the office.

== See also ==
- Chairman of the Presidency of Bosnia and Herzegovina
  - List of members of the Presidency by time in office
- Triumvirate
