= Ante Jelavić =

Bosnian Croat politician (born 1963)

Chairman of the Presidency of Bosnia and Herzegovina
- In office 15 June 1999 – 14 February 2000
- Preceded by: Živko Radišić
- Succeeded by: Alija Izetbegović

Croat member of the Presidency of Bosnia and Herzegovina
- In office 15 November 1998 – 7 March 2001
- Prime Minister: Spasoje Tuševljak Martin Raguž Božidar Matić
- Preceded by: Krešimir Zubak
- Succeeded by: Jozo Križanović
Ministerial offices
Federal Minister of Defence
In office 18 December 1996 – 13 October 1998
Prime Minister	Edhem Bičakčić
Preceded by	Jadranko Prlić
Succeeded by	Miroslav Prce
Additional positions
President of the Croatian National Assembly
In office 28 October 2000 – 4 May 2002
Preceded by	Office established
Succeeded by	Dragan Čović
President of the Croatian Democratic Union
In office 17 May 1998 – 4 May 2002
Preceded by	Božo Rajić
Succeeded by	Bariša Čolak

Personal details
- Born: 21 August 1963 (age 63) Vrgorac, SR Croatia, SFR Yugoslavia
- Party: Croatian Democratic Union

Military service
- Allegiance: Yugoslavia (1986–1991) Croatia (1991) Herzeg-Bosnia (1991–1996) Federation of Bosnia and Herzegovina (1996)
- Branch/service: Yugoslav People's Army 1986–1991) Croatian National Guard (1991) Croatian Defence Council (1991–1996) Army of the Federation of Bosnia and Herzegovina (1996)
- Years of service: 1991–1996
- Rank: (Federation of Bosnia and Herzegovina) Colonel General (Croatian Republic of Herzeg-Bosnia) Colonel General (Croatia) Major General
- Unit: Croatian Defence Council
- Commands: Croatian Defence Council
- Battles/wars: Bosnian War Croatian War of Independence
- Awards: Order of Nikola Šubić Zrinski Order of Ban Jelačić Order of the Croatian Trefoil Homeland's Gratitude Medal

Ante Jelavić (born 21 August 1963) is a Bosnian Croat politician who served as the Croat member of the Presidency of Bosnia and Herzegovina from 1998 to 2001. He was the youngest person to hold the office of Presidency member and also the youngest Presidency member at the end of his tenure.

Jelavić previously served as the Federal Minister of Defence from 1996 to 1998. He was also president of the Croatian Democratic Union from 1998 to 2002.

== Presidency (1998–2001) ==
At the 1998 general election, Jelavić was elected to the Presidency of Bosnia and Herzegovina, having obtained 52.91% of the vote. The Social Democratic Party candidate, Gradimir Gojer, was second with 31.83%. Taking office at the age of 35, he was the youngest person to hold the office of Presidency member.

On 7 March 2001, Jelavić was removed from office by the High Representative for Bosnia and Herzegovina, Wolfgang Petritsch. Petritsch justified his decision by observing that Jelavić had "directly violated the constitutional order of the Federation of Bosnia and Herzegovina and of Bosnia and Herzegovina"; in particular he cited Jelavić's leading role in the 'Croatian National Assembly' rally in Mostar on 3 March 2001, calling for a separate governing entity for Bosnian Croats.

== Investigations and indictments ==
On 22 January 2004, Jelavić was arrested in his home in Mostar, on charges of corruption. On 4 November 2005, the Court of Bosnia and Herzegovina in Sarajevo found Jelavić guilty of abuse of office, embezzlement of office, and lack of commitment in office. The findings of guilt related, in part, to the use of funds from the Federal Ministry of Defence to purchase shares in banking and insurance firms Hercegovačka Banka and Herzegovina Osiguranje. Judge Malcolm Simmons presided, A sentence of ten years imprisonment was subsequently pronounced, although Jelavić was not present at the sentencing hearing and remained at large.

His attorney, Dragan Barbarić, acting in his client's absence, initiated a successful appeal against the first instance verdict on the grounds that it lacked proper factual description of the offence and as such was in violation of criminal procedural law. On 4 July 2006, with the verdict revoked, the appeal panel, presided over by Judge Nedžad Popovac, called for new proceedings in which evidence presented at the first trial will be re-presented and in which new evidence may also be presented.

Party political offices
Preceded by Božo Rajić	President of the Croatian Democratic Union; 1998–2002	Succeeded by Bariša Čolak
Political offices
Preceded by Krešimir Zubak	Croat member of the Presidency of Bosnia and Herzegovina; 1998–2001	Succeeded by Jozo Križanović
Preceded by Živko Radišić	Chairman of the Presidency of Bosnia and Herzegovina; 1999–2000	Succeeded by Alija Izetbegović
