= Šefik Džaferović =

Bosnian politician (born 1957)

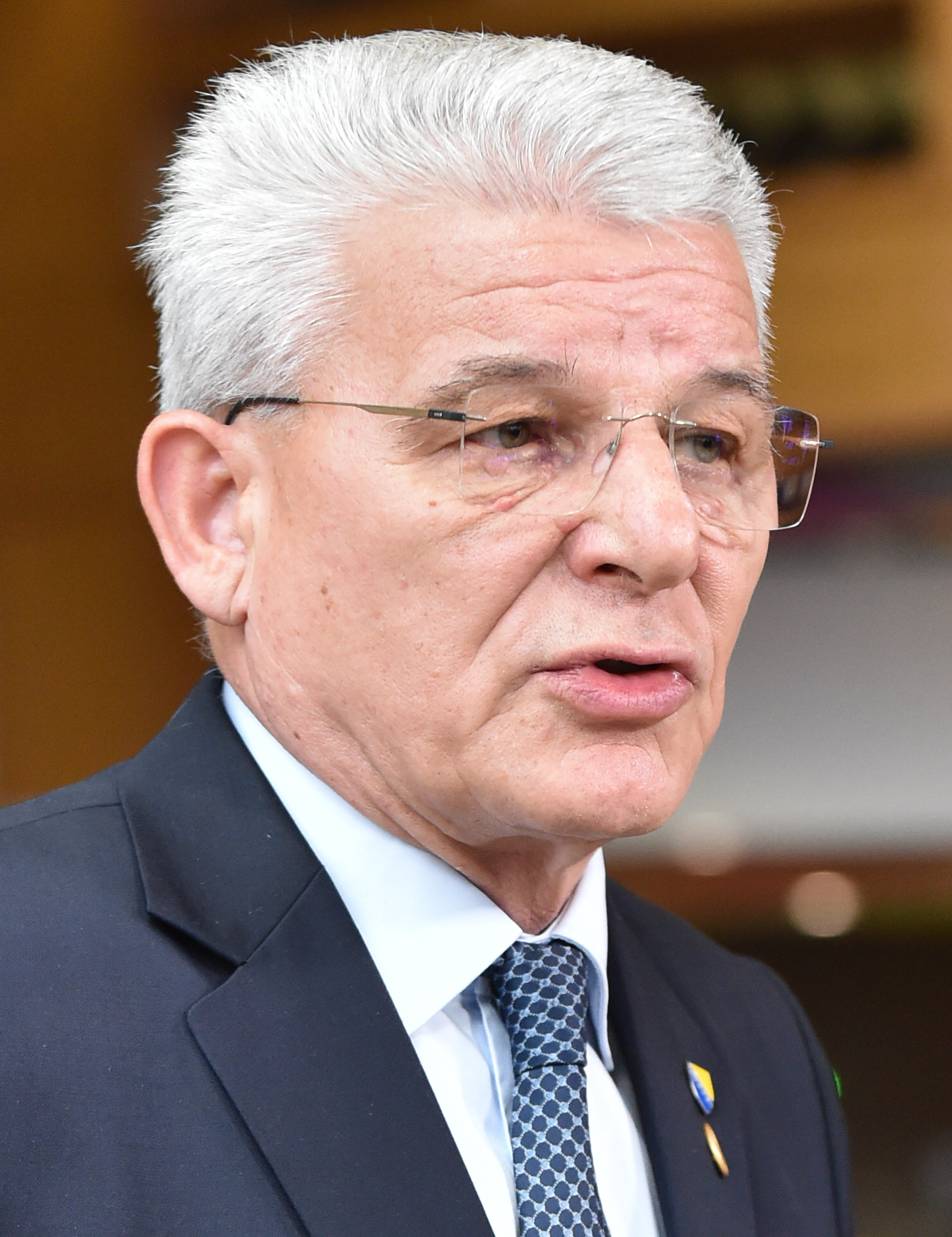
- Džaferović in 2022

Bosniak member of the Presidency of Bosnia and Herzegovina
- In office 20 November 2018 – 16 November 2022 (Note: Serving as the Chairman of the Presidency from 20 March 2020 to 20 November 2020, and from 20 March 2022 to 16 November 2022.)
- Prime Minister: Denis Zvizdić; Zoran Tegeltija
- Preceded by: Bakir Izetbegović
- Succeeded by: Denis Bećirović

Member of the House of Peoples
- Incumbent
- Assumed office 16 February 2023
- In office 20 March 2001 – 31 January 2003
Parliamentary offices
Member of the House of Representatives
In office 9 December 2002 – 20 November 2018
Constituency	4th Electoral Unit
Additional positions
General Secretary of the Party of Democratic Action
In office 2001–2005
Preceded by	Timur Numić
Succeeded by	Amir Zukić

Personal details
- Born: 9 September 1957 (age 69) Zavidovići, PR Bosnia and Herzegovina, FPR Yugoslavia
- Party: Party of Democratic Action (1990–present)
- Spouse: Vildana Džaferović (m. 1980)
- Children: 2
- Education: University of Sarajevo (LLB)

Šefik Džaferović N.Pk (Serbo-Croatian Cyrillic: Шефик Џаферовић; born 9 September 1957) is a Bosnian politician who served as the Bosniak member of the Presidency of Bosnia and Herzegovina from 2018 to 2022. He has been serving as member of the national House of Peoples since 2023. A member of the Party of Democratic Action (SDA), he was formerly its vice president and general secretary.

Džaferović graduated from the Faculty of Law at the University of Sarajevo in 1979. Before entering politics, he worked in judicial institutions. Having joined the SDA following its formation in 1990, Džaferović was appointed member of the Federal House of Peoples in 1996. In 2001, he became a member of the national House of Peoples. In the 2002 general election, Džaferović was elected to the national House of Representatives, and served as its member until 2018.

From 2018 until 2022, Džaferović served in the Bosnian Presidency as its Bosniak member, having been elected in the 2018 general election by a narrow margin. Choosing not to seek re-election in the 2022 general election, he once again became a member of the national House of Peoples in February 2023.

== Early life and education ==
Džaferović was born in 1957 in the Bosnian town of Zavidovići in the former Yugoslavia, modern-day Bosnia and Herzegovina. He went to a Gymnasium in Zavidovići. After that, he graduated from the Faculty of Law at the University of Sarajevo in 1979. Džaferović worked in judicial institutions and for the police department in Zavidovići and Zenica until 1996.

== Political career ==
In 1996, Džaferović was elected to the Assembly of Zenica-Doboj Canton. In the same year, he became a delegate in the Federal House of Peoples. Four years later, he entered the national House of Peoples. In the 2002 general election, he was elected to the national House of Representatives. In the 2014 general election, Džaferović was re-elected for a third time to the national House of Representatives with 30,000 votes. While in the House of Representatives, he served as its chairman on multiple occasions.

Following the 2010 general election, a governmental formation crisis ensued. Despite the political stalemate in the formation of a new government, between October 2010 and March 2012, Parliament continued talks in the framework of a "Joint Ad Hoc Committee for the Implementation of the judgment of the European Court of Human Rights in the case of Sejdić and Finci v. Bosnia and Herzegovina", composed of 11 MPs from the House of Representatives and 2 MPs from the House of Peoples, headed by Džaferović. While the committee agreed to add 3 representatives of the "Others" to the national House of Peoples (two elected from the Federation of Bosnia and Herzegovina and one from Republika Srpska), no solution was found for the Presidency, with Bosnian Serbs insisting for direct election of their member, and Bosnian Croats calling for either indirect election or a separate constituency to avoid future Komšić cases.

== Presidency (2018–2022) ==
=== 2018 general election ===
Džaferović announced his candidacy in the Bosnian general election on 26 May 2018, running for Bosnia's three-person Presidency member, representing the Bosniaks.

In the general election, held on 7 October 2018, he was elected to the Presidency, having obtained 36.61% of the vote. The Social Democratic Party candidate Denis Bećirović, was second with 33.53%.

=== Tenure ===
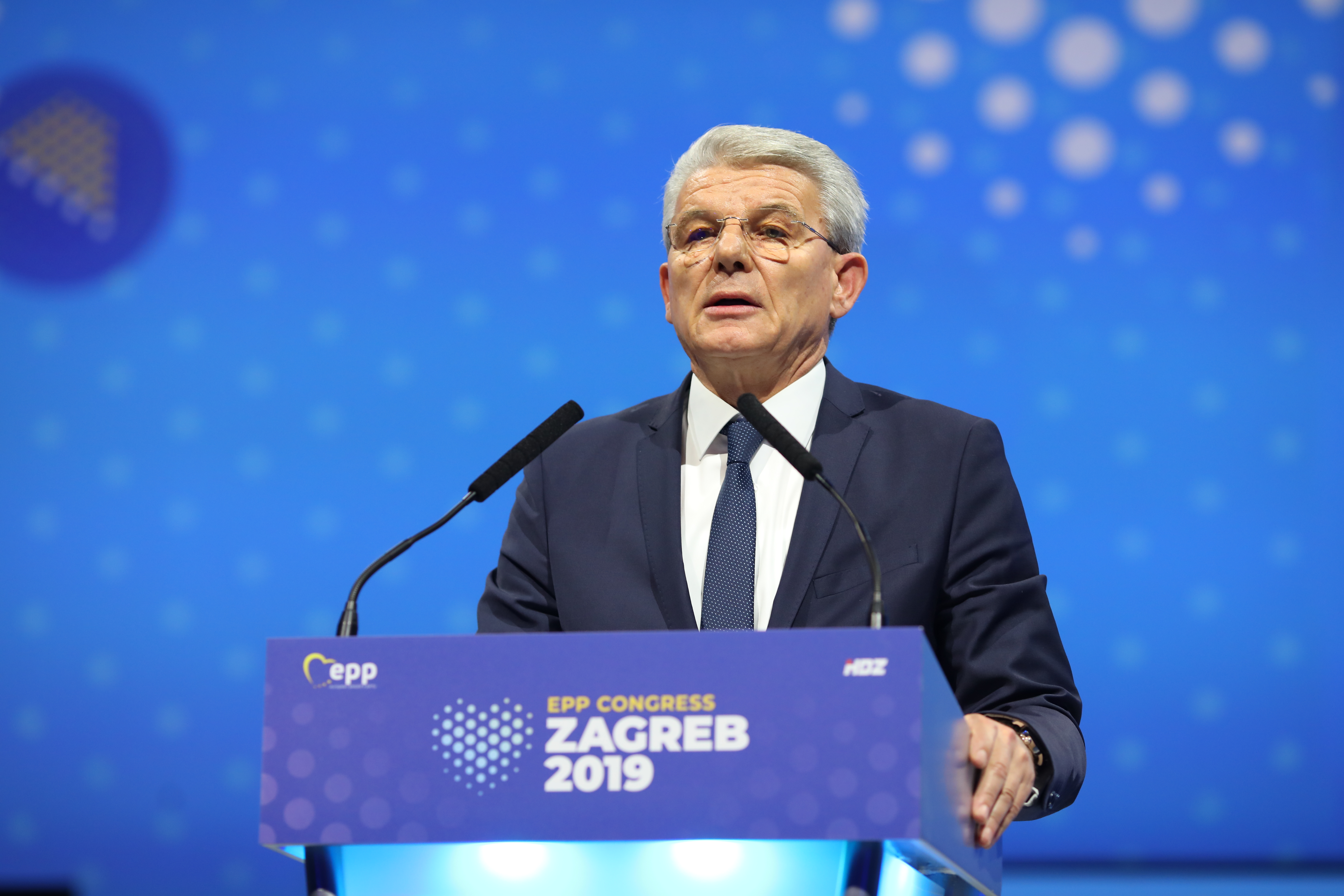
Džaferović speaking at an EPP summit in Zagreb, 20 November 2019

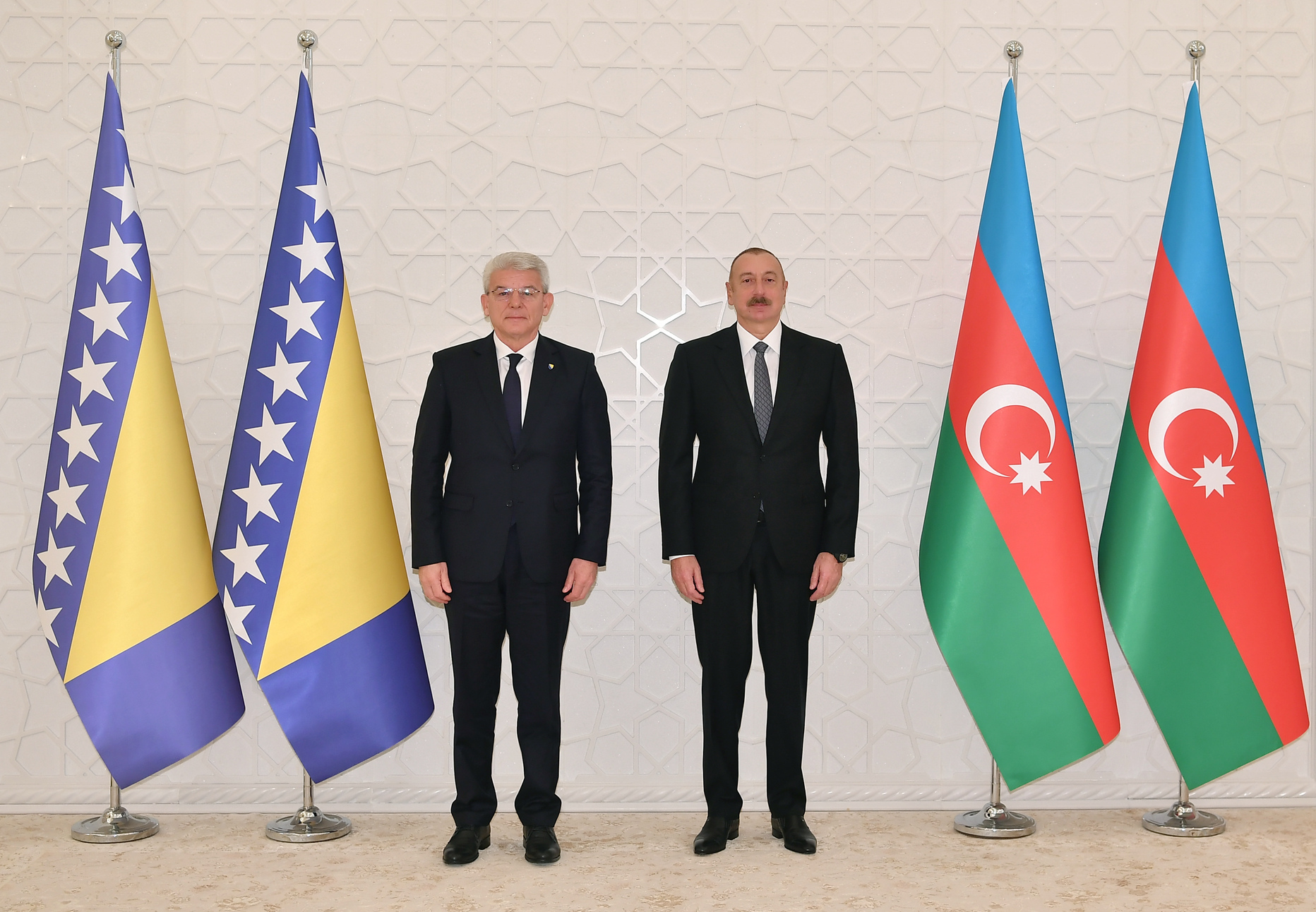
Džaferović alongside Azerbaijani President Ilham Aliyev, 3 November 2021

During the first month of his presidency, quarrels transpired between Džaferović and Serb member Milorad Dodik, with the latter stating he would not attend the first Presidency session under the new leadership until the flag of Republika Srpska, an entity of Bosnia and Herzegovina, was put in his office. Dodik eventually relented, agreeing to hold the session with only the national flag.

In May 2021, disagreements within the Presidency became evident: while Džaferović and fellow Presidency member Željko Komšić attended a joint military exercise with the United States Army, Dodik refused. Later that year, Džaferović and Komšić acted without Dodik's consent to address wildfires in Herzegovina, highlighting institutional gridlock.

Opting not to run for a second term and instead endorsing Bakir Izetbegović, Džaferović was succeeded in office by Denis Bećirović in November 2022, following the October general election and Izetbegović's failure to get elected.

==== COVID-19 pandemic ====
As the COVID-19 pandemic in Bosnia and Herzegovina started in March 2020, the Presidency announced Armed Forces' placement of quarantine tents at the country's borders intended for Bosnian citizens returning home. Every Bosnian citizen arriving to the country was obligated to self-quarantine for 14 days starting from the day of arrival. Tents were set up on the northern border with Croatia.

On 2 March 2021, Serbian president Aleksandar Vučić came to Sarajevo and met with Džaferović and other presidency members, Komšić and Dodik, and donated 10,000 doses of AstraZeneca COVID-19 vaccines for the COVID-19 pandemic. Three days later, on 5 March, Slovenian president Borut Pahor also came to Sarajevo and met with Džaferović, Komšić and Dodik, and stated that Slovenia will also donate 4,800 AstraZeneca COVID-19 vaccines for the pandemic.

On 22 March, in an interview for Federalna televizija, Džaferović stated:

"Bosnia and Herzegovina does not lack behind other Western Balkans countries in the process of immunization of the population against COVID-19, with the exception of Serbia...We have already started this process, albeit with vaccines from donations from several sources, and I thank everyone who helped Bosnia and Herzegovina at a time when we could not get the vaccines."

This statement was met with heavy backlash by opposition parties in the country, with Our Party commenting on Džaferović's statement: "With disinformation, Džaferović is trying to take away responsibility from himself and his party." Nermin Nikšić, president of the Social Democratic Party, replied to Džaferović: "With his statement that our country does not lack behind the region in vaccination, Džaferović showed that he does not differ from his party "boss" Izetbegović [Bakir Izetbegović] or Prime Minister Novalić [Fadil Novalić]." Nikšić ended with saying that "according to official statistics, we are at the bottom of the list in terms of the COVID-19 vaccination rate, behind Rwanda, Cambodia and Zimbabwe." Džaferović's statement also encountered a series of witty and original reactions on social media platforms.

On 16 July 2021, Džaferović received his first dose of the Sinopharm BIBP COVID-19 vaccine. He received his second dose of the BIBP vaccine nearly a month later after his first dose, on 13 August.

==== Foreign policy ====
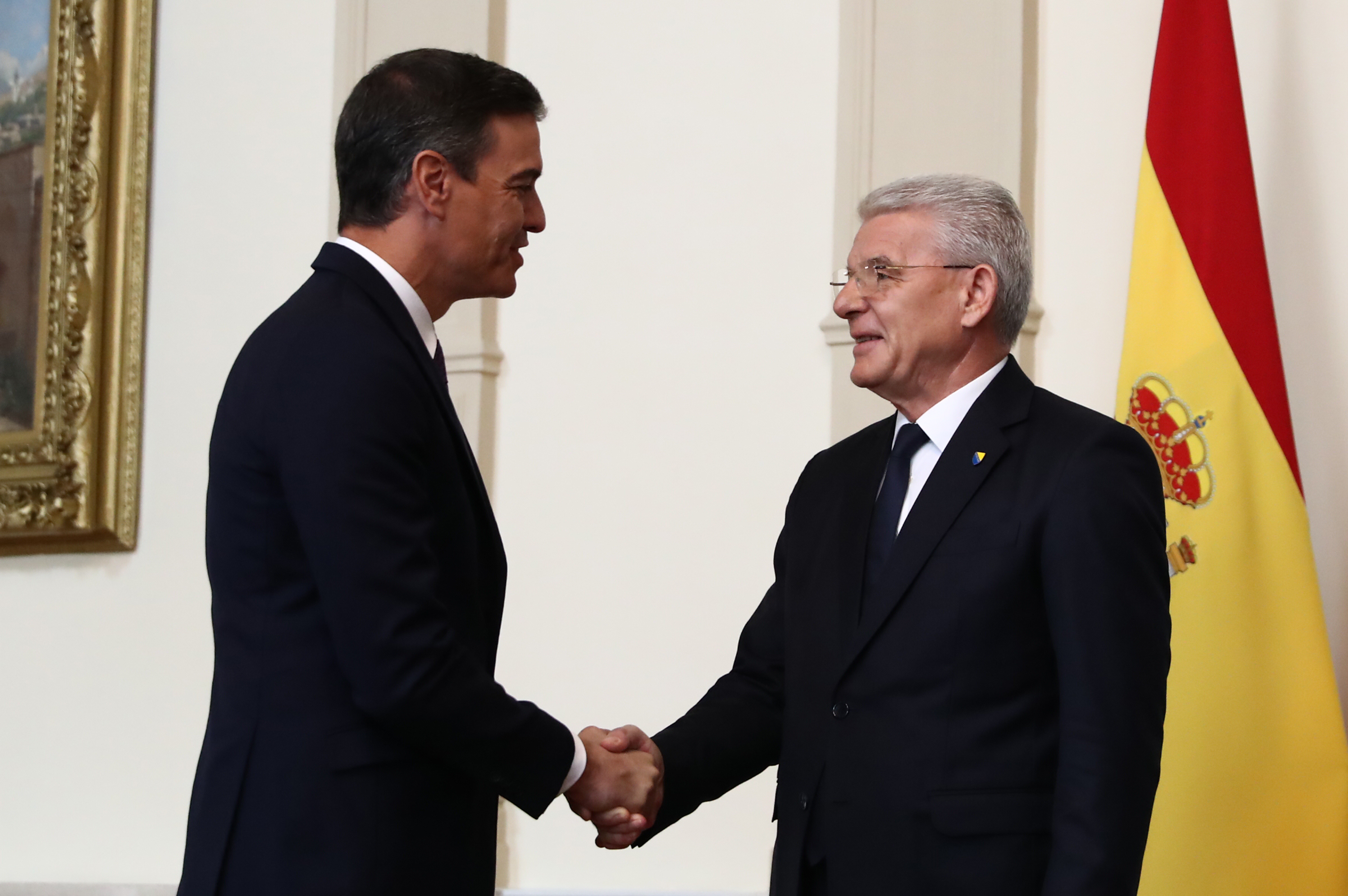
Džaferović greeting Spanish Prime Minister Pedro Sánchez, 30 July 2022

In December 2020, right before a state visit of Russian foreign minister Sergey Lavrov, Džaferović refused to attend the visit because of Lavrov's disrespect to Bosnia and Herzegovina and decision to firstly visit only Bosnian Serb leader Milorad Dodik and later on the Presidency consisting of Željko Komšić, Dodik and Džaferović. Shortly before Džaferović, Komšić also refused to attend Lavrov's visit because of the same reasons as Džaferović.

Following Russia recognizing the Donetsk People's Republic and the Luhansk People's Republic as independent states on 21 February 2022, which are disputed territories in the Ukrainian region of Donbas, Džaferović condemned Russia's moves to recognize the independence of Donetsk and Luhansk:

"Bosnia and Herzegovina respects and supports the territorial integrity and sovereignty of Ukraine. I condemn the decision of the Russian Federation to recognize the two Ukrainian regions as states, which is a flagrant violation of international law."

On 24 February 2022, Russian president Vladimir Putin ordered a large-scale invasion of Ukraine, marking a dramatic escalation of the Russo-Ukrainian War that began in 2014. Regarding the invasion, Džaferović said that "Bosnia and Herzegovina stands with the people who suffered brutal attacks by Russian military forces in cities all over Ukraine. Our prayers and best wishes are with them."

===== Relations with Turkey =====
On 16 March 2021, Džaferović, Komšić and Dodik went on a state visit to Turkey to meet with Turkish President Recep Tayyip Erdoğan. While there, Erdoğan promised to donate Bosnia and Herzegovina 30,000 COVID-19 vaccines for the COVID-19 pandemic. Also on the meeting, Bosnia and Herzegovina and Turkey agreed on mutual recognition and exchange of driving licenses, as well as signing an agreement on cooperation in infrastructure and construction projects, which also refers to the construction of a highway from Bosnia's capital Sarajevo to Serbia's capital Belgrade; the agreement being signed by Minister of Communication and Traffic Vojin Mitrović.

On 21 July 2021, Džaferović spoke in a telephone call with Erdoğan, exchanging Eid al-Adha greetings and also discussing about economic cooperation.

On 27 August 2021, Erdoğan came to Sarajevo on a state visit in Bosnia and Herzegovina and met with all three Presidency members, having talks about more economic and infrastructural cooperation, as well as looking into the construction of the highway from Sarajevo to Belgrade. Also, a trilateral meeting between Turkey, Serbia and Bosnia and Herzegovina was agreed on and should happen in the near future.

===== European Union =====
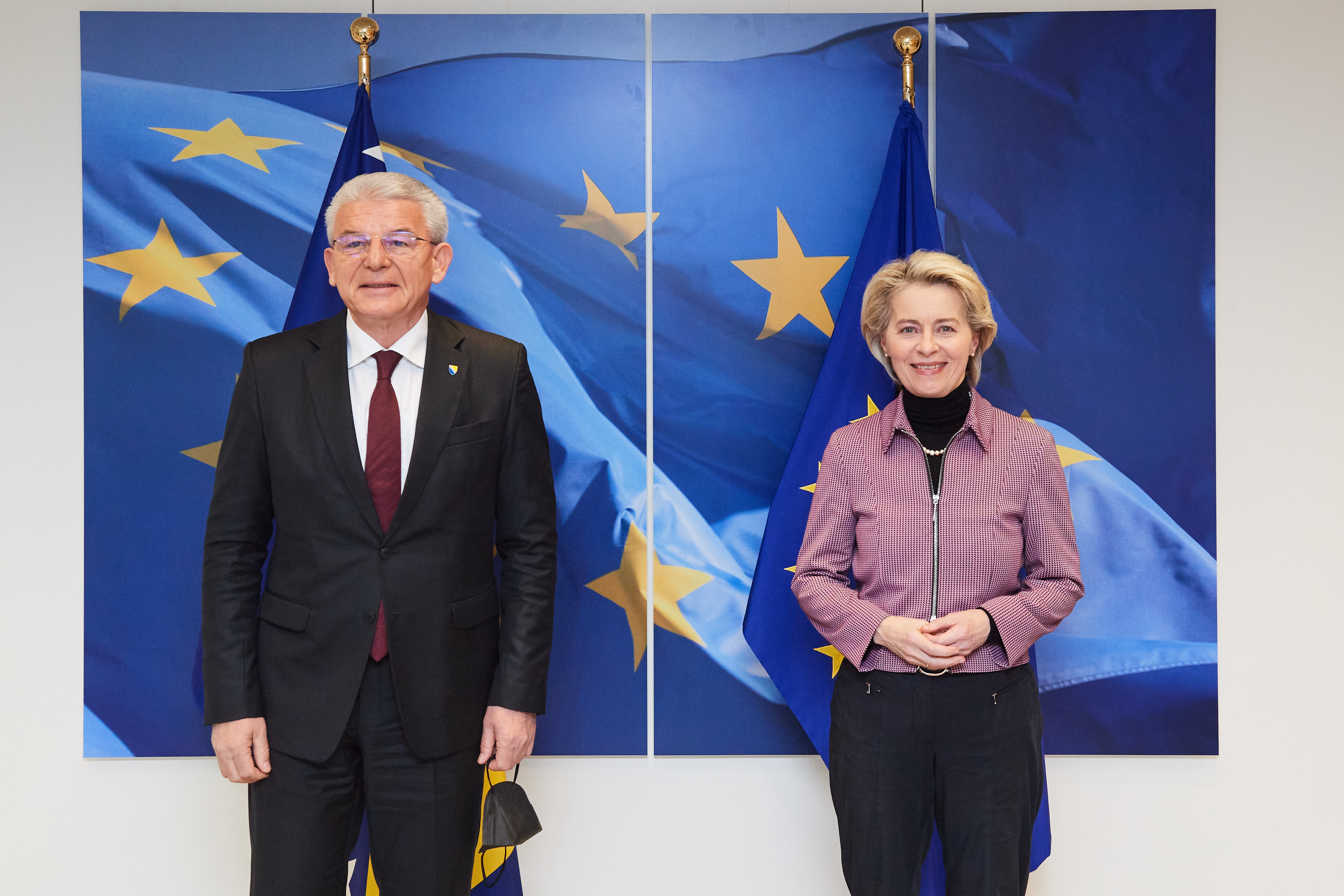
Džaferović with European Commission President Ursula von der Leyen, 30 March 2022

In September 2020, Džaferović and his fellow Presidency members said that an EU candidate status for Bosnia and Herzegovina was possible in the year 2021 if the country "implements successful reforms".

On 30 September 2021, Džaferović, Komšić and Dodik met with European Commission President Ursula von der Leyen at the Presidency Building in Sarajevo. This was part of von der Leyen's visit to Bosnia and Herzegovina, since she some hours before opened the Svilaj border checkpoint and a bridge over the nearby Sava river, which bears the internationally important freeway Pan-European Corridor Vc.

On 1 December 2021, Džaferović and Komšić met with German Minister of State for Europe Michael Roth, with the main topics of discussion being the political situation in Bosnia and Herzegovina, reform processes and activities on the country's EU path. On 20 May 2022, he met with European Council President Charles Michel, during his visit to Sarajevo, with whom he discussed about Bosnia and Herzegovina's accession to the EU.

===== Balkan non-papers =====
In April 2021, Džaferović sent a letter of concern to European Council President Charles Michel upon a supposed non-paper sent by Slovenian Prime Minister Janez Janša, regarding possible border changes in the Western Balkans. After hearing news about the supposed non-paper, Janša spoke in a telephone call with Džaferović, stating that "there is no non-paper regarding border changes in the Western Balkans" and adding that he supports "the territorial integrity of Bosnia and Herzegovina".

The first non-paper's plans and ideas were heavily criticized and reacted to by many political leaders from Bosnia and Herzegovina, Serbia, Croatia, Montenegro, Slovenia, North Macedonia, as well as by politicians from the European Union and Russia. A second non-paper, which first appeared in Kosovo's Albanian-language media in April 2021, proposed that Serbia recognize Kosovo's independence by February 2022 and that Serb-majority North Kosovo be granted autonomy in return for Serbia's recognition.

== Post-presidency (2022–present) ==
Following his presidency, Džaferović was appointed member of the national House of Peoples on 16 February 2023.

== Personal life ==
Džaferović has been married to his wife Vildana since 1980. They have two children, Jasmin and Jasmina. They live in Sarajevo.

== Notes ==
Political offices
Preceded by Bakir Izetbegović	Bosniak member of the Presidency of Bosnia and Herzegovina; 2018–2022	Succeeded by Denis Bećirović
Preceded by Željko Komšić	Chairman of the Presidency of Bosnia and Herzegovina; 2020	Succeeded by Milorad Dodik
Preceded by Željko Komšić	Chairman of the Presidency of Bosnia and Herzegovina; 2022	Succeeded by Željka Cvijanović
