= Živko Radišić =

Bosnian Serb politician (1937–2021)

- Живко Радишић
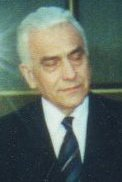

Chairman of the Presidency of Bosnia and Herzegovina
- In office 14 October 2000 – 14 June 2001
- Preceded by: Alija Izetbegović
- Succeeded by: Jozo Križanović
- In office 13 October 1998 – 15 June 1999
- Preceded by: Alija Izetbegović
- Succeeded by: Ante Jelavić

Serb member of the Presidency of Bosnia and Herzegovina
- In office 13 October 1998 – 28 October 2002
- Prime Minister: See list: Spasoje Tuševljak Martin Raguž Božidar Matić Zlatko Lagumdžija Dragan Mikerević
- Preceded by: Momčilo Krajišnik
- Succeeded by: Mirko Šarović
Additional positions
President of the Socialist Party
In office 1996–2002
Preceded by	Dragutin Ilić
Succeeded by	Petar Đokić
Mayor of Banja Luka
In office 1977–1982
Preceded by	Seid Maglajlija
Succeeded by	Marinko Banušić

Personal details
- Born: 15 August 1937 Prijedor, Kingdom of Yugoslavia
- Died: 5 September 2021 (aged 84) Banja Luka, Bosnia and Herzegovina
- Party: Socialist Party
- Spouse: Draginja Radišić
- Education: University of Sarajevo (BA)

Živko Radišić (Serbian Cyrillic: Живко Радишић, pronounced [ʒîːʋko rǎdiʃit͡ɕ]; 15 August 1937 – 5 September 2021) was a Bosnian Serb politician who served as the Serb member of the Presidency of Bosnia and Herzegovina from 1998 to 2002. He previously served as mayor of Banja Luka from 1977 to 1982. Radišić was a founding member and president of the Socialist Party from 1996 to 2002.

== Career ==
Born in Prijedor, Kingdom of Yugoslavia, present-day Bosnia and Herzegovina, on 15 August 1937, Radišić graduated in 1964 from the University of Sarajevo Faculty of Political Science. During the 1969 Banja Luka earthquake, he was a high ranking Banja Luka city government official, and thus, was directly in charge of repairing the consequences from the earthquake.

Later on, from 1977 until 1982, Radišić served as mayor of Banja Luka. From 1982 to 1985, he headed the defence ministry of SR Bosnia and Herzegovina. In 1993, Radišić became a founding member of the Socialist Party. In 1996, alongside Milorad Dodik, he formed the People's Alliance for Free Peace for the 1996 general election.

Radišić was elected Serb member of the Bosnian Presidency in the 1998 general election, defeating the incumbent Momčilo Krajišnik by 45,000 votes. He chaired the Presidency from 1998 until 1999 and again from 2000 until 2001. Radišić decided not to run for a second term in the Presidency in the 2002 general election. His term ended on 28 October 2002, and was succeeded as the Serb member by Mirko Šarović.

== Personal life ==
Živko was married to Draginja Radišić and spent most of their life living in Banja Luka.

He died on 5 September 2021, aged 84, in a Banja Luka hospital.
