= Halid Genjac =

Bosnian politician (born 1958)

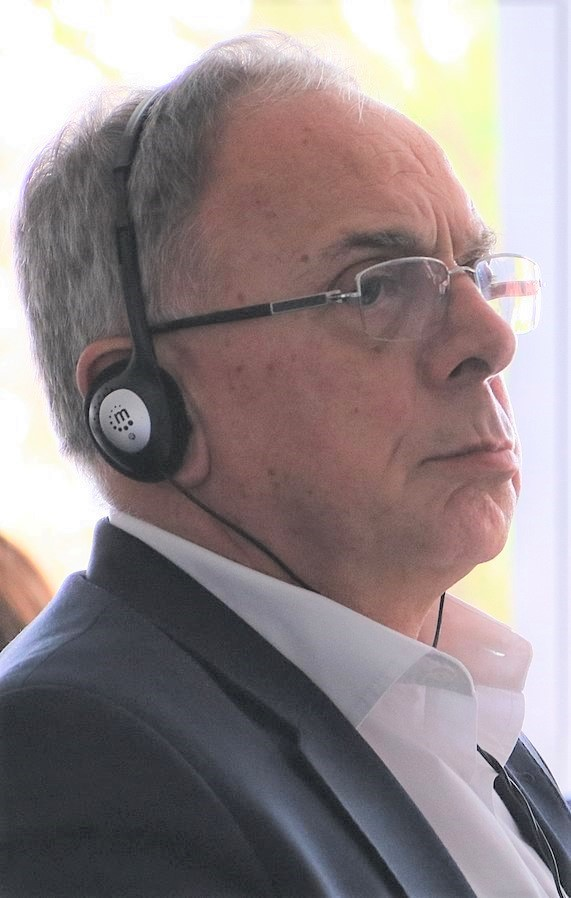
- Genjac in 2017

Bosniak member of the Presidency of Bosnia and Herzegovina
- In office 14 October 2000 – 30 March 2001
- Prime Minister: Spasoje Tuševljak; Martin Raguž; Božidar Matić
- Preceded by: Alija Izetbegović
- Succeeded by: Beriz Belkić

General Secretary of the Party of Democratic Action
- Incumbent
- Assumed office 24 March 2018
- Preceded by: Amir Zukić
Parliamentary offices
Member of the House of Representatives
In office 6 December 2018 – 1 December 2022
Constituency	4th Electoral Unit
In office 20 November 2006 – 30 November 2010
Constituency	4th Electoral Unit
In office 3 January 1997 – 14 October 2000
Member of the House of Peoples
In office 9 June 2011 – 28 February 2019
In office 30 March 2001 – 14 March 2007

Personal details
- Born: 8 March 1958 (age 68) Visoko, PR Bosnia and Herzegovina, FPR Yugoslavia
- Party: Party of Democratic Action (1990–present)
- Spouse: Sadika Genjac
- Children: 3
- Education: University of Tuzla (MB)

Halid Genjac (born 8 March 1958) is a Bosnian politician and former physician who served as the Bosniak member of the Presidency of Bosnia and Herzegovina from 2000 to 2001. He is the current general secretary of the Party of Democratic Action (SDA).

Genjac has been a member of the SDA since its foundation in 1990. He was also a long time member of both the national House of Peoples and House of Representatives. He is seen as a close ally of current SDA president Bakir Izetbegović.

== Early life and education ==
Born in Visoko, PR Bosnia and Herzegovina, FPR Yugoslavia on 8 March 1958, Genjac finished primary school in Lower Moštre and high school in 1975 in Visoko. He graduated from the Faculty of Medicine in Tuzla in 1981.

== Early career ==
After graduating, Genjac was employed at a health center in Travnik, and in 1990 he specialized in gynaecologic cytology in Zagreb. The same year, Genjac returned to the Travnik health center, where he became the head of the Women's Health Protection Service, and in 1992, the director of the health center. He worked as director until 1995, after which he began his political career

== Political career ==
Genjac has been a member of the Party of Democratic Action (SDA) since its foundation in 1990. He was first the president of the party's main board, but then on 24 March 2018, he was elected general secretary of the SDA, succeeding Amir Zukić.

In the first post-war election in 1996, Genjac was elected to the House of Representatives of the Parliamentary Assembly of Bosnia and Herzegovina, and until 2000, he was also a member of its leadership.

In the 2000 parliamentary election, he was again a candidate for the House of Representatives, but did not win enough votes, so Genjac was appointed as a member of the national House of Peoples. The same year however, Alija Izetbegović, the first Chairman of the Presidency of Bosnia and Herzegovina, withdrew from the Bosnian Presidency, and so Genjac took his place, serving in office until 30 March 2001.

In the 2002 general election, Genjac failed to win a seat in the national House of Representatives, but he was re-appointed as a member in the House of Peoples. In the 2006 general election, Genjac was once again elected to the House of Representatives, but four years later though, in the 2010 general election he did not succeed, so he was appointed member of the House of Peoples for a third time. After the 2014 general election, he remained as member of the House of Peoples. Genjac was elected to the national House of Representatives in the 2018 general election.

== Personal life ==
Halid is married to Sadika Genjac and together they have three children. They live in Sarajevo.

Political offices
Preceded by Alija Izetbegović	Bosniak member of the Presidency of Bosnia and Herzegovina; 2000–2001	Succeeded by Beriz Belkić
