= Jozo Križanović =

Bosnian politician (1944–2009)

Chairman of the Presidency of Bosnia and Herzegovina
- In office 14 June 2001 – 14 February 2002
- Preceded by: Živko Radišić
- Succeeded by: Beriz Belkić

Croat member of the Presidency of Bosnia and Herzegovina
- In office 7 March 2001 – 28 October 2002
- Preceded by: Ante Jelavić
- Succeeded by: Dragan Čović

Member of the House of Representatives
- In office 28 October 2002 – 2 December 2009
- Constituency: 4th Electoral Unit

Personal details
- Born: 28 July 1944 Vitez, Independent State of Croatia (modern-day Bosnia and Herzegovina)
- Died: 2 December 2009 (aged 65) Zagreb, Croatia
- Party: Social Democratic Party
- Education: University of Sarajevo (BS, MS)

Jozo Križanović (28 July 1944 – 2 December 2009) was a Bosnian politician who served as the Croat member of the Presidency of Bosnia and Herzegovina from 2001 to 2002. A member of the Social Democratic Party (SDP BiH), he later served in the national House of Representatives from 2002 to 2009.

Born in Vitez during World War II, Križanović earned a degree in mechanical engineer at the University of Sarajevo and spent much of his early career in local industry and municipal administration in central Bosnia. Entering politics through the SDP BiH during the late 1990s, he became a member of the Presidency in March 2001, following the removal of Ante Jelavić by the High Representative for Bosnia and Herzegovina. As Presidency member, Križanović supported Bosnia and Herzegovina's cooperation with international institutions, post-war reconciliation, and engagement with the ICTY and other Euro-Atlantic partners.

Following his term in the Presidency, Križanović served two terms as member of the House of Representatives, where he led the SDP BiH parliamentary club and took part in legislative committees focused on governance and institutional reform. He served in the House of Representatives until his death in 2009.

== Early life and education ==
Križanović was born on 28 July 1944 in Vitez, then part of the Independent State of Croatia, a Nazi German puppet state during World War II. He finished gymnasium in Travnik in 1963 and graduated from the Faculty of Mechanical Engineering at the University of Sarajevo in 1969. He later obtained a master's degree in organizational sciences from the University of Sarajevo in 1982.

In the late socialist period and the early transition to a market system, Križanović worked in local industry and local government in the Travnik area. He held management positions in the enterprise Bratstvo and served in municipal leadership roles in Pucarevo, modern-day Novi Travnik.

== Political career ==
Križanović became active in the Social Democratic Party (SDP BiH) and held party posts at regional level before moving to state-level politics.

=== Presidency (2001–2002) ===
In March 2001, Križanović replaced Croatian Democratic Union (HDZ BiH) leader Ante Jelavić as the Croat member of the Presidency of Bosnia and Herzegovina. Jelavić had been removed from office by the decision of Wolfgang Petritsch, the High Representative for Bosnia and Herzegovina. Križanović's appointment reflected the extraordinary constitutional and political circumstances of the early 2000s in Bosnia and Herzegovina, when the Office of the High Representative exercised executive powers to remove officials judged to have violated the Dayton Peace Agreement. Petritsch justified his decision by observing that Jelavić had "directly violated the constitutional order of the Federation of Bosnia and Herzegovina and of Bosnia and Herzegovina"; in particular he cited Jelavić's leading role in the 'Croatian National Assembly' rally in Mostar on 3 March 2001, calling for a separate governing entity for Bosnian Croats.

Križanović served as chairman of the Presidency from June 2001 until February 2002. During his tenure, Križanović publicly supported Bosnia and Herzegovina's cooperation with international institutions, including cooperation with the International Criminal Tribunal for the former Yugoslavia (ICTY), and participated in inter-ethnic and state-building negotiations characteristic of the post-war period.

Choosing not to seek re-election in the 2002 general election, Križanović's term ended in October 2002. He was succeeded as the Croat member of the Presidency by HDZ BiH member Dragan Čović.

=== Post-presidency (2002–2009) ===
Križanović was elected to the national House of Representatives in the 2002 general election. He served as head of the SDP BiH parliamentary club in the House of Representatives and was part of a number of parliamentary committees. He was re-elected in the 2006 general election and remained an MP until his death in 2009.

== Death ==
Križanović died from complications following surgery in Zagreb, Croatia on 2 December 2009. Subsequently, a memorial session honoring him was held at the Parliamentary Assembly. Križanović was buried in Vitez on 5 December, three days after his death.
