= Presidency of Bosnia and Herzegovina =

Collective head of state

- Predsjedništvo Bosne i Hercegovine (Bosnian); Предсједништво Босне и Херцеговине (Serbian)
- Coat of arms of Bosnia and Herzegovina

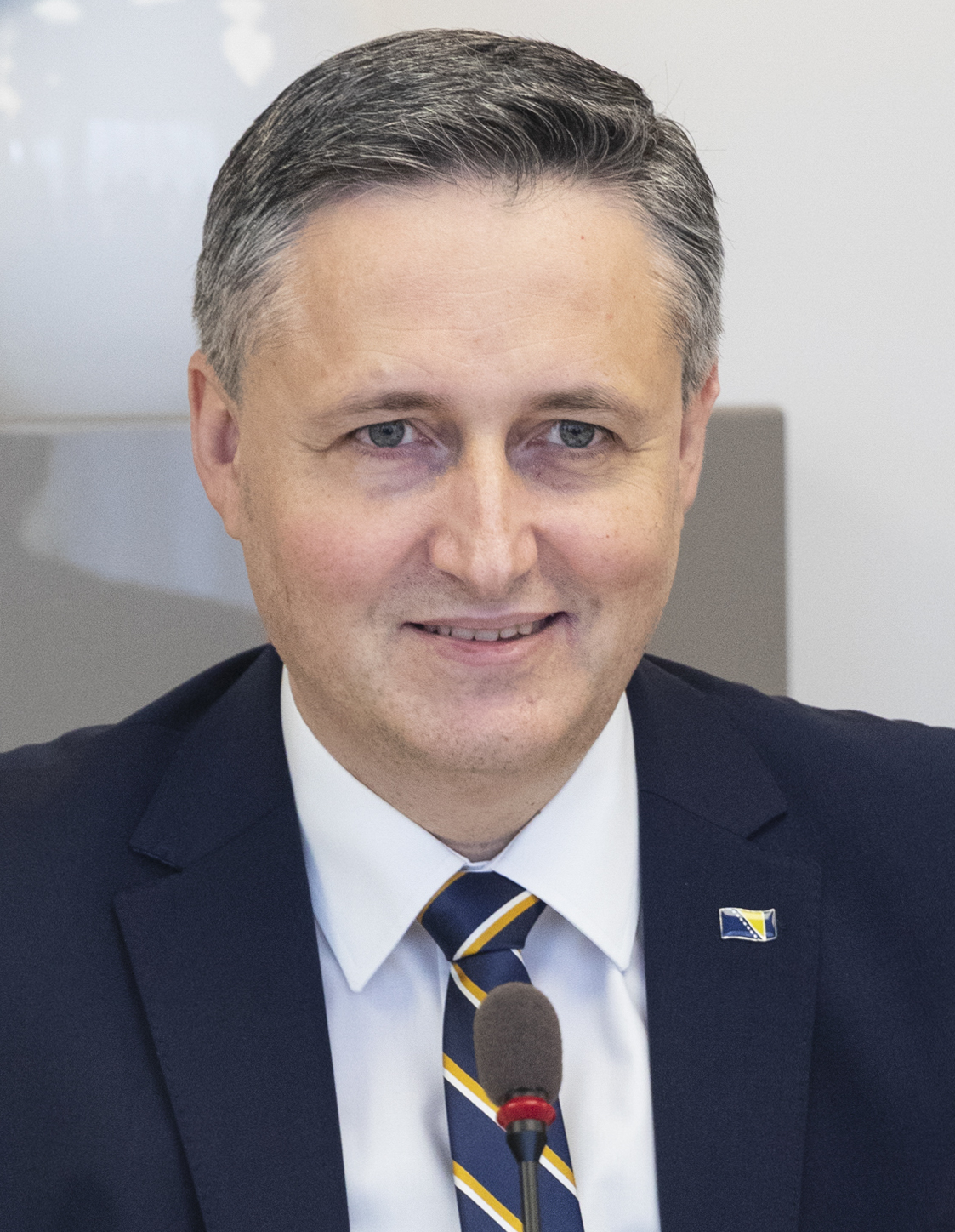
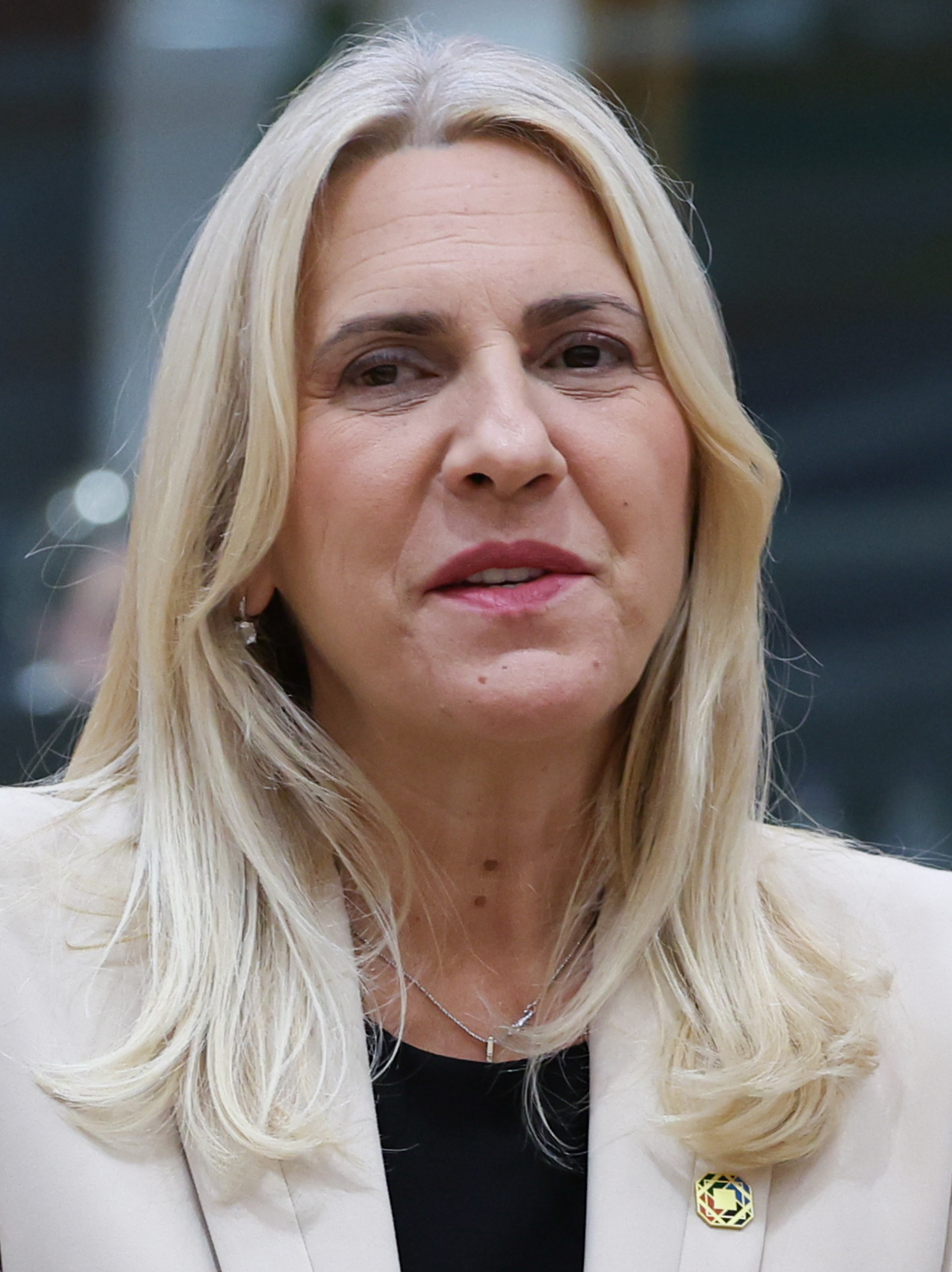
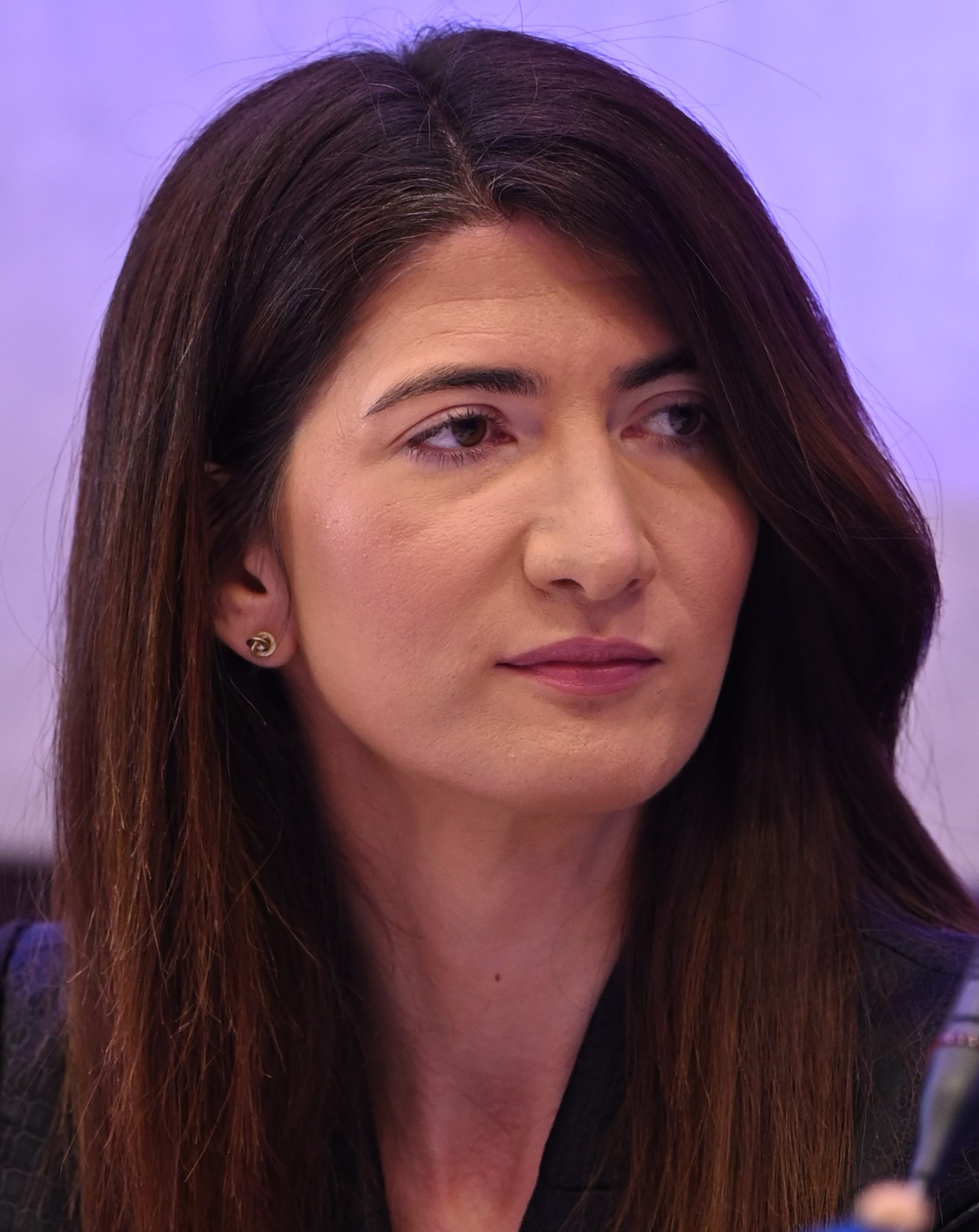
- Incumbent; Denis Bećirović; Željka Cvijanović; Darijana Filipović since 16 November 2026
- Status: Head of state
- Seat: Presidency Building, Marshal Tito street 16, Sarajevo
- Appointer: Direct election
- Term length: Four years; renewable once consecutively
- Constituting instrument: Constitution of Bosnia and Herzegovina (1995)
- Formation: 13 October 1996; 30 years ago
- First holder: Alija Izetbegović; Momčilo Krajišnik; Krešimir Zubak
- Salary: KM 6,045 / €3,091 per month
- Website: www.predsjednistvobih.ba

The Presidency of Bosnia and Herzegovina (Bosnian: Predsjedništvo Bosne i Hercegovine) is a three-member body that collectively serves as the head of state of Bosnia and Herzegovina. Under Article V of the Constitution of Bosnia and Herzegovina, defined by the Dayton Agreement in 1995, it consists of one Bosniak and one Croat member directly elected from the Federation of Bosnia and Herzegovina, and one Serb member directly elected from Republika Srpska.

Members of the presidency serve a four-year term and may hold office for a maximum of two consecutive terms, although there is no overall lifetime limit.

While the presidency acts collectively as the head of state, one member serves as chairperson at a time. The chairmanship rotates among the three members every eight months, beginning with the member who received the highest number of votes in the election.

== Current members ==
Since the 2026 general election, the members of the Presidency are:

Member	Portrait	Took office	Party	Representing	Chair terms (Note: Current 2026–2030 term only)
Denis Bećirović		16 November 2022 (2nd term)	SDP BiH	Bosniaks	
Željka Cvijanović		16 November 2022 (2nd term)	SNSD	Serbs	16 November 2026 – present
Darijana Filipović		16 November 2026 (1st term)	HDZ BiH	Croats	

== Powers and duties ==
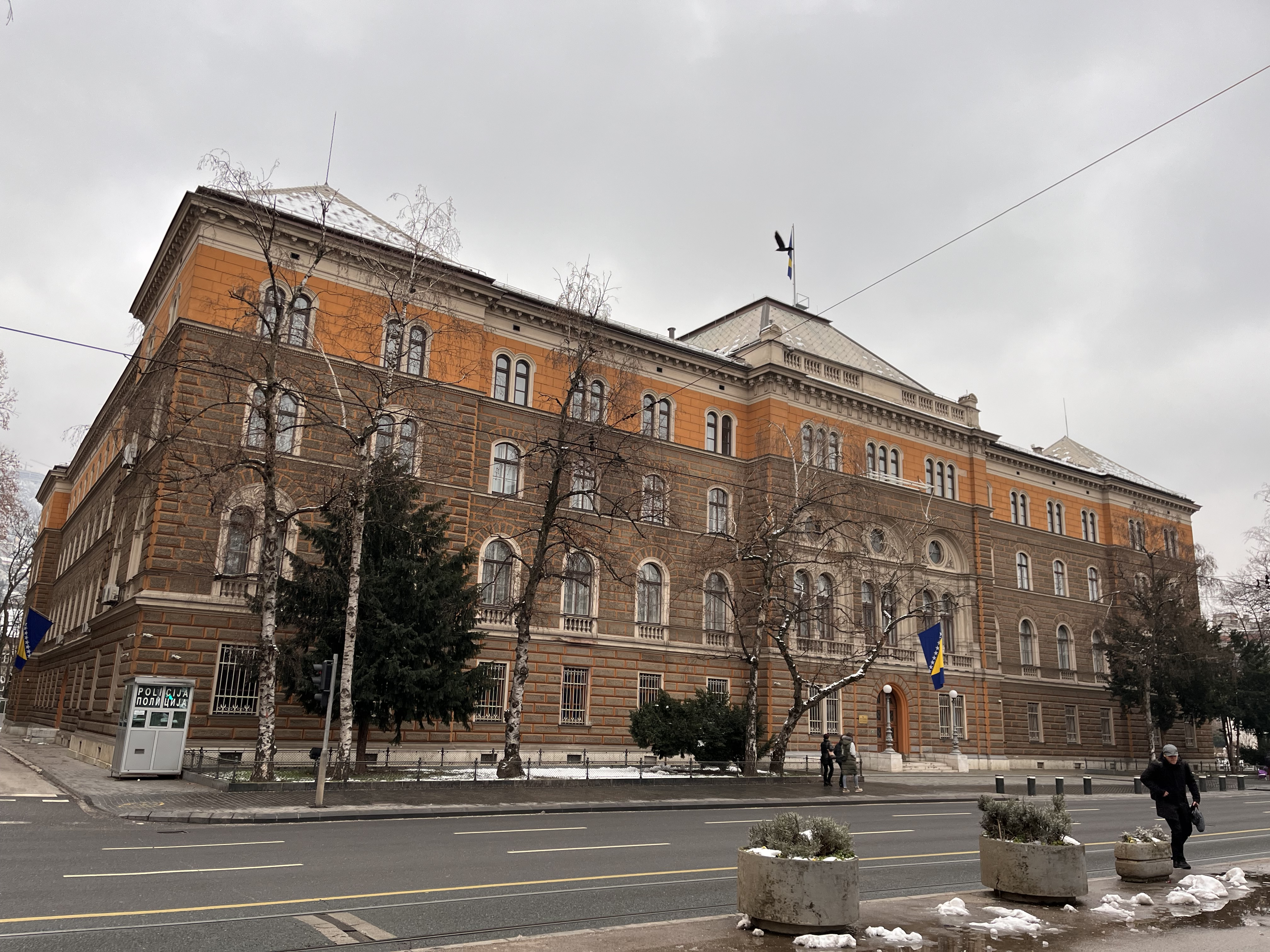
The Presidency Building in central Sarajevo

The Presidency is responsible for conducting the foreign policy of Bosnia and Herzegovina and representing the country in international relations. Its powers include appointing ambassadors and other international representatives, representing the state in European and international organizations, and seeking membership in organizations of which the country is not a member. The presidency also negotiates, denounces, and, subject to the consent of the Parliamentary Assembly of Bosnia and Herzegovina, ratifies international treaties.

The presidency executes decisions of the Parliamentary Assembly and proposes the annual state budget to the assembly upon the recommendation of the Council of Ministers of Bosnia and Herzegovina. It is also required to report to the Parliamentary Assembly, at least annually, on its expenditures and may coordinate with international and non-governmental organizations operating in the country. In addition, the presidency performs other duties assigned by the Parliamentary Assembly or agreed upon by the country’s entities.

The presidency nominates the Chair of the Council of Ministers, who assumes office after approval by the House of Representatives of Bosnia and Herzegovina. Each member of the presidency also exercises civilian command authority over the Armed Forces of Bosnia and Herzegovina by virtue of their office.

== List of members ==
Term	Election	Members	Party	Ethnicity
1 (13 October 1996 – 12 October 1998)	1996	Alija Izetbegović	SDA	Bosniak
1 (13 October 1996 – 12 October 1998)	1996	Momčilo Krajišnik	SDS	Serb
1 (13 October 1996 – 12 October 1998)	1996	Krešimir Zubak	HDZ BiH	Croat
2 (13 October 1998 – 28 October 2002)	1998	Alija Izetbegović (until October 2000)	SDA	Bosniak
2 (13 October 1998 – 28 October 2002)	1998	Halid Genjac (October 2000 – March 2001)	SDA	Bosniak
2 (13 October 1998 – 28 October 2002)	1998	Beriz Belkić (from March 2001)	SBiH	Bosniak
2 (13 October 1998 – 28 October 2002)	1998	Živko Radišić	SP	Serb
2 (13 October 1998 – 28 October 2002)	1998	Ante Jelavić (until March 2001)	HDZ BiH	Croat
2 (13 October 1998 – 28 October 2002)	1998	Jozo Križanović (from March 2001)	SDP BiH	Croat
3 (28 October 2002 – 6 November 2006)	2002	Sulejman Tihić	SDA	Bosniak
3 (28 October 2002 – 6 November 2006)	2002	Mirko Šarović (until April 2003)	SDS	Serb
3 (28 October 2002 – 6 November 2006)	2002	Borislav Paravac (from April 2003)	SDS	Serb
3 (28 October 2002 – 6 November 2006)	2002	Dragan Čović (until May 2005)	HDZ BiH	Croat
3 (28 October 2002 – 6 November 2006)	2002	Ivo Miro Jović (from May 2005)	HDZ BiH	Croat
4 (6 November 2006 – 10 November 2010)	2006	Haris Silajdžić	SBiH	Bosniak
4 (6 November 2006 – 10 November 2010)	2006	Nebojša Radmanović	SNSD	Serb
4 (6 November 2006 – 10 November 2010)	2006	Željko Komšić	SDP BiH	Croat
5 (10 November 2010 – 17 November 2014)	2010	Bakir Izetbegović	SDA	Bosniak
5 (10 November 2010 – 17 November 2014)	2010	Nebojša Radmanović	SNSD	Serb
5 (10 November 2010 – 17 November 2014)	2010	Željko Komšić	SDP BiH (until 2012)	Croat
5 (10 November 2010 – 17 November 2014)	2010	Željko Komšić	DF (from 2013)	Croat
6 (17 November 2014 – 20 November 2018)	2014	Bakir Izetbegović	SDA	Bosniak
6 (17 November 2014 – 20 November 2018)	2014	Mladen Ivanić	PDP	Serb
6 (17 November 2014 – 20 November 2018)	2014	Dragan Čović	HDZ BiH	Croat
7 (20 November 2018 – 16 November 2022)	2018	Šefik Džaferović	SDA	Bosniak
7 (20 November 2018 – 16 November 2022)	2018	Milorad Dodik	SNSD	Serb
7 (20 November 2018 – 16 November 2022)	2018	Željko Komšić	DF	Croat
8 (16 November 2022 – 16 November 2026)	2022	Denis Bećirović	SDP BiH	Bosniak
8 (16 November 2022 – 16 November 2026)	2022	Željka Cvijanović	SNSD	Serb
8 (16 November 2022 – 16 November 2026)	2022	Željko Komšić	DF	Croat
9 (16 November 2026 – present)	2026	Denis Bećirović	SDP BiH	Bosniak
9 (16 November 2026 – present)	2026	Željka Cvijanović	SNSD	Serb
9 (16 November 2026 – present)	2026	Darijana Filipović	HDZ BiH	Croat

== See also ==
- Chairman of the Presidency of Bosnia and Herzegovina
  - List of members of the Presidency of Bosnia and Herzegovina
  - List of members of the Presidency by time in office
- Triumvirate
