= Wolfgang Petritsch =

Austrian diplomat (born 1947)

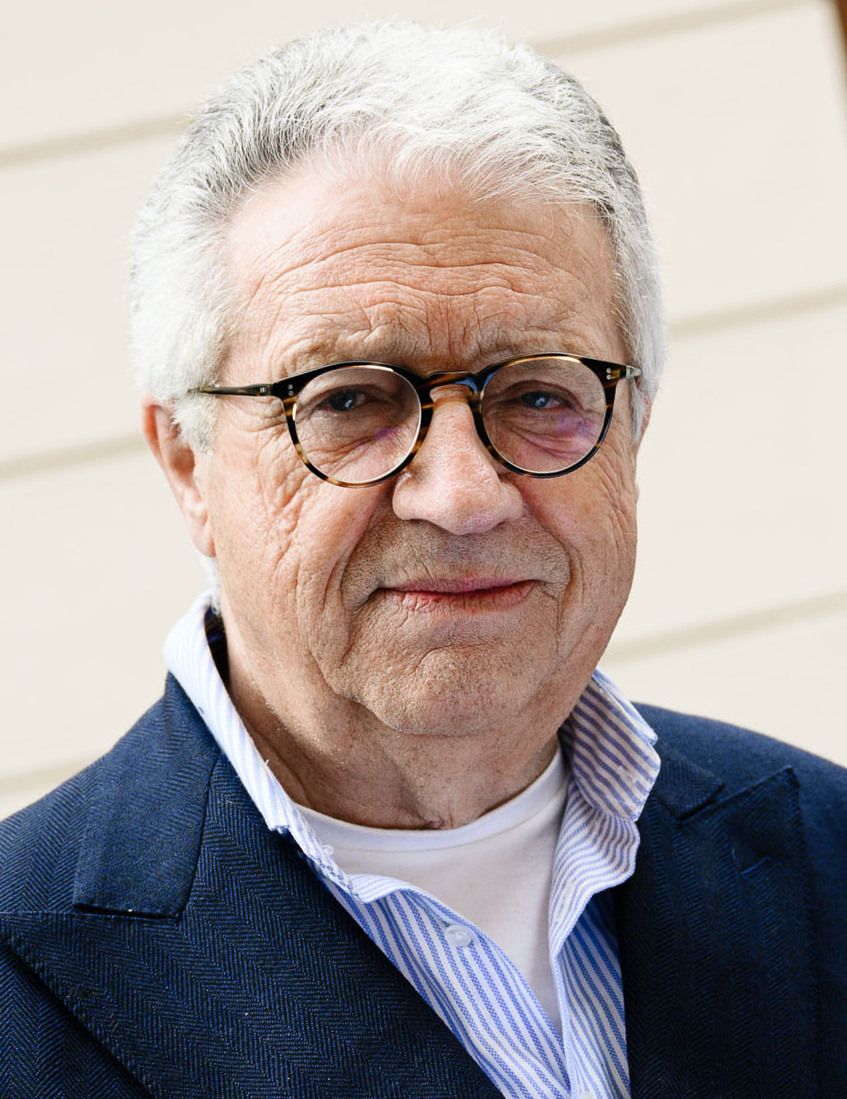
- Petritsch in 2023

High Representative for Bosnia and Herzegovina
- In office 18 August 1999 – 27 May 2002
- Preceded by: Carlos Westendorp
- Succeeded by: Paddy Ashdown

Personal details
- Born: 26 August 1947 (age 79) Klagenfurt, Austria
- Citizenship: Austrian
- Party: Social Democratic Party
- Education: University of Vienna

Wolfgang Petritsch (born 26 August 1947) is an Austrian diplomat who served as the High Representative for Bosnia and Herzegovina from 1999 to 2002.

== Early life and studies ==
Petritsch was born to a Carinthian Slovene family in Klagenfurt; he grew up in Glainach in a mixed Slovene/German-speaking environment. Besides his native tongues, he speaks English, French, and Serbo-Croatian.

Petritsch studied history, German studies, political science and law at the University of Vienna, where he obtained a PhD in 1972. He was also a Fulbright Scholar at the University of Southern California in Los Angeles. From 1977 to 1983 he was secretary and press officer to Federal Chancellor Bruno Kreisky, about whom he published a biography in 2011.

== Diplomatic career ==
After one year at the Austrian Mission to the OECD in Paris, between 1984 and 1992 Petritsch served as Director of the Austrian Press and Information Service Agency in the United States and as Minister Plenipotentiary to Austria's Permanent Mission to the United Nations in New York. In 1992–1994 he served as Acting Head of the Department for Multilateral Economic Co-operation in the Austrian foreign ministry, as well as in the latter year as Head of Department for Information on European Affairs in the Federal Chancellery, supervising the Austrian Federal Government's information campaign on Austria's accession to the EU. Between 1995 and 1997 he headed the Department for International Relations of the City of Vienna.

From 1997 to 1999 he was Austrian Ambassador to the Federal Republic of Yugoslavia. During the same period, between October 1998 and July 1999, he also served as the European Union Special Representative for Kosovo. In such a vest he chaired the EU negotiating teams in February and March 1999 at the Kosovo peace talks in Rambouillet and Paris.

Petritsch served between August 1999 and May 2002 as the international High Representative for Bosnia and Herzegovina (OHR). In this role, he was the final authority on the civilian implementation of the 1995 Dayton Peace Agreement. In 1999–2001 he was also chair of the Succession Commission for the former Socialist Federal Republic of Yugoslavia (SFRY) in charge of distributing the public assets and liabilities among the successor states (Vienna Agreement, June 2001).

In the 2002 Austrian elections, Petritsch ran with Alfred Gusenbauer's SPÖ, as prospective Foreign Minister. Already before the ballot, he was appointed Austria's Permanent Representative to the United Nations in Geneva, on which post he later returned at the beginning of 2008.

In September 2003, Petritsch, as Austria's Permanent Representative to the United Nations Office at Geneva, to the WTO and to the Conference on Disarmament; he was appointed President of the Ottawa Treaty's First Review Conference, or Nairobi Summit on a Mine Free World taking place in Kenya in 2004. In 2004–2005 he chaired the United Nations Economic Commission for Europe (UNECE) and was in charge of its reform.

After leaving Geneva, Petritsch went to Paris as Ambassador and Permanent Representative of Austria to the OECD until 2013.

Since November 2021 Petritsch is part of the advisory board of the Austrian Service Abroad.

== Other positions ==
From 2005 to 2014 Petritsch chaired the Center for European Integration Studies (CEIS) in Geneva. Since 2007 he is President of the Paul Lazarsfeld Gesellschaft, Vienna From 2008 to 2013 he served as chair of the board of the European Cultural Foundation in Amsterdam. Since 2009 he is President of the Herbert Kelman Institute, Vienna. From 2010 to 2013 he was member of the senior advisory group on the International Dialogue on Peacebuilding and Statebuilding (g7+), in Paris. Later he was appointed Joseph A. Schumpeter Fellow at Harvard University. He still serves as the president of the Austrian Marshall Plan Foundation.

== Works ==
- 1999: Kosovo: Mythen, Daten, Fakten = Kosova, gemeinsam mit Karl Kaser und Robert Pichler, Wieser-Verlag, Klagenfurt 1999, ISBN 978-3-85129-304-3
- 2008: Das Kreisky-Prinzip: im Mittelpunkt der Mensch, gemeinsam mit Margaretha Kopeinig, Czernin-Verlag, Wien 2008, ISBN 978-3-7076-0277-7
- 2009: Zielpunkt Europa: von den Schluchten des Balkan und den Mühen der Ebene; Aufsätze – Reden – Kommentare – Interviews – Dokumente, 2001–2009, Wieser-Verlag, Klagenfurt 2009, ISBN 978-3-85129-859-8
- 2010: Die europäische Chance: Neustart nach der Krise, gemeinsam mit Margaretha Kopeinig, Verlag Kremayr & Scheriau, Wien 2010, ISBN 978-3-218-00807-5
- 2010: Bruno Kreisky: die Biografie, Residenz-Verlag, St. Pölten/Salzburg 2010, ISBN 978-3-7017-3189-3
- 2018: Epochenwechsel: unser digital-autoritäres Jahrhundert, Christian Brandstätter Verlag, Wien 2018, ISBN 978-3-7106-0268-9

Diplomatic posts
Preceded by Carlos Westendorp	High Representative for Bosnia and Herzegovina; 1999–2002	Succeeded by The Lord Ashdown of Norton-sub-Hamdon
