= Beriz Belkić =

Bosnian politician (1946–2023)

Chairman of the Presidency of Bosnia and Herzegovina
- In office 14 February 2002 – 28 October 2002
- Preceded by: Jozo Križanović
- Succeeded by: Mirko Šarović

Bosniak member of the Presidency of Bosnia and Herzegovina
- In office 30 March 2001 – 28 October 2002
- Preceded by: Halid Genjac
- Succeeded by: Sulejman Tihić

Prime Minister of Sarajevo Canton
- In office 12 November 1998 – 15 February 2001
- Preceded by: Mustafa Mujezinović
- Succeeded by: Huso Hadžidedić
Parliamentary offices
Member of the House of Representatives
In office 20 November 2006 – 9 December 2014
Constituency	3rd Electoral Unit
In office 29 December 2000 – 30 March 2001
Constituency	3rd Electoral Unit

Personal details
- Born: 8 September 1946 Sarajevo, PR Bosnia and Herzegovina, FPR Yugoslavia
- Died: 16 August 2023 (aged 76) Sarajevo, Bosnia and Herzegovina
- Party: Party for Bosnia and Herzegovina (1996–2023)
- Spouse: Azra Belkić
- Education: University of Sarajevo (BEc)

Beriz Belkić (8 September 1946 – 16 August 2023) was a Bosnian politician who served as the Bosniak member of the Presidency of Bosnia and Herzegovina from 2001 to 2002. He also served as Prime Minister of Sarajevo Canton from 1998 to 2001.

Belkić was a founding member of the Party for Bosnia and Herzegovina. He was elected three times to the national House of Representatives as well.

== Early life and career ==
Born in Sarajevo on 8 September 1946, Belkić graduated from the University of Sarajevo Faculty of Economics. He served on various administrative positions, on municipal, cantonal and state level. His first serious political position was that of Prime Minister of Sarajevo Canton, serving from 12 November 1998 until 15 February 2001.

Following the 2000 parliamentary election, Belkić was elected as a parliament member in the national House of Representatives. On 30 March 2001, he was elected by parliament to replace Halid Genjac as a substitute member of the Presidency of Bosnia and Herzegovina, following the withdrawal of Alija Izetbegović. He was elected back to the House of Representatives in the 2006 general election, serving in parliament until 9 December 2014.

Belkić was a founding member of the Party for Bosnia and Herzegovina in 1996.

== Personal life and death ==
Beriz was married to Azra Belkić. They lived in Sarajevo.

Belkić died in Sarajevo on 16 August 2023, at the age of 76. He reportedly suffered a stroke some days prior to his death.
