= Fahrudin Pecikoza =

Bosnian songwriter (born 1962)

- Born: 11 February 1962 (age 64); Sarajevo, SR Bosnia and Herzegovina, SFR Yugoslavia

Fahrudin Pecikoza (born 11 February 1962) is a Bosnian songwriter. He has written lyrics for Bosnian, Croatian and Serbian singers.

== Songwriting ==
Elvira Rahić

- Sada znam (1995)
  - "A sada idem"
  - "Poljubit ćeš vrata"
  - "Ja za tebe plesala sam"
  - "Kako ćeš pred Boga"
- Hotel "Čekanje" (2005)
  - "Kad odeš ti"
- Miraz (2008)
  - "Vikend"

Željko Joksimović

- Možda je to ljubav (2019)

Halid Bešlić

- U ime ljubavi (2000)
  - "Ne bolujem"
- Prvi poljubac (2003)
  - "Lijepa pa i pametna"
  - "Moja jedina"
  - "Plavo oko"
- Halid 08 (2007)
  - "Miljacka"
- Romanija (2013)
  - "Sijede"

Hari Mata Hari

- Ja te volim najviše na svijetu (1988)
  - "Ja te volim najviše na svijetu"
  - "Ruža bez trna"
  - "Zapleši"
- Volio bi' da te ne volim (1989)
  - "Volio bi' da te ne volim"
  - "Ti znaš sve"
  - "Na more dođite"
- Strah me da te volim (1990)
  - "Strah me da te volim"
  - "Prsten i zlatni lanac"
  - "Ostavi suze za kraj"
  - "Lud sam za tobom"
  - "Ne budi me"
  - "Otkud ti ko' sudbina"
  - "Nek' nebo nam sudi"
  - "Daj još jednom da čujem ti glas"
- Lejla (2006)

Jelena Karleuša

- Ženite se momci (1996)
  - "A sada idem"

Neda Ukraden

- Poslije nas (1990)
  - "Poslije nas"
  - "Ko te ne zna"
  - "Krijem da te volim"
  - "Ne zna srce"
  - "Idi, neću zaplakati"
  - "Zar čekala nisam dugo"

Severina Vučković

- Dobrodošao u klub (2012)
  - "Slaba na slabića"

Tajči

- Hajde da ludujemo (1990)
  - "Ti nemaš prava na mene"
  - "Nema više ljubavi"
- Bube u glavi (1991)
  - "Gori mi pod nogama"

Kimi

- '02 (2002)
  - "Lanci I Katanci"
