= Constitutional reform in Bosnia and Herzegovina =

Legal process in Bosnia and Herzegovina

The Constitution of Bosnia and Herzegovina was amended once, in 2009, to include the outcome of the Brčko District final award. Several constitutional reforms were attempted between 2006 and 2014, to ensure its compliance with the case law of the European Convention on Human Rights in the Sejdić and Finci v. Bosnia and Herzegovina and following cases (Zornić, Pilav) regarding ethnic- and residence-based discrimination in passive electoral rights for the Presidency and House of Peoples. None of these attempts have been successful so far, notwithstanding EU involvement and conditionality (between 2009 and 2014, constitutional reform was included as a precondition for the entry into force of the Stabilisation and Association Process between Bosnia and Herzegovina and the EU).

== Procedure ==
Administrative divisions of Bosnia and Herzegovina: Republika Srpska entity (1), Federation of Bosnia and Herzegovina entity (2) and Brčko District condominium (3).

In Article X, defining the amendment procedure, the Constitution of Bosnia and Herzegovina states that it can be amended by a decision of the Parliamentary Assembly, including a two-thirds majority of those present and voting in the House of Representatives of Bosnia and Herzegovina. The Constitution does not say who has the right, and under what rules, to present the amendments to the Parliamentary Assembly. Also, in the paragraph 2 of the Article X, the Constitution states that the rights and freedoms, as seen in the Article II, cannot be derogated, as well as the paragraph 2 itself.

== Chronology of Constitutional reform attempts ==
=== Accession to the Council of Europe and 2005 Venice Commission Opinion ===
Bosnia and Herzegovina became a member of the Council of Europe on 24 April 2002, thus committing to honour the obligations of membership stemming from Article 3 of the Statute of the Council of Europe, as well as the specific commitments listed in the Parliamentary Assembly of the Council of Europe (PACE) Opinion 234 (2002) on Bosnia and Herzegovina's application for membership, including the need to strengthen State institutions in relation to the entities, and to align the text of the Constitution to the Constitutional Court's decision on the "constituent peoples" case (U-5/98).

The PACE also tasked the Council of Europe's Venice Commission to assess whether the use of the High Representative's "Bonn Powers" respected the basic principles of the Council of Europe, whether the Constitution of Bosnia and Herzegovina was in compliance with the European Convention on Human Rights and the European Charter of Local Self-Government, as well as to generally review the rationality and functionality of the constitutional setup of the country.

In March 2005, the Venice Commission issued its advisory Opinion. It concluded that the Bonn Powers, although beneficial in the wake of the Bosnian War, do "not correspond to democratic principles when exercised without due process and the possibility of judicial control", and called for a "progressive phasing out of these powers and for the establishment of an advisory panel of independent lawyers for the decisions directly affecting the rights of individuals pending the end of the practice."

The Venice Commission also criticised the weakness of State-level institutions, left incapable to "effectively ensure compliance with the commitments of the country with respect to the Council of Europe and the international community in general", as well as the overlap of competences between the Presidency and the Council of Ministers, the lack of specific limitations for the use of the national interest veto, the entity veto, and the House of Peoples as a legislature. The Venice Commission also noted how unusual it was that the Constitution has been "drafted and adopted without involving the citizens of Bosnia and Herzegovina and without applying procedures which could have provided democratic legitimacy", and concluded that it was "unthinkable that Bosnia and Herzegovina can make real progress with the present constitutional arrangements." It thus made a connection between the phasing out of international supervision and a constitutional reform process to strengthen the domestic institutions.

In April 2005, Protocol XII to the European Convention on Human Rights – which establishes a general prohibition of discrimination – also came into force after ratification by 12 Council of Europe member states, including Bosnia and Herzegovina. Protocol XII would be key to the later European Court of Human Rights rulings against Bosnia and Herzegovina, including Sejdić and Finci.

=== 2006 April package ===
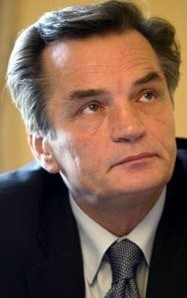
Haris Silajdžić and his party opposed and voted against the proposed April package.

The 2005 Opinion of the Venice Commission, which coincided with the 10th anniversary of the Dayton Agreement opened the debate on a constitutional reform in Bosnia and Herzegovina, on the impulse of U.S. diplomacy, with a view of modernizing the country's institutions. U.S. diplomat R. Nicholas Burns stated that this would entail moving towards an individual presidency, a stronger prime minister, and a stronger parliament with a stronger speaker; reforms should have been adopted ahead of the 2006 general election. Bosnian leaders also agreed in a joint statement to commit to a process that "will enhance the authorities of the state government and streamline parliament and the office of the Presidency".

Ambassador Douglas L. McElhaney in Sarajevo and Ambassador Donald Hays in Washington led the U.S. talks with party leaders and the initiative to draft a compromise proposal for constitutional amendments, dubbed the April Package (aprilski paket). Overall, the April Package would have better defined and partly expanded State competences, and streamlined institutions, partly limiting the veto powers of ethnic groups. The amended Constitution would have included:

- an individual President (with two deputies, one for each constituent people, to rotate every 16 months instead of 8), indirectly elected by the Parliament and with a more ceremonial role; the matters subject to consensus within the Presidency would have been reduced to only a few, including defence;
- a reinforced Chairman of the Council of Ministers, and the creation of two additional ministries (for agriculture and for technology and the environment)
- the codification in the Constitution of the competences de facto acquired by the state level in the previous period (defence, security, intelligence);
- a new category of shared competences between State and entities (taxation, justice and electoral affairs);
- a specific provision for European integration that would have allowed the State level to assume the necessary competences from the entities ("EU clause");
- the codification of the newly established State-level institutions (Court of Bosnia and Herzegovina, Prosecutor's Office, High Judicial and Prosecutorial Council and Indirect Tax Authority)
- an enlargement of Parliament:
  - 87 MPs (instead of 42) in the House of Representatives, including at least 3 "Others" (but "entity voting" would persist, with legislation approved if at least 1/3 of MPs elected from each entity would support it);
  - 21 MPs (instead of 15) in the House of Peoples indirectly elected from the House of Representatives rather than from the entities' Houses of Peoples. The competences of the House of Peoples would also be limited to Vital National Interest veto procedures.

At the moment of Parliamentary approval, the constitutional amendments failed by 2 votes, only gathering 26 MPs in favour over 42, instead of the required 42. This was due to the maximalist pre-electoral positions taken by Haris Silajdžić's Party for Bosnia and Herzegovina (SBiH) (wishing to also abolish entity voting) and by the Croatian Democratic Union 1990 splinter party, who felt the proposal did not sufficiently protect the Bosnian Croats. The U.S. would try to rescue the April Package by facilitating further talks in 2007 between Milorad Dodik and Silajdžić, but to no avail.

Following the replacement of High Representative Paddy Ashdown with Christian Schwarz-Schilling in late 2006, the latter aimed at promoting "local ownership" and fostering the closure of the Office of the High Representative (OHR), including by finalising constitutional reform talks. Differently than the closed-door approach taken by U.S. diplomacy for the April Package, Schwartz-Schilling aimed to set up a "constitutional convention" to foster public debate and break the monopoly of ethno-nationalist parties. He proposed a law-based constitutional commission, to be nominated by the Bosnian Parliament, with three co-chairs (a Bosnian intellectual and one each from the U.S. and the EU) and a technical secretariat composed equally of Bosnians and internationals. Although Germany was ready to finance it, the proposal was not welcomed by the EU Council (who deemed it too internationally driven) and by the Commission (who was worried the initiative would complicate the ongoing talks around police reform). The Croatian Democratic Union (HDZ BiH) also soon withdrew its support, and the initiative faded away in the summer of 2007. Feeling a lack of confidence from Brussels, Schwarz-Schilling decided to resign.

=== 2008 Prud Agreement ===
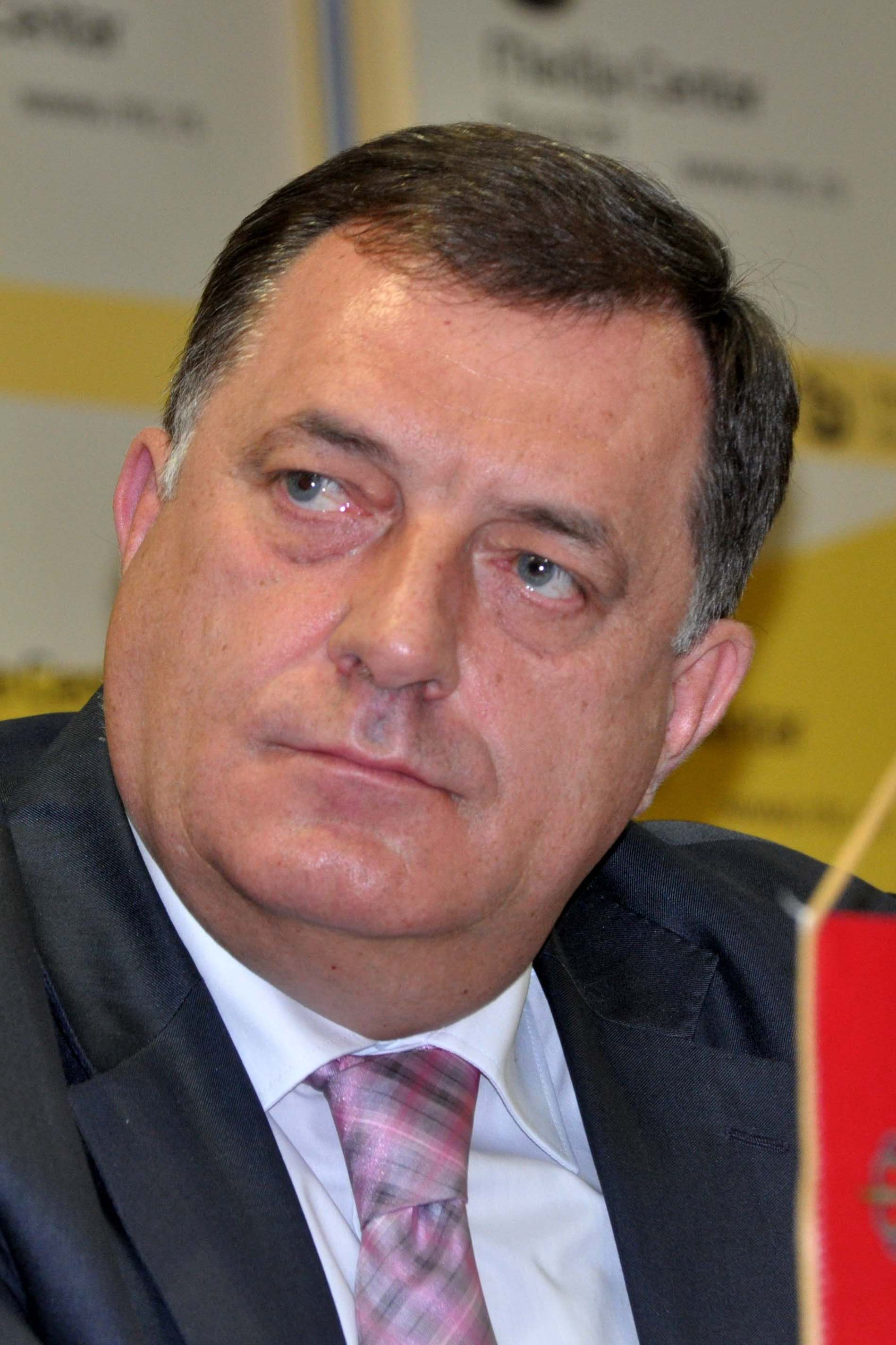
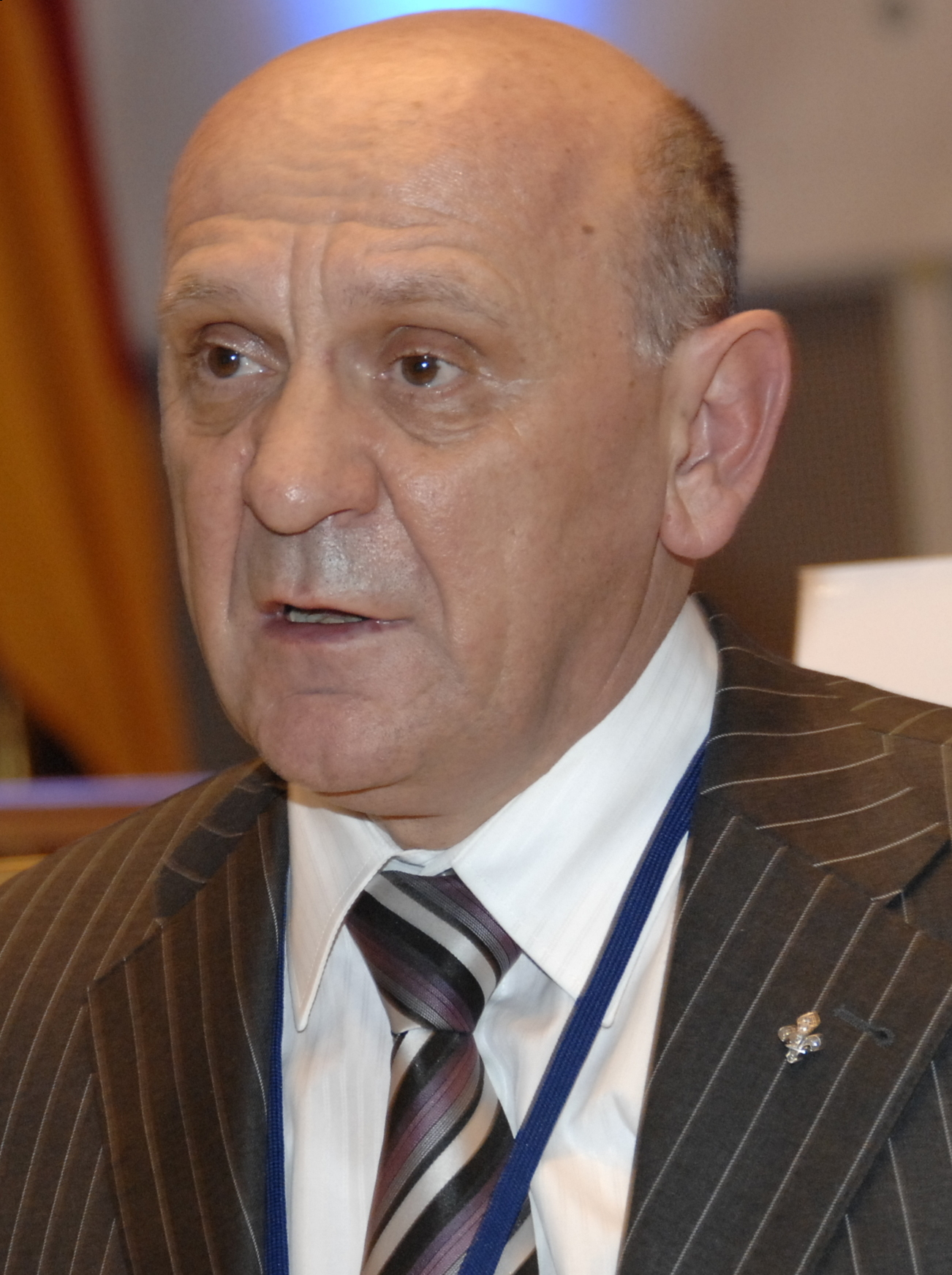
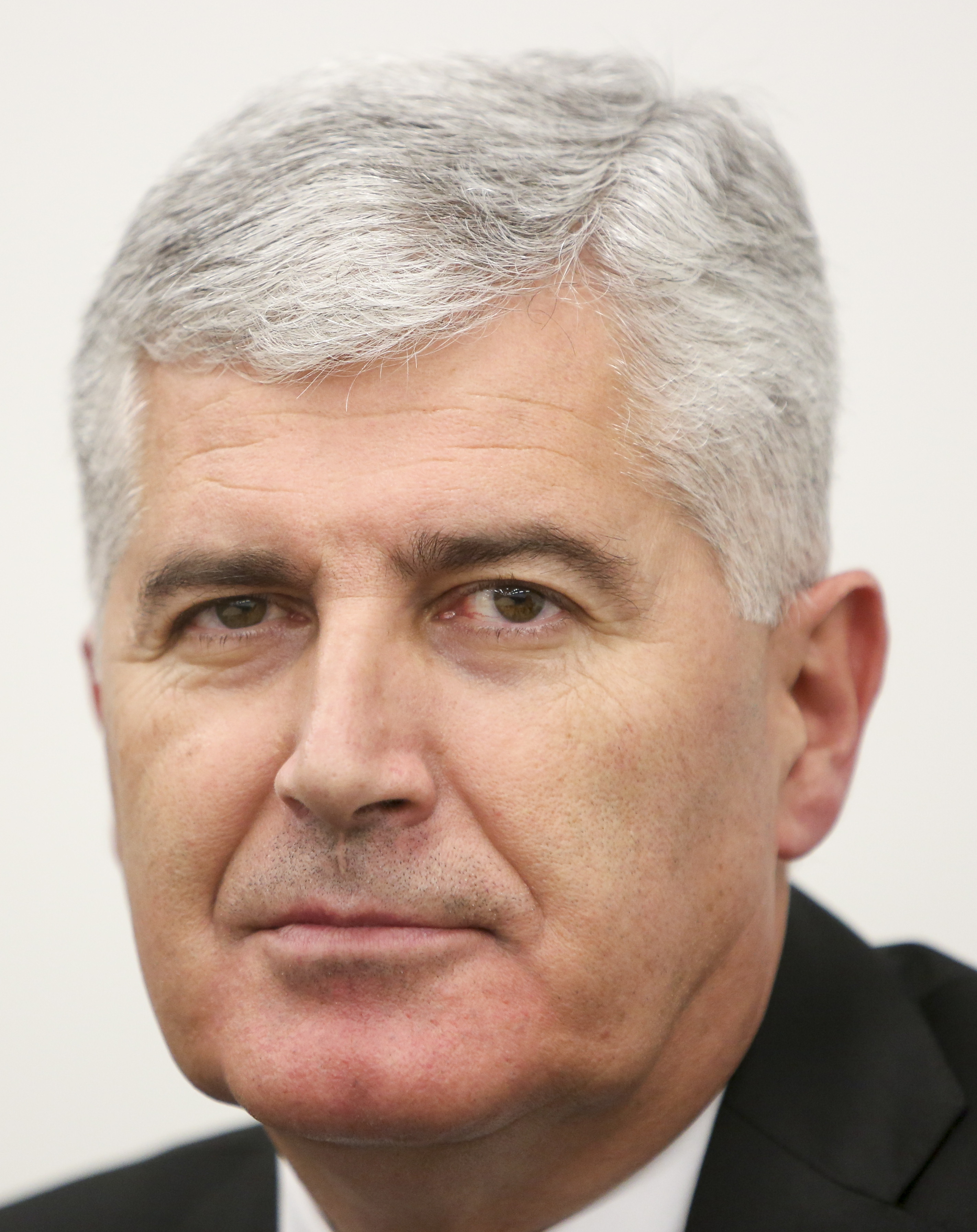
The leaders of the three most important 'ethnic' political parties, Milorad Dodik (left), Sulejman Tihić (middle) and Dragan Čović, created the Prud Agreement.

Constitutional reform talks restarted in 2008, after the end of the police reform process (and the ensuing signature of the Stabilisation and Association Process between Bosnia and Herzegovina and the EU) and the municipal elections. On 8 November 2008, the leaders of the three main national parties (Milorad Dodik for the SNSD, Sulejman Tihić for the SDA and Dragan Čović for the HDZ BiH) signed a joint agreement in Prud stating their aim of harmonising the Bosnian Constitution with the European Convention on Human Rights, to clarify state competences and establish functional institutions, and to reorganise the middle layers of governance, including settling the legal status of Brčko. The Prud statement also explicitly called for amendments to be drafted with the expert assistance of international institutions.

Despite monthly meetings of party leaders, the "Prud Agreement" did not lead to a compromise on territorial reorganisation, as Tihić and Čović saw the talks as a way to abolish the entities with four non-ethnic regions, while Dodik aimed to entrench the right of Republika Srpska to secede after a three-year period. Dodik also started to further challenge the OHR and call for the repatriation of competences to the entities, relying on the growing support of Russia.

The only concrete result, upon U.S. pressure, was the agreement to amend the Bosnian Constitution to incorporate Brčko District under the jurisdiction of the state institution and of the Constitutional Court, as had been settled by the Brčko arbitration process.

=== 2009 Butmir process ===
A renewed push for constitutional reforms came in late 2009, in view of the upcoming Sejdić and Finci ruling of the European Court of Human Rights and of the 2010 general election, despite diverging views between U.S. and EU actors. The United States and EU organised a retreat at the Butmir military base outside Sarajevo on 9 October 2009, attended by U.S. diplomat James Steinberg, EU Commissioner Olli Rehn and Swedish foreign minister, as well as former High Representative, Carl Bildt for the Presidency of the Council of the European Union. The Butmir draft aimed at taking over most elements of the April Package, as well as including a specific paragraph clarifying that only the state of Bosnia and Herzegovina could apply for membership in international organisations, and that it was empowered to assume competences from the entities to that aim. Yet, domestic consensus proved elusive, as each of the parties was stuck on maximalist positions. The draft was deemed too centralistic for the SNSD and the HDZ BiH, and not enough for the Social Democratic Party (SDP BiH) and the SBiH. Only the SDA was explicitly in favour. After two fruitless sessions, the talks were ended right before the European Court of Human Rights issued its Sejdić and Finci ruling in November 2009.

=== 2009 Sejdić and Finci v. Bosnia and Herzegovina case ===
In 2009, the European Court of Human Rights ruled in Sejdić and Finci v. Bosnia and Herzegovina, a case filed by Dervo Sejdić and Jakob Finci, two Bosnian citizens of Romani and Jewish ethnicity, and are therefore ineligible for running for the Presidency. The court determined that this restriction (an estimated 400,000 Bosnian citizens, 12 per cent of the population, cannot run for the Presidency due to their religion, ethnicity, or place of residence) violates the European Convention on Human Rights. Four subsequent cases also found that the constitution is discriminatory. However, as of 2022, it has yet to be amended.

=== 2010–2012 parliamentary talks ===
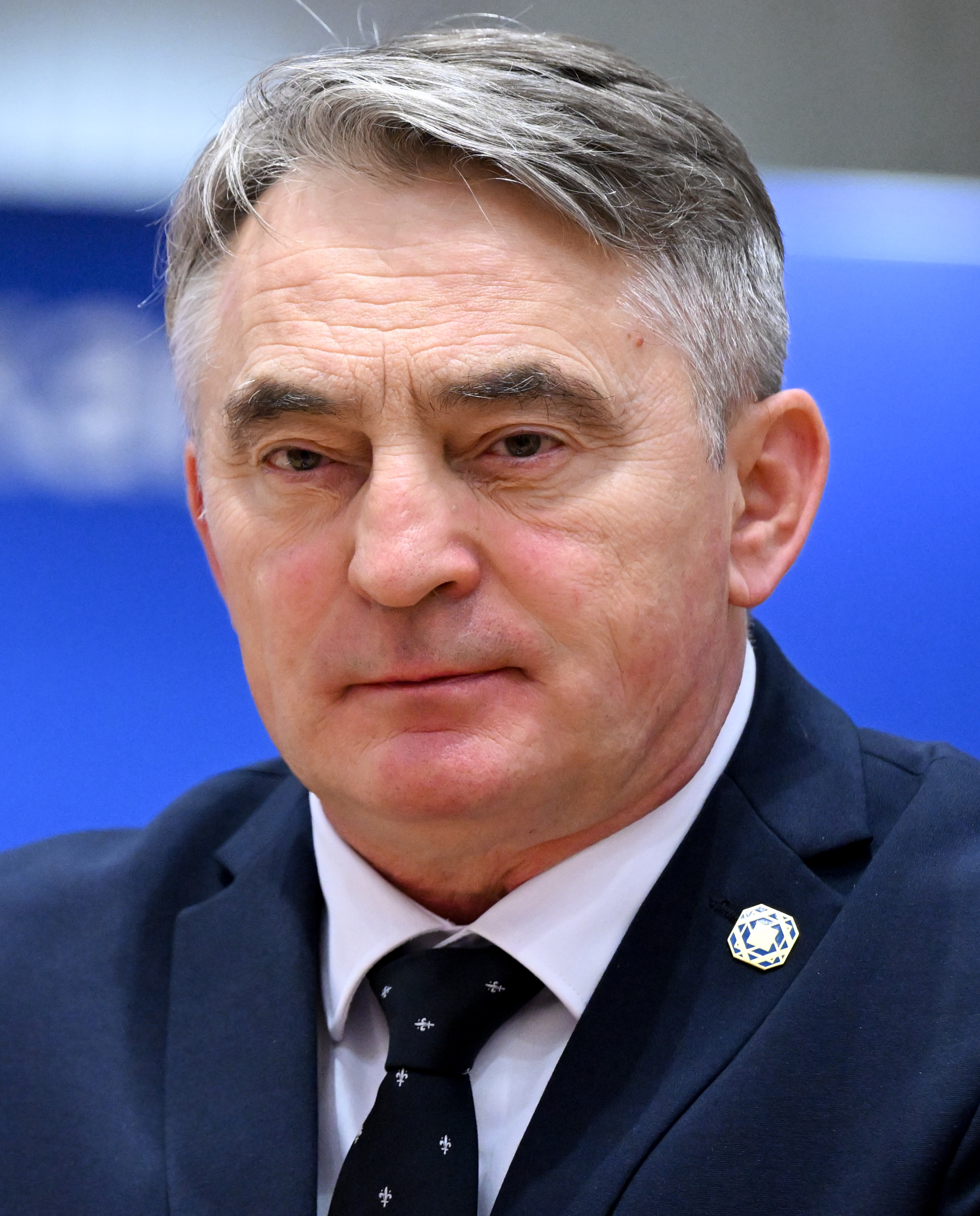
Željko Komšić was elected to the post of Croat member of the Bosnian Presidency mostly by Bosniak voters, thus deeming him to be an illegitimate representative of Croat interests.

The European Court of Human Rights ruling meant one further narrowing down of the constitutional reform agenda to issues of the European Convention on Human Rights compliance. This also meant finding a solution for the "Croat issue", i.e. the HDZ BiH's grievance following the defeat of Ivo Miro Jović in the 2006 general election by Željko Komšić (SDP BiH) thanks to cross-ethnic voting. A Parliamentary committee was tasked to discuss reforms in the spring of 2010, with no results. Election were held in October 2010, with no changes.

Although signed in 2008, the Stabilisation and Association Process with the EU had not been ratified by all EU member states. The implementation of the Sejdić–Finci ruling was included as part of EU conditionality for the entry into force of the Stabilisation and Association Process in the political conclusions of the EU Council of 21 March 2011, which spoke more broadly of the "compliance of the Constitution with the European Convention on Human Rights".

Despite the political stalemate in the formation of a new government, between October 2010 and March 2012, the Parliament continued talks in the framework of a "Joint Ad Hoc Committee for the Implementation of the judgment of the European Court of Human Rights in the case of Sejdić and Finci v. Bosnia and Herzegovina", composed of 11 MPs from the House of Representatives and 2 MPs from the House of Peoples, headed by House of Representatives member Šefik Džaferović. While the committee agreed to add 3 representatives of the "Others" to the national House of Peoples (two elected from the Federation of Bosnia and Herzegovina and one from Republika Srpska), no solution was found for the Presidency, with Bosnian Serbs insisting for direct election of their member, and Bosnian Croats calling for either indirect election or a separate constituency to avoid future Komšić cases.

=== 2012–2014 EU-mediated talks ===
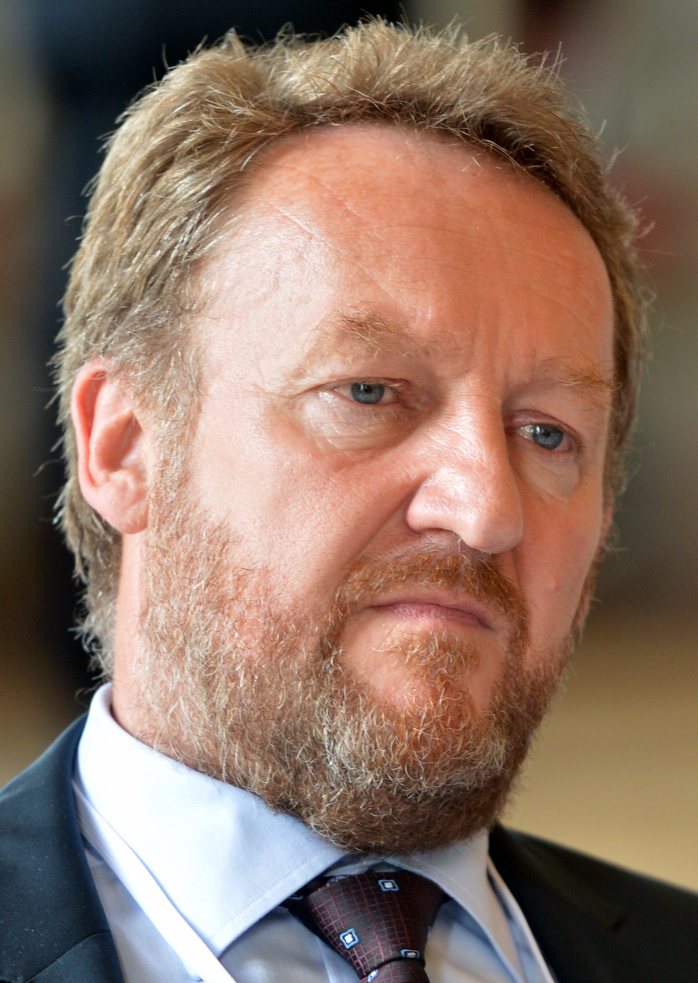
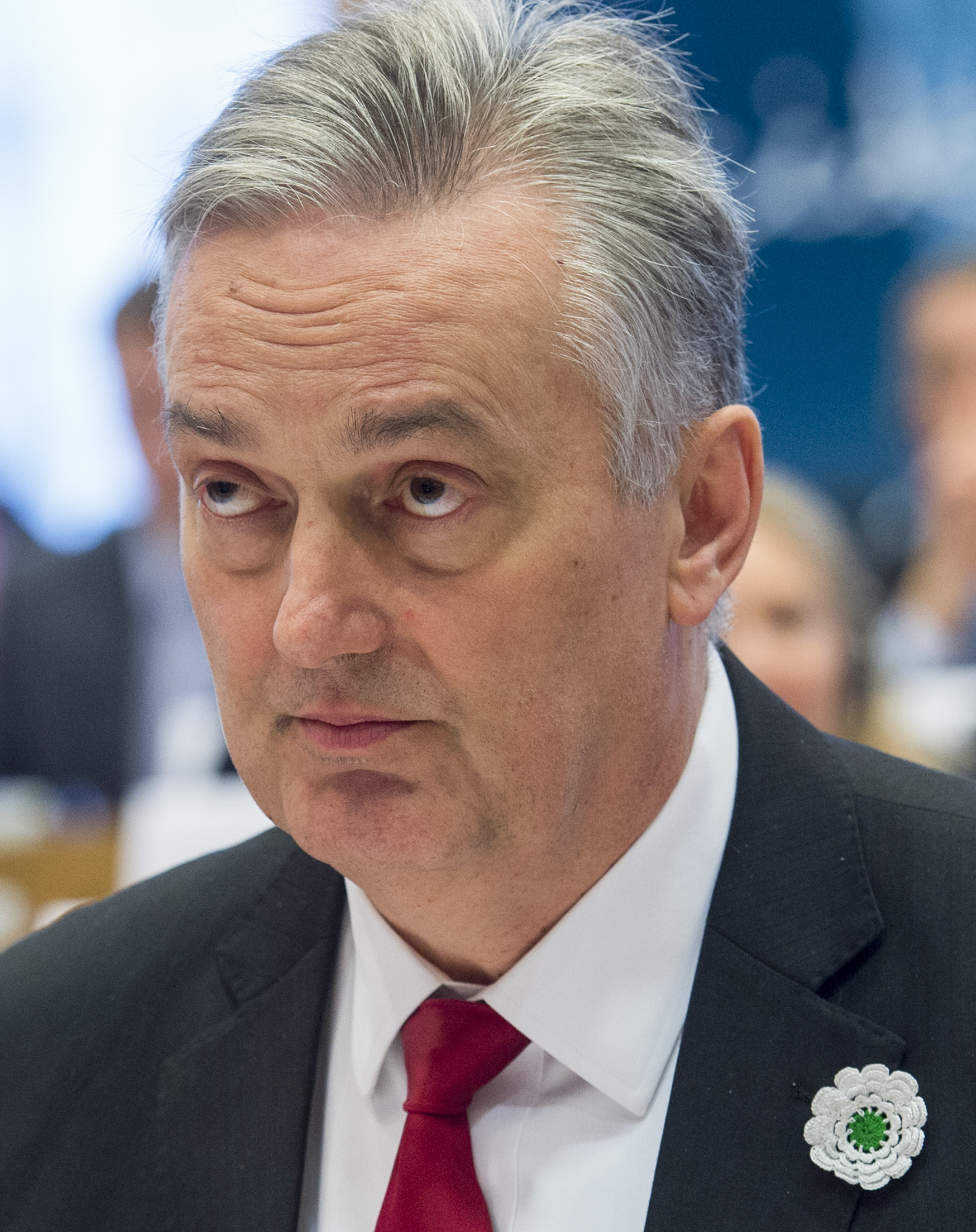
Bakir Izetbegović (left) and Zlatko Lagumdžija are both supporters of a unitary-composed Bosnia and Herzegovina.

As "credible efforts" towards the implementation of the Sejdić–Finci ruling remained the outstanding condition for the entry into force of the Stabilisation and Association Process, in June 2012, EU Commissioner Štefan Füle launched a High Level Dialogue on the Accession Process (HLAD) with Bosnia and Herzegovina, tackling both the Sejdić–Finci issue and the need for a coordination mechanism for the country to speak with a single voice in the accession process. Talks were held in June and November 2012, with little success.

In the summer of 2012, HDZ BiH and SDP BiH leaders Dragan Čović and Zlatko Lagumdžija agreed on the indirect election of the Bosnian Presidency members by the Bosnian Parliament, but the deal was not turned into detailed amendments. The HDZ BiH kept calling for electoral reform to prevent new Komšić cases. The same Željko Komšić left the SDP BiH, in dissent with the agreement which would have excluded him from acceding to power again. The SDA also opposed it, as it would have created a further asymmetry, with one Presidency member (from Republika Srpska) elected directly, and two elected indirectly.

In February 2013, the European Commission decided to step up its involvement, with the direct facilitation of talks by Füle, in coordination with the Council of Europe's secretary-general Thorbjørn Jagland. In March and April 2013, with the support of the Director-General for Enlargement Stefano Sannino, the EU Delegation in Sarajevo facilitated a series of direct talks between party leaders, but with no concrete outcome.

During the summer of 2013, Čović and Bosnian Presidency member Bakir Izetbegović reached a political agreement on several files, from Mostar to Sejdić–Finci, in parallel to the initiative led by the U.S. Embassy for a constitutional reform of the Federal entity. An agreement on principles on how to solve the Sejdić–Finci issue was signed by political leaders in Brussels on 1 October 2013, but it evaporated right after. Three further rounds of negotiations among political leaders were led together with Füle, in a castle near Prague in November 2013, and later in Sarajevo in the first months of 2014, also with the presence of the U.S. and the Venice Commission. Despite high hopes, a solution could not be found, as the HDZ BiH required the absolute arithmetical certainty of being able to occupy the third seat of the Bosnian Presidency – which, given that the Sejdić–Finci ruling was actually about removing ethnic discrimination in the access to the same Presidency, could not be provided by any possible model. Talks were ended on 17 February 2014, while popular protests were ongoing in Sarajevo and in the rest of the country.

== Entity-level constitutional reforms ==
=== Federation of Bosnia and Herzegovina ===
The Constitution of the Federation of Bosnia and Herzegovina has been amended over 109 times since its adoption, mainly via impositions of the High Representative to ensure compliance with the decisions of the Constitutional Court of Bosnia and Herzegovina. No consolidated version has been adopted by the Federal Parliament so far.

In parallel to EU-facilitated talks on the Sejdić-Finci issue at State level, in February 2013, the U.S. Embassy supported an expert working group which presented its 188 recommendations to the Federal House of Representatives, aiming to address the costly and complex governance structures with overlapping competences between the Federation, the Cantons and the municipalities as currently entailed in the Federal Constitution. The initiative was, ultimately, not adopted by Parliament.

== Reform proposals by Bosnian civil society ==
- In September 2003, a group of intellectuals in the framework of the Academy of Sciences and Arts of Bosnia and Herzegovina, led by Mesud Sabitović, drafted proposals for constitutional changes which would have defined Bonsnia and Herzegovina as a federal republic. The proposals were forwarded to the Parliamentary, but not taken forward.
- In 2007, the Sarajevo-based NGO Foreign Policy Initiative (VPI) issued the report 'Governance Structures in Bosnia and Herzegovina: Capacity, Ownership, EU Integration, Functioning State', in which, among other things, it recommended substantial reforms along the lines of the April Package, and including an EU Supremacy Clause.
- The Swiss Agency for Development and Cooperation Office in Bosnia and Herzegovina (SDC) supported a multi-year project entitled 'Contribution to Constitutional Reform' (CCR), engaging many prominent domestic NGOs such as the Human Rights Center of the University of Sarajevo (HRC), ACIPS, the Institute for Social Science Research at the Faculty of Political Science in Sarajevo, the Association of Democratic Initiatives (ADI) and the entity associations of cities and municipalities. Two of the Swiss implementing partners, ACIPS and the Law Institute, developed packages of reform proposals, largely in line with the Venice Commission and April Package guidelines.
- USAID and the National Endowment for Democracy supported the Forum Građana Tuzle (Forum of the Citizens of Tuzla) in preparing a proposal for constitutional reform.
- An informal network of women's NGOs proposed a package as well, focused on gender equality and women's rights.
- The group Coalition 143 (K143) calls for decentralization of powers to the municipal level and the abolition of entities and cantons. The idea was first spearheaded by the mayor of Foča, Zdravko Krsmanović.
- The Green Council advocates for sector-specific constitutional reform, including a state-level Ministry of Agriculture.

== Reform proposals by foreign think tanks ==
- In 2004, the European Stability Initiative proposed to abolish the Federal entity and have a federal system with 10 cantons, Republika Srpska and Brčko District on the same level, below the State.
- In 2014, the International Crisis Group proposed a summary of various models, including:
  - a three-entity Bosnia and Herzegovina, catering to Bosnian Croat political aims;
  - a model based on Belgium's linguistic communities, which could "give territorially flexible political substance to the three [political] communities";
  - a simplified federal model, based on the abolition of the Federation of Bosnia and Herzegovina (cf. ESI 2004);
  - a federal but liberal Bosnia and Herzegovina (for which they assess there is no political feasibility);
  - a model based on the Swiss "directoire", merging the Presidency and Council of Ministers in a single executive body, gathering the most-voted MPs, with a mandatory coalition rule based on electoral results (p. 29-33);
  - a model based on municipalization, with the abolition of the cantons, possibly coupled with an association of Croat-majority municipalities and a mandatory coalition at the Federal level (p. 33-34);

== Bibliography ==
- Bajrović, Reuf (2005), BiH municipalities and the EU: Direct participation of citizens in policy-making at the local level, Central European University
- Hays, Don and Jason Crosby (2006), From Dayton to Brussels: Constitutional Preparations for Bosnia's EU Accession, US Institute of Peace
- Perry, Valery (2015): Constitutional Reform in Bosnia and Herzegovina: Does the Road to Confederation go through the EU?, International Peacekeeping, DOI: 10.1080/13533312.2015.1100082
- Democratization PolicyCouncil, Understanding and Breaking Bosnia and Herzegovina's Constitutional Deadlock: A New Approach for the European Union and United States
- European Stability Initiative (2004), Making Federalism Work – A Radical Proposal for Practical Reform
- Foreign Policy Initiative (2009), Role of Civil Society in BiH Constitutional Reform, Sarajevo, July 2009
- Foundation Public Law Center, Database of all reform document proposals
- International Crisis Group (2012), Bosnia's Gordian Knot: Constitutional Reform
- International Crisis Group (2014), Bosnia's Future
