= Knežina =

Knežina may refer to:

- Knežina, Sokolac, a village in the municipality of Sokolac, Republika Srpska, Bosnia and Herzegovina
- Knežina, Črnomelj, a settlement in the municipality of Črnomelj, Slovenia

or:

- Knežina (Ottoman Serbia), a historical subdivision in Serbia

or:

- Knežina Monastery, monastery in Knežina near Sokolac
