= Sulejman Tihić =

Bosnian politician (1951–2014)

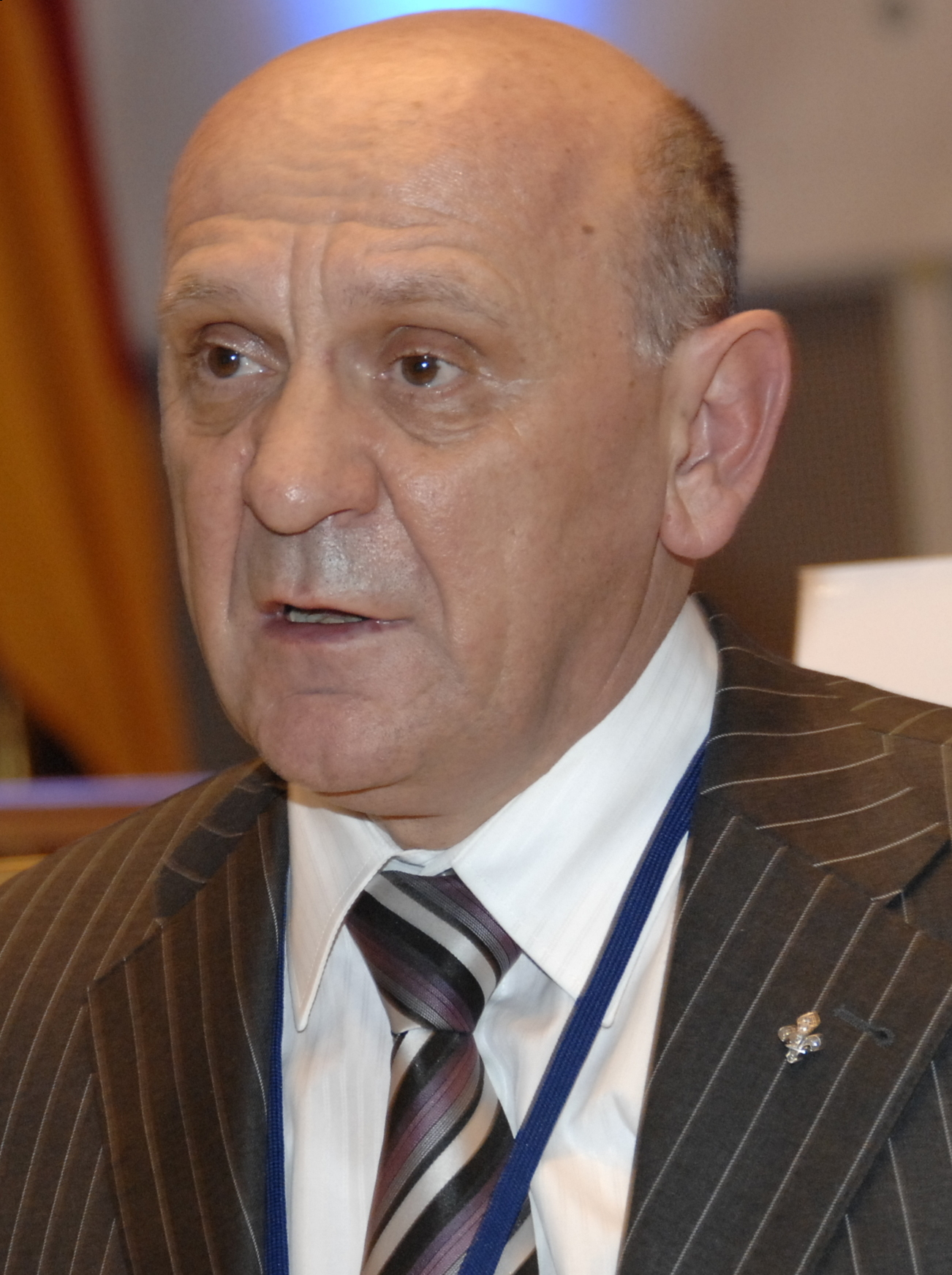
- Tihić in 2009

Bosniak member of the Presidency of Bosnia and Herzegovina
- In office 28 October 2002 – 6 November 2006 (Note: Serving as the Chairman of the Presidency from 28 February 2004 to 28 October 2004, and from 28 February 2006 to 6 November 2006.)
- Prime Minister: Dragan Mikerević; Adnan Terzić
- Preceded by: Beriz Belkić
- Succeeded by: Haris Silajdžić
Parliamentary offices
Member of the House of Peoples
In office
14 March 2007 – 25 September 2014
Additional positions
President of the Party of Democratic Action
In office 13 October 2001 – 25 September 2014
Preceded by	Alija Izetbegović
Succeeded by	Bakir Izetbegović

Personal details
- Born: 26 November 1951 Bosanski Šamac, PR Bosnia and Herzegovina, FPR Yugoslavia
- Died: 25 September 2014 (aged 62) Sarajevo, Bosnia and Herzegovina
- Party: Party of Democratic Action (1990–2014)
- Spouse: Jasminka Tihić
- Children: 3
- Education: University of Sarajevo (LLB)

Sulejman Tihić (26 November 1951 – 25 September 2014) was a Bosnian politician who served as the Bosniak member of the Presidency of Bosnia and Herzegovina from 2002 to 2006. He also served as the second president of the Party of Democratic Action (SDA) from 2001 until his death in 2014. From 2007 until his death, Tihić served as member of the national House of Peoples.

Born in Bosanski Šamac, he graduated from the Faculty of Law at the University of Sarajevo in 1975. Following his graduation, Tihić worked as a judge, prosecutor and a lawyer. During the Bosnian War of 1992–95, he was captured by Serb soldiers and was tortured in concentration camps in both Bosnia and Serbia. Following the war, Tihić entered into politics. Already being a founding member of the SDA, he was named its president in 2001. In the 2002 general election, Tihić was elected Bosniak member of the Bosnian Presidency, serving as its member until losing his bid for re-election in 2006. Following his term in the Presidency, Tihić was appointed member of the national House of Peoples in 2007. As president of the SDA, he has played a key role in constitutional reform negotiations, including the Prud Agreement, and the 2010–2012 government formation.

After years of health issues, including cancer, Tihić died on 25 September 2014 in Sarajevo, at the age of 62. He was buried in his hometown of Bosanski Šamac two days later. Tihić was known for his moderate and conciliatory political stance, and for promoting interethnic dialogue and compromise during his political tenure.

== Early life ==
Tihić was born in the town of Bosanski Šamac in northern Bosnia on 26 November 1951. He obtained a degree from the Sarajevo Law School in 1975. Tihić returned to Bosanski Šamac where he worked as a judge, prosecutor and a lawyer.

== Bosnian War ==
When the Bosnian War started in April 1992, Tihić was captured by Serb soldiers and was tortured in three concentration camps in Bosnia, in Bosanski Šamac, Brčko and the Batković camp in Bijeljina, before being taken by helicopter to the Batajnica neighborhood of Belgrade in Serbia. He was also later tortured in a prison in Sremska Mitrovica.

== Political career ==
In 1990, Tihić was one of the founding members of the Party of Democratic Action (SDA). On 13 October 2001, he was chosen to succeed Alija Izetbegović as president of the party. In the 2002 general election, he was elected to the Presidency of Bosnia and Herzegovina. In the 2006 general election, Tihić ran for a second term in the Presidency, but failed to do so when election day came, winning only 27.5% of the votes, 35.3% less than elected Haris Silajdžić.

After the presidency, Tihić would go on to be a member of the House of Peoples of the Parliamentary Assembly of Bosnia and Herzegovina from 14 April 2007 until his death on 25 September 2014. American human rights lawyer Francis Boyle stated in his correspondence to the public that Tihić and Sakib Softić had ordered the restitution request from his original lawsuit in the Bosnian genocide case to be voided, thereby returning a favor to his coalition partners, the Alliance of Independent Social Democrats (SNSD) in Republika Srpska.

=== Prud Agreement ===
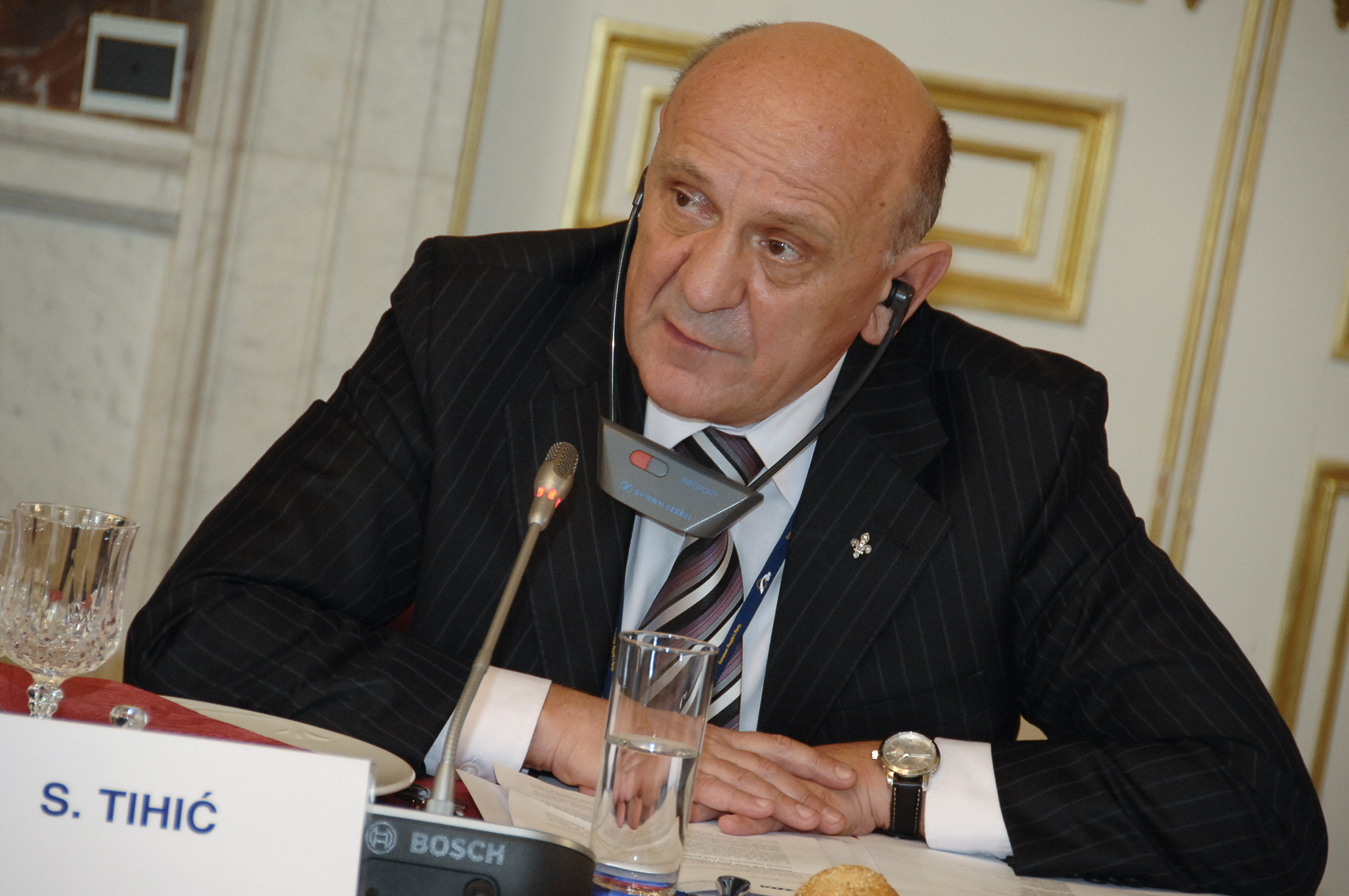
Tihić at a European People's Party summit, 29 October 2009

Together with the leaders of the three most important 'nationalist' political parties in Bosnia and Herzegovina, who acted as representatives of the constituent peoples, Milorad Dodik of the SNSD and Dragan Čović of the Croatian Democratic Union (HDZ BiH), Tihić created the Prud Agreement or Prud Process, an agreement that pertained to state property, census, constitutional changes, reconstructing the Council of Ministers of Bosnia and Herzegovina and solving the legal status of Brčko District. The agreement was created in the village of Prud on 8 November 2008. The reforms promised by the agreement would "build the ability of the State to meet the requirements of the EU integration process".

At a subsequent meeting in Banja Luka on 26 January 2009, the party leaders set out a plan for Bosnia and Herzegovina as a decentralized country with three levels of government. The middle level of government was anticipated to be made up by four territorial units with legislative, executive and judicial branches of government.

Controversy surrounded the creation of a third entity, Republika Srpska's territorial integrity, and the division of Bosnia and Herzegovina. A further meeting was held in Mostar on 23 February 2009, hosted by Čović.

Despite monthly meetings of party leaders, the Prud Agreement did not lead to a compromise on territorial reorganisation, as Tihić and Čović saw the talks as a way to abolish the entities with four non-ethnic regions, while Dodik aimed to entrench the right of Republika Srpska to secede after a three-year period. Dodik also started to further challenge the Office of the High Representative and call for the repatriation of competences to the entities, relying on the growing support of Russia. On 20 July 2009, High Representative Valentin Inzko suggested that the process between the three 'nationalist' parties had effectively ended. Instead, it had changed into a process involving many more political parties. Inzko believed that minor-level constitutional reform can be delivered through the meetings.

The only concrete result, upon U.S. pressure, was the agreement to amend the Bosnian Constitution to incorporate Brčko District under the jurisdiction of the state institution and of the Constitutional Court, as had been settled by the Brčko arbitration process.

=== Butmir process ===
A renewed push for constitutional reforms came in late 2009, in view of the upcoming Sejdić and Finci ruling of the European Court of Human Rights and of the 2010 general election, despite diverging views between U.S. and EU actors. The United States and EU organised a retreat at the Butmir military base outside Sarajevo on 9 October 2009, attended by U.S. diplomat James Steinberg, EU Commissioner Olli Rehn and Swedish foreign minister, as well as former High Representative, Carl Bildt for the Presidency of the Council of the European Union. The Butmir draft aimed at taking over most elements of the April Package, as well as including a specific paragraph clarifying that only the state of Bosnia and Herzegovina could apply for membership in international organisations, and that it was empowered to assume competences from the entities to that aim.

Ultimately, domestic consensus proved elusive, as each of the parties was stuck on maximalist positions. The draft was deemed too centralistic for the SNSD and the HDZ BiH, and not enough for the Social Democratic Party (SDP BiH) and the Party for Bosnia and Herzegovina. Only Tihić and the SDA were explicitly in favour. After two fruitless sessions, talks were ended right before the European Court of Human Rights issued its Sejdić and Finci ruling in November 2009.

=== 2010–2012 government formation ===
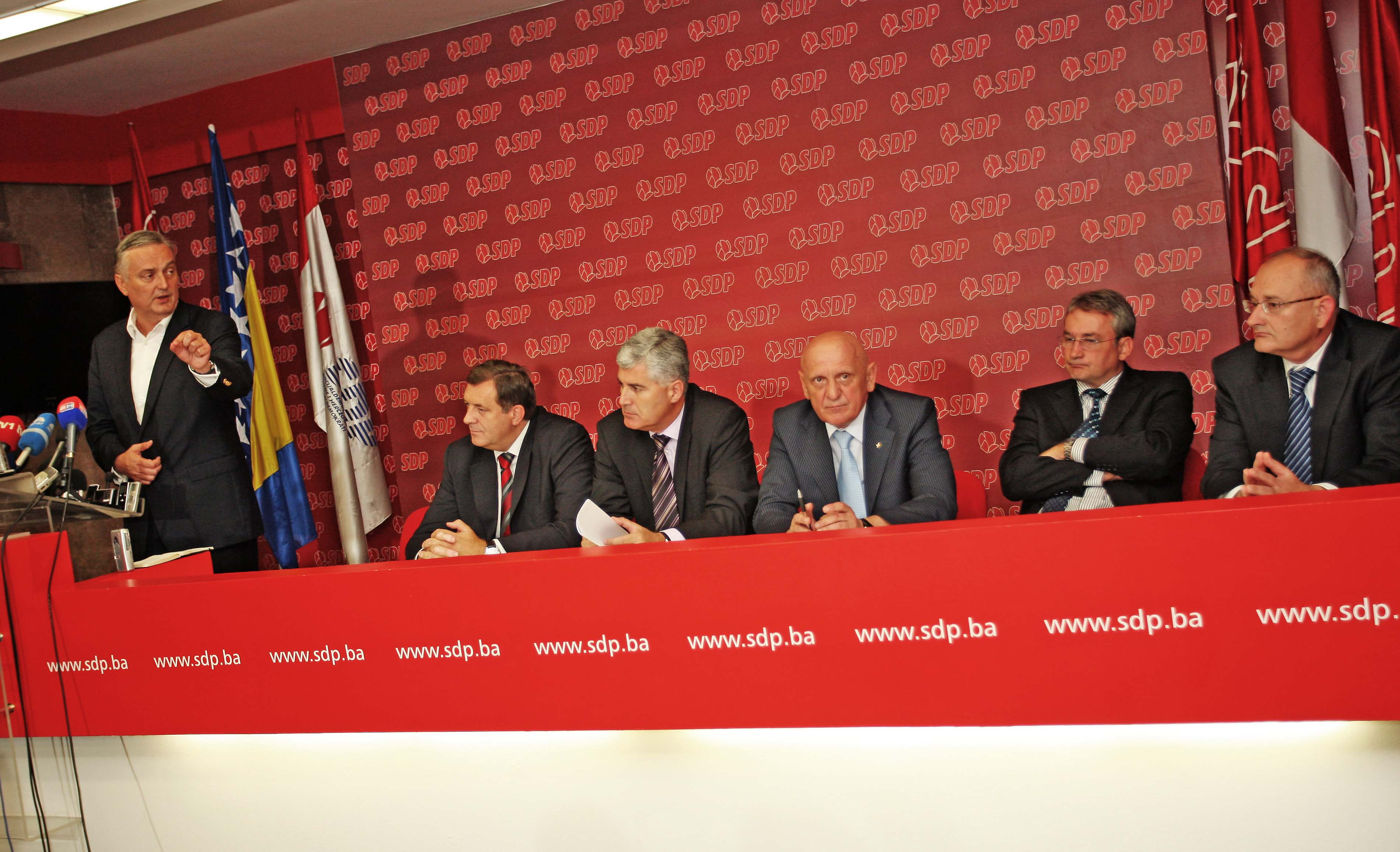
Tihić alongside other Bosnian political leaders during government formation talks, 15 September 2011

Following the 2010 general election, a process of formation of Bosnia and Herzegovina's Council of Ministers began. The resulting election produced a fragmented political landscape without a coalition of a parliamentary majority more than a year after the election. The centre-left SDP BiH, and the Bosnian Serb autonomist SNSD, each had 8 MPs of the total 42 MPs of the House of Representatives.

The major Croat (HDZ BiH and HDZ 1990) and Serb parties (SNSD and SDS) contended that a gentlemen's agreement existed in which the chairmanship of the Council of Ministers rotates between the three constitutional nationalities. In this case, it would be the turn of a Croat politician to chair the council. As the HDZ BiH and the Croatian Democratic Union 1990 (HDZ 1990) received the overwhelming share of Croat votes in the 2010 general election, the parties demanded that a member of one of them receive the position of chairman. The SDP BiH on the other hand, claimed that the only necessity is the ethnicity of the individual, and not the party, demanding the right to appoint a Croat Chairman from SDP BiH ranks, calling upon the right of having assumed most votes nationwide.

The European Union and the Office of the High Representative repeatedly attempted negotiations to appease the Bosniak and Serb–Croat divided political blocs, in parallel to the Bosnian constitutional crisis, all ending in failure. The Bosniak coalition insisted that the seat would have to go to them as the party that received the largest number of votes, while the Serb–Croat alliance insisted that due to the fact that according to tradition, the next Chairman of the Council of Ministers must be an ethnic Croat, it must come from an authentic Croat party, and not the multi-ethnic SDP BiH.

A round of talks between party leaders was held in Mostar on 5 September 2011, hosted by Croat politicians Božo Ljubić and Dragan Čović, with Milorad Dodik, Mladen Bosić, Tihić and Zlatko Lagumdžija in attendance. The parties agreed to a further round of discussion in mid-September. A meeting between the six major party leaders was held in Sarajevo on 15 September, hosted by Lagumdžija. Topics discussed at the meeting included holding a national census, military assets and the Sejdić-Finci ruling. On the same day, an EU spokesperson warned that the country risked losing funding through the Instrument for Pre-Accession Assistance if the political situation did not stabilize. Another meeting on 26 September 2011 failed as well.

An agreement was finally reached on 28 December 2011 between the six political parties: the Social Democratic Party, Tihić's SDA, the Croatian Democratic Union, the Croatian Democratic Union 1990, the Serb Democratic Party and the SNSD. Vjekoslav Bevanda, a Bosnian Croat and member of the HDZ BiH, became the new Chairman of the Council of Ministers.

== Illness and death ==
Tihić had a tumor on his colon removed in January 2008 in Ljubljana, Slovenia. On 30 September 2013 it was announced that Tihić had been diagnosed with cancer. He was treated surgically in Germany on 4 October 2013; doctors expressed satisfaction with his recovery. On 22 August 2014, he was hospitalized at the Clinical Center of the University of Sarajevo and died there on 25 September 2014, aged 62. Tihić was buried in the cemetery of the White Mosque in his hometown of Bosanski Šamac two days later, on 27 September.
