= Otrov =

Studio album by Halid Bešlić
- Released: 1986
- Genre: Folk
- Label: Jugoton

Halid Bešlić chronology
Zbogom noći, zbogom zore (1985)	Otrov (1986)	Zajedno smo jači (1986)

Otrov (English translation: Poison) is the fifth studio album of Bosnian singer Halid Bešlić. It was released in 1986.

== Track listing ==
1. Otrov mi dajte (Give Me Poison)
2. Vraćam se majci u Bosnu (I Am Returning to my Mother in Bosnia)
3. Ona je opijum (She is Opium)
4. Limun žut (Yellow Lemon)
5. Mujo, Halil i Vila (Muyo, Halil and Vila)
6. Ja žalim ružu (I Regret the Rose)
7. Čarobna frula (The Magic Flute)
8. Hej, lijepa ženo (Hey, Beautiful Woman)
