= Sijedi starac =

Studio album by Halid Bešlić
- Released: 1981
- Genre: Folk
- Label: Diskoton

Halid Bešlić chronology
Sijedi starac (1981)	Pjesma samo o njoj (1982)

Sijedi starac (English translation: White Haired Old Man) is the first studio album by Bosnian singer Halid Bešlić. It was released in 1981.

== Track listing ==
1. Sijedi starac (White-Haired Old Man)
2. Sanjam majku, sanjam staru kuću (I Dream of my Mother, I Dream of my Old Home)
3. Dani ljubavi (Days of Love)
4. Zašto je moralo tako da bude (Why Did it Have to be Like That?)
5. Nećes saznati koliko te volim (You Wouldn't Guess How Much I Love You)
6. Pet godina volio sam tebe (For Five Years I Loved You)
7. Volim te (I Love You)
8. Ti bila si moja želja (You Were My Wish)
