= Ljiljani =

Studio album by Halid Bešlić
- Released: 1991
- Genre: Folk
- Length: 29:53
- Label: Cenex

Halid Bešlić chronology
Opet sam se zaljubio (1990)	Ljiljani (1991)	Grade moj (1993)

Ljiljani (English translation: Lilies) is the tenth studio album of Bosnian singer Halid Bešlić. It was released in 1991.

== Track listing ==
No.	Title	Length
1.	"Ljiljani (Lilies)"	4:36
2.	"Zadnji put sam ovdje, druže (This is the Last Time I'll Be Here, My Friend)"	4:18
3.	"Zarobljenik vina (Prisoner of Wine)"	3:29
4.	"Rastanak (Breakup)"	3:56
5.	"Nikom više ne vjerujem ja (I Do Not Believe Anybody Anymore)"	3:41
6.	"Oči njene (Her Eyes)"	3:19
7.	"Uzalud je vino (Wine is in Vain)"	3:15
8.	"Pamtiću te (I'll Remember You)"	3:19
Total length:		29:53
