= Dijamanti... =

Studio album by Halid Bešlić
- Released: 1984
- Genre: Folk
- Label: Diskoton
- Producer: Tahir Durkalić

Halid Bešlić chronology
Pjesma samo o njoj (1982)	Dijamanti... (1984)	Zbogom noći, zbogom zore (1985)

Dijamanti... (English translation: Diamonds...) is the third studio album of Bosnian singer Halid Bešlić. It was released in 1984.

== Track listing ==
1. Neću, neću dijamante (I don't want, I don't want Diamonds)
2. Snjegovi hladni dolaze (Cold snow is coming)
3. Budi, budi uvijek srećna (Always, always be happy)
4. Tri ruže (Three roses)
5. Sjećam se (I remember)
6. Zagrli me nježno (Hug me gently)
7. Gitara u noći (Guitars in the night)
8. Što je tužna breza ta (Why is that birch sad?)
