= Dragan Čović =

Bosnian Croat politician (born 1956)

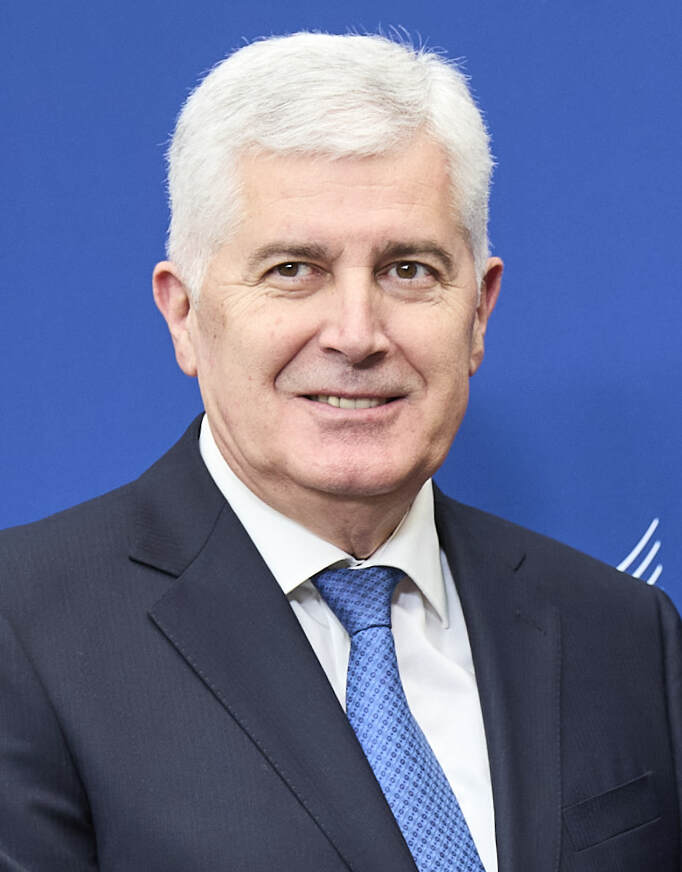
- Čović in 2026

Croat member of the Presidency of Bosnia and Herzegovina
- In office 17 November 2014 – 20 November 2018 (Note: Serving as the Chairman of the Presidency from 17 July 2015 to 17 March 2016, and from 17 July 2017 to 17 March 2018.)
- Prime Minister: Vjekoslav Bevanda; Denis Zvizdić
- Preceded by: Željko Komšić
- Succeeded by: Željko Komšić
- In office 28 October 2002 – 9 May 2005 (Note: Serving as the Chairman of the Presidency from 2 April 2003 to 10 April 2003, and from 27 June 2003 to 28 February 2004.)
- Prime Minister: Dragan Mikerević; Adnan Terzić
- Preceded by: Jozo Križanović
- Succeeded by: Ivo Miro Jović

Member of the House of Peoples
- Incumbent
- Assumed office 28 February 2019
- In office 9 June 2011 – 17 November 2014

President of the Croatian Democratic Union
- Incumbent
- Assumed office 5 June 2005
- Preceded by: Bariša Čolak
Ministerial offices
Federal Minister of Finance
In office 12 December 1998 – 12 March 2001
Prime Minister	Edhem Bičakčić
Preceded by	Office established
Succeeded by	Nikola Grabovac
Additional positions
Prime Minister of the Federation of Bosnia and Herzegovina
Acting
In office 10 January 2001 – 12 March 2001
President	Ivo Andrić-Lužanski; Karlo Filipović
Preceded by	Edhem Bičakčić
Succeeded by	Alija Behmen

Personal details
- Born: 20 August 1956 (age 70) Mostar, PR Bosnia and Herzegovina, FPR Yugoslavia
- Party: Croatian Democratic Union (1994–present)
- Other political affiliations: League of Communists (before 1992)
- Spouse: Bernardica Prskalo
- Children: 2
- Education: University of Mostar (BE, ME, PhD)
- Awards: Order of the Croatian Trefoil (1997)

Dragan Čović (Croatian pronunciation: [drǎgan t͡ʃǒːʋit͡ɕ]; born 20 August 1956) is a Bosnian Croat politician who served as the Croat member of the Presidency of Bosnia and Herzegovina from 2002 to 2005 and from 2014 to 2018. He is currently serving as a member of the national House of Peoples, and has been the president of the Croatian Democratic Union of Bosnia and Herzegovina (HDZ BiH) since 2005. During his first term in the Presidency, Čović was removed from office in 2005 by High Representative Paddy Ashdown for abuse of power and position. He has also held the role of Federal Minister of Finance from 1998 to 2001, and was the acting Federal Prime Minister from January to March 2001.

Born in Mostar, Čović graduated from the Faculty of Engineering at University Džemal Bijedić and holds a PhD from the University of Mostar. He worked as a manager at Yugoslav aircraft manufacturer SOKO and was a member of the League of Communists. He joined the HDZ BiH during the Bosnian War in 1994. As the party’s leader, Čović has played a key role in constitutional reform negotiations, including the Prud Agreement, and the 2010–2012 government formation.

Čović has faced multiple legal challenges, including convictions and subsequent acquittals related to abuse of power and misuse of public funds. Public opinion about Čović is divided: he is seen by many Bosnian Croats as a strong advocate for their political rights, while critics accuse him of corruption, nepotism, and obstructing political reform.

== Education and managerial career ==
Čović attended elementary school and the technical high school of mechanical engineering in Mostar until 1975. He graduated with a Bachelor of Engineering at the University Džemal Bijedić of Mostar in 1979.

In 1980, he joined the aircraft manufacturer SOKO in Mostar, where he worked in the technology and control sections. From 1986 to 1992, Čović was a manager at SOKO, including as director of business unit, director of production and vice president for industrialisation. From 1992 to 1998, he served as director-general of SOKO.

Čović earned a master's degree in 1989 at the Faculty of Engineering in Mostar, and from 1989 to 1991 he studied management at the Faculty of Economy at the University of Sarajevo. He obtained a PhD from the University of Mostar in 1996.

From 1994 to 1996, he taught Economics and Organisation of Production as a senior assistant at the Faculty of Engineering in Mostar, after which he was named assistant professor and taught Development of Production Systems. Four years later, Čović became an associate professor, and in 2004 he was promoted to full professor at the University of Mostar. He worked at the Faculty of Economics in Mostar, and also in regular and postgraduate studies. In 2007, he became a visiting professor at the University of Mostar's Faculty of Philosophy, and in 2014 member of the Croatian Academy of Sciences and Arts of Bosnia and Herzegovina.

== Early political career ==
In 1994, Čović joined the Croatian Democratic Union (HDZ BiH). Two years later, he became a member of the HDZ BiH's cantonal committee. In 1997, he became president of the HDZ BiH city committee in Mostar.

In 1998, Čović became vice president of the HDZ BiH, while in 2002, he became a member of the party's presidency. In 2005, he was elected president of the HDZ BiH. From 1998 to 2001, Čović served as the Federal Minister of Finance. From 10 January 2001 to 12 March 2001, he served as Acting Prime Minister of the Federation of Bosnia and Herzegovina, succeeding the Party of Democratic Action's Edhem Bičakčić. Čović served as Acting Prime Minister for two months before he himself was succeeded by Alija Behmen of the Social Democratic Party.

== First presidency (2002–2005) ==
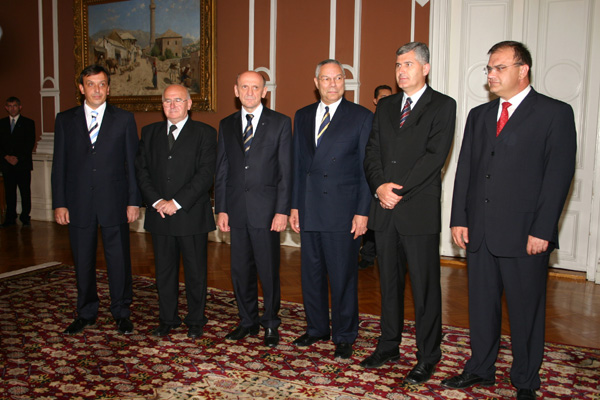
Čović and other Bosnian officials with U.S. Secretary of State Colin Powell, 31 July 2004

In the 2002 general election, Čović was elected member of the Presidency of Bosnia and Herzegovina with 114,606 votes. He served as Presidency member until 9 May 2005, when he was removed from office by the High Representative for Bosnia and Herzegovina, Paddy Ashdown, for abuse of power and position.

== Post-presidency (2005–2014) ==
Since 2005, Čović has been president of the Croatian Democratic Union (HDZ BiH).

In May 2011, he became a member of the national House of Peoples, and in February 2012, he was named its Chairman. Čović would chair the House once more in 2014. In 2011, he was also appointed President of the Croatian National Assembly.

During the numerous failed negotiations to implement the 2009 ECtHR Sejdić-Finci ruling, Čović has been singled out by analysts as blocking a solution, maintaining that Bosnian Croats must be able to elect their own member in the Presidency.

=== Prud Agreement ===
Together with the leaders of the three most important 'nationalist' political parties in Bosnia and Herzegovina, who acted as representatives of the constituent peoples, Milorad Dodik of the Alliance of Independent Social Democrats (SNSD) and Sulejman Tihić of the Party of Democratic Action, Čović created the Prud Agreement or Prud Process, an agreement that pertained to state property, census, constitutional changes, reconstructing the Council of Ministers of Bosnia and Herzegovina and solving the legal status of Brčko District. The agreement was created in the village of Prud on 8 November 2008. The reforms promised by the agreement would "build the ability of the State to meet the requirements of the EU integration process".

At a subsequent meeting in Banja Luka on 26 January 2009, the party leaders set out a plan for Bosnia and Herzegovina as a decentralised country with three levels of government. The middle level of government was anticipated to comprise four territorial units with legislative, executive, and judicial branches of government.

Controversy surrounded the creation of a third entity, Republika Srpska’s territorial integrity, and the division of Bosnia and Herzegovina. A further meeting was held in Mostar on 23 February 2009, hosted by Čović.

Despite monthly meetings of party leaders, the Prud Agreement did not lead to a compromise on territorial reorganisation, as Tihić and Čović saw the talks as a way to abolish the entities with four non-ethnic regions, while Dodik aimed to entrench Republika Srpska's right to secede after a three-year period. Dodik also began to further challenge the Office of the High Representative and to call for the repatriation of competences to the entities, relying on growing Russian support. On 20 July 2009, High Representative Valentin Inzko suggested that the process between the three 'nationalist' parties had effectively ended. Instead, it had changed into a process involving many more political parties. Inzko believed that minor-level constitutional reform could be delivered through the meetings.

The only concrete result, upon U.S. pressure, was the agreement to amend the Bosnian Constitution to incorporate Brčko District under the jurisdiction of the state institution and of the Constitutional Court, as had been settled by the Brčko arbitration process. When the Prud process failed, Milorad Dodik and the SNSD became Čović's and the HDZ BiH's close partners.

=== 2010–2012 government formation ===
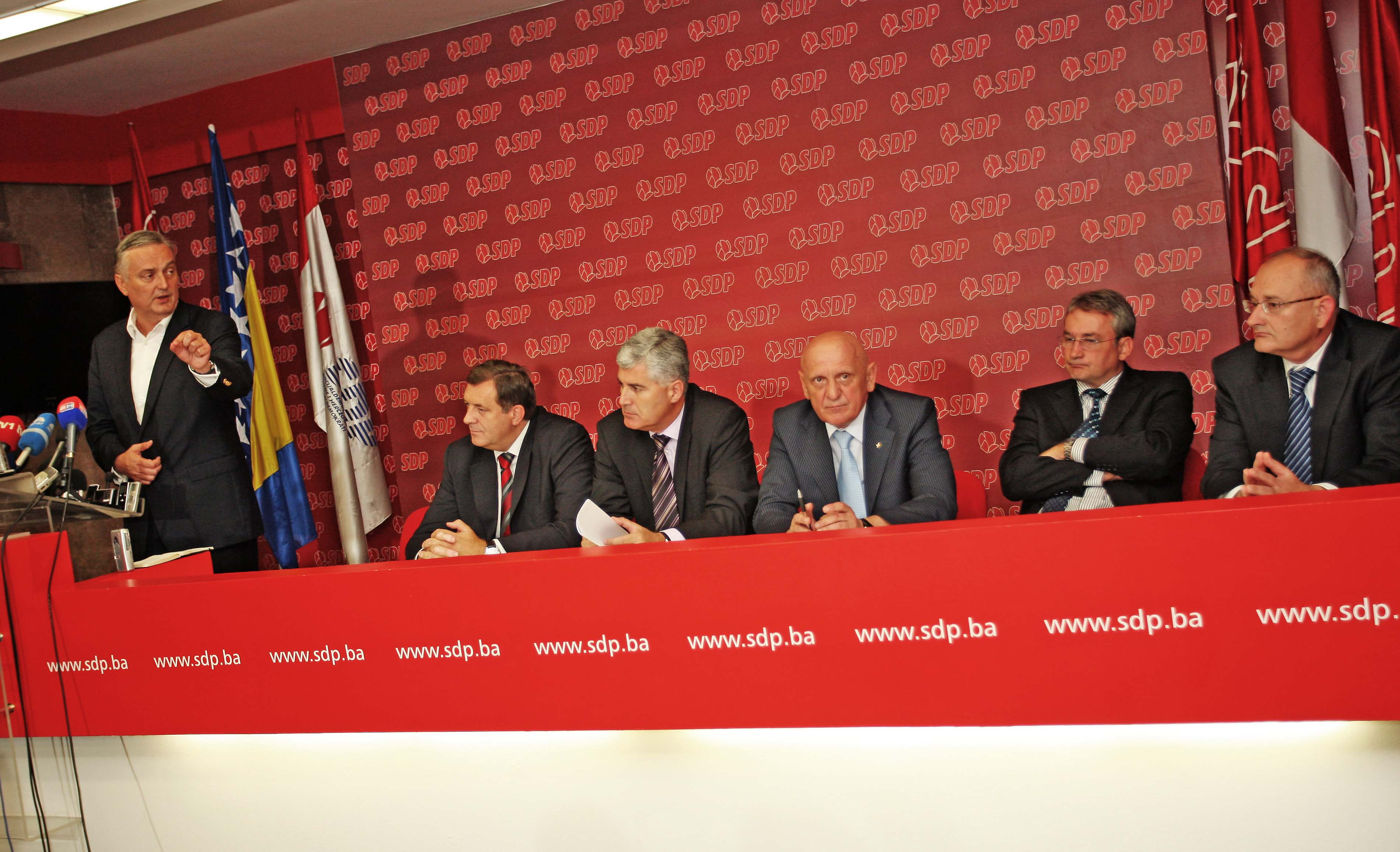
Čović alongside other Bosnian political leaders during government formation talks, 15 September 2011

Following the 2010 general election, a process of formation of Bosnia and Herzegovina's Council of Ministers (i.e. the national government) began. The resulting election produced a fragmented political landscape without a parliamentary majority coalition more than a year later. The centre-left Social Democratic Party (SDP BiH), and the Bosnian Serb autonomist SNSD, each had 8 MPs of the total 42 MPs of the House of Representatives.

The major Croat (HDZ BiH and HDZ 1990) and Serb parties (SNSD and SDS) contended that a gentlemen's agreement existed in which the chairmanship of the Council of Ministers rotates between the three constitutional nationalities. In this case, it would be a Croat politician's turn to chair the Council. As the Croatian Democratic Union (HDZ BiH), led by Čović, and the Croatian Democratic Union 1990 (HDZ 1990) received the overwhelming share of Croat votes in the 2010 general election, the parties demanded that a member of one of them be appointed Chairman. The SDP BiH, on the other hand, claimed that the only necessity is the ethnicity of the individual, and not the party, demanding the right to appoint a Croat Chairman from SDP BiH ranks, calling upon the right of having assumed most votes nationwide.

The European Union and the Office of the High Representative repeatedly attempted negotiations to appease the Bosniak–Bosnian and Serb–Croat divided political blocs, in parallel to the Bosnian constitutional crisis, all ending in failure. The Bosniak-Bosnian coalition insisted that the seat would have to go to them as the party that received the largest number of votes, while the Serb–Croat alliance insisted that due to the fact that according to tradition, the next Chairman of the Council of Ministers must be an ethnic Croat, it must come from an authentic Croat party (Croatian Democratic Union), and not the multi-ethnic SDP BiH.

A round of talks between party leaders was held in Mostar on 5 September 2011, hosted by Croat politicians Božo Ljubić and Čović, with Milorad Dodik, Mladen Bosić, Sulejman Tihić and Zlatko Lagumdžija in attendance. The parties agreed to a further round of discussion in mid-September. A meeting between the six major party leaders was held in Sarajevo on 15 September, hosted by Zlatko Lagumdžija. Topics discussed at the meeting included holding a national census, military assets and the Sejdić-Finci ruling. On the same day, an EU spokesperson warned that the country risked losing funding through the Instrument for Pre-Accession Assistance if the political situation did not stabilise. Another meeting on 26 September 2011 failed as well.

An agreement was finally reached on 28 December 2011 between the six political parties: the Social Democratic Party, the Party of Democratic Action (SDA), the Croatian Democratic Union, the Croatian Democratic Union 1990, the Serb Democratic Party and the Alliance of Independent Social Democrats. Vjekoslav Bevanda, a Bosnian Croat, became the new Chairman of the Council of Ministers.

=== Constitutional reform ===
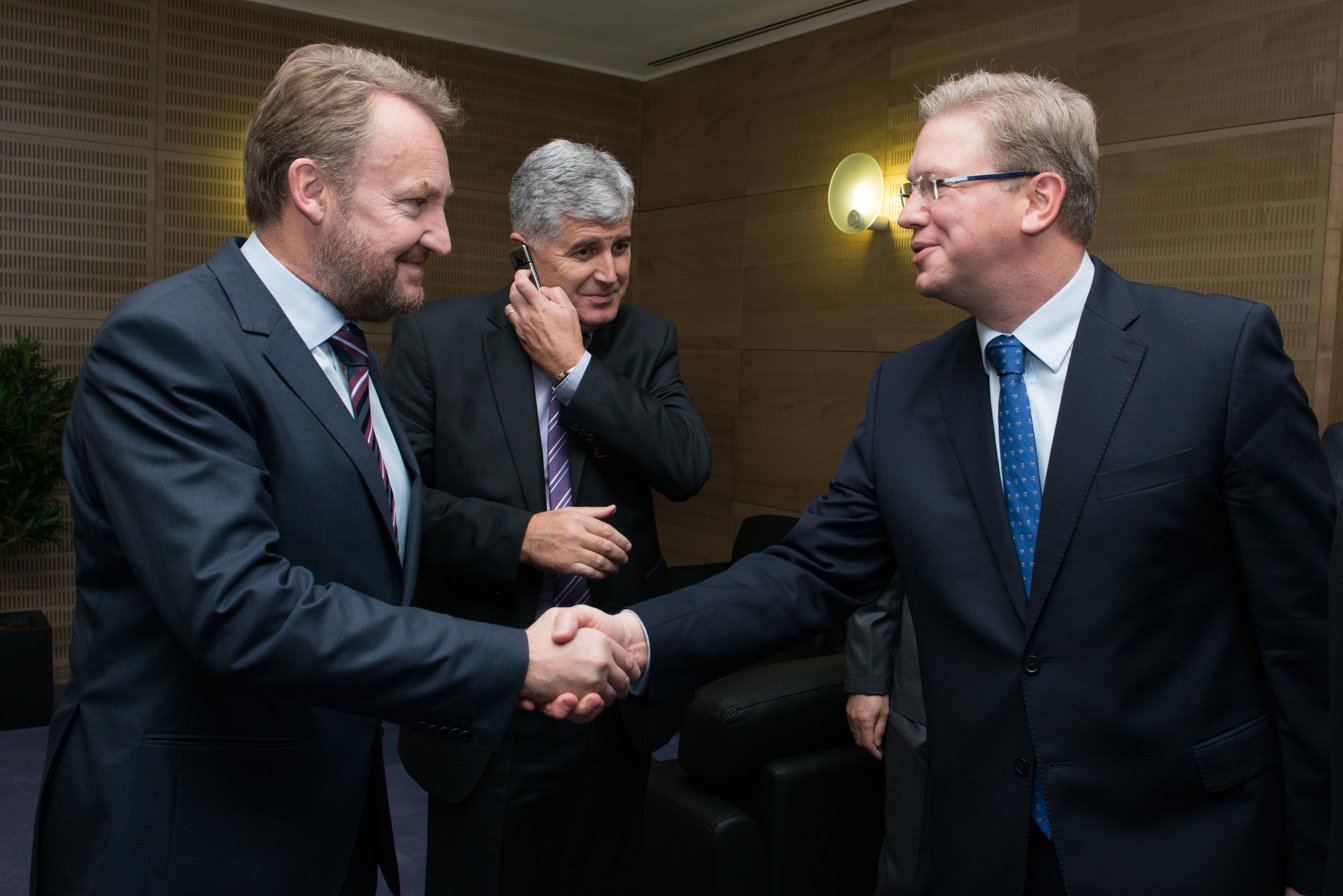
Čović with Bakir Izetbegović (left) and European Commissioner for Enlargement Štefan Füle, 10 October 2013

As “credible efforts” towards the implementation of the Sejdić–Finci ruling remained the outstanding condition for the entry into force of the Stabilisation and Association Agreement, in June 2012, Czech Commissioner Štefan Füle launched a High Level Dialogue on the Accession Process (HLAD) with Bosnia and Herzegovina, tackling both the Sejdić–Finci issue and the need for a coordination mechanism for the country to speak with a single voice in the accession process. Talks were held in June and November 2012, with little success.

In the summer of 2012, Čović and SDP BiH leader Lagumdžija agreed on the indirect election of the Bosnian Presidency members by the Bosnian Parliament, but the deal was not turned into detailed amendments. The HDZ BiH kept calling for electoral reform to prevent new Komšić cases. The same Željko Komšić left the SDP BiH, in dissent with the agreement which would have excluded him from acceding to power again. The SDA also opposed it, as it would have created a further asymmetry, with one Presidency member (from Republika Srpska) elected directly, and two elected indirectly.

In February 2013, the European Commission decided to step up its involvement, with Füle directly facilitating talks in coordination with the Council of Europe's Secretary-General Thorbjørn Jagland. In March and April 2013, with the support of the Director-General for Enlargement Stefano Sannino, the EU Delegation in Sarajevo facilitated a series of direct talks between party leaders, with no concrete outcome.

During the summer of 2013, Čović and Bosnian Presidency member Bakir Izetbegović reached a political agreement on several files, from Mostar to Sejdić–Finci, in parallel to the initiative led by the U.S. Embassy for a constitutional reform of the Federal entity. An agreement on principles for resolving the Sejdić–Finci issue was signed by political leaders in Brussels on 1 October 2013, but it evaporated shortly thereafter. Three further rounds of negotiations among political leaders were led together with Štefan Füle, in a castle near Prague in November 2013, and later in Sarajevo in the first months of 2014, also with the presence of the U.S. and the Venice Commission. Despite high hopes, a solution could not be found, as the HDZ BiH required the absolute arithmetical certainty of being able to occupy the third seat of the Bosnian Presidency, which, given that the Sejdić–Finci ruling was actually about removing ethnic discrimination in the access to the same Presidency, could not be provided by any possible model. Talks were ended on 17 February 2014, while popular protests were ongoing in Sarajevo and in the rest of the country.

== Second presidency (2014–2018) ==
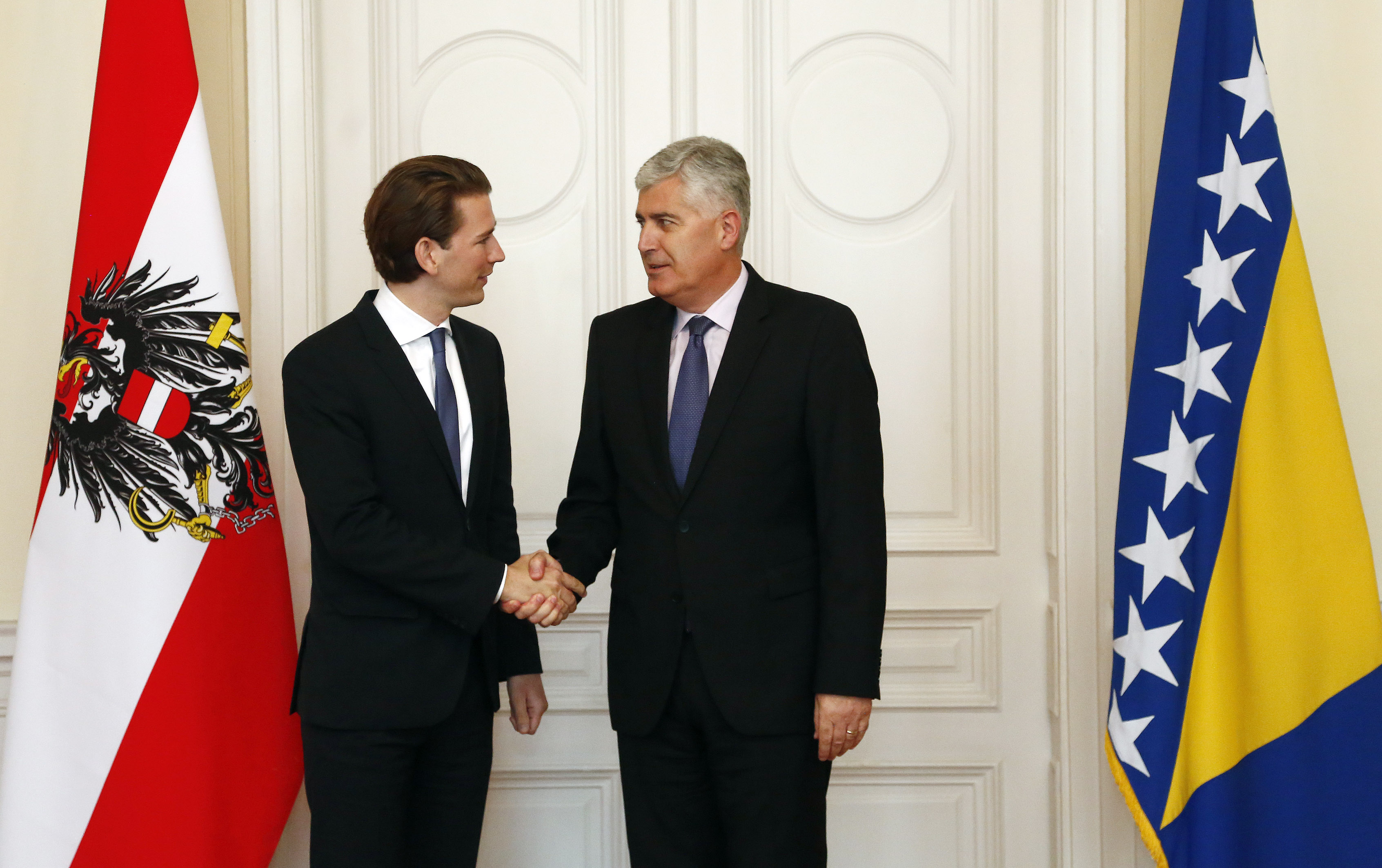
Čović greeting Austrian Foreign Minister Sebastian Kurz, 18 June 2015

In the 2014 general election, Čović was re-elected as Croat member of the Presidency of Bosnia and Herzegovina. He chaired the Presidency between November 2015 and March 2016, during which period on 15 February 2016, Bosnia and Herzegovina submitted its EU membership application. Čović held the chair of the Presidency again in the July–November 2017 period.

On 7 June 2015, he met with Pope Francis in Sarajevo, as part of the Popes's 2015 papal visit to Bosnia and Herzegovina.

In the 2018 general election, Čović lost his bid for re-election as a Croat member of the Bosnian Presidency to Željko Komšić (former member of the Presidency from 2006 until 2014). He and the HDZ BiH accused Komšić of garnering support from Bosniak rather than Croat voters and thus not being a legitimate representative of Bosnian Croats in the country's Presidency.

== Investigations and indictments ==
In November 2006, Čović was sentenced to five years in prison for exempting the Ivanković-Lijanović company from paying taxes on meat imports. The Court of Bosnia and Herzegovina, on appeal, annulled the sentence and acquitted him for lack of jurisdiction.

In 2009, Čović was accused of spending public funds to buy private homes for certain people. In April 2010, he was acquitted.

On 14 May 2010, a third indictment for Čović and six other persons was confirmed by the Court of the Herzegovina-Neretva Canton, this time for abuse of power and position. He and other committee members of the Croatian Post and Telecom (HPT) were accused of transferring a debt of nearly 4,7 million convertible marks from the non-existing Ministry of Defence of the Croatian Defence Council to three private companies. By receiving the debt, those three companies became owners of shares in HT Eronet, the most profitable telecommunication section of the HPT. At the time, Čović was Federal Minister of Finance and president of the Steering Committee of the HPT. The HNC Court asked that this case be brought before the Court of Bosnia and Herzegovina, but the Federal Supreme Court ruled that it had to be tried in Mostar. In May 2012, Čović was acquitted.

In March 2021, Čović was sanctioned by the Conflict of Interest Commission of Bosnia and Herzegovina with a reduction of 10% of his parliamentary salary for violation of the Law on Conflict of Interest, as in 2017 he received double compensation, both as a member of the national House of Peoples and of the Croatian National Assembly.

== Personal life ==
Čović is married to retired attorney Bernardica Prskalo and together they have two daughters, Sanja and Danijela.

On 19 July 2020, it was confirmed that he tested positive for COVID-19, amid its pandemic in Bosnia and Herzegovina; by 4 August, he had recovered.

== Notes ==
Party political offices
Preceded by Bariša Čolak	President of the Croatian Democratic Union; 2005–present	Incumbent
Political offices
Preceded by Edhem Bičakčić	Prime Minister of the Federation of Bosnia and Herzegovina (Acting); 2001	Succeeded by Alija Behmen
Preceded by Jozo Križanović	Croat member of the Presidency of Bosnia and Herzegovina; 2002–2005	Succeeded by Ivo Miro Jović
Preceded by Mirko Šarović	Chairman of the Presidency of Bosnia and Herzegovina; Acting; 2003	Succeeded by Borislav Paravac
Preceded by Borislav Paravac	Chairman of the Presidency of Bosnia and Herzegovina; 2003–2004	Succeeded by Sulejman Tihić
Preceded by Željko Komšić	Croat member of the Presidency of Bosnia and Herzegovina; 2014–2018	Succeeded by Željko Komšić
Preceded by Mladen Ivanić	Chairman of the Presidency of Bosnia and Herzegovina; 2015–2016	Succeeded by Bakir Izetbegović
Preceded by Mladen Ivanić	Chairman of the Presidency of Bosnia and Herzegovina; 2017–2018	Succeeded by Bakir Izetbegović
