= Prud Agreement =

The Prud Agreement or Prud Process was an agreement that pertained to state property, census, constitutional changes, reconstructing the Council of Ministers of Bosnia and Herzegovina and solving the legal status of Brčko District. It was created by the leaders of the three most important 'nationalist' political parties in Bosnia and Herzegovina, Sulejman Tihić (SDA), Dragan Čović (HDZ BiH) and Milorad Dodik (SNSD) in the village of Prud on 8 November 2008.

In relation to constitutional reform discussions in Prud and subsequent talks cover four key areas: Harmonisation of Bosnia's constitution with the European Convention on Human Rights; State level competences; Functional common institutions; Territorial organisation, specifically of the middle level of government.

The reforms promised by the agreement would "build the ability of the State to meet the requirements of the EU integration process".

At a subsequent meeting in Banja Luka on 26 January 2009, the party leaders set out a plan for Bosnia and Herzegovina as a decentralized country with three levels of government. The middle level of government was anticipated to be made up by four territorial units with legislative, executive and judicial branches of government.

Controversy surrounded the creation of a third entity, Republika Srpska’s territorial integrity, and the division of Bosnia and Herzegovina. In an article rejecting the suggestion that the division of Bosnia's middle level of government into four entities would remove Republika Srpska from the map, the SNSD gave a clear statement:

Republika Srpska is a constitutional-territorial category which is not up for discussion and around which there is no bargaining

A further meeting was held in Mostar on 23 February 2009, hosted by Čović.

On 20 July 2009, the High Representative for Bosnia and Herzegovina, Valentin Inzko suggested that the process between the three 'nationalist' parties had effectively ended. Instead it had changed into a process involving many more political parties. Inzko believed that minor level constitutional reform can be delivered through the meetings.
