= Mostovi tuge =

Studio album by Halid Bešlić
- Released: 24 November 1988
- Genre: Folk
- Label: Jugoton

Halid Bešlić chronology
Hala Pionir Beograd (uživo) (1988)	Mostovi tuge (1988)	Opet sam se zaljubio (1990)

Mostovi tuge (English translation: Bridges of Sorrow) is the eighth studio album of Bosnian singer Halid Bešlić. It was released in 1988.

== Track listing ==
1. Mostovi tuge (Bridges of Sorrow)
2. Daleko je sreća (Happiness is Far Away)
3. Ljubav je stvorila anđela (Love Created an Angel)
4. Zumbuli su procvali (The Hycaniths Have Blossomed)
5. Ona i samo ona (Her and Only Her)
6. Zaljubljen sam, stara majko (I'm In Love, Old Mother)
7. Na zapadu ništa novo (Nothing New in the West)
8. Dosta mi je tužne muzike (I Am Sick of Sad Music)

Recorded from 1985

1. I zanesen tom ljepotom (And fascinated by that beauty)
2. Zlatne strune (Golden strings)
