= 2010–2012 Bosnia and Herzegovina government formation =

Following the general election on 3 October 2010, a process of formation of Bosnia and Herzegovina's Council of Ministers had begun. The resulting election produced a fragmented political landscape without a coalition of a parliamentary majority more than a year after the election. The centre-left Social Democratic Party, the largest party in the Federation of Bosnia and Herzegovina, and the Bosnian Serb autonomist Alliance of Independent Social Democrats, the largest party in Republika Srpska, each had 8 MPs of the total 42 MPs of the House of Representatives (28 from the Federation and 14 from Republika Srpska). Similarly, a crisis of government was also present at the local levels, as well as the Federal entity.

In late 2011, the Council of Ministers (i.e. the national government) had been solved, however the country remained in a situation of perpetual political crisis, especially the Federation of Bosnia and Herzegovina.

After months of dysfunction and arguments about legality, the entity's short-lived Federal Government had collapsed in February 2013.

== Background ==
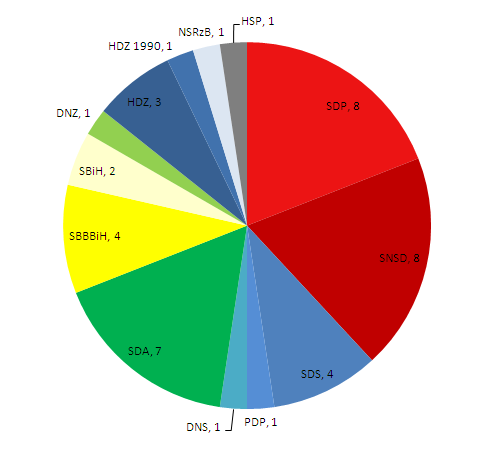
House of Representatives seats by party

=== Sejdić and Finci v. Bosnia and Herzegovina ===
In 2009, the European Court of Human Rights ruled that the ineligibility of minorities other than the country's three constitutional peoples to run for the House of Peoples or the Presidency was discriminatory. The parties failed to agree on how to change the electoral system.

=== National census ===
Bosnia and Herzegovina has held one official national census since 1991 while still a part of the Socialist Federal Republic of Yugoslavia, and prior to the Bosnian War. That census was held in 2013, but the results weren't published for a long period of time due to debates regarding how to classify the ethnic groups. Holding a census was a condition for the country's European Union membership.

== Local crisis ==
The Federation of Bosnia and Herzegovina had a similar crisis due to the fact that the Bosniak-majority coalition had unilaterally formed a government without the necessary support of Croat representatives. Among the parliamentary Serb and Bosniak Clubs as well, at least one third of the votes in the 17-member Croat Club in the Federal Parliament's upper house is necessary to elect the President of the Federation (and his deputies) in order to pass a motion of confidence and form a cabinet. This provision is supposed to ensure Croats, Serbs and others with checks on government, as Bosniaks form 70% of the Federation's population. Despite receiving only 5 votes in the Croat Club, the Social Democratic Party (SDP BiH) elected the President and formed the government. After the Central Electoral Commission issued a ruling in March 2011, declaring the election of the Federal President (and his deputies) as well as the government formation illegal, the High Representative Valentin Inzko suspended CEC's two rulings. He thus allowed the SDP BiH to form a government in the Federation without Croat representatives, taking the Croatian Party of Rights, a minor Croat party, as its coalition partner. The Croats held protests and Croat politicians rejected the unconstitutional and illegitimate authorities of the Federation of Bosnia and Herzegovina. "5≠17÷3" became the motto of many Croat protests.

== Issues ==
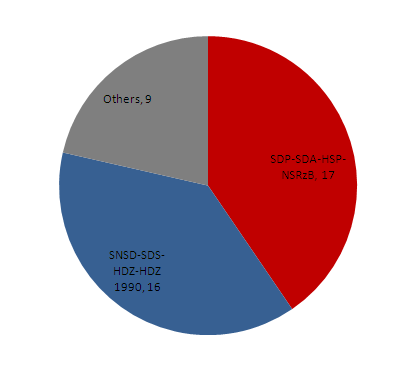
Coalition groups in the House of Representatives

=== Chairman of the Council of Ministers ===
The major Croat (HDZ BiH and HDZ 1990) and Serb parties (SNSD and SDS) contended that a gentlemen's agreement existed in which the chairmanship of the Council of Ministers rotates between the three constitutional nationalities. In this case, it would be the turn for a Croat politician to chair the Council. As the Croatian Democratic Union (HDZ BiH) and the Croatian Democratic Union 1990 (HDZ 1990) received the overwhelming share of Croat votes in the 2010 general election, the parties demanded that a member of one of them receive the position of Chairman. The SDP BiH on the other hand, claimed that the only necessity is the ethnicity of the individual, and not the party, demanding the right to appoint a Croat Chairman from the SDP BiH ranks, calling upon the right of having assumed most votes nationwide.

=== EU funding ===
The Council of Ministers of Bosnia and Herzegovina had to agree as to how funds available through the EU's Instrument for Pre-Accession Assistance would be divided between the national government, the Federation and Republika Srpska.

== Government formation talks ==
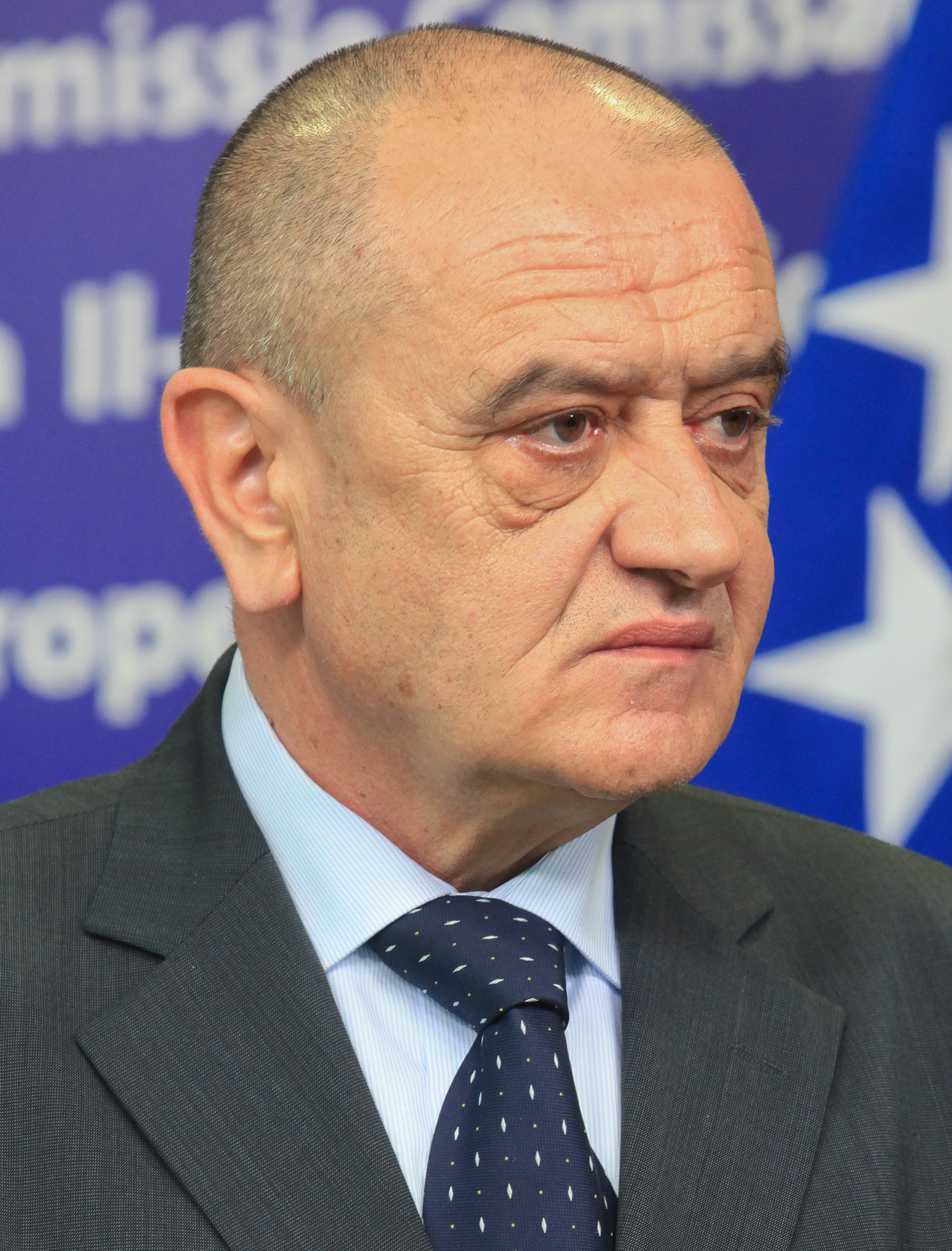
Vjekoslav Bevanda, a Bosnian Croat, became the new Chairman of the Council of Ministers

The European Union and the Office of the High Representative (OHR) repeatedly attempted negotiations to appease the Bosniak–Bosnian and Serb–Croat divided political blocs, in parallel to the Bosnian constitutional crisis, all ending in failure. The peaks of the crisis were the moves of the Serb entity to schedule a referendum against the OHR, which were left later on. The Bosniak-Bosnian coalition insisted that the seat would have to go to them as the party that received the largest number of votes, while the Serb–Croat alliance insisted that due to the fact that according to tradition, the next Chairman of the Council of Ministers must be an ethnic Croat, it must come from an authentic Croat party (Croatian Democratic Union), and not the multi-ethnic SDP BiH.

Slavo Kukić, a Croat member of the SDP BiH, was nominated for Chairman in July by the country's Presidency. Croat and Serb parties subsequently voted against the nomination. Although he received a majority of votes in the House of Representatives, he failed to receive the necessary 2/3 majority of votes from Republika Srpska representatives.

On 1 September 2011, Danish diplomat Peter Sørensen was appointed European Union Special Representative, replacing Valentin Inzko.

A round of talks between party leaders was held in Mostar on 5 September, hosted by Croat politicians Božo Ljubić and Dragan Čović, with Milorad Dodik, Mladen Bosić, Sulejman Tihić and Zlatko Lagumdžija in attendance. The parties agreed to a further round of discussion in mid-September.

A meeting between the six major party leaders was held in Sarajevo on 15 September, hosted by Zlatko Lagumdžija. Topics discussed at the meeting included holding a national census, military assets and the Sejdić-Finci ruling. On the same day, an EU spokesperson warned that the country risked losing funding through the Instrument for Pre-Accession Assistance if the political situation did not stabilize. Another meeting on 26 September 2011 failed as well.

An agreement was finally reached on 28 December 2011 between the six political parties: the Social Democratic Party, the Party of Democratic Action, the Croatian Democratic Union, the Croatian Democratic Union 1990, the Serb Democratic Party and the Alliance of Independent Social Democrats. Vjekoslav Bevanda, a Bosnian Croat, became the new Chairman of the Council of Ministers.
