= Zajedno smo jači =

Studio album by Halid Bešlić
- Released: 1986
- Genre: Folk
- Label: Diskos

Halid Bešlić chronology
Otrov (1986)	Zajedno smo jači (1986)	Eh, kad bi ti rekla mi, volim te (1987)

Zajedno smo jači (English translation: We Are Stronger Together) is the sixth studio album of Bosnian singer Halid Bešlić. It was released in 1986.

== Track listing ==
1. Prokleta je žena ta (That Woman is Cursed)
2. Zajedno smo jači (We Are Stronger Together)
3. Mnogi su je poljubili (Many Have Kissed Her)
4. Jabuke su bile slatke (The Apples Were Sweet)
5. Voljela me jedna Esma (A Lady Named Esma Loved Me)
6. Najlijepši dragulji (The Most Beautiful Bijoux)
7. Nekad sam ti bio drag (I Was Once Dear to You)
8. Mladost je otišla (Youth Has Gone)
