= Halid Bešlić =

Bosnian singer (1953–2025)

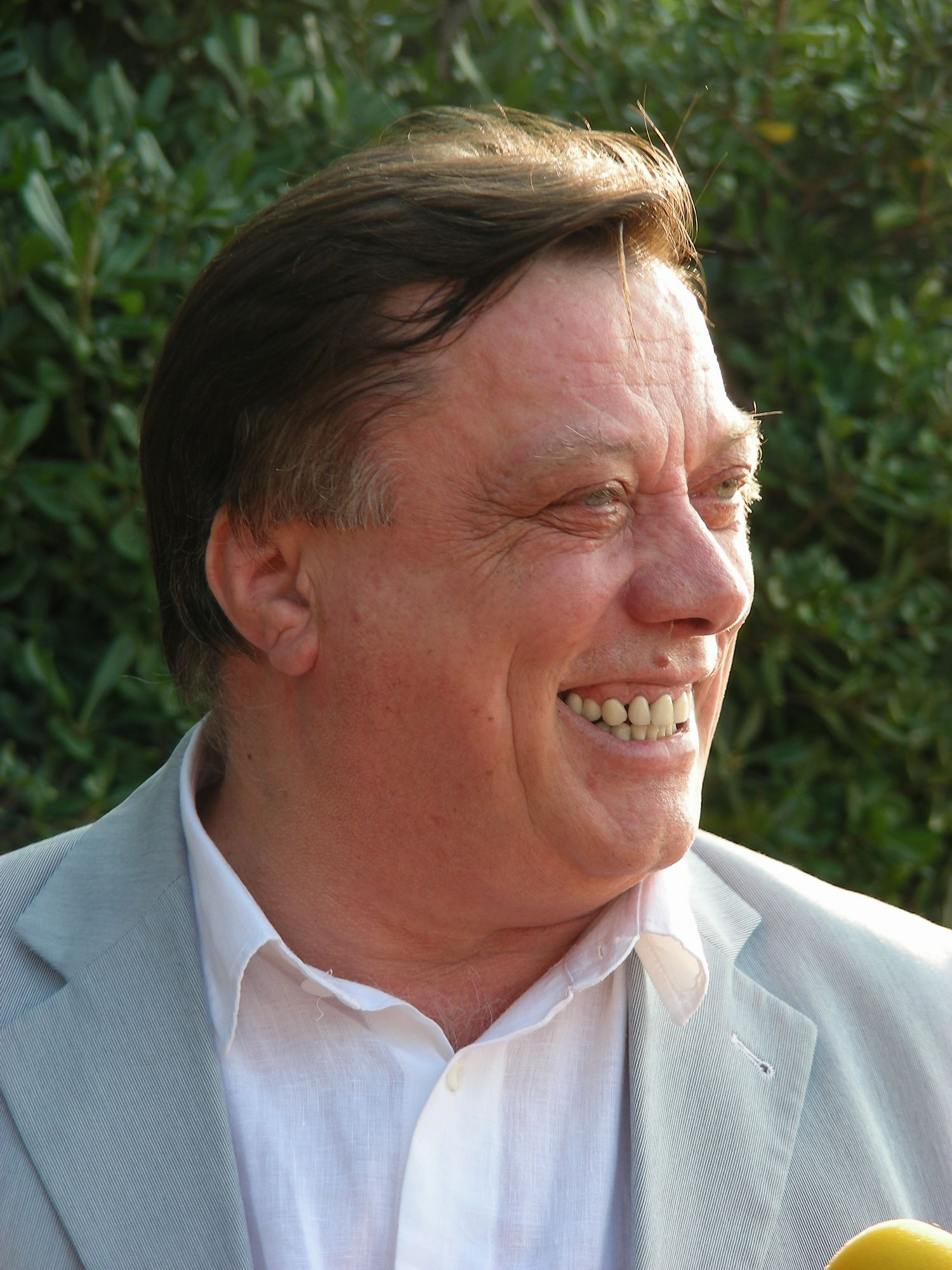
- Bešlić in 2007
- Born: 20 November 1953; Knežina, PR Bosnia and Herzegovina, FPR Yugoslavia
- Died: 7 October 2025 (aged 71); Sarajevo, Bosnia and Herzegovina
- Spouse: Sejda Bešlić (m. 1977)
- Children: 1
- Musical career
- Origin: Sarajevo
- Genres: Pop-folk, folk
- Occupations: Musician, singer
- Instrument: Vocals
- Years active: 1979–2025
- Labels: Nimfa Sound, Diskoton, Jugoton, City Records

Halid Bešlić (Bosnian pronunciation: [xǎːlid bɛ̂ʃlitɕ]; 20 November 1953 – 7 October 2025) was a Bosnian folk singer and musician whose career spanned nearly five decades. Renowned for his distinctive baritone voice and emotive delivery, he became one of the most influential and best-selling performers in the former Yugoslavia and throughout the Balkans.

Rising to prominence in the early 1980s with the albums Sijedi starac (1981), Pjesma samo o njoj (1982) and Dijamanti... (1984), Bešlić developed a devoted following across the Balkans and among the Bosnian diaspora. He released more than a dozen studio albums and performed widely across Europe and North America.

During the Bosnian War, Bešlić organized and took part in numerous humanitarian concerts for displaced persons and war victims. In 2009, he survived a serious car crash that left him with lasting injuries but continued to perform and record in the following years. Bešlić's work is regarded as an important contribution to Bosnian musical and cultural heritage, and he remained a regional cultural icon until his death in Sarajevo in 2025.

== Early life ==
Bešlić was born in Knežina, a village near Sokolac, Bosnia and Herzegovina, while it was part of the Federal People's Republic of Yugoslavia. His father Mujo Bešlić, a military man, died on 1 April 2016 at the age of 83 in a Sarajevo hospital. Halid, who was on tour in the United States at the time, managed to arrive at the funeral held in a village by Olovo, where Mujo had lived since the start of the Bosnian War in 1992.

== Career ==
After serving mandatory military service in the Yugoslav People's Army, Bešlić moved from Knežina to Sarajevo and began performing at local restaurants. After several years, his first musical releases were eight singles between 1979 and 1982, with his first studio album, entitled Sijedi starac (Grey Old Man), being released in 1981.

By 1984, he started becoming more and more well known, with popular songs such as "Neću, neću dijamante" (I Don't Want, I Don't Want Diamonds) and "Budi budi uvijek srećna" (Always, Always Be Happy) being heard all over Yugoslavia. Bešlić released eight albums during the 1980s, with hit songs including "Vraćam se majci u Bosnu" (I Am Returning to My Mother in Bosnia), "Sjećam se" (I Remember), "Hej, zoro, ne svani" (Hey, Dawn, Don't Rise) and "Eh, kad bi ti" (Oh, If Only You Would).

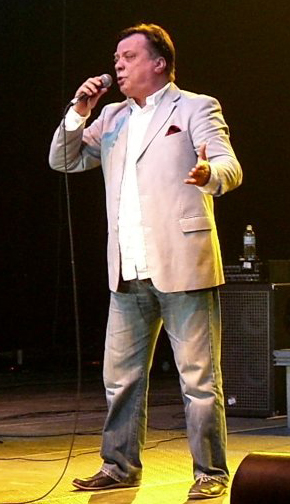
Bešlić performing at the Hershey Centre in Mississauga, Canada, May 2007

In the 1990s, during the breakup of Yugoslavia, Bosnia and Herzegovina went into war and Bešlić staged more than 500 humanitarian concerts across Europe for the victims in his home country. During his career, he recorded 18 albums and staged countless concerts.

Bešlić also had several hit songs in the 2000s and 2010s. The 2003 album Prvi poljubac (First Kiss) featured the hit song of the same name. The song "Miljacka", named after the Bosnian river, was featured on his 2007 album Halid 08 and the songs "Štiklom o kamen" (High Heels on Stone) and "Kad zaigra srce od meraka" (When the Heart Dances from Joy) were featured on Romanija (2013). The album Trebević, named after the Bosnian mountain, was released in February 2020.

On 11 September 2025, the Serbian pop band Miligram released a single featuring Bešlić, titled after his wife Sejda. The song was dedicated to her and would become Bešlić's final single, as he died less than a month later, on 7 October, after falling ill in late August.

== Personal life ==
Bešlić married his wife Sejda in November 1977. In 2015, he acquired Croatian citizenship. Eight months after Bešlić's death, his wife Sejda died on 1 June 2026.

=== 2009 car crash ===
On 10 March 2009, Bešlić left his gas station at around 4 in the morning, and ran his Škoda Superb off the road, due to icy conditions, and crashed. Bešlić, who was not wearing his seat belt, suffered serious injuries to his face and right eye, initially being in a coma. All of Bosnia and Herzegovina showed concern after his wreck, as they awaited any news regarding his condition. He would eventually make a full recovery. Attempts to save his eye were undertaken at hospitals in Bosnia, Turkey and Belgium, however they were all ultimately unsuccessful. After his recovery, Bešlić slowly made his way back onto the music scene. Notably, he held a major concert in Zagreb at the end of October 2009.

Bešlić had earlier survived a car wreck in 1986 with the singer Suzana Mančić.

=== Illness and death ===
On 21 August 2025, Bešlić was forced to cancel his concert in Gradačac due to undisclosed health reasons. He was hospitalized at the nephrology department of the Clinical Center of the University of Sarajevo the following day. In September 2025, his manager revealed that Bešlić was transferred to the oncology department and that he was "doing better and feeling well."

Bešlić died in Sarajevo on 7 October 2025, at the age of 71.

==== Reactions and tributes ====
Following Bešlić's death, many prominent politicians paid their respects, including Bosnian Presidency members Denis Bećirović, Željko Komšić and Željka Cvijanović, former Presidency members Dragan Čović and Milorad Dodik, former Serbian prime minister Ivica Dačić and former Croatian president Kolinda Grabar-Kitarović, as well as many notable regional public figures, such as singers Severina, Miroslav Ilić, Hanka Paldum, Dino Merlin, Lepa Brena, Zdravko Čolić, Ana Bekuta, Marija Šerifović, Mladen Vojičić Tifa, Sejo Sexon, Marko Perković Thompson, Šerif Konjević, Željko Samardžić and Selma Bajrami, footballers Emir Spahić and Edin Džeko, actors Enis Bešlagić and Emir Hadžihafizbegović, and many others. Petar Grašo and the band Crvena Jabuka subsequently cancelled their concerts in Sarajevo in respect to Bešlić.

Apart from regional media, foreign media also reacted to Bešlić's death, including those in the United Kingdom, Sweden, Austria, Germany, Turkey and others. Upon his death, the government of Sarajevo Canton announced that 13 October 2025, the day of his burial, would be a national day of mourning throughout the canton. The Federal government also declared a day of mourning for 13 October in the entity.

On 12 October, over 20,000 people gathered in front of the Eternal flame memorial in Sarajevo to pay tribute to Bešlić. Additionally, people in more than 150 cities, both in the region and internationally, gathered to honor him. Bešlić was buried in Sarajevo at the Bare Cemetery on 13 October. Thousands of people attended his funeral, including Presidency members Denis Bećirović and Željko Komšić, Serbian politician Čedomir Jovanović, and regional public figures such as Neda Ukraden, Ana Bekuta, Nikola Rokvić, Saša and Dejan Matić, Zorica Brunclik, Tifa, Željko Joksimović, Haris Džinović, Duško Kuliš, Meho Kodro, Faruk Hadžibegić, Dino Merlin, Selma Bajrami, Emina Jahović, Jala Brat, and many more. Merlin, Enis Bešlagić and Emir Hadžihafizbegović, among others, delivered eulogies at his memorial at the Sarajevo National Theatre prior to the funeral.

== Discography ==
Singles

- "Grešnica" (1979)
- "Sijedi starac" (1980)
- "Mirela" (1981)
- "Pjesma samo o njoj" (1982)

Studio albums

Cover of Grade moj

- Sijedi starac (1981)
- Pjesma samo o njoj (1982)
- Dijamanti... (1984)
- Zbogom noći, zbogom zore (1985)
- Otrov (1986)
- Zajedno smo jači (1986)
- Eh, kad bi ti rekla mi, volim te (1987)
- Mostovi tuge (1988)
- Opet sam se zaljubio (1990)
- Ljiljani (1991)
- Grade moj (1993)
- Ne zovi me, ne traži me (1996)
- Robinja (1998)
- U ime ljubavi (2000)
- Prvi poljubac (2003)
- Halid 08 (2007)
- Romanija (2013)
- Trebević (2020)

As featured artist

- "Ne zna juče da je sad" (with Viki Miljković, 2011)
- "Sejda" (with Miligram, 2025)

Concerts

- Hala "Pionir" Beograd (uživo) (1988)
- Koncert Skenderija (2001)
- Halid Bešlić i gosti: Zetra Live (2004)
- Halid Bešlić i Crvena Jabuka: Melbourne, Australia (2012)

== Filmography ==
Year	Title	Role
2006	The Border Post	Singer
2021	Not So Friendly Neighborhood Affair	Himself
