= Zbogom noći, zbogom zore =

Studio album by Halid Bešlić
- Released: 1985
- Genre: Folk
- Label: Diskoton
- Producer: Tahir Durkalić

Halid Bešlić chronology
Dijamanti... (1984)	Zbogom noći, zbogom zore (1985)	Otrov (1986)

Zbogom noći, zbogom zore (English translation: Farewell Nights, Farewell Mornings) is the fourth studio album of Bosnian singer Halid Bešlić. It was released in 1985.

== Track listing ==
1. Zbogom noći, zbogom zore (Farewell Nights, Farewell Dawns)
2. Hir mladosti (Luda igra) (Caprice of Youth (Crazy Game))
3. Zbog najdraže žene (Because of the Dearest Woman)
4. Ljubav je ko magla (Love is Like Fog)
5. I zanesen tom ljepotom (Enthralled by your Beauty)
6. Zlatne strune (Golden String)
7. Još ljubavi ima (There is Still Love)
8. Volim te (I Love You)
