= Pjesma samo o njoj =

Studio album by Halid Bešlić
- Released: 1982
- Genre: Folk
- Label: Diskoton
- Producer: Hasan Dudić

Halid Bešlić chronology
Sijedi starac (1981)	Pjesma samo o njoj (1982)	Dijamanti... (1984)

Pjesma samo o njoj (English translation: A Song Only About Her) is the second studio album by Bosnian singer Halid Bešlić. It was released in 1982.

== Track listing ==
1. Pjesma samo o njoj (A Song Only About Her)
2. Do ljubavi tvoje mi je stalo (Because Of Your Love, I Care)
3. Ta je žena varala me (That Woman Cheated on Me)
4. Samo s tobom lijepo mi je (Only with You It's Nice for Me)
5. Domovino, u srcu te nosimo (Home, in Our Hearts We Carry You)
6. Volim te, neka svako zna (I Love You, I Want Everyone to Know)
7. Zašto su ti oči tužne (Why Are Your Eyes Sad?)
8. Uspomeno, uspomeno (Memory, Memory)
