= Eh, kad bi ti rekla mi, volim te =

Studio album by Halid Bešlić
- Released: 1987
- Genre: Folk
- Label: Jugoton
- Producer: Tomislav Milaković

Halid Bešlić chronology
Zajedno smo jači (1986)	Eh, kad bi ti rekla mi, volim te (1987)	Hala Pionir Beograd (uživo) (1988)

Eh, kad bi ti rekla mi, volim te (English translation: If You'd Say "I Love You" to Me) is the seventh studio album of Bosnian singer Halid Bešlić. It was released in 1987.

== Track listing ==
- All songs written by Nazif Glijva:
1. Zar si mogla ljubit' njega (How Could You Kiss Him?)
2. Eh, kad bi ti (If Only You Would)
3. Hej, zoro, ne svani (Hey, Morning, Don't Rise)
4. Gitara i čaša vina (A Guitar and a Glass of Wine)
5. U plamenu jedne vatre (In the Flame of One Fire)
6. Srebrni mjesec (Silver Moon)
7. Vremena se mijenjaju (Times Are Changing)
8. Ne diraj mi nju (Don't Touch Her)
