= List of chairpersons of the Party of Democratic Action =

Most senior politician of the Party of Democratic Action

President of the Party of Democratic Action
- Predsjednik Stranke demokratske akcije
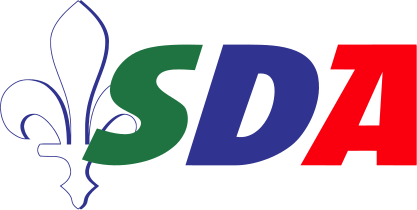

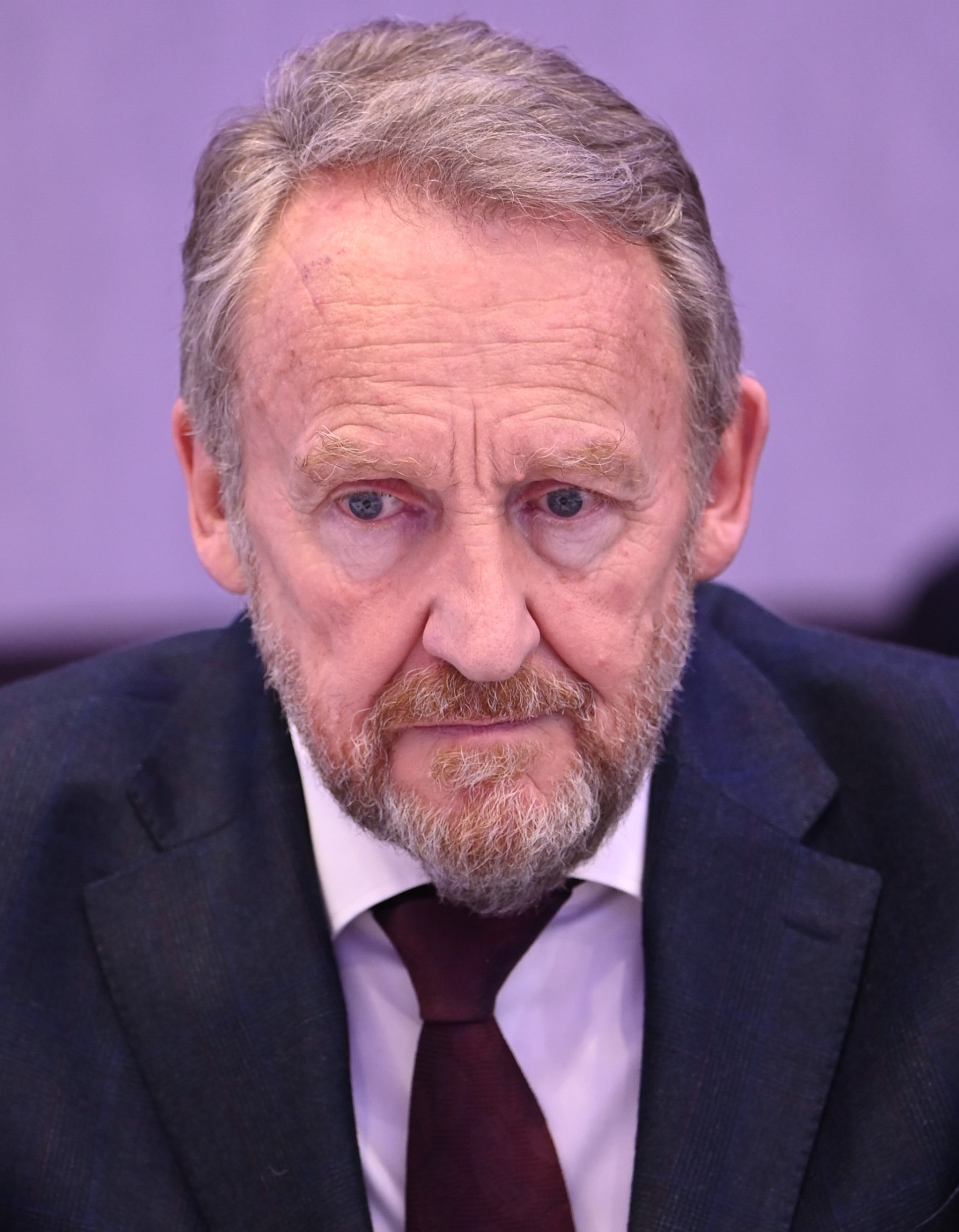
- Incumbent; Bakir Izetbegović since 25 September 2014
- Term length: Four years, renewable
- Formation: 26 May 1990
- First holder: Alija Izetbegović
- Salary: None
- Website: sda.ba

This article lists the chairpersons of the Party of Democratic Action.

The president of the Party of Democratic Action is the most senior political figure within the party. Since 25 September 2014, the office has been held by Bakir Izetbegović, following the death of Sulejman Tihić.

== List of officeholders ==
Portrait	Name (Born–Died)	Term of office			Notes	Ref.
Portrait	Name (Born–Died)	Took office	Left office	Days	Notes	Ref.
1	Alija Izetbegović (1925–2003)	26 May 1990	13 October 2001	11 years, 140 days		
2	Sulejman Tihić (1951–2014)	13 October 2001	25 September 2014	12 years, 347 days	Died in office.	
3	Bakir Izetbegović (born 1956)	25 September 2014	Incumbent	12 years, 17 days		
