= Opet sam se zaljubio =

Studio album by Halid Bešlić
- Released: 1990
- Genre: Folk
- Label: Diskoton

Halid Bešlić chronology
Mostovi tuge (1988)	Opet sam se zaljubio (1990)	Ljiljani (1991)

Opet sam se zaljubio (English translation: I Fell in Love Again) is the ninth studio album of Bosnian singer Halid Bešlić. It was released in 1990.

== Track listing ==
1. More i planine (The Sea and Mountains)
2. Sarajevo, grade moj (Sarajevo, My Town)
3. Opet sam se zaljubio (I Fell in Love Again)
4. Lete ptice, lete jata (The Birds Are Flying, the Flock is Flying)
5. Gordana
6. Zlatna čaša (Golden Cups)
7. Zlatne niti (Golden Thread)
8. Sumorne jeseni (Gloomy Autumns)
