= Robinja (album) =

1998 studio album by Halid Bešlić

Studio album by Halid Bešlić
- Released: 1998
- Genre: Folk
- Label: Nimfa Sound

Halid Bešlić chronology
Ne zovi me, ne traži me (1996)	Robinja (1998)	U ime ljubavi (2000)

Robinja (English translation: Slave) is the thirteenth studio album of Bosnian singer Halid Bešlić. It was released in 1998.

== Track listing ==
1. Svatovi (Nutpials)
2. Robinja (Slave)
3. Ranjen sam ti (I'm Wounded for You)
4. Tajna (Secret)
5. Žena mog života (Woman of my Life)
6. Jesen u meni (Autumn Inside of Me)
7. Plavuše (Blonde Woman)
8. Odlazim (I'm Leaving)
9. Željan sam željan (I'm Craving, I'm Craving)
10. Rajske ptice (Birds of Paradise)
