= Halid 08 =

Studio album by Halid Bešlić
- Released: 2008
- Genre: Folk
- Labels: Hayat Production, PGP-RTS

Halid Bešlić chronology
Prvi poljubac (2003)	Halid 08 (2008)	Romanija (2013)

Halid 08 is the sixteenth studio album of Bosnian singer Halid Bešlić. It was released in 2008.

== Track listing ==
1. Miljacka
2. Čardak
3. Ljut na tebe (Angry at You)
4. Ne traži me (Do Not Look for Me, featuring Fabrizio)
5. Snježana
6. Dvadesete (Twenties)
7. Budna si (You're Awake)
8. Nije ljubav vino (Love is Not Wine)
9. Ljubičica (Violet)
10. Ulica uzdaha (Street of Sighs, featuring Luna)

== Charts ==
=== Weekly charts ===
Chart (2008)	Peak position
Croatia (HDU)	6
Croatia International (HDU)	2

=== Year-end charts ===
Chart (2008)	Peak position
Croatia (HDU)	45
Croatia International (HDU)	10

Chart (2010)	Peak position
Croatia International (HDU)	10
