= Prvi poljubac =

2003 album by Halid Bešlić

Studio album by Halid Bešlić
- Released: 4 February 2003
- Genre: Folk
- Label: Intakt Records, Music Star Production

Halid Bešlić chronology
U ime ljubavi (2000)	Prvi poljubac (2003)	Halid 08 (2007)

Prvi poljubac (lit: First Kiss) is the fifteenth studio album of Bosnian singer Halid Bešlić. It was released on 4 February 2003.

== Track listing ==
1. "Prvi poljubac" ("First Kiss")
2. "Požuri" ("Hurry")
3. "Lijepe ciganke" ("Beautiful Gypsy Women") featuring Omar Raković
4. "Stara kuća" ("Old House")
5. "Grešnica" ("Sinner")
6. "Lijepa pa i pametna" ("Beautiful and Smart")
7. "Moja jedina" ("My One and Only")
8. "Zrele kajsije" ("Mature Apricots")
9. "Navika" ("Habit")
10. "Kao nekada ("As Before")

Bonus tracks

1. "U meni jesen je" ("It is Autumn Inside of Me")
2. "Daj da ljubim" ("Let Me Kiss")
3. "Plavo oko" ("Blue Eye")
4. "Sviraj nešto narodno" ("Play Something Folksy") featuring Donna Ares
