= Knežina, Sokolac =

Knežina
- Village
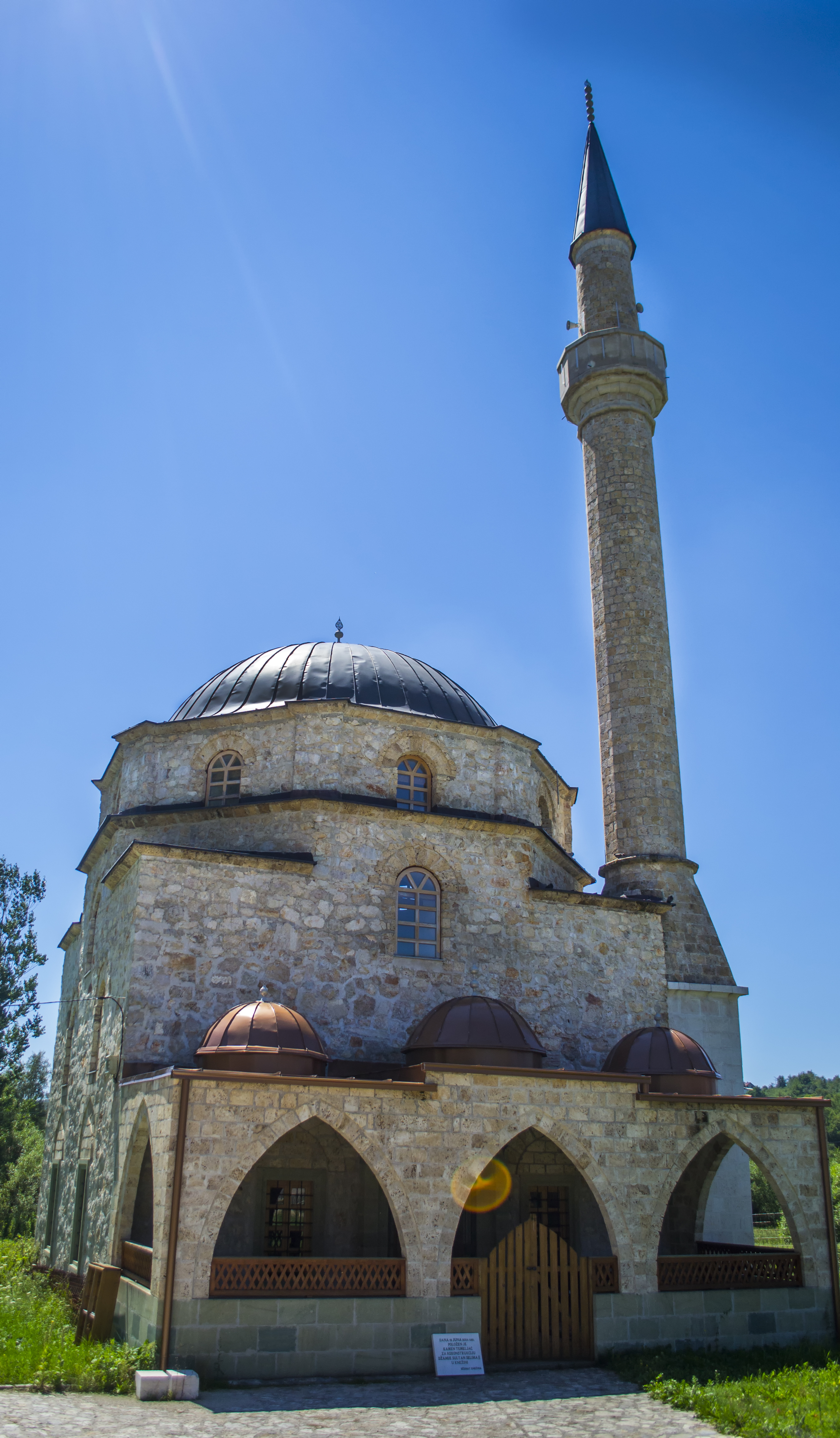
- Sultan Selim Mosque
- Interactive map of Knežina
- Location within Bosnia and Herzegovina
- Coordinates: 44°01′12″N 18°45′32″E
- Country: Bosnia and Herzegovina
- Entity: Republika Srpska
- Municipality: Sokolac
- Time zone: UTC+1 (CET)
  - Summer (DST): UTC+2 (CEST)

Knežina (Serbian Cyrillic: Кнежина) is a village in the municipality of Sokolac, city of Istočno Sarajevo in the entity of Republika Srpska, Bosnia and Herzegovina.

== History ==
In 1991 the area was incorporated into the SAO Romanija, a Serb-established autonomous province, which later merged with other SAOs to form Republika Srpska in 1992.

The present-day settlement of Kadića Brdo was historically a hamlet (zaseok) of Knežina.

== Demographic history ==
According to the 1991 census, the village had 465 inhabitants, out of whom 289 were Muslims/Bosniaks (62,15%), 170 Serbs (36,56%).

== Notable people ==
- Halid Bešlić, singer
