= U ime ljubavi =

Studio album by Halid Bešlić
- Released: 2000
- Genre: Folk
- Label: Intakt Records

Halid Bešlić chronology
Robinja (1998)	U ime ljubavi (2000)	Prvi poljubac (2003)

U ime ljubavi (English translation: In the Name of Love) is the fourteenth studio album of Bosnian singer Halid Bešlić. It was released in 2000.

== Track listing ==
1. U ime ljubavi (In the Name of Love)
2. Srce ledeno (Icy Heart)
3. Crna ruža (Black Rose)
4. Kao nekad (As Before)
5. Vazda (Always)
6. Ne bolujem (I Do Not Suffer)
7. Poželjet ćeš (You'll Miss It)
8. Sunce jedino (One Sun)
9. Hej, noći (Hey, Nights)
10. Pruži mi ruku (Extended Your Hand)
