= Slavo Kukić =

Bosnian sociologist and academic (1954–2024)

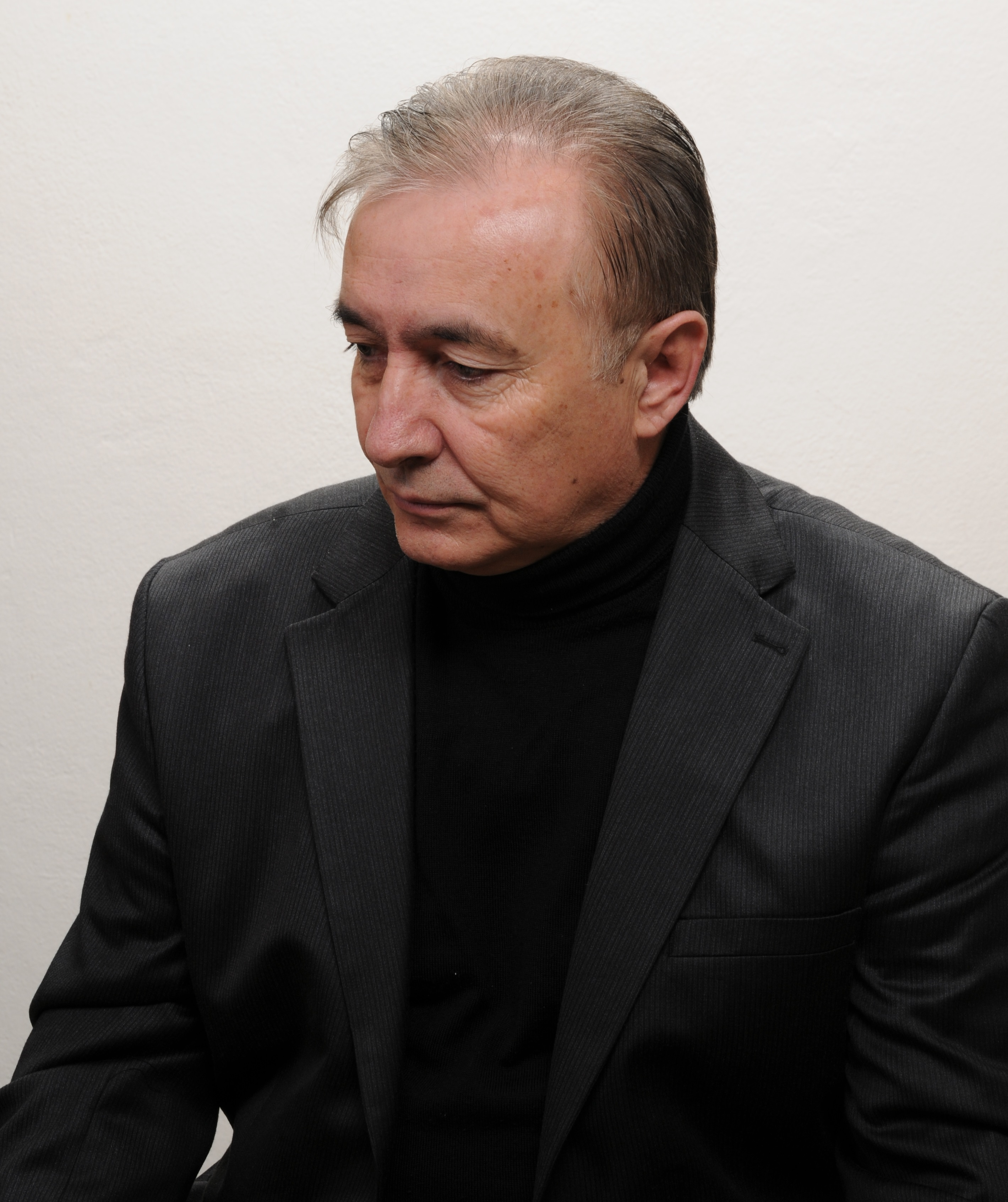
- Kukić in 2016
- Born: 21 July 1954; Posušje, PR Bosnia and Herzegovina, FPR Yugoslavia
- Died: 7 September 2024 (aged 70); Mostar, Bosnia and Herzegovina
- Education: University of Sarajevo (BA, MS, PhD)
- Scientific career
- Fields: Sociology
- Workplaces: University of Mostar
- Thesis: Njemački socijaldemokratizam kao predstavnik socijalreformističke alternative revolucionarnom marksizmu (German social democracy as a representative of socialist reformist alternative to the revolutionary Marxism) (1987)

Slavo Kukić (21 July 1954 – 7 September 2024) was a Bosnian sociologist and academic who was a professor and PhD in Marxist sociology. He was a member of the Academy of Sciences and Arts of Bosnia and Herzegovina.

Born in Posušje in 1954, Kukić obtained his BA, MS and PhD from the Faculty of Political Sciences of the University of Sarajevo. He was professor of Sociology, Methodology of Scientific Research and Consumer Behavior at the Faculty of Economics of the University of Mostar, and taught several undergraduate, graduate and postgraduate doctoral studies in Bosnia and Herzegovina and its neighboring countries. He also wrote opinion columns for a variety of media organisations, such as Al Jazeera Balkans.

== Biography ==
Kukić was born in Posušje, SFR Yugoslavia, present-day Bosnia and Herzegovina on 21 July 1954. He graduated from the Faculty of Political Sciences in Sarajevo in February 1977, and from the Interdisciplinary Postgraduate Study of the University of Sarajevo in 1983. He started his career in 1977 as an associate of the Municipal Assembly of Posušje. After that he was a director of the Marxist Centre. Kukić was a professor in a high school in Posušje, and later a director. In 1987, he was elected president of the Executive Council of the Municipal Assembly of Posušje. In 1992, he was named professor at the Faculty of Economics of the University of Mostar.

Following the 2010 Bosnian general election, the Social Democratic Party designated Kukić as the new Chairman of the Council of Ministers. He was subsequently nominated for Chairman in July 2011 by the country's Presidency. Croat and Serb parties voted against the nomination. Although Kukić received a majority of votes in the House of Representatives, he failed to receive the necessary 2/3 majority of votes from Republika Srpska representatives. Ultimately, Croatian Democratic Union member Vjekoslav Bevanda was appointed Chairman of the Council of Ministers in January 2012.

=== Attack ===
Kukić claimed that he was attacked with a baseball bat in 2014 due to his statements regarding the controversial war criminal Dario Kordić. After the attack, Kukić said that he was not significantly injured. Federal Prime Minister Nermin Nikšić condemned the attack, calling it "another of a series of fascist outbursts".

=== Death ===
Kukić died on 7 September 2024, at the age of 70.

== Education ==
- Department of Political Science, University of Sarajevo, 1977
- Master of Science, University of Sarajevo, 1978–1983.
- Doctor of Sociological Sciences, University of Sarajevo, 1986.
