= Knežina, Črnomelj =

Village in southern Slovenia

Knežina
- Location in Slovenia
- Coordinates: 45°30′7.9″N 15°12′50.63″E
- Country: Slovenia
- Traditional region: White Carniola
- Statistical region: Southeast Slovenia
- Municipality: Črnomelj

Area
  - Total: 2.57 km^{2} (0.99 sq mi)
- Elevation: 211.7 m (695 ft)

Population (2020)
  - Total: 21
  - Density: 8.2/km^{2} (21/sq mi)
- Postal code: 8343

Knežina (pronounced [knɛˈʒiːna]) is a settlement southeast of Dragatuš in the Municipality of Črnomelj in the White Carniola area of southeastern Slovenia. The area is part of the traditional region of Lower Carniola and is now included in the Southeast Slovenia Statistical Region.
