= Prud, Bosnia and Herzegovina =

Prud Пруд
- Village
- Location within Bosnia and Herzegovina
- Coordinates: 45°4′18″N 18°27′7″E
- Country: Bosnia and Herzegovina
- Entity: Federation of Bosnia and Herzegovina; Republika Srpska
- Canton Region: Posavina; Doboj
- Municipality: Odžak; Šamac

Area
  - Total: 2.68 sq mi (6.94 km^{2})

Population (2013)
  - Total: 941
  - Density: 351/sq mi (136/km^{2})
- Time zone: UTC+1 (CET)
  - Summer (DST): UTC+2 (CEST)

Prud (Cyrillic: Пруд) is a village in the municipalities of Odžak (Federation of Bosnia and Herzegovina) and Šamac (Republika Srpska), Bosnia and Herzegovina. The Šamac part of the village has been renamed Njegoševo.

== Demographics ==
According to the 2013 census, its population was 941, all of them living in the Odžak part,

Ethnicity in 2013
Ethnicity	Number	Percentage
Croats	912	96.9%
Serbs	13	1.4%
Bosniaks	12	1.3%
other/undeclared	4	0.4%
Total	941	100%
