= 2008 in politics =

These are some of the notable events relating to politics in 2008:

== Events ==
=== January ===
- January 3 - The first caucuses in the 2008 U.S. presidential primary season for both Democrats and Republicans were held in Iowa. Then-U.S. Senator Barack Obama of Illinois won the Democrat contest, whilst former Arkansas Governor Mike Huckabee won the Republican race.
- January 8 - The second 2008 U.S. presidential primary season nominating contests for both Democrats and Republicans were held in New Hampshire. Then-U.S. Senator Hillary Clinton of New York won the Democrat contest, whilst then-U.S. Senator of Arizona John McCain won the Republican race.
- January 14 - Cyprus, Malta, and Akrotiri and Dhekelia adopt the euro.
- January 15 - Slovenia takes over the presidency of the European Union as the first of new member states.
- January 17 - The Venezuelan bolívar, as a result of a government decree issued on March 7, 2007, is revalued at a ratio of 1 to 1000 and renamed the Bolívar fuerte (ISO 4217 code: VEF).
- January 21 - The 30th Dakar Rally is canceled due to international political tension and the murder of four French tourists on December 24, 2007.
- January 22 - An attempted assassination of Maldivian president Maumoon Abdul Gayoom is thwarted after a Boy Scout grabbed the attacker's knife. The Boy Scout was injured, but after a scuffle ensued police arrested the attacker.
- January 22 - The Kuomintang (KMT)-led Pan-Blue Coalition wins the legislative elections in Taiwan with over 70% of the votes.
- January 22 - The South Korean Presidential Transition Team announces a plan to merge the Ministry of Unification, which works toward unification with North Korea, with the Foreign Ministry, but does not follow through on the idea.
- January 23 - Presidential election in Serbia.
- January 23 - Legislative elections in Cuba.
- January 24 - A peace deal ends the Kivu conflict in the Democratic Republic of the Congo
- January 24 - Peter Hain resigns as British Wales Secretary and British Work and Pensions Secretary after the Electoral Commission refers the failure to report donations to the Metropolitan Police Service. Prime Minister Gordon Brown called for a quick cabinet shuffle.

The new flag of Iraq.

- January 24 - Iraqi Parliament adopts a new national flag, removing three stars associated with the Baath Party; a permanent design is expected within the next year.
- January 24 - Prime Minister of Italy Romano Prodi resigns his post after losing the vote of confidence in the Senate.
- January 30 - King Bhumibol Adulyadej swears in Samak Sundaravej as the new Prime Minister of Thailand.

=== February ===
- February 2 - Rebels attack the capital of Chad, N'Djamena.
- February 3 - Boris Tadić is reelected in the second round of the Serbian presidential elections.
- February 3 - Parliamentary elections in Monaco.
- February 4 - A Palestinian suicide bomber kills one and wounds thirteen in a Dimona, Israel shopping center.

Primaries and caucuses in U.S. presidential election are held in 24 states.

- February 5 - Super Tuesday, massive multi-state primary in U.S. presidential election, with primaries and caucuses in 24 states, is held.
- January 5 - Mikheil Saakashvili is reelected following early presidential elections in Georgia.
- February 7 - General election called for Belize's 31 House seats; a referendum to be held simultaneously to determine whether the upper house should be elected.
- February 11 - President of East Timor José Ramos-Horta is seriously wounded in an attack on his home by rebel soldiers. Rebel leader Alfredo Reinado is killed by Ramos-Horta's security guards during the attack.
- February 13 - Prime Minister Kevin Rudd of Australia delivers a formal apology to the Stolen Generations.
- February 13 - Prime Minister of Malaysia Abdullah Ahmad Badawi dissolves the Malaysian parliament.
- February 16 - Václav Klaus is reelected as the President of the Czech Republic.

Flag of Kosovo

- February 17 - Kosovo formally declares independence from Serbia, despite opposition from Serbia, Russia, China, Spain, Romania, and other nations. However Albania, Belgium, Croatia, France, Germany, Italy, U.K., and United States express support after an emergency meeting of the United Nations Security Council.
- February 17 - Presidential election in Cyprus.
- February 18 - General election is held in Pakistan, delayed from January 8 due to riots in the wake of the assassination of Benazir Bhutto. Opposition parties, including Bhutto's, take more than half of the seats, while President Pervez Musharraf's party suffers a huge defeat.
- February 19 - Presidential election in Armenia.
- February 19 - After 49 years in office, Fidel Castro announces his resignation as President of Cuba.
- February 21 - Hundreds of thousands of Serbs take to the streets in Belgrade to protest against Kosovo's declaration of independence and the partial international recognition of it.
- February 22 – The Australian Parliament descends into chaos with opposition frontbenchers ejected, question time suspended, and speakers unable to control the house. A cardboard cut-out of the Prime Minister is brought into the parliament by opposition members angry about sitting time on a Friday.

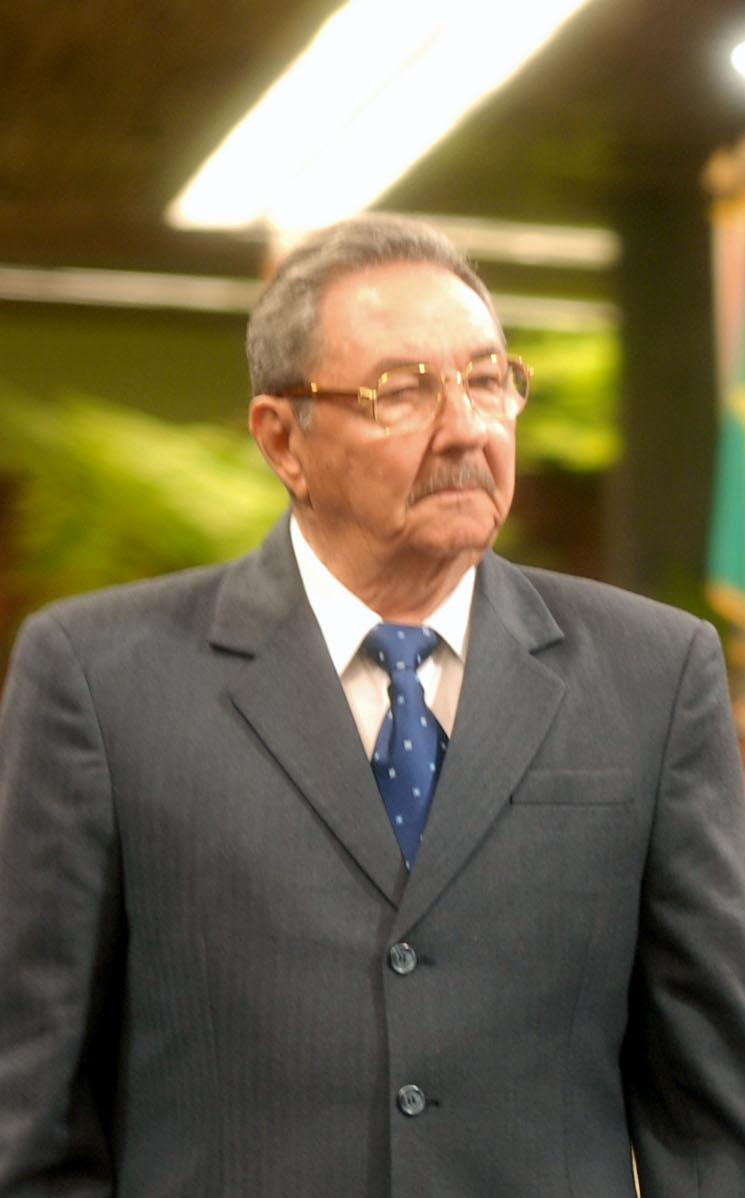
Raúl Castro

- February 24 - Raúl Castro is unanimously elected as President of Cuba by the National Assembly.
- February 24 - Dimitris Christofias is elected President of Cyprus after the second round of voting in the country's presidential election.
- February 25 - Lee Myung-bak starts his five-year term as the 17th President of South Korea.
- February 27 - Jemaah Islamiyah leader Mas Selamat bin Kastari escapes from a detention center in Singapore.
- February 28 - Former Prime Minister of Thailand Thaksin Shinawatra is arrested on corruption charges upon returning to Thailand after months of exile.

=== March ===
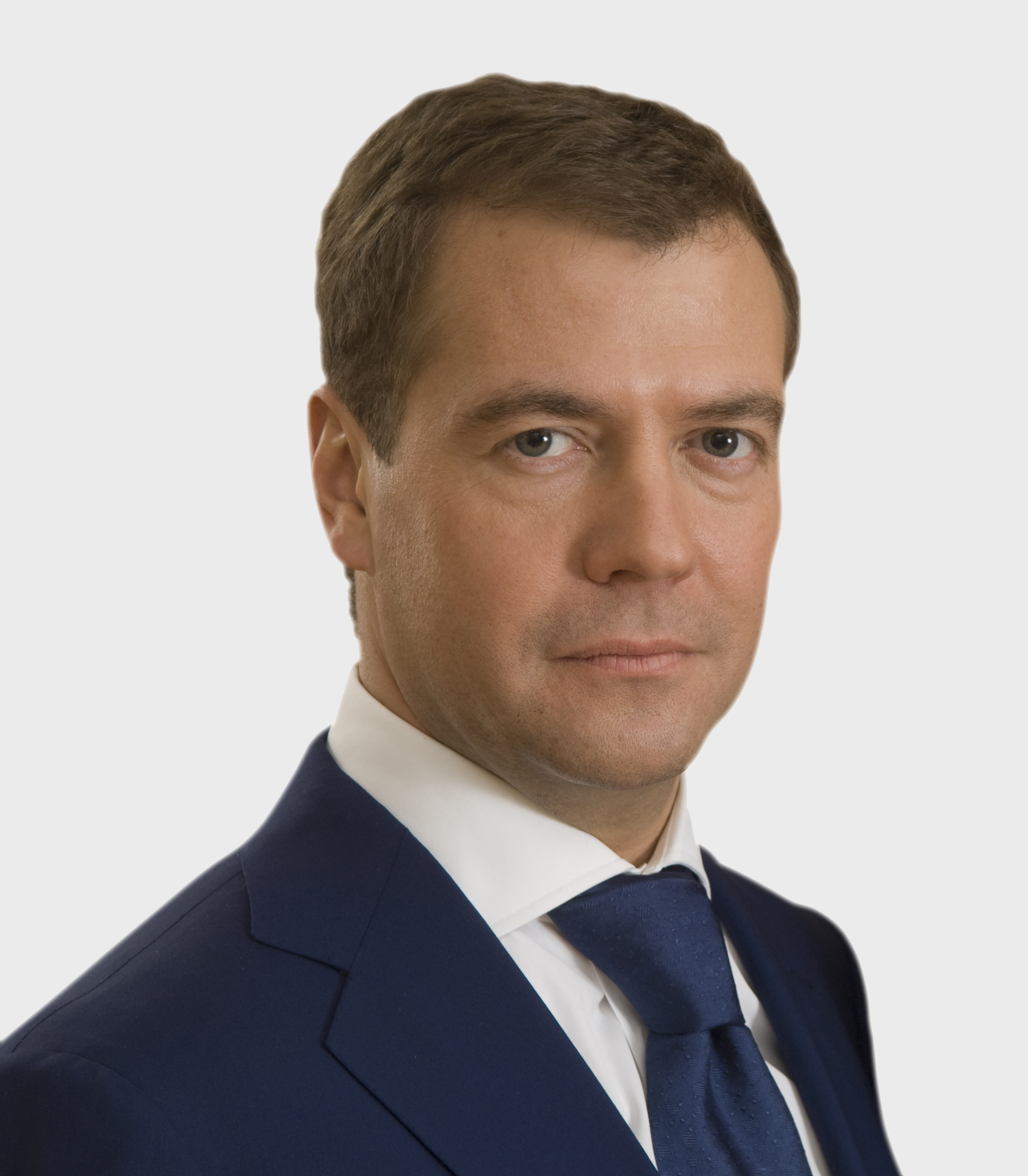
Dmitry Medvedev

- March 1 - In Gaza Strip at least 52 Palestinians and two Israeli soldiers are killed in the most intense Israeli air strikes since 2005.
- March 2 - 2008 Russian presidential election: Dmitry Medvedev is elected President of Russia with about 70% of the vote. He is scheduled to succeed Vladimir Putin in May.
- March 2 - 2008 Andean diplomatic crisis: Venezuela and Ecuador move troops to the Colombian border following a Colombian raid against FARC guerrillas inside Ecuador's national territory in which senior commander Raúl Reyes was killed.
- March 3 - United Nations Security Council passes Resolution 1803, enacting new sanctions against Iran in response to the country's nuclear program and uranium enrichment. The vote passes 14–0, and marks the first time that trade with Iran in goods that have both civilian and military uses is banned.
- March 4 - John McCain secures the 2008 U.S. Republican Party presidential nomination after winning primary elections in Texas, Vermont, Ohio, and Rhode Island.
- March 6 - Eight Israeli civilians are killed and nine wounded when a lone Palestinian attacker opens fire at the Mercaz HaRav Jewish seminary in Jerusalem.
- March 8 - General election in Malaysia: First time since the 1969 elections that the Barisan Nasional coalition fails to win a two-thirds supermajority in the Dewan Rakyat.
- March 8 - General election in Malta.
- March 9 - Medical and higher education fees referendum in Hungary.
- March 9 - General election in Spain: The governing PSOE led by Prime Minister José Luis Rodríguez Zapatero is reelected with the most seats in the Congress of Deputies.
- March 13 - New York Governor Eliot Spitzer announces his resignation effective March 17 days after being linked to a high-priced prostitution ring.
- March 14 - 2008 Tibetan unrest: Demonstrations by Tibetan separatists turn violent as rioters target government and Han Chinese-owned buildings.
- March 14 - Iranian legislative election.
- March 14 - By a recorded vote of 39 in favour to 7 against the United Nations General Assembly adopted Resolution 62/243, demanding the immediate withdrawal of all Armenian forces from the occupied territories of Azerbaijan.
- March 20 - A permanent coalition government agreement is reached in Belgium, ending a nine-month stalemate, as Yves Leterme is sworn in as Prime Minister.
- March 22 - Republic of China presidential election is held in Taiwan. The Kuomintang (KMT) nominee Ma Ying-jeou won.
- March 24 - Bhutan holds its first-ever elections to its National Assembly.
- March 25 - Yousaf Raza Gillani becomes the 27th Prime Minister of Pakistan.

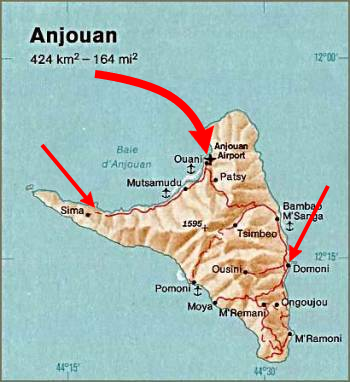
Invasion of Anjouan

- March 25 - African Union and Comoros forces invade the rebel-held island of Anjouan.
- March 29 - Zimbabwe presidential election.
- March–April - Rising food and fuel prices trigger riots and unrest in the Third World.

=== April ===
- April 2 - Senior Leader of Nepali Congress Bal Chandra Poudel seriously injured during an attacked by Maoists of Nepal on the ongoing electoral period of 2008 Nepalese Constituent Assembly election.
- April 2 - The 20th NATO summit begins in Bucharest, Romania.
- April 3 - Albania and Croatia are invited to join NATO in 2009. The membership bid of the Republic of Macedonia is rejected due to opposition by Greece. Bosnia and Herzegovina and Montenegro engage in an Intensified Dialogue with NATO.
- April 6 - Presidential election in Montenegro.
- April 8 - Sark dismantled its feudal system to comply with the European Convention on Human Rights. The Privy Council approved the Sark law reforms, and the first elections under the new law will be held in December 2008 and the new chamber will first convene in January 2009.
- April 10 - Assembly elections in Nepal: Maoists win a plurality of seats in the Assembly in the first election in Nepal in nine years.
- April 13 - Elections in Italy: The Silvio Berlusconi-led coalition, which consists of The People of Freedom, Lega Nord, and Movement for Autonomy parties, wins a majority of seats in both the Chamber of Deputies and the Senate.
- April 20 - Fernando Lugo is elected President of Paraguay. This is the first time in 61 years that the Colorado Party has lost a presidential election.
- April 24 - Teachers in England and Wales stage the first national strike in more than 20 years over issues of pay.
- April 27 - The Taliban attempts to assassinate Afghan President Hamid Karzai in a military parade in Kabul.

=== May ===
- May 1 - Local elections, for 137 English councils and all Welsh councils in the United Kingdom.
- May 1 - Elections for the London Mayor and London Assembly take place with Boris Johnson becoming the second Mayor of London.
- May 2 - May 3 - The Presidents of Central European States meet in Ohrid, Republic of Macedonia.
- May 7 - Brian Cowen is elected the 11th Taoiseach (Prime Minister) of Ireland, succeeding Bertie Ahern, after a vote in the Dáil Éireann.
- May 7 - Dmitry Medvedev is sworn in as the President of Russia.
- May 8 - Vladimir Putin is confirmed as the 10th Prime Minister of Russia after a vote in the State Duma.
- May 8 - Silvio Berlusconi is sworn in as the 81st Prime Minister of Italy.
- May 10 - Myanmar holds a constitutional referendum.
- May 11 - Local and parliamentary elections in Serbia.
- May 14 - Six Iranian Baháʼí Faith leaders are arrested in Iran.
- May 15 - California becomes the second U.S. state after Massachusetts in 2004 to legalize same-sex marriage after the state's Supreme Court rules a previous ban unconstitutional.
- May 16 - Presidential election in the Dominican Republic.
- May 16 - The fifth Latin America, the Caribbean and the European Union Summit is held in Lima, Peru.
- May 17 - Parliamentary elections are held in Kuwait.
- May 20 - Chen Shui-bian steps down after eight years as Taiwan's president due to term limits and is replaced by Ma Ying-jeou who was elected two months earlier.
- May 21 - Legislative elections are held in Georgia.
- May 22 - Council of the Presidents of Ukraine and Azerbaijan is formed.
- May 23 - The Union of South American Nations, a supranational union, is created by a union between the Andean Community and Mercosur.
- May 23 - The International Court of Justice awards Middle Rocks to Malaysia and Pedra Branca to Singapore, ending a 29-year territorial dispute between the two countries.
- May 25 - Michel Suleiman is elected President of Lebanon by the Parliament. The election had been postponed 19 times due to a parliamentary stalemate.
- May 28 - The Federal Democratic Republic of Nepal is established after the Assembly votes overwhelmingly in favor of abolishing the country's 240-year-old monarchy. Girija Prasad Koirala becomes temporary Head of state.

=== June ===
- June 1 - Parliamentary elections in the Republic of Macedonia.
- June 1 - Referendum on the process of naturalization fails by a wide margin in Switzerland, leaving in place a system in which applicants are approved by elected bodies rather than popular votes.
- June 3 - Barack Obama becomes the presumptive nominee of the Democratic Party, becoming the first African American to do so in a major U.S. political party.
- June 11 - Canadian Prime Minister Stephen Harper apologizes to Canada's First Nations for the Canadian residential school system.
- June 12 - Ireland votes to reject the Treaty of Lisbon, in the only referendum to be held by a European Union member state on the treaty.
- June 27 - President Robert Mugabe is reelected with 85.5% of the vote in the second round of the controversial Zimbabwean presidential election.
- June 27 - Two ministers of the Guatemalan government are killed in a helicopter crash in Alta Verapaz.
- June 29 - Legislative elections are held in Mongolia.

=== July ===
- July 2 - Íngrid Betancourt and 14 other hostages are rescued from FARC by Colombian security forces.
- July 5 - Tens of thousands of South Koreans continue to protest against the Lee Myung-bak administration's decision to allow U.S. beef imports to resume.
- July 7–July 9 - 34th G8 summit held in Tōyako, Hokkaidō in Japan

=== August ===
- August 18 - The President of Pakistan Pervez Musharraf resigned from the presidency after impeachment pressures by coalition government of Pakistan Peoples Party and Pakistan Muslim League.
- August 25–August 28 - The Democratic National Convention in Denver, Colorado nominates Barack Obama for President of the United States, and Joe Biden for vice president.

=== September ===
- September 1–September 4 - The Republican National Convention in Minneapolis-Saint Paul, Minnesota nominates John McCain for President of the United States, and Sarah Palin for vice president.

=== November ===
- November 4 - Barack Obama was elected as the 44th President of the United States, becoming the first African American elected to the office. Congressional elections for the House of Representatives and one third of the Senators (second class) were also held.
- November 4 - Gubernatorial election slated in Puerto Rico to elect the governor of the island.
- November 8 - New Zealand held a general election, which John Key's right-wing National Party won, with deals from the ACT, United Future, and Māori parties.
- November 25 - Greenland holds an election for increased autonomy from Denmark.
- November 28 - Legislative election in Romania.

=== December ===
- December 9 - Illinois Governor Rod Blagojevich is arrested by FBI agents, and charged with trying to sell the United States Senate seat vacated by President-elect Barack Obama.
- December 30 - Embattled Illinois Governor Rod Blagojevich names Roland Burris to replace President-elect Barack Obama in the United States Senate.

== Deaths ==
=== January ===
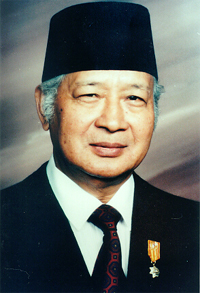
Suharto

- January 1 - Thiyagarajah Maheswaran, Sri Lankan Tamil politician (born 1960)
- January 2 - Lee S. Dreyfus, American politician (born 1926)
- January 3 - Werner Dollinger, German politician (born 1918)
- January 3 - Petru Dugulescu, Romanian Baptist pastor, poet, and politician (born 1945)
- January 5 - Giovanni Rinaldo Coronas, Italian politician (born 1919)
- January 5 - Raymond Forni, French politician (born 1941)
- January 5 - İhsan Saraçlar, Turkish lawyer and politician (born 1928)
- January 6 - Alekos Michaelides, Cypriot politician (born 1933)
- January 7 - Alwyn Schlebusch, South African politician (born 1917)
- January 10 - Andrés Henestrosa, Mexican writer and politician (born 1906)
- January 13 - Walter Zimper, Austrian politician (born 1942)
- January 14 - Vincenz Liechtenstein, Austrian politician (born 1950)
- January 16 - Nikola Kljusev, Macedonian Prime Minister (born 1927)
- January 17 - Trevor Sprigg, Australian politician (born 1946)
- January 26 - George Habash, Palestinian politician (born 1926)
- January 26 - Aziz Sedki, Egyptian Prime Minister (born 1920)
- January 27 - Botho Prinz zu Sayn-Wittgenstein-Hohenstein, German politician (born 1927)
- January 27 - Suharto, 2nd President of Indonesia (born 1921)

=== February ===
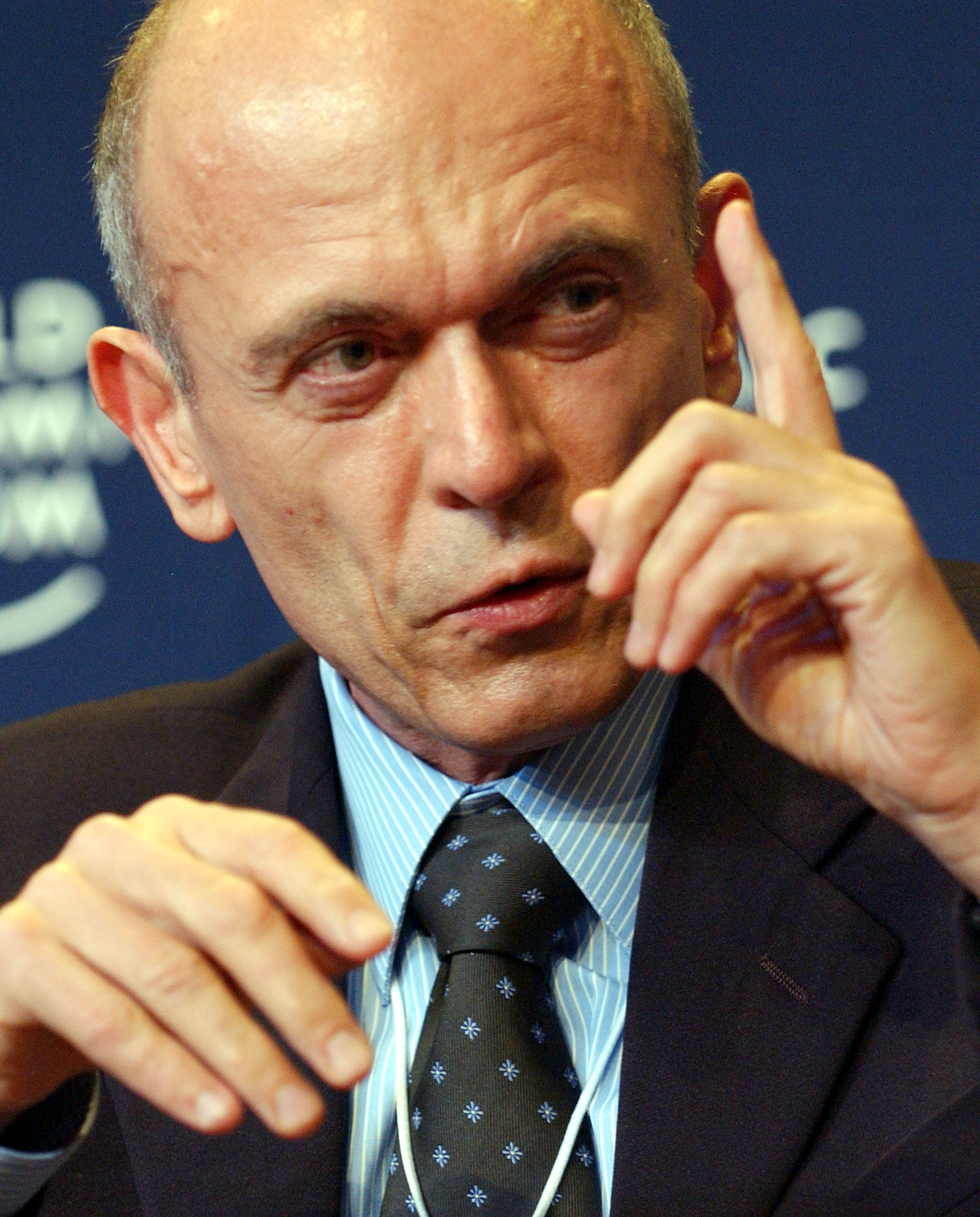
Janez Drnovšek

- February 2 - Ahmad Bourghani, Iranian politician (b. c. 1959)
- February 2 - Earl Butz, American government official (born 1909)
- February 7 - Hoang Minh Chinh, Vietnamese politician and dissident (born 1922)
- February 11 - Tom Lantos, American politician (born 1928)
- February 16 - Hans Leussink, German politician (born 1912)
- February 19 - Jean-Michel Bertrand, French politician (born 1943)
- February 21 - Sufi Abu Taleb, Acting President of Egypt (born 1925)
- February 23 - Joaquim Pinto de Andrade, Angolan politician (born 1926)
- February 23 - Janez Drnovšek, 2nd President and 2nd Prime Minister of Slovenia (born 1950)
- February 26 - Tyronne Fernando, Sri Lankan politician (born 1941)
- February 27 - William F. Buckley, Jr., American author and conservative commentator (born 1925)

=== March ===
- March 3 - Annemarie Renger, German politician (born 1919)
- March 6 - Gustaw Holoubek, Polish actor, director, and politician (born 1923)
- March 7 - Isaías Carrasco, Basque politician (born 1964)
- March 7 - Francis Pym, British politician (born 1922)
- March 12 - Károly Németh, Hungarian politician (born 1922)
- March 12 - Howard Metzenbaum, American politician (born 1917)
- March 14 - Clyde Cameron, Australian politician (born 1913)
- March 16 - Anura Bandaranaike, Sri Lankan politician (born 1949)
- March 21 - Gabriel París Gordillo, Colombian President and military governor (born 1910)

=== April ===
- April 4 - Wu Xueqian, Chinese politician (born 1921)
- April 12 - Patrick Hillery, 6th President of Ireland (born 1923)
- April 17 - Aimé Césaire, French Martinican poet, author, and politician (born 1913)
- April 29 - Charles Tilly, American sociologist, historian, and political scientist (born 1929)
- April 30 - Juancho Evertsz, Dutch Antillean politician (born 1923)

=== May ===
- May 1 - Anthony Mamo, 1st President of Malta (born 1909)
- May 3 - Leopoldo Calvo Sotelo, 74th Prime Minister of Spain (born 1926)
- May 7 - Thijs Wöltgens, Dutch politician (born 1943)
- May 13 - Saad Al-Abdullah Al-Salim Al-Sabah, Emir of Kuwait (born 1930)
- May 17 - Sophan Sophiaan, Indonesian actor and politician (born 1944)
- May 17 - Lionel Van Deerlin, American politician (born 1914)
- May 20 - Crispin Beltran, Filipino politician and labor leader (born 1933)
- May 20 - Hamilton Jordan, American politician (born 1944)
- May 23 - Utah Phillips, American folk singer and political activist (born 1935)
- May 24 - Isaac Lipschits, Dutch political scientist and historian (born 1930)

=== June ===
- June 1 - Tommy Lapid, Israeli television presenter, journalist and politician (born 1931)
- June 2 - Sheriff Mustapha Dibba, Gambian politician (b. unknown)
- June 4 - Ivan Herasymov, Ukrainian politician (born 1921)
- June 7 - Joseph Kabui, Papua New Guinean secessionist (born 1954)
- June 8 - Danilo Lagbas, Filipino politician (born 1952)
- June 11 - Võ Văn Kiệt, Vietnamese prime minister (born 1922)
- June 23 - Arthur Chung, President of Guyana (born 1918)

=== July ===
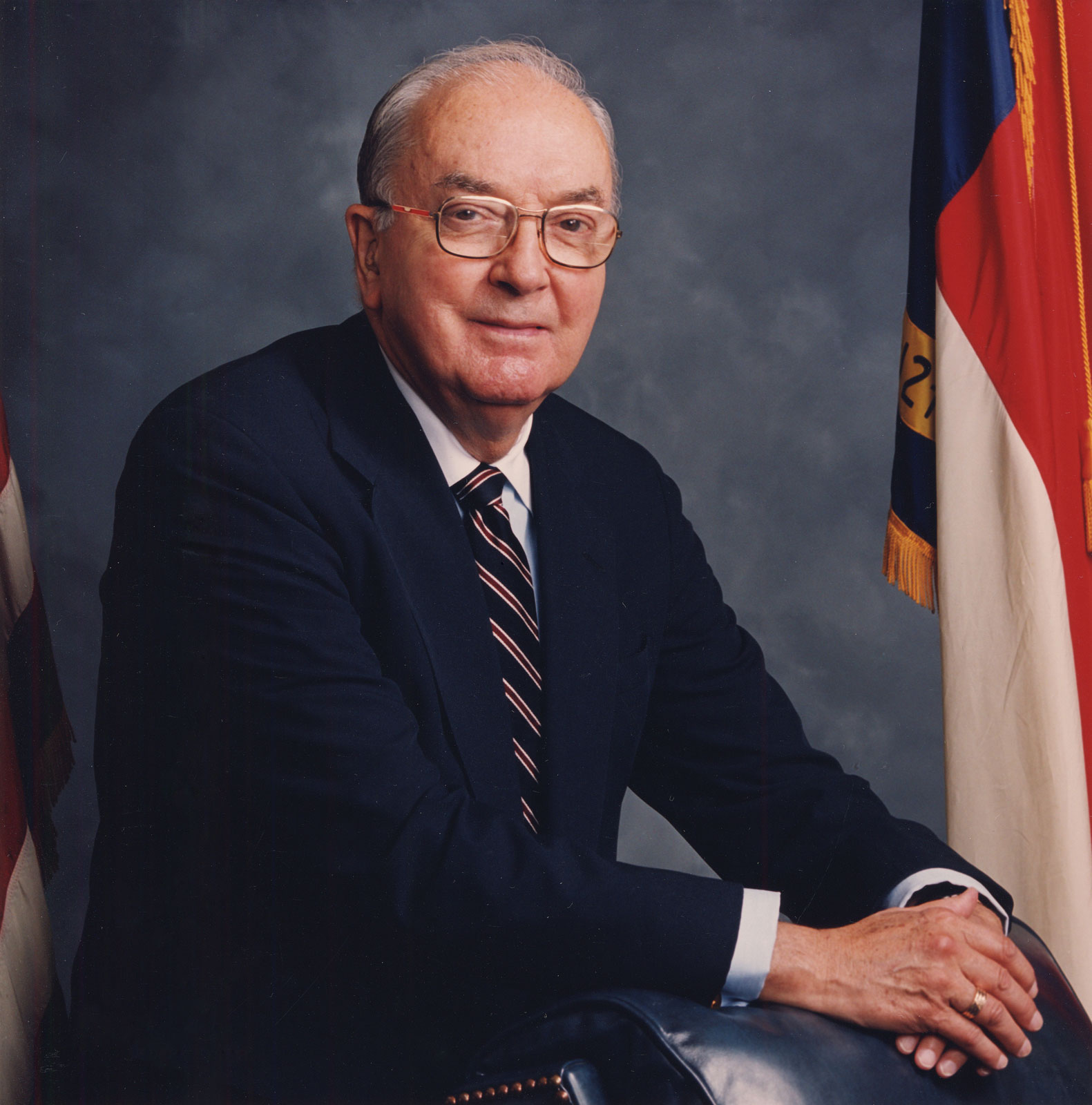
Jesse Helms

- July 1 - Mogens Glistrup, Danish politician and lawyer (born 1926)
- July 4 - Jesse Helms, American politician (born 1921)
- July 5 - René Harris, President of Nauru (born 1947)
- July 7 - Clem McSpadden, American politician (born 1925)
- July 9 - Séamus Brennan, Irish politician (born 1948)
- July 12 - Tony Snow, American political commentator (born 1955)
- July 13 - Bronisław Geremek, Polish social historian and politician (born 1932)
- July 23 - Kurt Furgler, Swiss politician (born 1924)
- July 23 - Ahmet Hadžipašić, Bosnian politician (born 1952)

=== August ===
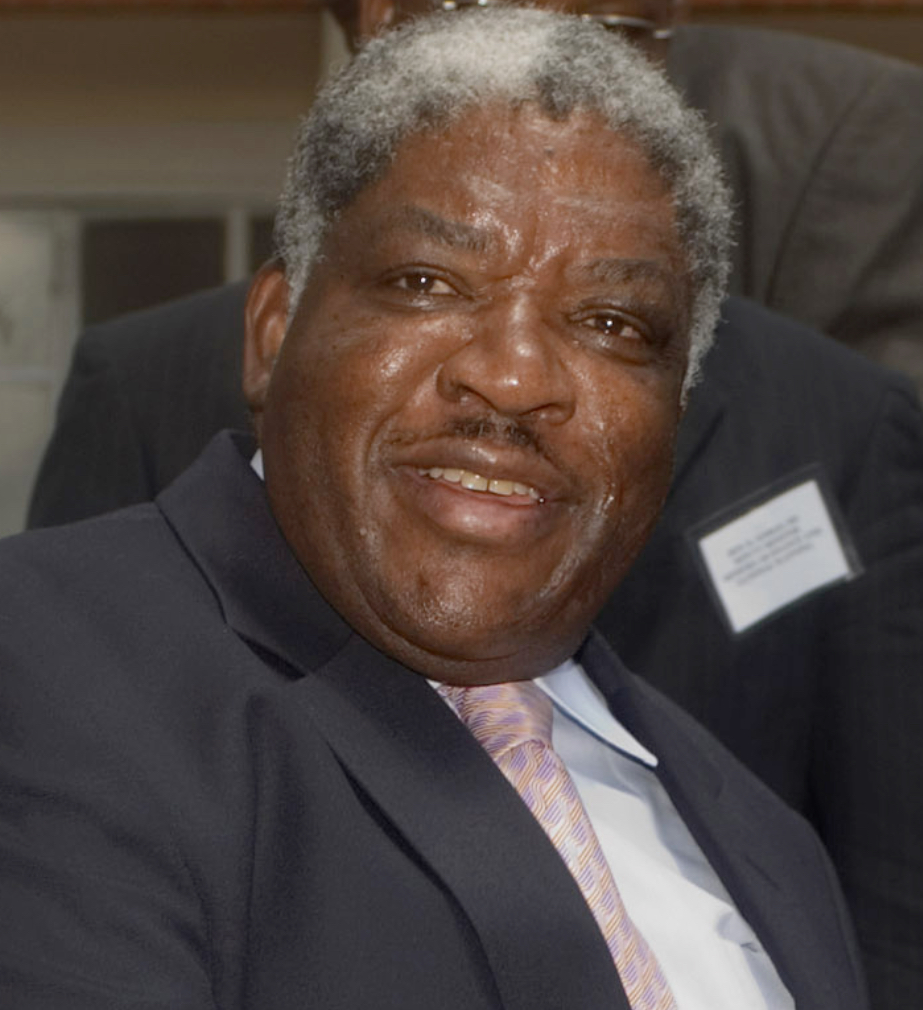
Levy Mwanawasa

- August 1 - Harkishan Singh Surjeet, Indian politician (born 1916)
- August 2 - Helga Gitmark, Norwegian politician (born 1929)
- August 2 - John F. Seiberling, American politician (born 1918)
- August 8 - Antonio Gava, Italian politician (born 1930)
- August 11 - Fred Sinowatz, Austrian politician (born 1929)
- August 13 - Bill Gwatney, American politician (born 1959)
- August 19 - Levy Mwanawasa, President of Zambia (born 1948)

=== September ===
- September 4 - Erik Nielsen, Canadian politician (born 1924)

== See also ==
- Electoral calendar 2008
- List of years in politics
- 2008 in the European Union
- 2008 in LGBT rights
