= Grbavica =

Grbavica may refer to:

== Places ==
- Grbavica (Brčko), Bosnia and Herzegovina
- Grbavica (Novi Sad), Serbia
- Grbavica (Sarajevo), Bosnia and Herzegovina

== Arts and entertainment ==
- Grbavica (film), a 2006 Bosnian film
- Grbavica (song), a 1997 song performed by Mladen Vojičić Tifa, from the album Grbavica
