= The Maniacs =

Football club supporters

- Abbreviation: TM, TM87
- Founded: 1987
- Type: Ultras group
- Club: FK Željezničar Sarajevo
- Motto: Željezničar za život cijeli (Željezničar for life)
- Location: Sarajevo, Bosnia and Herzegovina
- Stadium: Grbavica Stadium
- Stand: South (Tribina JUG)
- Colours

The Maniacs (Bosnian: Manijaci) are a group of Ultras of the Bosnian football club FK Željezničar Sarajevo. There are also subgroups like Blue Tigers, Joint Union, Urban Corps, Stari Grad, Curva Sud and Vendetta.

== History ==
Željezničar always had great support from fans all over Bosnia and Herzegovina and Yugoslavia (when Bosnia was a part of Yugoslavia). When Željeznicar won Yugoslav First League in 1971–72 season, fans followed their club across Yugoslavia.

In 1976–77 season Željeznicar was relegated from the Yugoslav First League, but that didn't stop Željo fans to follow Željo in to the second league, so, despite being in the 2nd league, th average attendance at Grbavica Stadium was 10 000 which wasn't often in the league, and after one season in the 2nd league Željeznicar won a promotion and was again in the first league.

During that time the most passionate Željeznicar fans were located on the south stand of the Grbavica Stadium . Željeznicar was a club supported mainly by working class citizens, and their city rivals FK Sarajevo by upper class.

In the 1981 Zeljeznicar played in Yugoslav Cup finals against FK Velez Mostar. The match was played at Marakana stadium, and the attendance was 40 000. Željeznicar fans were on the east side of stadium. Despite their great support, Željo lost the finals.

The biggest accomplishment of the club was when they played the semi-finals of UEFA Cup in 1984–85 season. That year Željo had a massive support not only in Sarajevo, but also in other cities in Bosnia, such as Konjic, Živinice, Lukavac, and there was even a smaller group of supporters who were from Novi Sad.

In 1987, the most passionate fans of Željeznicar formed an ultras group called The Maniacs. The Maniacs are located on the south stand of Grbavica. Subgroups Blue Tigers and Joint Union were also formed later on, and the newly formed ones are Urban Corps and Vendetta.

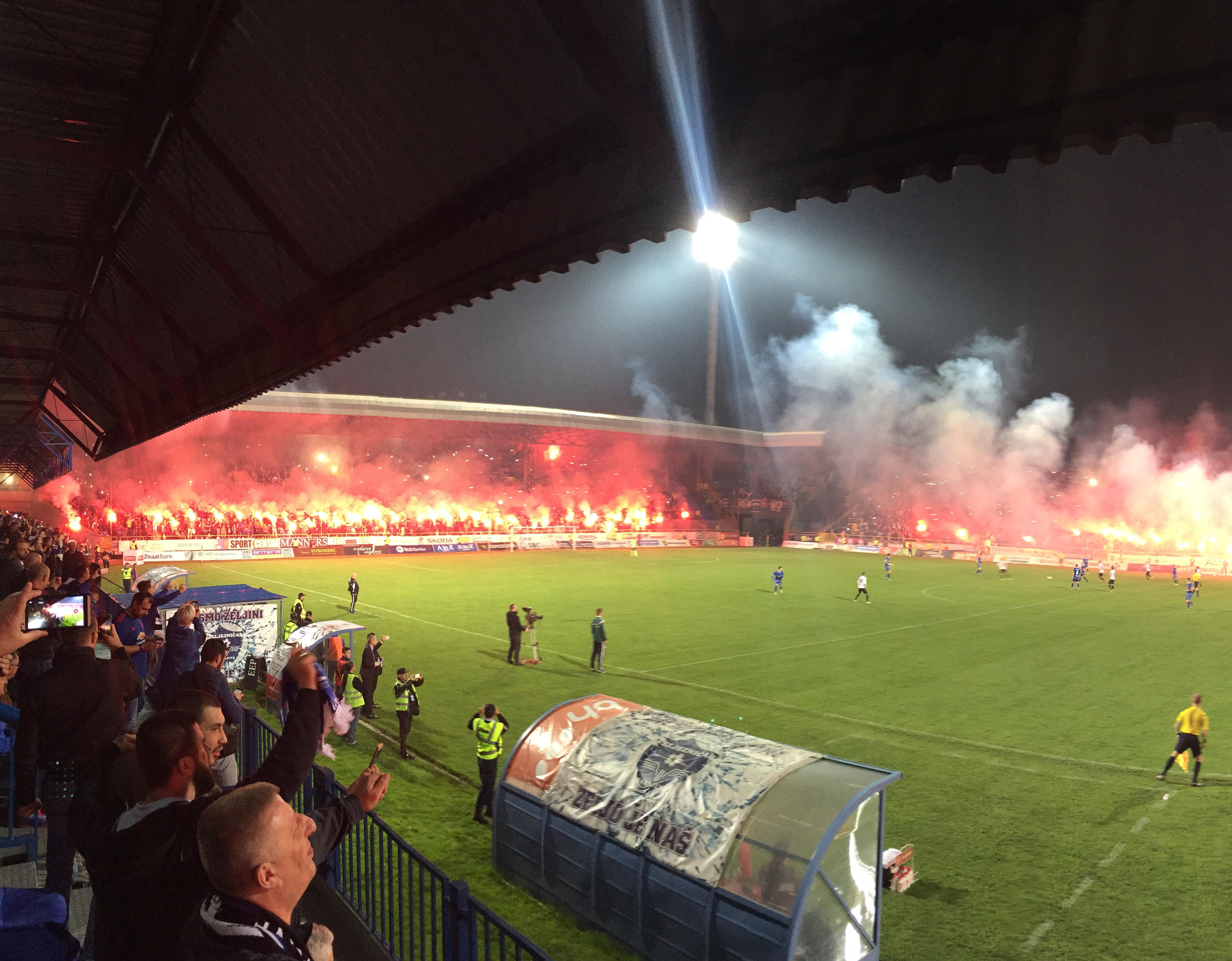
Club supporters

For the next years Maniacs become one of the famous supporter groups in country. They followed Zeljo in Belgrade, Zagreb, Ljubljana and other cities across Yugoslavia.

In the 1980s and early 1990s, fans identified with Yugoslavia.

After the breakup of Yugoslavia and when the Bosnian War started, Grbavica a quarter of the city of Sarajevo where Grbavica Stadium is located was on the front lines of the battles between Bosnian army and Bosnian Serbs forces. Many members of The Maniacs joined Army of the Republic of Bosnia and Herzegovina and Zelene beretke. One of them was Dževad Begić-Đilda. He was one of the founders and a leader of The Maniacs. Đilda was killed 1992 by a sniper shot while he was trying to save a wounded civilian. Đilda played a significant role in the forming of the group, and his name can be heard on the stadium even to this day.

The most important day of every Maniac is 2nd of May 1996. 2nd of May 1996 is when Željezničar played their first match on Grbavica Stadium after the Bosnian war, the stadium was rebuilt because of heavy structural damage (the west stand was completely demolished and burned in war). That day in, front of 20 000 Sarajevans FK Željezničar Sarajevo played against FK Sarajevo. The game ended in a draw 1:1.

== Maniacs Mar del Plata ==
There is a group of Maniacs in an Argentinian city called Mar del Plata. Their leader Marcelo Torre's love for the Boca Juniors began when he met other Željo fans, including a girl from Sarajevo. Torre has visited Grbavica Stadium many times and when he went home for the first time he brought seven FK Željezničar jerseys with him to give to his friends.

Currently Maniacs Mar del Plata have eight members. The group is divided in fans of Boca Juniors and River Plate but the love for FK Željezničar is the one that connects them all.

== Notable supporters ==
Željezničar had many famous supporters, some of them are:

- Mladen Vojičić Tifa – rock musician. His song "Grbavica" became an anthem of The Maniacs and FK Željezničar and the fans sing the song before every home game
- Davorin Popović – musician, frontman of the pop rock band Indexi
- Zdravko Čolić – pop singer
- Goran Bregović – recording artist, lead guitarist and founder of the rock band Bijelo Dugme
- Nele Karajlić – musician, composer, comedian, actor, writer, former member of Zabranjeno Pušenje and member of the Top lista nadrealista show
- Sejo Sexon – rock and roll musician, member of Zabranjeno Pušenje, they made a song called "Čuva Bog Želju svog" ("God protects His Željo") which is played before every home game
- Branko Đurić – actor, comedian, film director, musician and member of the Top lista nadrealista show. He and his band Bombaj Štampa made a song Željo to je moj tim (Željo is my team) that is played before every home game
- Zenit Đozić – actor, humorist, television producer and member of the Top lista nadrealista show
- Senad Bašić – actor
- Benjamin Filipović – film director
- Milan Pavlović – actor
- Željko Komšić – politician, current member of the Presidency of Bosnia and Herzegovina
- Gradimir Gojer – politician
- Alija Behmen – politician
- Nedžad Branković – politician
- Aleksandar Hemon – writer and essayist
- Miljenko Jergović – writer
- Zuko Džumhur – writer
- Edin Džeko – football player, began his career in Željezničar
- Miralem Pjanić – football player
- Haris Medunjanin – football player
- Ervin Zukanović – football player, began his career in Željezničar
- Ibrahim Šehić – football player, began his career in Željezničar
- Edin Višća – former player of Željezničar
- Ermin Zec – former player of Željezničar
- Ivica Osim – former player and manager of Željezničar
- Amar Osim – former player and manager of Željezničar
- Damir Džumhur – tennis player
- Mehmed Baždarević – former player of Željezničar, former manager of Bosnia and Herzegovina national football team
- Nihad Đedović – basketball player
- Almir Čehajić – talk show host and actor
- Enes Begović – pop-folk singer
- Nihad Alibegović – folk singer
