= Veselin Vlahović =

Montenegrin Serb soldier

Veselin Vlahović also known as "'Batko' or 'Smeće' " (in English: Garbage, Trash) or the "Monster of Grbavica" (born in 1969) is a Montenegrin Serb former paramilitary who was convicted of committing murder, rape, illegal detention and torture against Bosniaks and Croats in the Grbavica neighbourhood of Sarajevo during the Bosnian War.

== Criminal history ==
In Montenegro, Vlahović was imprisoned for three years for robbery and violence but escaped in 2001. Shortly after escaping from prison, Vlahović shot a man to death in a bar in Serbia, and was sentenced to 15 years in prison. He later lived in Spain on a Bulgarian passport where Vlahović was wanted for three armed robberies in Alicante province. On 2 March 2010, he was captured and later extradited to Bosnia and Herzegovina.

== Trial ==
Vlahović pleaded not guilty to the 56 charges against him, which included "murder, enslavement, rape, illegal detention, physical and psychological abuse". According to the prosecutor Vlahović "is indicted for the murders of 27 people, the rapes of 12, the disappearances of five persons and causing injuries to 41 victims" and that "the prosecution will call 105 witnesses". On 29 March 2013, he was sentenced to 45 years in prison by the Bosnian justice system for war crimes committed during 1992-95 Bosnian conflict; he was found guilty of more than sixty crimes of crimes against humanity, including rape, murder and torturing Croat and Bosniak civilians, one of the better known being Goran Čengić, a Yugoslav handball player.
