= Jelka Miličević =

Federal Minister of Finance
- In office 31 March 2015 – 28 April 2023
- Prime Minister: Fadil Novalić
- Preceded by: Ante Krajina
- Succeeded by: Toni Kraljević

Personal details
- Born: 10 September 1960 (age 66) Đakovo, PR Croatia, FPR Yugoslavia
- Party: Croatian Democratic Union
- Education: University of Mostar

Jelka Miličević (born 10 September 1960) is a Bosnian Croat politician who served as the Federal Minister of Finance from 2015 to 2023. She is a member of the Croatian Democratic Union.

== Early life and education ==
Miličević graduated from the School of Economics in Mostar in 1979, and from the Faculty of Economics in Mostar in 1983.

== Career ==
In the 1980s, Miličević worked, among others, at Soko Vazduhoplovna industrija d.d. Mostar, JAS d.o.o. Mostar, associate of the Expert Team for Privatization of the Federal Government (1996–1997), director of Soko Finance d.o.o. Mostar, Director of Internal Audit at Croatian Post d.d. Mostar, member of the Management Board of the Banking Agency of the Federation and president of the Audit Committee in Aluminij d.d. Mostar. Miličević is a certified internal auditor, specialised in banking and financial institutions.

A member of the Croatian Democratic Union of Bosnia and Herzegovina (HDZ BiH), in 2006, she pledged her property on bail so that her party leader, Dragan Čović, could be released from jail.

From 31 March 2015 until 28 April 2023, Miličević served as the Federal Minister of Finance in the government of Fadil Novalić.

== "Ventilators affair" corruption scandal ==
Fadil Novalić, Prime Minister of the Federation of Bosnia and Herzegovina, was detained for questioning and then arrested on 28 May 2020, for his role in illegal import of medical ventilators by "FH Srebrna malina", a raspberry processing firm recruited for that purpose by the Federal Department of Civil Protection.

100 ventilators were procured from China at a price of 10.5 million KM. The ventilators turned out to "not meet even a minimum of necessary characteristics for adequate treatment" of COVID-19 patients or for general use in intensive-care units.

Also arrested alongside Novalić were Miličević, suspended Director of the Federal Department for Civilian Protection Fahrudin Solak and the CEO and co-owner of the "FH Srebrna malina", Fikret Hodžić.

All four are under the investigation for associating for the purpose of committing a criminal offense, abuse of office, receiving a reward for trading in influence, money laundering and forgery or destruction of business documents and trade books.

== Other activities ==
- World Bank, Ex-Officio Alternate Member of the Board of Governors (since 2015)
- Multilateral Investment Guarantee Agency (MIGA), World Bank Group, Ex-Officio Alternate Member of the Board of Governors (since 2015)

Political offices
| Preceded by Ante Krajina | Federal Minister of Finance; 2015–2023 | Succeeded by Toni Kraljević |
