= Teacher strike of 2008 =

Teacher strike of 2008 may refer to:

- 2007–2008 Berlitz Japan strike
- 2008 Bellevue School District teacher strike
- 2008 National Union of Teachers strike
