= Nermin Nikšić =

Bosnian politician (born 1960)

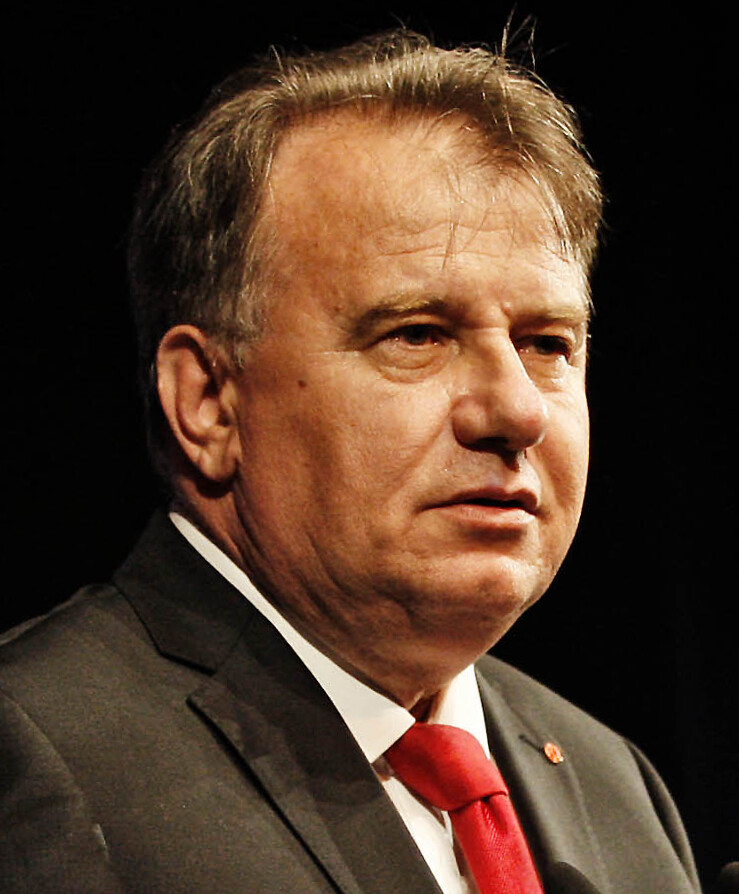
- Nikšić in 2018

Prime Minister of the Federation of Bosnia and Herzegovina
- Incumbent
- Assumed office 28 April 2023
- President: Lidija Bradara
- Preceded by: Fadil Novalić
- In office 17 March 2011 – 31 March 2015
- President: Živko Budimir; Marinko Čavara
- Preceded by: Mustafa Mujezinović
- Succeeded by: Fadil Novalić

President of the Social Democratic Party
- Incumbent
- Assumed office 7 December 2014
- Preceded by: Zlatko Lagumdžija
Parliamentary offices
Member of the House of Representatives
In office
6 December 2018 – 1 December 2022
Member of the Federal House of Representatives
In office
2 December 2014 – 27 November 2018
In office
27 February 2001 – 9 March 2011

Personal details
- Born: 27 December 1960 (age 65) Konjic, PR Bosnia and Herzegovina, FPR Yugoslavia
- Party: Social Democratic (since 1993)
- Spouse: Nadija Nikšić
- Children: 2
- Education: University of Mostar (LLB)

Military service
- Allegiance: Republic of Bosnia and Herzegovina
- Branch/service: Army of the Republic of Bosnia and Herzegovina
- Years of service: 1992–1995
- Battles/wars: Bosnian War

Nermin Nikšić (Bosnian: [nîkʃit͡ɕ]; born 27 December 1960) is a Bosnian politician serving as Prime Minister of the Federation of Bosnia and Herzegovina since April 2023, having previously served from 2011 to 2015. He has also served as president of the Social Democratic Party (SDP BiH) since 2014, and was a member of the national House of Representatives from 2018 to 2022 as well.

Born in Konjic in 1960, Nikšić holds a degree in law from the University of Mostar. Prior to the Bosnian War, he worked in Konjic as clerk of town planning, construction and housing, as well as communal services, marketing and catering inspecting. Nikšić was Head of the Inspection from 1990 until 1992.

In 2000, Nikšić was appointed deputy mayor of Konjic, but soon resigned following his election to the Federal House of Representatives. In March 2011, after a year-long government formation, he was appointed federal prime minister, serving until March 2015. Nikšić was elected to the national House of Representatives in the 2018 general election. In April 2023, following the 2022 general election, he once again became federal prime minister.

Nikšić joined the SDP BiH in 1993. In December 2014, he was elected as its president, following the resignation of Zlatko Lagumdžija.

== Early life and education ==
Nikšić was born on 27 December 1960 in Konjic. He attended elementary and high school in his birth town. He graduated from Faculty of Law of University of Mostar in 1986.

From 1988, Nikšić was employed in Konjic, where he worked as clerk of town planning, construction and housing, as well as communal services, marketing and catering inspecting. From 1990 until 1992, he was Head of the Inspection.

== Political career ==
In 1993, Nikšić joined the Social Democratic Party (SDP BiH). One year later, he became president of the SDP BiH in Konjic. During the Bosnian War, he served as assistant to the commander of the 7th Brigade for legal jobs and assistant to the commander of the 43rd Brigade for moral.

From 1995 until 1998, Nikšić was vice president of the executive committee of the Municipality of Konjic, and from 1998 until 2000 he was head of General Administration, Housing and Communal Services and Inspections. In 2000, he was appointed deputy mayor of Konjic, but soon resigned following the 2000 parliamentary election and his election to the Federal House of Representatives.

From 2002 to 2006, Nikšić was vice president of the SDP BiH club in parliament. In 2004, he became president of the SDP BiH in the Herzegovina-Neretva Canton. In November 2006, Nikšić was president of the SDP BiH parliamentary club. On 7 December 2014, he became president of the SDP BiH, succeeding Zlatko Lagumdžija.

On 17 March 2011, after a political crisis in Bosnia and Herzegovina, Nikšić was appointed Prime Minister of the Federation of Bosnia and Herzegovina. The political crisis occurred after the 2010 general election when major parties were unable to come to an agreement to form the new government. He served as federal prime minister until 31 March 2015. In the 2018 general election, Nikšić was elected to the national House of Representatives. He failed to get re-elected to the House of Representatives in the 2022 general election.

On 28 April 2023, following interventions by High Representative Christian Schmidt due to months of political deadlock after the 2022 general election, Nikšić succeeded Fadil Novalić to once again serve as federal prime minister. Nikšić pledged that economic reform, further infrastructure development and fight against corruption would be the main goals of his government.

== Controversies ==
=== Dispute of premiership ===
Former federal prime minister, Fadil Novalić, who Nikšić succeeded in April 2023 after Christian Schmidt's intervention, at first refused to concede the power, and continues contesting his forceable deposing as illegal and unconstitutional. Nikšić's appointment was also deemed unconstitutional by the opposition, but was afterwards accepted.

=== Controversial cabinet picks ===
Controversies abound around Nikšić's cabinet members too, some of whom, like the minister of culture and sports, openly support war criminals; others, like the interior minister, are convicted felons. In addition to numerous intellectuals, Bosnia and Herzegovina's prominent public figures who voiced their fierce opposition to Nikšić's vexed cabinet include film director Jasmila Žbanić, poet Abdulah Sidran, and film and stage actor Emir Hadžihafizbegović.

== Personal life ==
Nermin is married to Nadija Nikšić, and together they have two children, a daughter Najra and a son Haris.

Party political offices
Preceded by Zlatko Lagumdžija	President of the Social Democratic Party; 2014–present	Incumbent
Political offices
Preceded by Mustafa Mujezinović	Prime Minister of the Federation of Bosnia and Herzegovina; 2011–2015	Succeeded by Fadil Novalić
Preceded by Fadil Novalić	Prime Minister of the Federation of Bosnia and Herzegovina; 2023–present	Incumbent
