= Goran Čengić =

Yugoslav handball player

Personal information
- Born: 21 April 1946 Sarajevo, FPR Yugoslavia
- Died: 14 June 1992 (aged 46) Sarajevo, Bosnia and Herzegovina

Sport
- Sport: Handball
National team
- Years: Team
- –: Yugoslavia

Goran Čengić (21 April 1946 – 14 June 1992) was a Yugoslav handball player who played for RK Bosna Sarajevo, RK Mlada Bosna, RK Crvena zvezda and the Yugoslavia national handball team.

== Early life ==
He was born in Sarajevo, PR Bosnia and Herzegovina, FPR Yugoslavia in 1946 to Ferid "Fićo" (1910–1986) and Nataša (née Zimonjić).

Both of his parents were Yugoslav Partisans in World War II. His father, Ferid Čengić, served in Sarajevo's Partisan municipal committee and in the city council and later was mayor of Sarajevo from 1947 to 1948. His mother was a descendant of the old Serbian Orthodox family of Zimonjić from Herzegovina. The brother of his mother's grandfather was Orthodox bishop Petar Zimonjić, who was killed by Ustashe in 1941 and was later canonized by the Serbian Orthodox Church as a saint.

In 1963, at the age of 17, while playing for RK Bosna Sarajevo he helped win the Yugoslav Handball Cup. Čengić completed his studies at the Academy of Fine Arts at the University of Sarajevo.

== Death ==
Čengić was killed on Grbavica on 14 June 1992 by Veselin Vlahović, leaving is 4-years-old son Vladimir, after he tried to protect his Bosniak neighbor, Husnija Ćerimagić, who also died in the event. Nine years after his murder, Čengić's remains were found and interred in Sarajevo's Bare Cemetery. In 2006, RK Bosna Sarajevo began holding the Goran Čengić Memorial Tournament in his honor. In 2013, he was posthumously awarded the Duško Kondor Civil Courage Award. Former Croatian president Stjepan Mesić presented the award to Čengić's son Vladimir.

== Sources ==
- "Goran Čengić ubijen jer je spašavao komšiju Husniju". Dnevni avaz (in Serbo-Croatian). 8 March 2013. Archived from the original on 14 May 2013.
- Greble, Emily (2011). Sarajevo, 1941–1945: Muslims, Christians, and Jews in Hitler's Europe. Ithaca: Cornell University Press. ISBN 978-0-8014-4921-5.
- Đugum, Aida (10 February 2013). "Nagrade "Duško Kondor": Časni ljudi u nečasnom vremenu". Radio Free Europe / Radio Liberty (in Serbo-Croatian).
- "Junaci bez ulica: Goran Čengić". Radio Sarajevo (in Serbo-Croatian). 22 July 2011. Archived from the original on 14 May 2013.
- "Počast heroju Goranu Čengiću". Slobodna Bosna (in Serbo-Croatian). 8 March 2013.
