= FG Hemisphere =

American investment management firm based in New York City

FG Capital Management, Ltd.
- Company type: Public
- Industry: Investment management
- Headquarters: New York City, United States
- Area served: Worldwide
- Key people: Peter Grossman (Managing Director & Co-founder); Keith R. Fogerty (Co-founder)
- Products: Emerging markets
- Website: Official website

FG Capital Management, Ltd. is an American investment management firm based in New York City that focuses on equity investments and debt restructuring in emerging markets. As part of its management of distressed assets, FG Capital investigates and exposes financial fraud by engaging politicians, governments, and international organizations to combat corruption.

== FG Hemisphere Associates ==
FG Hemisphere Associates is a "special-purpose vehicle", managed by FG Capital, which purchases sovereign debt claims where countries rich in natural resources have too little revenue from these resources ending up in the national treasury. FG Hemisphere stated that "these countries were suffering from lack of proper management, not a lack of resources" while emphasizing "governance and transparency reforms will recapture this lost revenue for the public coffers."

== Sovereign debt ==
FG Capital Management sued the Democratic Republic of the Congo for $100 million after acquiring debts owed to Energoinvest for $2.6 million. Former Bosnian prime minister, Nedzad Brankovic, approved the deal and was investigated on corruption charges during his stint at EnergoInvest. Bosnian Police reported that Brankovic acted illegally in selling the debt, which was owned by the country, but sold personally, and recommended he be charged. A court in the Jersey Islands ruled that the DRC must pay FG Capital the debt in full plus interest, a claim of $108.3 million. In 2012, the ruling was overturned by the Privy Council of England, which blocked FG Capital from collecting on the debt.

== See also ==
- Asset management company
- Corporate governance
- Distressed securities
- Distressed securities fund
- List of asset management firms
