= Mustafa Mujezinović (politician) =

Bosnian politician (1954–2019)

Prime Minister of the Federation of Bosnia and Herzegovina
- In office 25 June 2009 – 17 March 2011
- President: Borjana Krišto
- Preceded by: Nedžad Branković; Vjekoslav Bevanda (acting)
- Succeeded by: Nermin Nikšić
Additional positions
Governor of Sarajevo Canton
In office 27 May 1998 – June 2000
Preceded by	Midhat Haračić
Succeeded by	Mirsad Kebo
Prime Minister of Sarajevo Canton
In office 30 October 1996 – 12 November 1998
Preceded by	Ševkija Okerić
Succeeded by	Beriz Belkić

Personal details
- Born: 27 December 1954 Sarajevo, PR Bosnia and Herzegovina, FPR Yugoslavia
- Died: 23 December 2019 (aged 64) Sarajevo, Bosnia and Herzegovina
- Party: Party of Democratic Action
- Education: University of Sarajevo (BS)

Mustafa Mujezinović (27 December 1954 – 23 December 2019) was a Bosnian politician and diplomat who served as Prime Minister of the Federation of Bosnia and Herzegovina from 2009 to 2011. He also served as Governor of Sarajevo Canton from 1998 to 2000, and previously as Prime Minister of Sarajevo Canton from 1996 to 1998.

A member of the Party of Democratic Action, Mujezinović served as Bosnia and Herzegovina's ambassador to the OSCE, as well as to Malaysia, the United Kingdom and Russia.

== Early life and education ==
Born in Sarajevo on 27 December 1954, Mujezinović finished elementary school in 1970, and high school in 1974. He graduated from the Faculty of Electrical Engineering at the University of Sarajevo in 1978.

== Early career ==
From 1978 to 1983, Mujezinović was a designer, and then an engineer of quality in the factory of transformers and distribution facilities TTS, Energoinvest in Sarajevo. From He then worked as a manager of technical sales group in the TTS factory until 1990. From 1990 until 1992, he was the factory's sales manager and member of the management board.

== Political career ==
Mujezinović was a member of the Party of Democratic Action. From 1994 to 1995, he was president of Sarajevo's Stari Grad municipality. He subsequently served as municipal mayor of Stari Grad from 1995 to 1996. Following the 1996 general election, he was appointed Prime Minister of Sarajevo Canton serving until November 1998. He also served as the Canton's governor from May 1998 until June 2000.

From 2000 to 2001, Mujezinović served as Bosnia and Herzegovina's ambassador to the Organization for Security and Co-operation in Europe (OSCE). From 2002 to 2004, he was director of the privatization fund "Prevent Invest". From 2004 to 2008, he served as ambassador of Bosnia and Herzegovina in Malaysia. In 2008, he became an adviser to the Board of the Development Bank of the Federation of Bosnia and Herzegovina, one of the two entities of Bosnia and Herzegovina. Following Nedžad Branković's resignation as Prime Minister of the Federation of Bosnia and Herzegovina in May 2009, Mujezinović was appointed Federal Prime Minister on 25 June 2009. He served until 17 March 2011.

Mujezinović then served as the Bosnia and Herzegovina ambassador to the United Kingdom from 2012 to 2015, and to Russia from 2016 until 2019.

== Death ==
Mujezinović died in Sarajevo on 23 December 2019, aged 64. He was buried in Sarajevo two days later, on 25 December.
