= Fadil Novalić =

Bosnian politician (born 1959)

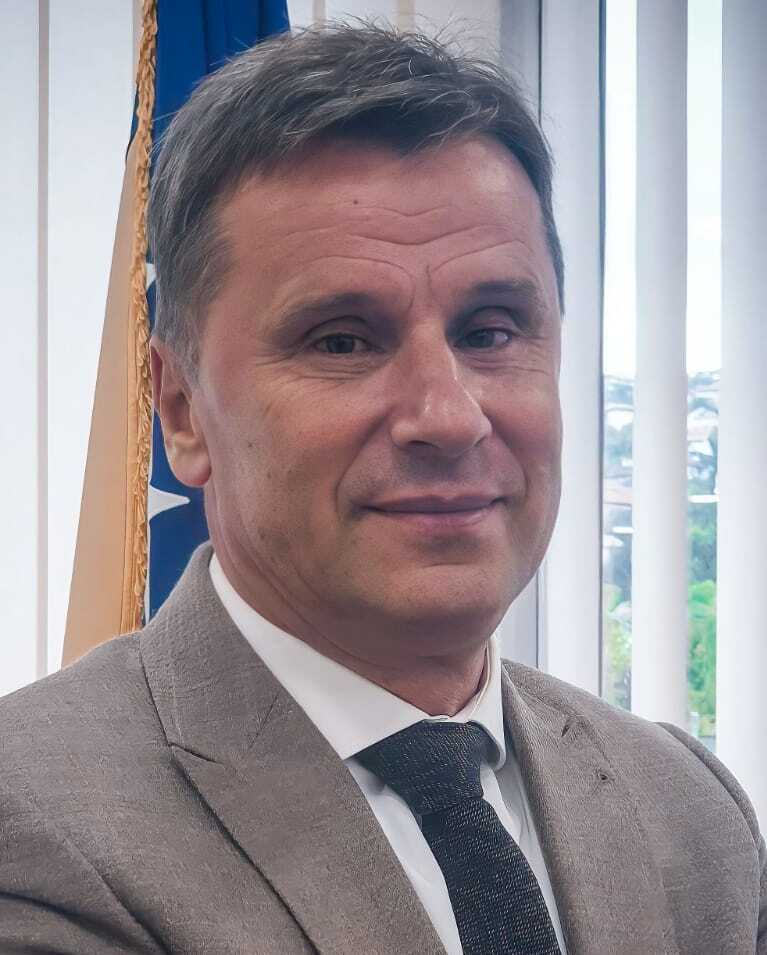
- Novalić in 2021

Prime Minister of the Federation of Bosnia and Herzegovina
- In office 31 March 2015 – 28 April 2023
- President: Marinko Čavara; Lidija Bradara
- Preceded by: Nermin Nikšić
- Succeeded by: Nermin Nikšić
Parliamentary offices
Member of the Federal House of Representatives
In office
28 April 2023 – 19 February 2024

Personal details
- Born: 25 September 1959 (age 67) Gradačac, PR Bosnia and Herzegovina, FPR Yugoslavia
- Party: Party of Democratic Action (2015–present)
- Spouse: Selvija Novalić
- Children: 3
- Education: University of Sarajevo (BE)
- Occupation: Politician
- Profession: Entrepreneur, mechanical engineer

Military service
- Allegiance: Republic of Bosnia and Herzegovina
- Branch/service: Army of the Republic of Bosnia and Herzegovina
- Years of service: 1992–1995
- Rank: Soldier
- Unit: 107th Gradačac brigade
- Battles/wars: Bosnian War

Fadil Novalić (born 25 September 1959) is a Bosnian politician who served as Prime Minister of the Federation of Bosnia and Herzegovina from 2015 to 2023. He also served as member of the Federal House of Representatives from 2023 to 2024. Having served for over eight years, he is the longest-serving federal prime minister.

Novalić graduated from the University of Sarajevo in 1983. He then worked for a number of years in the company TMD "Gradačac Famos", going from constructor to director. Later he moved on to head the company TMD "Automotive Industry" ("Cimos" TMD). Novalić was dismissed from Cimos in 2013 for alleged abuse of powers. He also chaired the Association of Businessmen of Gradačac and hometown football club Zvijezda Gradačac.

Following the 2014 general election, Novalić was appointed federal prime minister in March 2015, as a member of the Party of Democratic Action. He remained in office after the 2018 general election. As federal prime minister, he was one of the high-ranking officials that led Bosnia and Herzegovina's response to the COVID-19 pandemic. Novalić was succeeded by Nermin Nikšić as federal prime minister in April 2023, following the 2022 general election.

In May 2020, Novalić was accused of being involved in the "Ventilators affair" scandal, regarding his role in the "illegal import" of medical ventilators during his time as prime minister. In April 2023, he was found guilty in the first instance, receiving four years imprisonment. The court's Appellate panel confirmed the verdict in January 2024, and Novalić started serving his sentence in March.

== Early career ==
Novalić is an entrepreneur and a mechanical engineer by profession. He is credited for reviving the automotive industry in his hometown of Gradačac after serving in the Army of the Republic of Bosnia and Herzegovina during the Bosnian War. While Novalić was a soldier of the 107th Gradačac brigade during the war, he lost two fingers.

Novalić graduated from the Faculty of Mechanical Engineering at the University of Sarajevo in 1983. He then worked for 17 years in the company TMD "Gradačac Famos", going from constructor to director. In 2000, he moved on to head the company TMD "Automotive Industry" ("Cimos" TMD). Novalić was dismissed from Cimos in 2013 for alleged abuse of powers, despite protests by employees in his support. He also founded at least seven other companies, including "Supfina". He was on the supervisory boards of the companies "Wagner - Automotive" and "Namještaj" d.d. Novalić also chaired the Association of Businessmen of Gradačac and football club Zvijezda Gradačac.

He has been a member of the Party of Democratic Action (SDA) since 2015, and has even before been the chairman of the Board of the Council for Economic and Financial Policy of the Party. Novalić has been a member of the SDA Presidency also since 2015. He has authored much of the SDA's economic programme.

== Federal Prime Minister (2015–2023) ==
In March 2015, Novalić was appointed by the SDA to head the government of the Federation of Bosnia and Herzegovina entity, in coalition with the Croatian Democratic Union. He remained in office after the 2018 general election, due to the political parties in the Federation failing to form a new government.

=== Environmental activism ===
Novalić stood up against the proliferation of small hydroelectric dams in the Federation of Bosnia and Herzegovina, which has some of the most biodiverse rivers in Europe.

His stance - that clean rivers are more important than domestic electricity production - made him a notable figure in the world of environmental activism in 2020, when prominent American actor Leonardo DiCaprio referenced his call to action while urging the Federal Government to protect the most biodiverse rivers remaining in Europe himself.

=== Contesting deposing by Christian Schmidt ===
On 28 April 2023, after months of political deadlock in the formation of a new Federal Government, following the 2022 general election, Christian Schmidt intervened in his role of High Representative for Bosnia and Herzegovina by suspending the Constitution for twenty-four hours, with Social Democratic Party president Nermin Nikšić getting appointed as the new Prime Minister. At the same time, Novalić refused to concede the power and continues contesting his forceable deposing as "illegal and unconstitutional."

== Controversies ==
=== Defense industry ===
Novalić stirred controversy after announcing the results of his government's success at reviving the Federal defense industry, among which was the increased range of Bosnian grenades. Bakir Izetbegović, the president of the SDA which appointed Novalić, doubled down on the confidence asserting that weapons production will continue, both to increase exports and for the "God forbid, it comes to it" scenario of another aggression and attempted genocide. Bosnian Serb leader Milorad Dodik accused the Federation of “illegal weapon production” after these events.

=== Corruption allegations ===
Novalić was detained for questioning and then arrested on 28 May 2020, for his alleged role in "illegal import" of medical ventilators by "FH Srebrena malina", a raspberry processing firm recruited for that purpose by the Federal Department of Civil Protection. He also faced money laundering charges by the same indictment. 100 ventilators were acquired from a Chinese company at a price of 10.5 million KM. Gordana Tadić, at the time head of the Prosecutor's Office of Bosnia and Herzegovina, said in an interview given on Face TV that "Articles by news portals were the basis for the indictment."

Also arrested alongside Novalić were the Federal Minister of Finance Jelka Miličević, the suspended Director of the Federal Department for Civilian Protection Fahrudin Solak, and the CEO and co-owner of the "FH Srebrena malina", Fikret Hodžić. The indictment of Milićević was separated from the indictment of the others accused. On 5 April 2023, Novalić was found guilty by the first-instance court and received a four-year sentence, while Hodžić got five and Solak six-year sentences. The verdict was confirmed by the court's Appellate panel on 26 January 2024. Novalić started serving his sentence in Vojkovići prison on 21 March 2024.

== Personal life ==
Fadil is married to Selvija Novalić with whom he has three daughters.

On 13 July 2020, it was confirmed that he tested positive for COVID-19, amid its pandemic in Bosnia and Herzegovina; by 26 July, he recovered. On 25 August 2021, Novalić received his first dose of the Sinopharm BIBP COVID-19 vaccine.

Political offices
Preceded by Nermin Nikšić	Prime Minister of the Federation of Bosnia and Herzegovina; 2015–2023	Succeeded by Nermin Nikšić
