= Alija Behmen =

Bosnian politician (1940–2018)

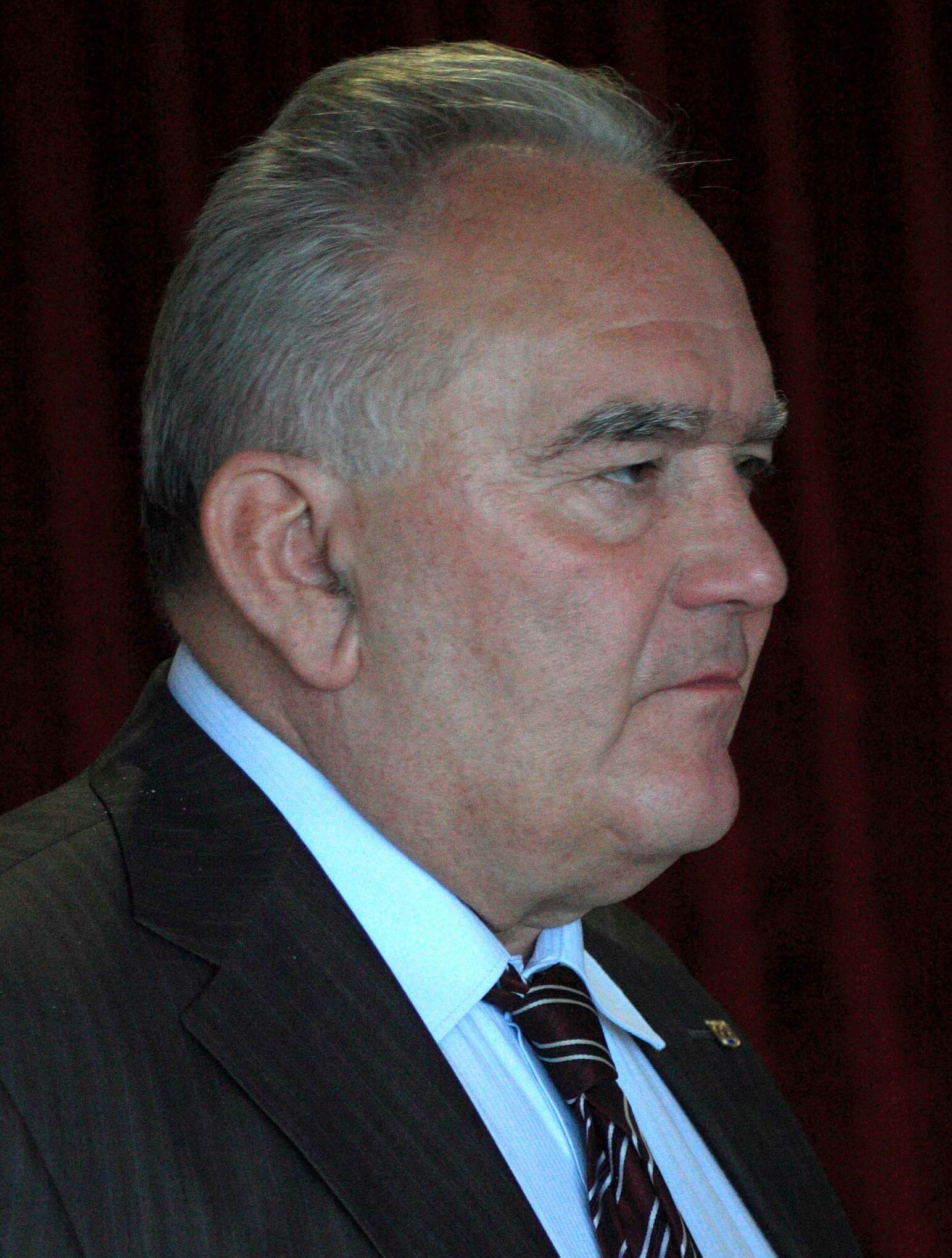
- Behmen in 2009

36th Mayor of Sarajevo
- In office 28 January 2009 – 27 March 2013
- Preceded by: Semiha Borovac
- Succeeded by: Ivo Komšić

Prime Minister of the Federation of Bosnia and Herzegovina
- In office 12 March 2001 – 14 February 2003
- Preceded by: Edhem Bičakčić; Dragan Čović (acting)
- Succeeded by: Ahmet Hadžipašić

Personal details
- Born: 25 December 1940 Split, Kingdom of Yugoslavia
- Died: 1 August 2018 (aged 77) Sarajevo, Bosnia and Herzegovina
- Party: Social Democratic Party
- Education: University of Sarajevo (BEc, MMR, PhD)

Alija Behmen (25 December 1940 – 1 August 2018) was a Bosnian politician who served as the 36th mayor of Sarajevo from 2009 to 2013. He also served as Prime Minister of the Federation of Bosnia and Herzegovina from 2001 to 2003. Behmen was a member of the Social Democratic Party.

== Early life and education ==
Behmen was born on 25 December 1940 in Split, Kingdom of Yugoslavia, present-day Croatia. He graduated in 1969 from the Faculty of Economics at the University of Sarajevo, where he later presented a doctoral dissertation in the field of modeling transport costs and their impact on the reproduction and development of the economy. In 1974, Behmen defended his master's degree in marketing. From 1970, he worked at the Institute of Economics in Sarajevo and at the Sarajevo State Technical University as responsible for technological and economic functions. He was also Deputy President and Chairman of the Management Board of the ŽTO Sarajevo.

From 1978 to 1980, Behmen chaired the PO Interšped Workers' Organization. He was then appointed Assistant Professor at the Faculty of Transport and Communications.

== Political career ==
In the 1998 general election, as a candidate of the Social Democratic Party, Behmen was elected member of the Sarajevo Cantonal Assembly and deputy chairman of the Federal House of Peoples.

From March 2001 until February 2003, he served as Prime Minister of the Federation of Bosnia and Herzegovina entity. At the end of 2001, six citizens of Algerian origin (the so-called "Algerian Six") were accused of planning a terrorist attack on the U.S. embassy in Sarajevo. They were taken into custody in October, and the Council of Ministers revoked their citizenship in November. After a 3-month-process, the Supreme Court of the Federation of Bosnia and Herzegovina ordered their release based on lack of evidence. According to documents filed by the detainee's American lawyers in their U.S. federal court habeas action, Christopher Hoh, the then U.S. chargé d'affaires, had told then Behmen that the U.S. would cut all diplomatic relations if the men were not arrested. Eventually, the Council of Ministers yielded to the demand, and the six were deported to Guantánamo Bay.

In the 2006 general election, Behmen was elected member of the Federal House of Representatives. He left the post in January 2009, after being appointed mayor of Sarajevo. Behmen served as mayor until March 2013.

== Death ==
On 1 August 2018, Behmen died in Sarajevo at the age of 77. He was buried in Sarajevo at the Bare Cemetery on 3 August, two days after his death.

Political offices
Preceded by Dragan Čović (Acting)	Prime Minister of the Federation of Bosnia and Herzegovina; 2001–2003	Succeeded by Ahmet Hadžipašić
Preceded by Semiha Borovac	Mayor of Sarajevo; 2009–2013	Succeeded by Ivo Komšić
