= Grbavica (song) =

1993/1997 song performed by Tifa

Song by Mladen Vojičić Tifa

from the album Grbavica
- Released: 1993/1997
- Recorded: 1993/1997
- Genre: Rock ballad, Football chant
- Songwriter: Dragan Jokić
- Composer: Mustafa Čizmić

"Grbavica" is a Bosnian patriotic song recorded by Bosnian rock vocalist Mladen Vojičić Tifa for his fourth studio album of the same name (1997). It was written by Dragan Jokić and composed by Mustafa Čizmić.

== Writing, composing and recordings ==
"Grbavica" was first recorded in 1993 by prominent Bosnian rock vocalist Mladen Vojičić Tifa, in Sarajevo under the siege, during the Bosnian War. After the war in 1997, following the song's huge popularity especially among Sarajevo residents, Tifa included Grbavica as the title song of his eponymous solo rock-album of the same name. The song also became the unofficial anthem for Sarajevo-based football club FK Željezničar Sarajevo, and the most popular chant amongst the club's main supporti group.

== Popularity and receptions ==
Željezničar's main support group, The Maniacs, and its many affiliate sub-groups, perform Grbavica before the kick-off in every game at home stadium Grbavica.

== Background ==
Grbavica is an urban neighborhood in the city of Sarajevo, across the Miljacka river which cuts through the city's longitudinally. During the period of the siege in the war, from 1992 until reintegration in 1996, the neighborhood saw heavy fighting, with all of its non-Serb population murdered or expelled, while its many urban parts with architectural and public landmarks, such as the iconic Hotel Bristol and Grbavica Stadium, ended being burnt or razed to the ground. The stadium, home-ground of FK Željezničar, was hit by numerous large caliber and incendiary ammunition and ordnance from Bosnian Serb forces positions with heavy artillery, getting eventually incinerated. After initially bombing its pitch, it was turned into the front line and laden with many land-mines by Serb militias.

== Lyrics ==
"Grbavica" lyrics in Bosnian and English.

Lyrics in Bosnian

Hej Grbavice, rano ljuta
Pritisla me teška tuga
Na trenutak i pomislim
Da si sada neka druga.

Hej Grbavice, bolna si mi
Iz daleka gledam ulice tvoje
Tamo su slike djetinjstva moga
Tamo je sve što je moje

Ko život cijeli Miljacka dijeli
Mene od krila tvog
I ne znam kad ću al' znam da ću
Doći do doma svog

A onda Željin, stadion gledam
Vidim ponos tvoj
Život ću dati, al' tebe ne dam
Jer ti si život moj

Ne budi tužna kad čuješ pjesmu
Bol što naša srca mori
Jer svaki od nas što pjesmu pjeva
Do zadnjeg se za tebe bori

Zbog toga bola kad sa Bristola
Na tebe gledamo
Zbog ove pjesme, nazad se ne sm'je
Nikom te ne damo

English translation

Hey, Grbavica, open wound
A heavy sadness presses me down
For a moment I presume
That you're different now.

Hey, Grbavica, you're ailing
At your streets I gaze from afar
Where I left my childhood pictures
All is left there that is mine.

Whole my life, the Miljacka splits apart
Me from your lap
And I don't know when, but I know that,
I will come to my home.

And then I gaze at stadium Željo's
I behold your pride
I'll lay down my life, but never give up on you
For my life is you.

Don't be sad when you hear a song
The pain that slays our heart
Because each of us sings the song
Fights for you to the last.

For that pain, when from Bristol
We gaze upon you
For this song, there is no going back
We won't give you up to no one.

== See also ==
- FK Željezničar Sarajevo
- Grbavica
- Grbavica Stadium
- The Maniacs
