= Nedžad Branković =

Bosnian politician

Prime Minister of the Federation of Bosnia and Herzegovina
- In office 30 March 2007 – 27 May 2009
- President: Borjana Krišto
- Preceded by: Ahmet Hadžipašić
- Succeeded by: Vjekoslav Bevanda (acting); Mustafa Mujezinović

Federal Minister of Traffic and Communication
- In office 14 February 2003 – 30 March 2007
- Prime Minister: Ahmet Hadžipašić
- Preceded by: Besim Mehmedić
- Succeeded by: Nail Šećkanović

Personal details
- Born: 28 December 1962 (age 63) Višegrad, PR Bosnia and Herzegovina, FPR Yugoslavia
- Party: Party of Democratic Action (1990–present)
- Spouse: Suada Branković
- Children: 2
- Education: University of Sarajevo

Nedžad Branković (born 28 December 1962) is a Bosnian politician who served as Prime Minister of the Federation of Bosnia and Herzegovina from 2007 to 2009. He previously served as Federal Minister of Traffic and Communication from 2003 to 2007.

Branković is a member of the Party of Democratic Action. Appointed Federal Prime Minister in March 2007, he resigned in May 2009.

== Early life and education ==
Branković was born in Višegrad on 28 December 1962. He graduated in civil engineering from the University of Sarajevo in 1987, after which he worked for the Institute for Transport in Sarajevo. He served in the Army of the Republic of Bosnia and Herzegovina from 1992 to 1993 during the Bosnian War, being awarded the Golden Lily.

From 1993, Branković served as director-general of the Railways of Bosnia and Herzegovina public company. In 1998, he was appointed general manager of Energoinvest. In 1999, he also obtained a master's degree from the Faculty of Transport and Communications of the University of Sarajevo. Branković obtained his PhD from the University of Sarajevo in 2006, where he became a senior assistant lecturer.

== Political career ==
A member of the Party of Democratic Action, Branković was appointed Federal Minister of Traffic and Communication in the government of Ahmet Hadžipašić on 14 February 2003. He served until 30 March 2007. Branković would stay in government, becoming Federal Prime Minister on 30 March 2007. He was forced to resign on 27 May 2009, following a scandal concerning undue access to public housing.

Branković was also president of Sarajevo-based football club Željezničar, as well as being a member of the Olympic Committee of Bosnia and Herzegovina.

== Controversies ==
The Center for Investigative Reporting looked at how Branković was able to earn a practically free apartment from the Bosnian government. They also chronicled his conflicts of interest in his ownership of a privatization fund management firm.

Branković has also been condemned for selling debts owed to Bosnia and Herzegovina by the Democratic Republic of the Congo to the company FG Hemisphere. Bosnian police claimed Branković acted illegally in selling the debt, which was owned by the country, but sold personally, and recommended he be charged. No charges were ever brought.
