= Isaac Lipschits =

Dutch historian and political scientist

Isaac Lipschits (born in Rotterdam on 19 November 1930; died in Groningen on 24 May 2008) was a Dutch-Jewish historian and political scientist. He survived World War II by hiding from the Nazis and their collaborators. He published many books from 1962 to 2008.

== Books ==
- 1962: La politique de la France au Levant 1939-1941 (thesis)
- 1966: Honderd jaar NIW: het Nieuw Israëlietisch Weekblad, 1865–1965
- 1967: Het kapitaal: kritiek van de politieke economie; Dl.1: Het productieproces van het kapitaal
- 1971: Simulaties in de internationale politiek
- 1977: Politieke stromingen in Nederland: inleiding tot de geschiedenis van de Nederlandse politieke partijen
- 1977: Ontstaansgeschiedenis van de Nederlandse politieke partijen
- 1977 and onward: Verkiezingsprogramma's 1977, 1981, 1986, 1989, 1994, 1998: verkiezingen voor de Tweede Kamer der Staten-Generaal
- 1992: Onbestelbaar: herinneringen in briefvorm
- 1997: Tsedaka: een halve eeuw Joods Maatschappelijk Werk in Nederland
- 2001: De kleine sjoa: Joden in naoorlogs Nederland
- 2004: Rafael Gerstenfeld. 1900-1976: een man van goede daden
- 2008: Onbestelbaar: herinneringen in briefvorm gratis
