= List of prime ministers of the Federation of Bosnia and Herzegovina =

Prime Minister of the Federation of Bosnia and Herzegovina
- Premijer Federacije Bosne i Hercegovine
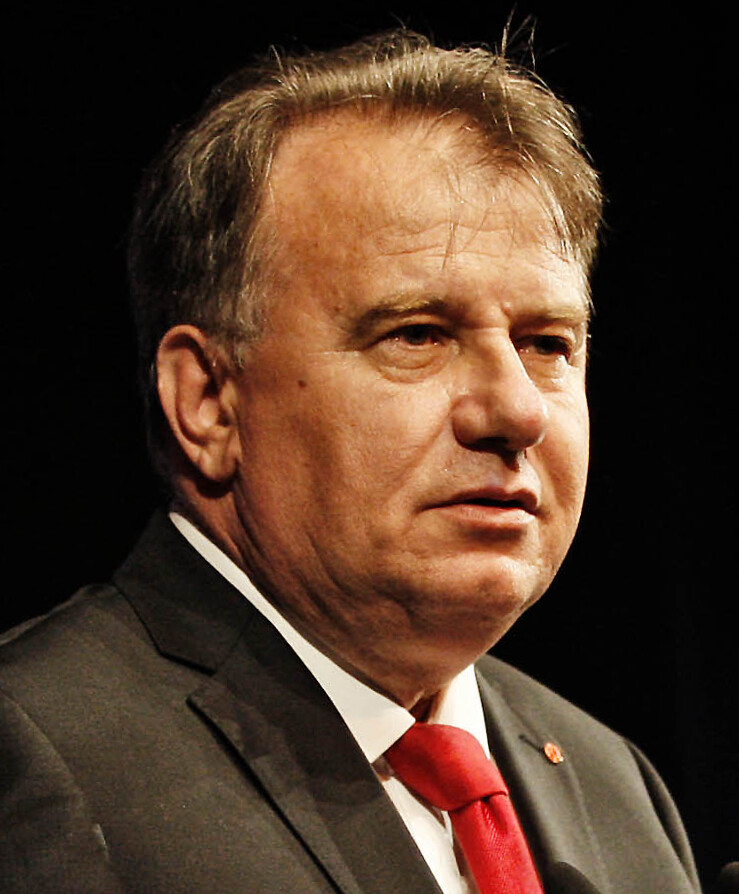
- Incumbent; Nermin Nikšić since 28 April 2023
- Nominator: President of the Federation of Bosnia and Herzegovina
- Appointer: Parliament of the Federation of Bosnia and Herzegovina
- Inaugural holder: Haris Silajdžić
- Formation: 31 May 1994

This article lists the prime ministers of the Federation of Bosnia and Herzegovina, the head of the Government of the Federation of Bosnia and Herzegovina.

The prime minister is nominated by the President of the Federation of Bosnia and Herzegovina, and appointed by the Parliament of the Federation of Bosnia and Herzegovina. As head of the government, the prime minister has no authority for appointing ministers, and his role is that of a coordinator. Ministers are appointed in their stead by the majority-parties according to ethnic and entity representation rules, so that a deputy minister must not be of same ethnicity as the respective minister.

Nermin Nikšić is the 8th and current prime minister of the Federation of Bosnia and Herzegovina. He took office on 28 April 2023, following the 2022 general election.

== Responsibilities ==
The prime minister represents the Federal Government and is responsible for:

- implementing the policy and enforcing the laws of the Federal Government, including ensuring the enforcement of the decisions of the courts of the Federation of Bosnia and Herzegovina;
- proposing the removal of the Federal President, in accordance with Article IV B.3. (2) of the Constitution of the Federation of Bosnia and Herzegovina;
- proposing and giving recommendations in the field of legislation;
- preparing a budget proposal for the Federal Parliament.

== List of officeholders ==
Party of Democratic Action Croatian Democratic Union Social Democratic Party

No.	Portrait	Name (Birth–Death)	Ethnicity	Term of office			Party	Composition	Election
No.	Portrait	Name (Birth–Death)	Ethnicity	Took office	Left office	Time in office	Party	Composition	Election
1		Haris Silajdžić (born 1945)	Bosniak	31 May 1994	31 January 1996	1 year, 245 days	SDA	SDA–HDZ BiH	—
2		Izudin Kapetanović (born 1953)	Bosniak	31 January 1996	18 December 1996	322 days	SDA	SDA–HDZ BiH	—
3		Edhem Bičakčić (born 1952)	Bosniak	18 December 1996	12 December 1998	4 years, 23 days	SDA	SDA–HDZ BiH–SBiH	1996
3		Edhem Bičakčić (born 1952)	Bosniak	12 December 1998	10 January 2001 (Note: Resigned from office)	4 years, 23 days	SDA	SDA–HDZ BiH–SBiH	1998
—		Dragan Čović (born 1956); Acting	Croat	10 January 2001	12 March 2001	61 days	HDZ BiH	SDA–HDZ BiH–SBiH	—
4		Alija Behmen (1940–2018)	Bosniak	12 March 2001	14 February 2003	1 year, 339 days	SDP BiH	SDP BiH–SBiH–NHI–BPS–NSRzB	2000
5		Ahmet Hadžipašić (1952–2008)	Bosniak	14 February 2003	30 March 2007	4 years, 44 days	SDA	SDA–SBiH–HDZ BiH	2002
6		Nedžad Branković (born 1962)	Bosniak	30 March 2007	27 May 2009	2 years, 58 days	SDA	SDA–SBiH–HDZ BiH–HDZ 1990–SNSD	2006
—		Vjekoslav Bevanda (born 1956); Acting	Croat	27 May 2009	25 June 2009	29 days	HDZ BiH	SDA–SBiH–HDZ BiH–HDZ 1990–SNSD	—
7		Mustafa Mujezinović (1954–2019)	Bosniak	25 June 2009	17 March 2011	1 year, 265 days	SDA	SDA–SBiH–HDZ BiH–HDZ 1990–SNSD	—
8		Nermin Nikšić (born 1960)	Bosniak	17 March 2011	31 March 2015	4 years, 14 days	SDP BiH	SDP BiH–SDA–NSRzB–HSP BiH	2010
9		Fadil Novalić (born 1959)	Bosniak	31 March 2015	28 April 2023	8 years, 28 days	SDA	SDA–SBB–HDZ BiH	2014
9		Fadil Novalić (born 1959)	Bosniak	31 March 2015	28 April 2023	8 years, 28 days	SDA	SDA–SBB–HDZ BiH	2018
(8)		Nermin Nikšić (born 1960)	Bosniak	28 April 2023	Incumbent	3 years, 132 days	SDP BiH	SDP BiH–HDZ BiH–NiP–NS–HDZ 1990–SN	2022

== See also ==
- List of presidents of the Federation of Bosnia and Herzegovina
