= 2008 in LGBTQ rights =

This is a list of notable events in the history of LGBTQ rights that took place in the year 2008.

== Events ==
=== January ===
- 1 – Civil unions begin in Uruguay and in the U.S. state of New Hampshire.

=== February ===
- 4 – Domestic partnerships begin in U.S. state of Oregon, after a court decides that it does not conflict with the state constitution, which forbids same-sex marriage.

=== March ===
- 1 – Both Nicaragua and Panama legalize homosexuality, with an equal age of consent, under a new penal code coming into effect.
- 12 – U.S. state of Washington expands its domestic partner legislation to give over 150 additional rights of marriage to same-sex couples.
- 14 – A bill to allow registered partnerships passes in the Australian state of Victoria by a vote of 58–21. The act becomes effective December 1.

=== May ===
- 6 – The Michigan Supreme Court rules that the state's constitutional ban on same-sex marriage also bars public sector employees from offering domestic partnership benefits.
- 11 – The Australian Capital Territory legalizes civil partnerships by a vote of 11–2. The act takes effect May 19.
- 14 – The Council of Europe's commissioner for human rights publishes his viewpoint on applying human right principles to sexual orientation and gender identity.
- 15 – The California Supreme Court strikes down the state's ban on same-sex marriage, with marriages to be available in June.
- 21 – In Witt v. Department of the Air Force the United States Court of Appeals for the Ninth Circuit rules that "don't ask, don't tell" constitutes an "[attempt] to intrude upon the personal and private lives of homosexuals" and under Lawrence v. Texas it is subject to heightened scrutiny, meaning that the government "must advance an important governmental interest, the intrusion must significantly further that interest, and the intrusion must be necessary to further that interest."

=== June ===
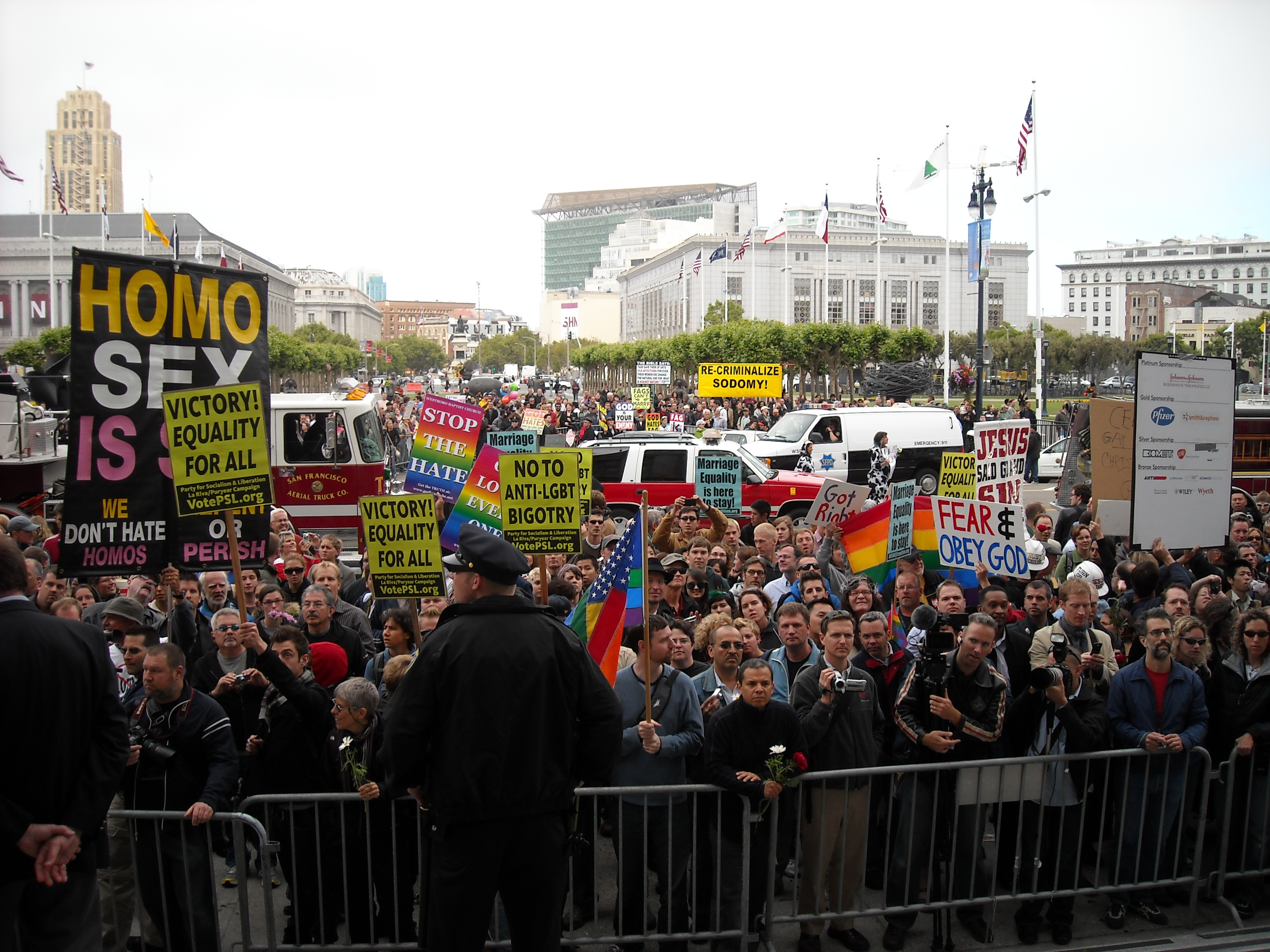
Scene outside San Francisco City Hall, June 16

- Same-sex marriage begins in California
- 11 – Same-sex marriage legalized in Norway by a vote of 81–42, taking effect January 1, 2009.

=== July ===
- 9 – The United States Court of Appeals for the First Circuit in Thomas Cook v. Robert Gates upholds the constitutionality of the U.S. military's "Don't ask, Don't tell" policy that bans gays and lesbians from serving openly in the U.S. armed forces.
- 31 – The Australian Capital Territory will be the first place in Australia to provide same-sex partners who are parents with "parental leave" under the Parental Leave Legislation Amendment Act 2008.

=== August ===
- 19 – Argentina approves the first nationwide gay rights measure, extending to same-sex couples the right to claim their deceased partners' pensions.
- 21 – The Coquille Indian Tribe in Oregon legalizes same-sex marriage. The state of Oregon does not recognize same-sex marriage but as a tribe recognized as a sovereign nation by the United States government the Coquille people are not bound by the state constitution.

=== September ===
- 30 – Ecuador legalizes same-sex civil unions with the passage of its new constitution, but simultaneously constitutionally bans marriage and adoption for same sex couples.

=== October ===
- 10 – Connecticut overturns a state ban on same-sex marriage and becomes the third U.S. state to legalize marriage for same-sex couples, following Massachusetts and California.

=== November ===
- 4
  - California voters ban same-sex marriage with Proposition 8, becoming the first U.S. state to do so after marriages had been legalized for same-sex couples. The amendment to California's constitution passed by a margin of 52% to 47% and overturned the state supreme court's ruling in May in favor of same-sex marriage.
  - Arkansas voters pass Act 1, which effectively bans adoption by same-sex couples, by a margin of 54% to 41%.
  - Arizona and Florida voters pass constitutional amendments banning same-sex marriage.
- 5 – Strauss v. Horton, a legal challenge to Proposition 8, is filed.
- 20 – The Supreme Court of California agrees to hear arguments for a possible overturn of Proposition 8.
- 24 – A lower court in the U.S. state of Florida declares that the state's ban on adoption by gay couples is unconstitutional.
- 26 – In Geldenhuys v National Director of Public Prosecutions the Constitutional Court of South Africa rules that an inequality between the ages of consent for heterosexual and homosexual intercourse is unconstitutional. Parliament equalised the age of consent by statute in 2007, but the court's ruling had retroactive effect, applying from the adoption of the Interim Constitution in 1994.

=== December ===
- 15 – The Constitutional Court of Hungary declares a previously passed registered partnership law—which would be available to both opposite-sex and same-sex couples—unconstitutional, on grounds that it duplicated the institution of marriage for opposite-sex couples. The court ruled that a registered partnership law that only included same-sex couples would be constitutional, and opined that the legislature had a duty to introduce such a law. Prime Minister Ferenc Gyurcsány instructed the Minister of Justice to prepare a new bill that would conform to the Court's decision.
- 23 – The Hungarian government announces that it will propose a new registered partnership law in line with the Constitutional Court's decision, to be presented to the parliament as early as February 2009.
- 30 – The ACLU sues the state of Arkansas, arguing that the state ban of same-sex adoptions is unconstitutional.

== Deaths ==
- January 27 — Alan G. Rogers, 40, American Army major, first publicly openly gay combat fatality of the Iraq War
- February 12 — Lawrence King, 15, American murder victim
- 22 May — Paul Patrick, 58, British LGBT rights activist
- August 2 — Michael Causer, 18, British murder victim
- August 19 — Leo Abse, 91, British politician, noted for reforming laws on homosexuality and divorce
- August 27 — Del Martin, 87, American LGBT rights activist, married in first wedding performed after California legalized same-sex marriage in 2008
- September 14 — John Burnside, 91, American LGBT rights activist and partner of Harry Hay
- September 26 — Paul Newman, 83, American actor and advocate of gay rights
- October 11 — Allan Spear, 71, American openly gay politician
- November 6 — Phil Reed, 59, American first openly gay African American New York City council member
- December 25 — Eartha Kitt, 81, American singer, actress, and advocate of gay rights

== See also ==
- Timeline of LGBTQ history — timeline of events from 12,000 BCE to present
- LGBTQ rights by country or territory — current legal status around the world
- LGBTQ social movements
