= Ahmet Hadžipašić =

Bosnian politician (1952–2008)

Prime Minister of the Federation of Bosnia and Herzegovina
- In office 14 February 2003 – 30 March 2007
- President: Niko Lozančić; Borjana Krišto
- Preceded by: Alija Behmen
- Succeeded by: Nedžad Branković

Personal details
- Born: 1 June 1952 Cazin, PR Bosnia and Herzegovina, FPR Yugoslavia
- Died: 23 July 2008 (aged 56) Zenica, Bosnia and Herzegovina
- Party: Party of Democratic Action
- Spouse: Branka Hadžipašić (m. 1974)
- Children: 3
- Education: University of Zenica

Ahmet Hadžipašić (1 June 1952 – 23 July 2008) was a Bosnian politician who served as Prime Minister of the Federation of Bosnia and Herzegovina from 2003 to 2007. He was a member of the Party of Democratic Action.

Born in Cazin, Hadžipašić got his PhD in 1990 at the University of Zenica. He lived in Zenica, a city known as the metallurgy center of the former SFR Yugoslavia. A few weeks before his death, Hadžipašić was elected vice-rector of the University of Zenica.

== Personal life ==
Ahmet was married to Branka Hadžipašić from 1974 until his death. Together, they had three daughters, Emina, Amra and Selma and, after his death, four grandchildren.

=== Death ===
Hadžipašić died from a heart attack on 23 July 2008 in his home in Zenica. The Guardian wrote in his obituary "As a newcomer to full-time politics, Hadžipašić, a chain-smoking "can-do" personality, appeared well-suited to the task of streamlining government finance, privatising state-run enterprises and attracting foreign investment."
