= Grbavica (Sarajevo) =

Neighbourhood in Sarajevo, Bosnia and Herzegovina

Grbavica Грбавица
- Neighbourhood
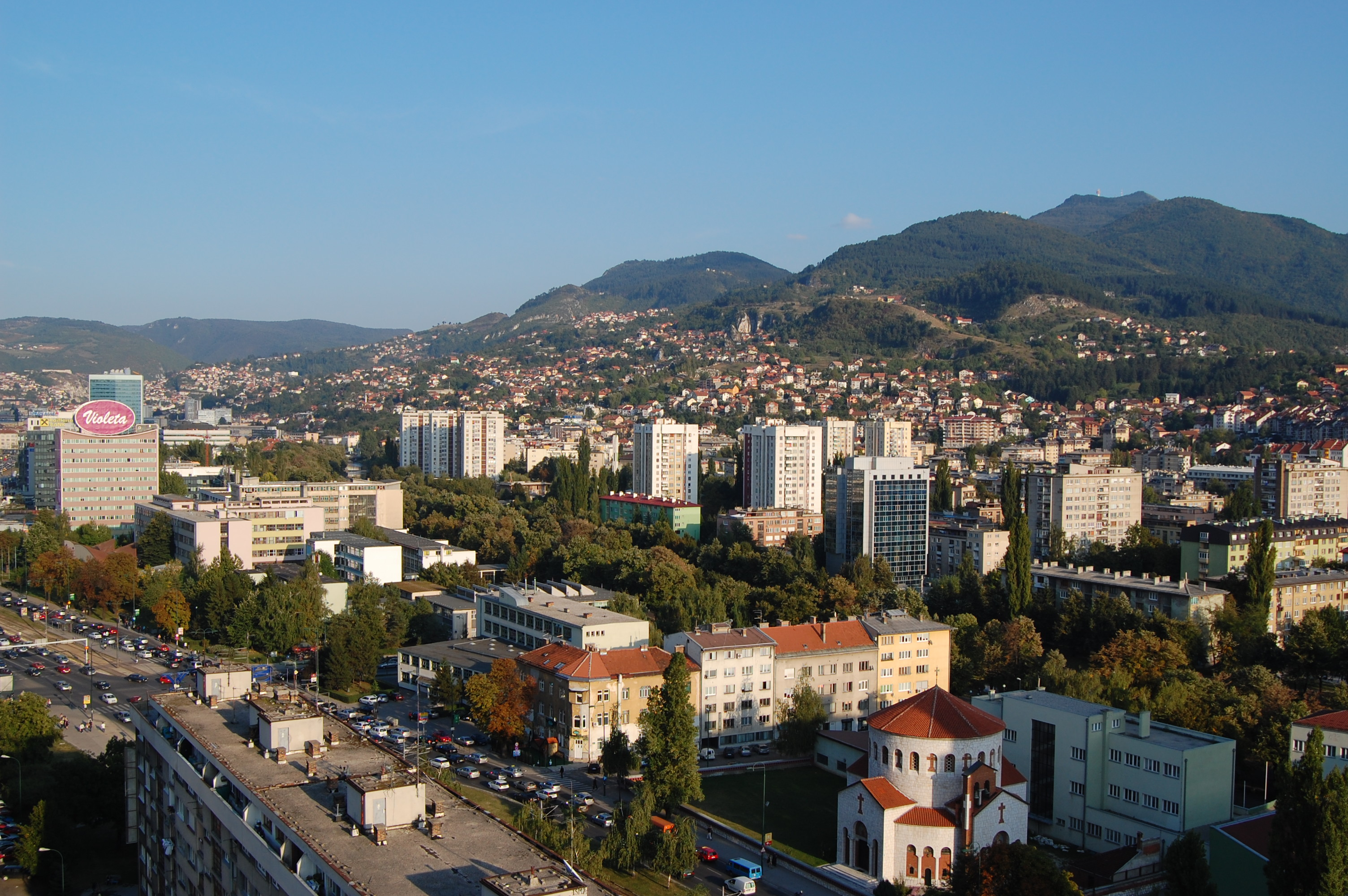
- Interactive map of Grbavica
- Coordinates: 43°51′1.95″N 18°23′39.01″E
- Country: Bosnia and Herzegovina
- Entity: Federation of Bosnia and Herzegovina
- Municipality: Novo Sarajevo

Population
  - Total: 12,657
- Time zone: UTC+1 (CET)
  - Summer (DST): UTC+2 (CEST)

Grbavica (Serbian Cyrillic: Грбавица) is a neighbourhood of the city of Sarajevo, Bosnia and Herzegovina. Today it is part of the municipality of Novo Sarajevo and administratively distinguished between Grbavica I and Grbavica II.

The area was developed as a new residential neighbourhood by the authorities of Socialist Yugoslavia, on the west bank of the Miljacka river.

== Features ==
Grbavica I, between Zagrebačka street and the Miljacka river, aside from residential buildings, hosts the Forestry Faculty of the University of Sarajevo (Šumarski Fakultet), the Kovačići Franciscan Monastery (Franjevački samostan), the Jordanian Mosque (Jordanska Džamija, 1996), three primary schools (OŠ Kovačići, OŠ Grbavica I and OŠ Grbavica II) and the Netherlands embassy. On its north-west corner, the new British Embassy Sarajevo has been built. Grbavica II, between Grbavica I and Hrasno, hosts the Grbavica Shopping Centre and the Ummu Arif Zabadne Mosque. South of Zagrebačka street are Grbavica Stadium, home of FK Željezničar, and the Catholic Church of St. Ignatius (Crkva Sv.Ignacija Lojolskog).

== In popular culture ==
- "Grbavica" – Mladen Vojičić Tifa (1997)
- Grbavica – a film released in 2006.

== Gallery ==
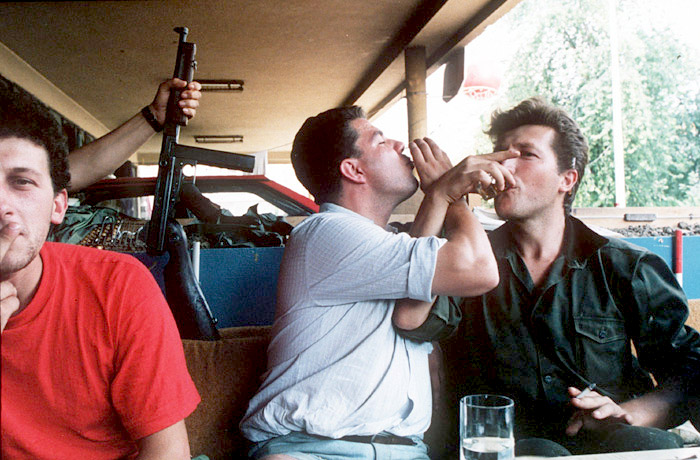
Serb soldiers toasting in occupied Grbavica, 1992

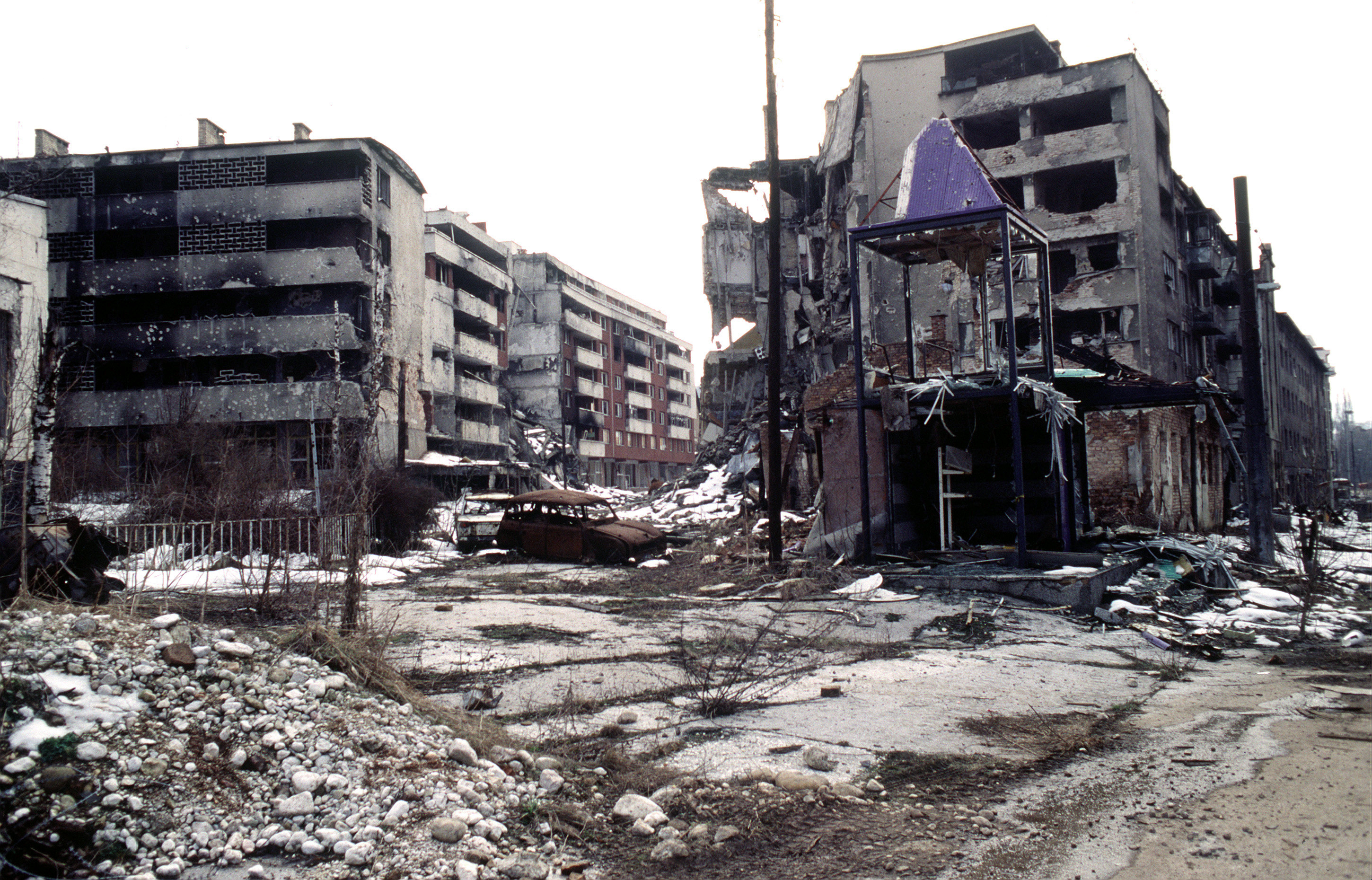
View of Grbavica, a neighbourhood of Sarajevo, after the war ended

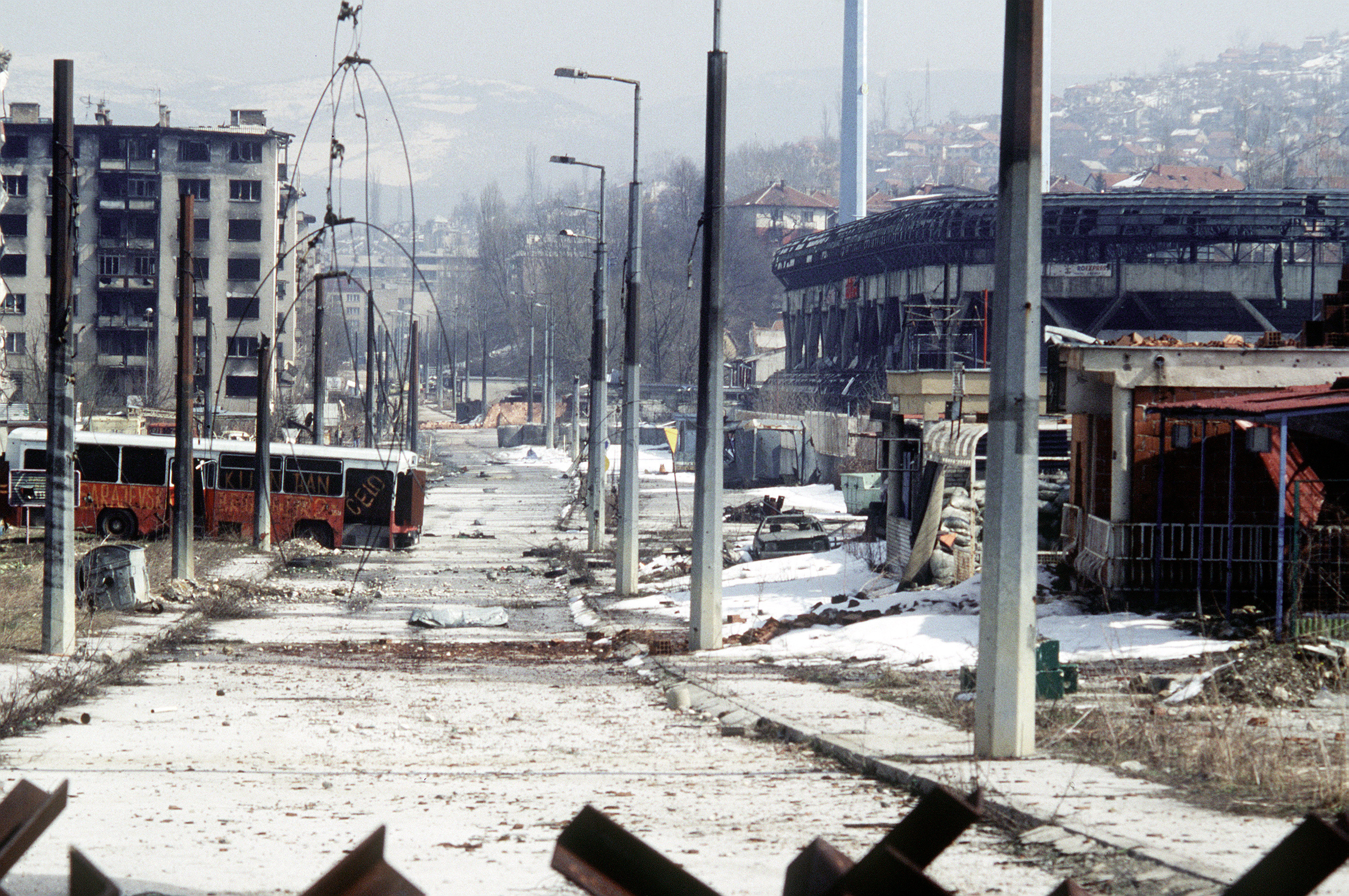
Downtown Grbavica in March 1996

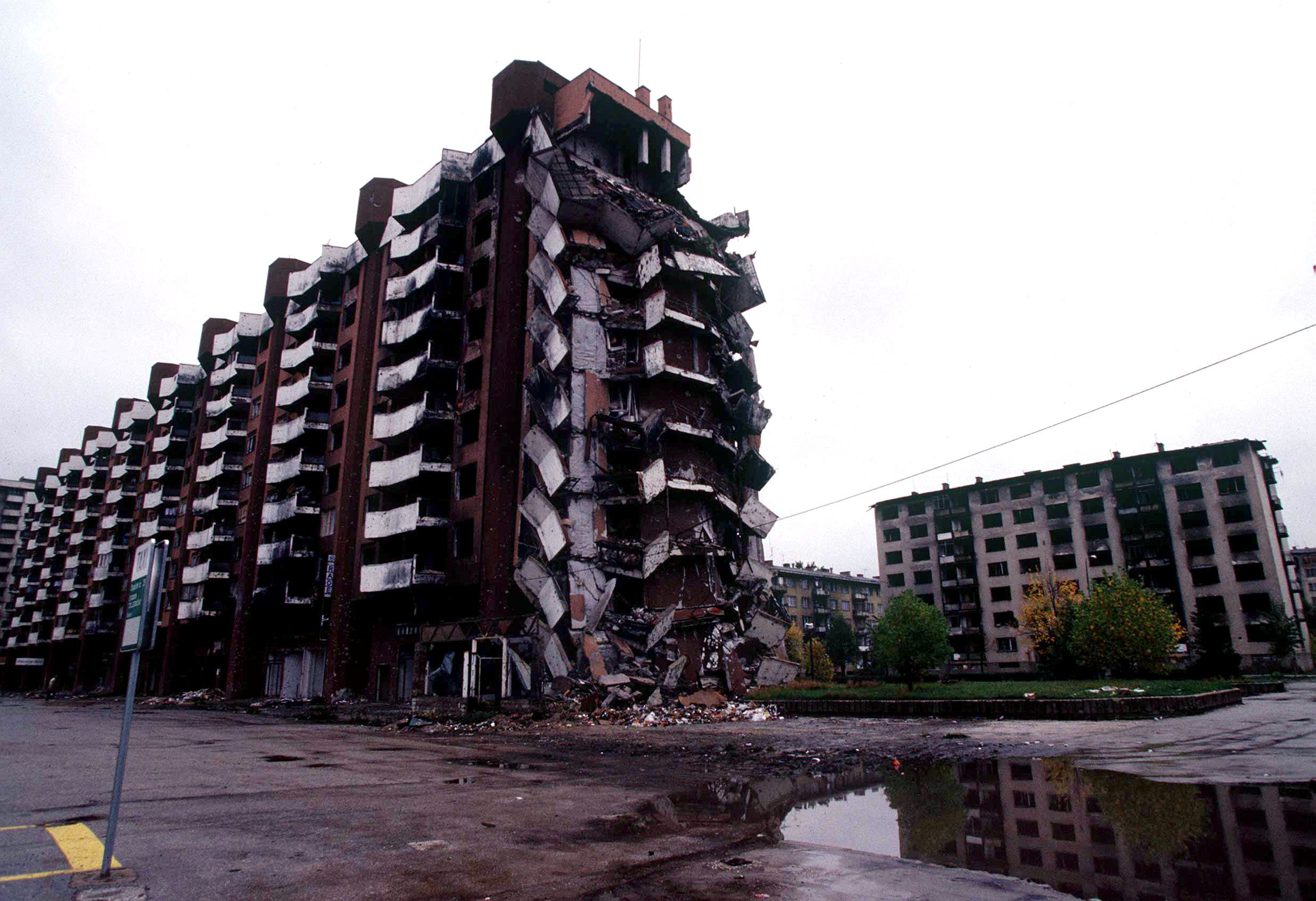
Destroyed residential buildings in Grbavica, 1996

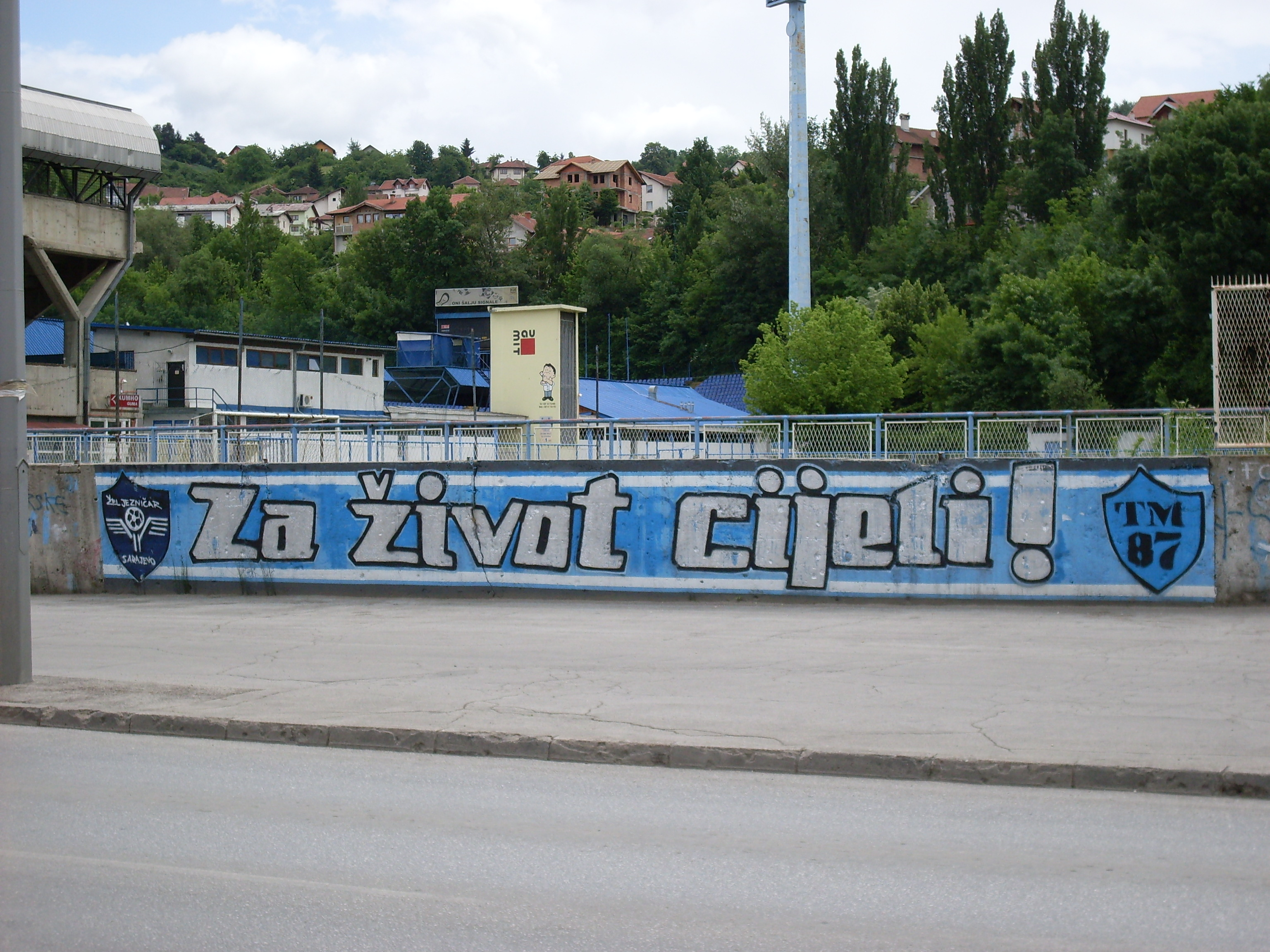
The Maniacs Graffiti at Grbavica Stadium

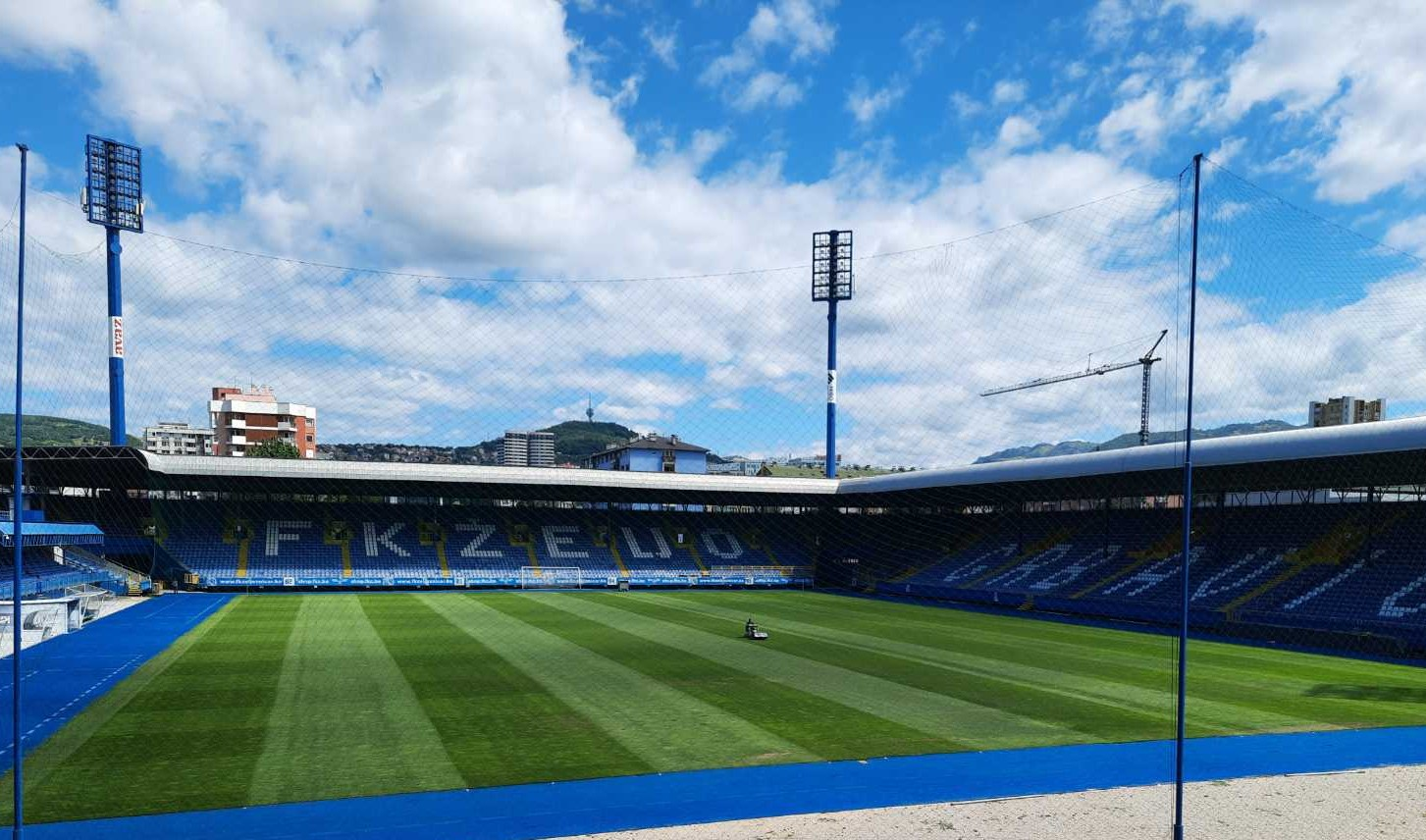
Grbavica Stadium

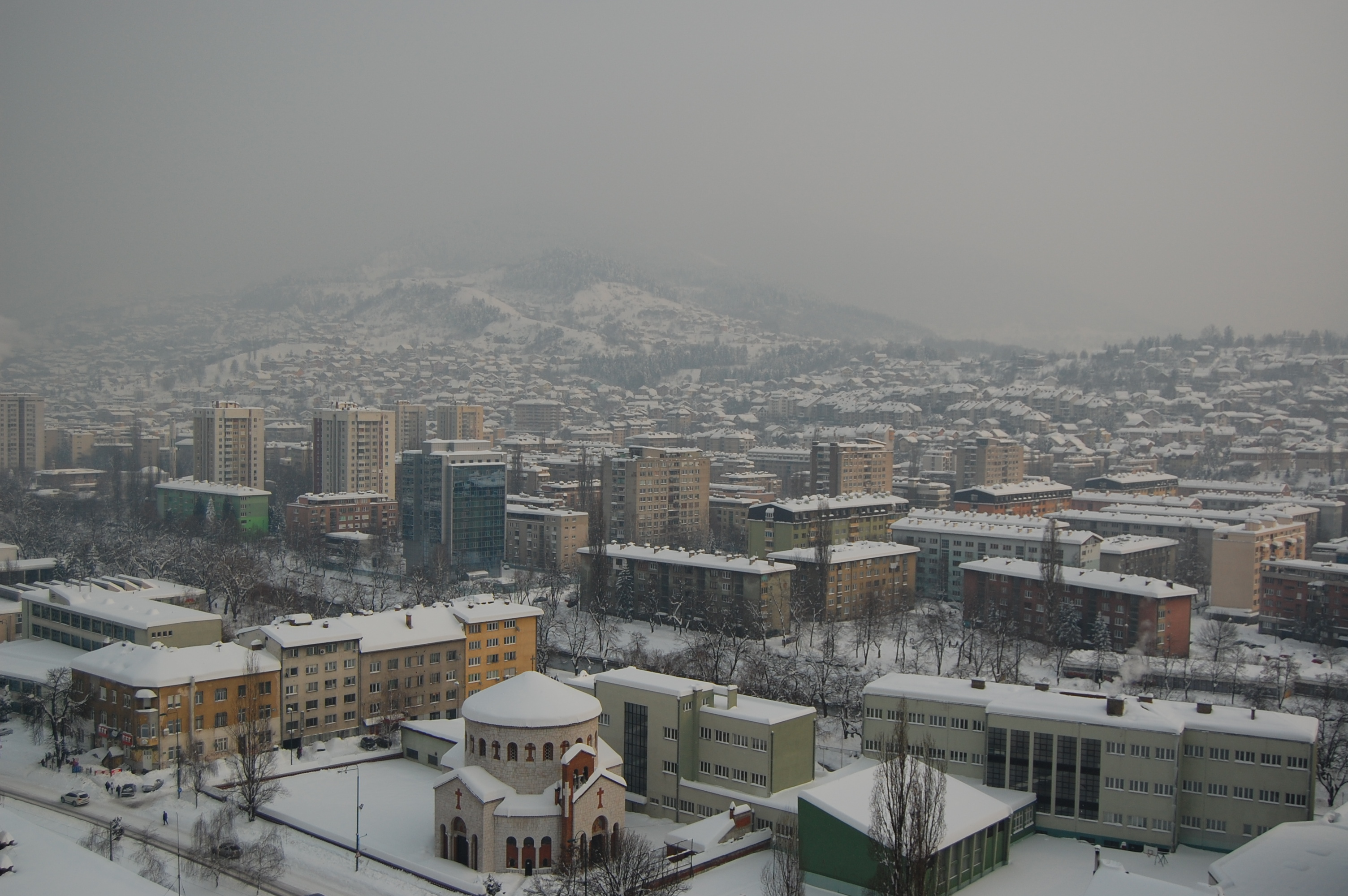
Winter panorama of Grbavica today, with an orthodox church in the foreground and the British embassy in the background

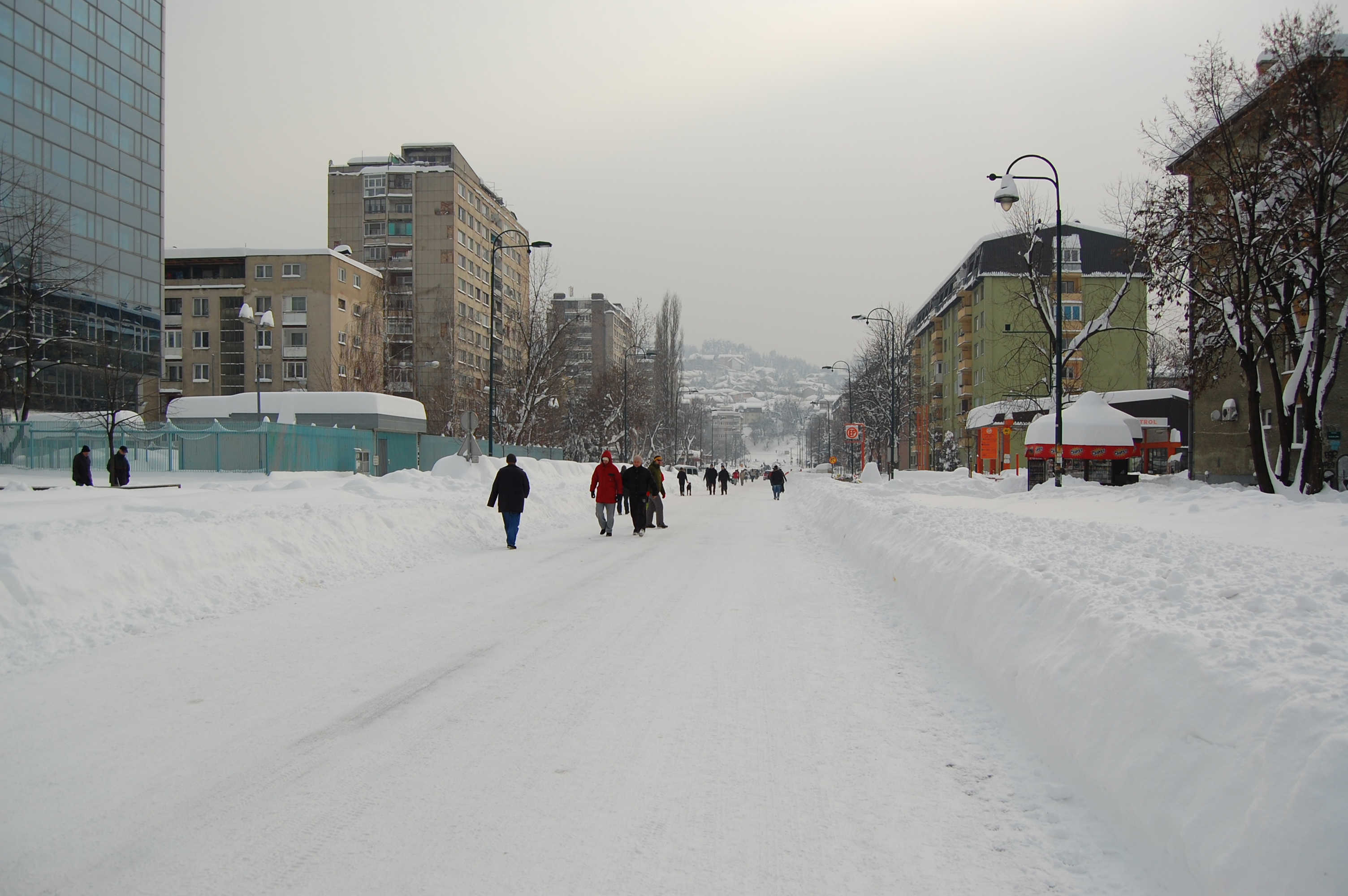
Winter scene at Hamdije Čemerlića at Grbavica

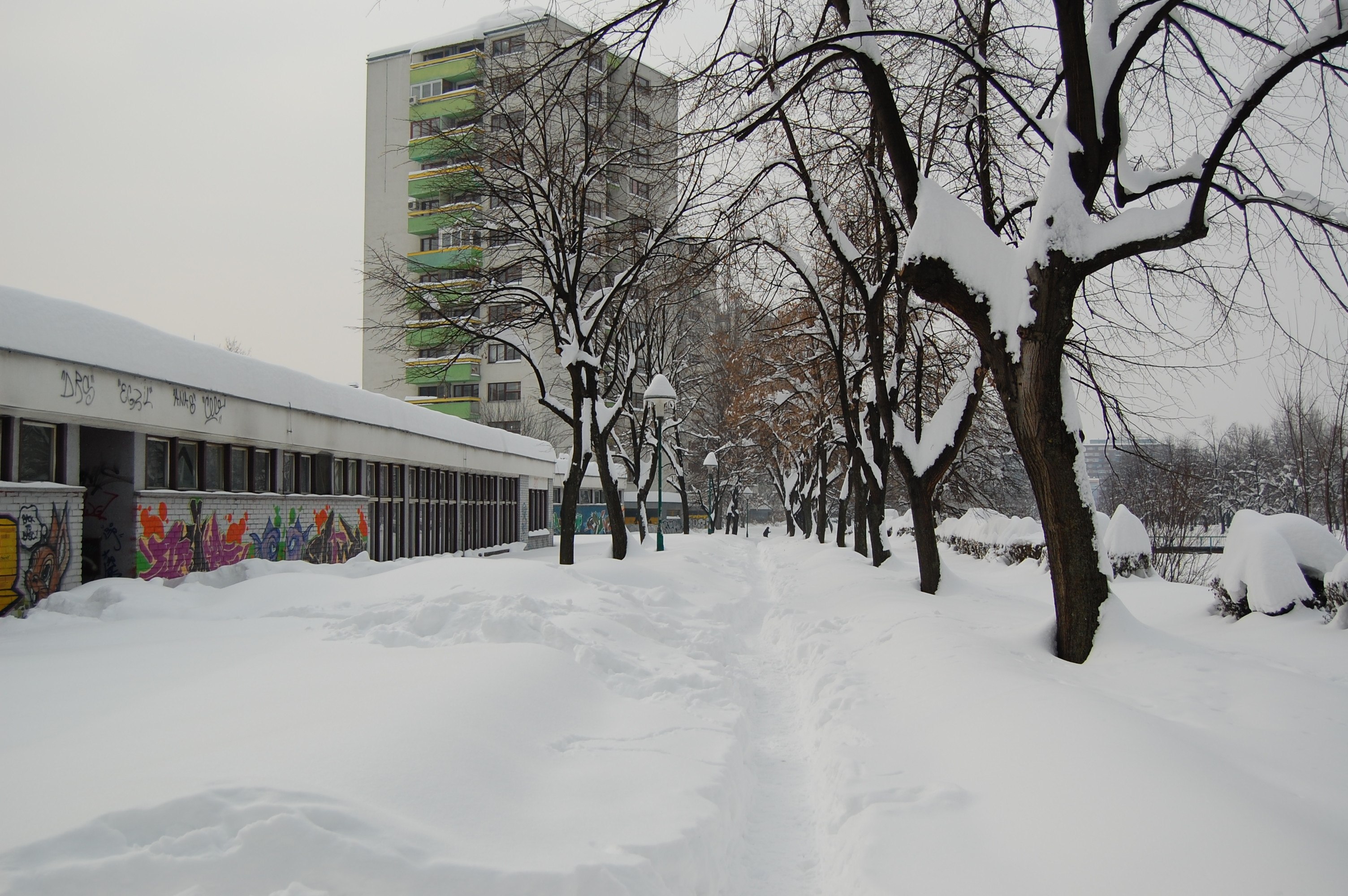
Winter scene at Grbavica on February 5, 2012

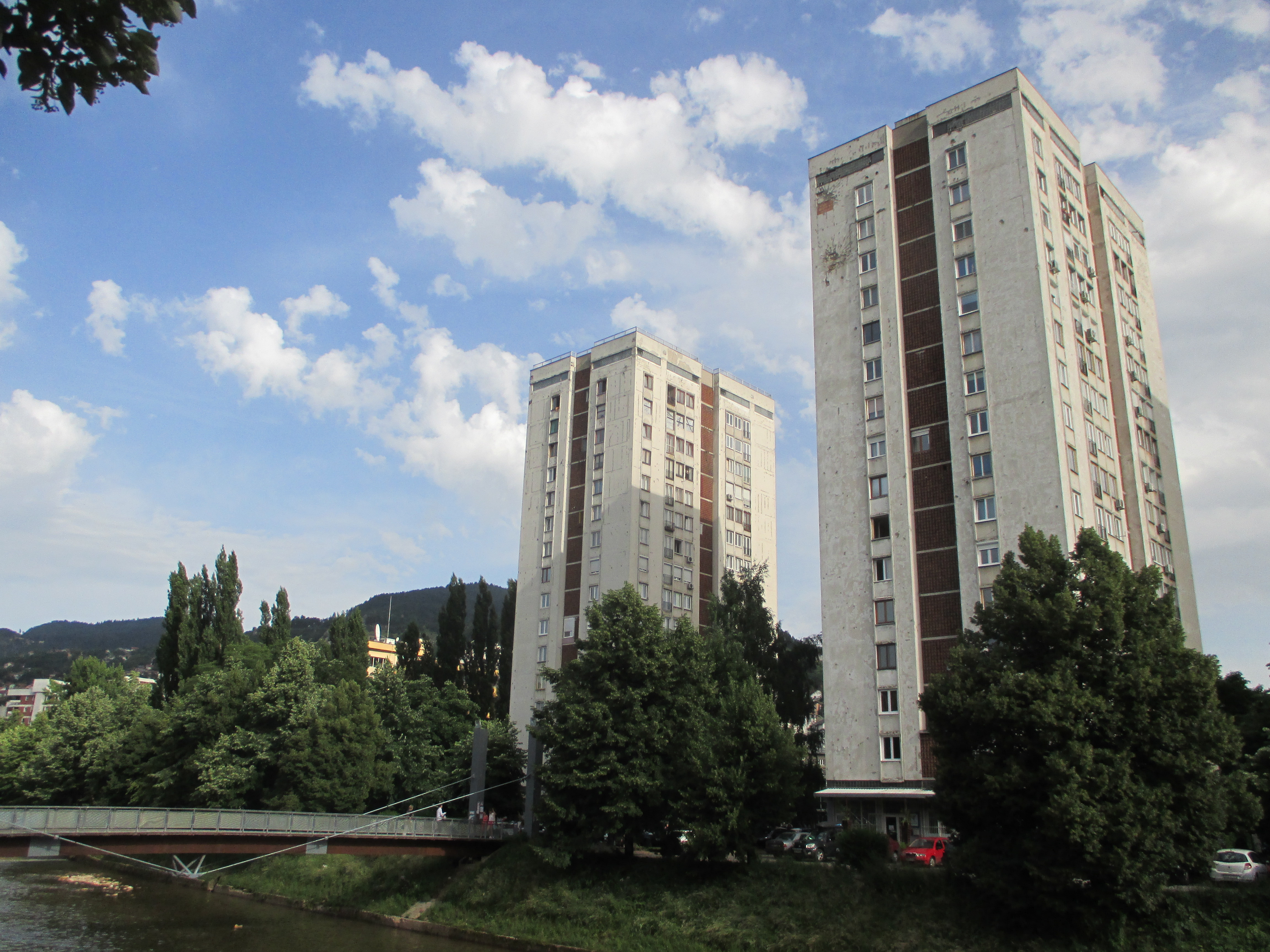
Residential high-rise buildings on the bank of the Miljacka river

== Notable former residents ==
- Božo Janković, footballer
- Milan Mladenović, musician
- Goran Čengić, handball player
- Mladen Vojičić Tifa, musician
