= 2008 National Union of Teachers strike =

British labor action

The NUT teacher strike was a 24-hour strike by teachers on 24 April 2008, over the issue of pay. It was the largest strike in Britain for more than 20 years. It is also believed that up to 8000 schools were affected by this strike. There was also a strike by the UCU, which is the teachers' trade union for further education, with over 1000 members of the UCU joining a march in London

== Causes ==
Members of the NUT were unhappy with a 2.45% pay deal, which they had said would leave teachers worse off, due to the rising cost of living in Britain. On the day of the strike every school was closed and even after that most schools were closed for further days.
