= Serwer =

Serwer is a surname. Notable people with the surname include:

- Adam Serwer (born 1982), American journalist and author
- Andrew Serwer (born 1959), American journalist
- Daniel Serwer, American academic
- Jacquelyn Serwer, American art historian and curator
