= Croat National Council (Sarajevo) =

Croatian National Council in Bosnia and Herzegovina
- Hrvatsko narodno vijeće u BiH
- Abbreviation: HNVBiH
- Predecessor: Croatian National Council of BiH
- Formation: February 6, 1994; 32 years ago
- Type: civic organization, NGO
- Headquarters: Sarajevo
- Location: H. Kreševljakovića 3
- Official language: Croatian
- Chairman: Marinko Pejić
- Main organ: Managing Board
- Website: hnv.ba

Croatian National Council in Bosnia and Herzegovina (Croatian: Hrvatsko narodno vijeće BiH) is a Sarajevo-based NGO and a civic organisation of Bosnian Croats.

== History ==
HDZ BiH won 15% of the votes for the country's parliament in 1990 elections on a Croat nationalist platform (with Croats making up 17% of the electorate, this was a convincing majority of Croat votes) and won the majority or plurality of votes in most of Croat-majority municipalities. These were later proclaimed the territory of Croatian Community of Herzeg-Bosnia and most of Croat politicians withdrew from Bosniak-dominated Sarajevo government. Forces of Herzeg-Bosnia at the time in early 1994 were amidst the conflict with Bosniak-dominated Republic of Bosnia and Herzegovina.

In February 1994 the Croatian National Council was formed in Sarajevo with support of Croat member of the country's Presidency, Croat Peasant Party chairman Ivo Komšić. It gathered Bosnian Croat politicians and intellectuals such as Ivan Lovrenović, few members of the Catholic clergy (local franciscan friars and Sarajevo archbishop) opposed to the policy of HDZ BiH and the creation of a Croat entity in Bosnia and Herzegovina in 1992, Herzeg Bosnia, calling it "irresponsible". They met in Sarajevo at the "Assembly of Croats of Bosnia and Herzegovina" (Sabor Hrvata BiH) organized by a coordination of Bosnian Croat institutions and societies. In assembly's Declaration they called for the end of war and reconciliation of Bosniaks and Croats, proposing federalization of the country by dividing it in multiethnic cantons. This was a reaction to the concept of Boasnia and Herzegovina organized in three ethnic federal units (Bosniak-, Croat- and Serb-dominated, respectively), the proposal that was discussed by the international community at the peace talks in Geneva at the time. The Declaration's concept gained international, most notably American support and paved the road to the Washington Agreement in March 1994., creating Bosniak-Croat Federation, composed of 10 cantons. This ended the Croat-Bosniak War.

After Bosnian War ended in 1995 and the Dayton Agreement was signed, CNC continued working as an NGO, opposing proposals to create a Croat-majority federal unit in Bosnia and Herzegovina. It works closely with Sarajevo-based Croatian Cultural Society "Napredak".

== Notable members ==
- Ivo Komšić
- fra Luka Markešić (1937–2014)
- Ivan Markešić
- Ivan Lovrenović
- Mario Pejić

== See also ==
- Szekler National Council
- Hungarian National Council of Transylvania
- Croat National Council (Vojvodina)
- Croatian National Assembly
