= Proposed secession of Republika Srpska =

Independence movement in Bosnia and Herzegovina

Location of the Republika Srpska (orange) and Brčko District (green) in Bosnia and Herzegovina

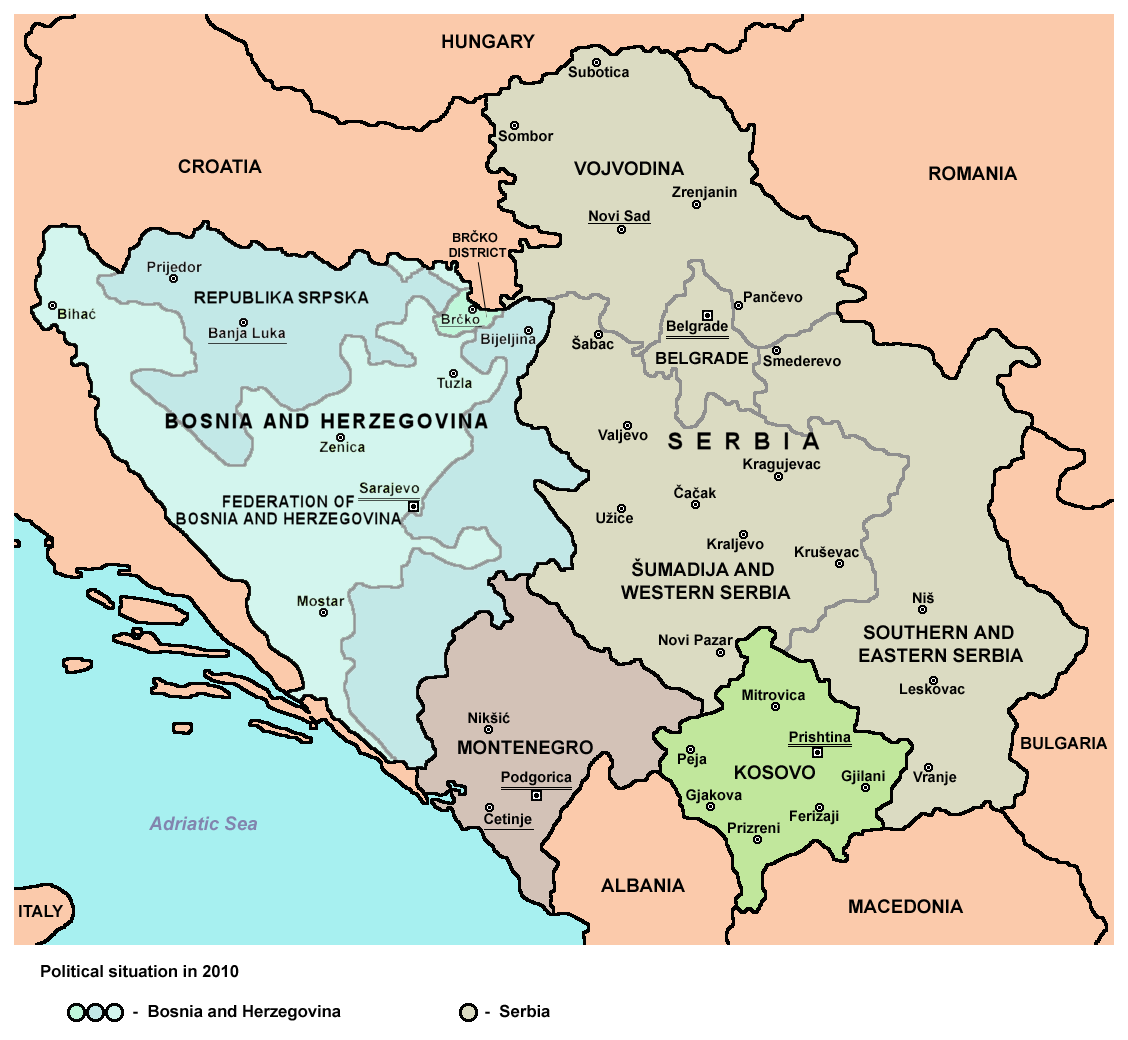
Central and eastern region of the former Yugoslavia (Republika Srpska shown in darker blue)

The Dayton Agreement ended the Bosnian War and created the federal republic of Bosnia and Herzegovina (BiH), which consists of the Bosniak and Croat-inhabited Federation of Bosnia and Herzegovina (FBiH) and the Serb-inhabited Republika Srpska (RS).

Although the Bosnian Serbs were viewed as "anti-Dayton" during the first years after the war, since 2000 they have been staunch supporters of the Dayton Agreement and the preservation of RS. Bosniaks generally view RS as illegitimate, and an independence referendum from BiH has been proposed in RS.

The 2006 Montenegrin independence referendum and Kosovo's 2008 declaration of independence have raised the possibility of a referendum and unification with Serbia. In 2015, after a judicial and police crisis, the governing Alliance of Independent Social Democrats said that it would hold an independence referendum in 2018 if RS's autonomy was not preserved.

== Background ==
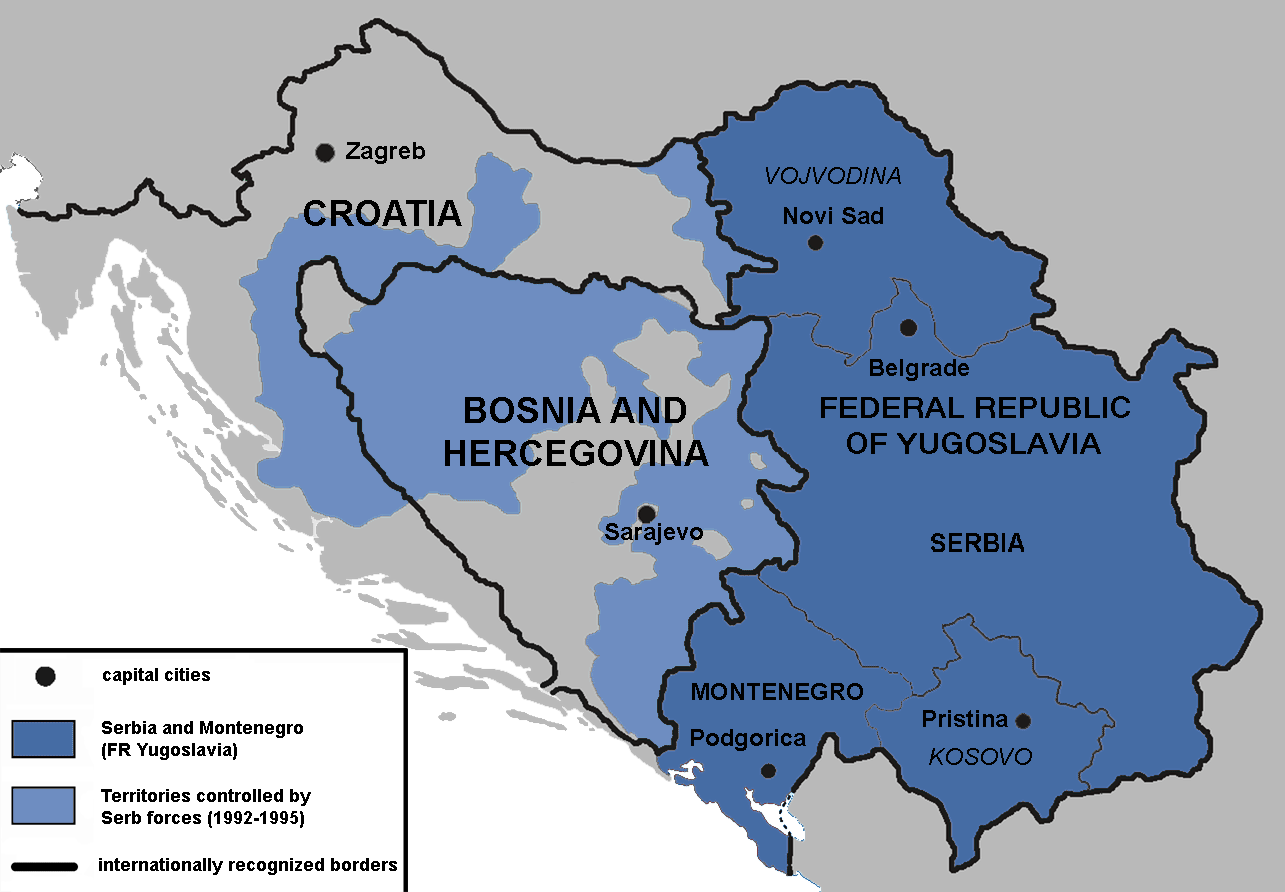
Serb control during the Yugoslav Wars

During the Yugoslav Wars, the aim of Republika Srpska (a Serb-controlled territory in the Socialist Republic of Bosnia and Herzegovina) was unification with the rest of what were considered Serb lands—the Republic of Serbian Krajina (RSK, in Croatia), Republic of Serbia and Republic of Montenegro—in the Federal Republic of Yugoslavia). The United Serb Republic was a project to unify of RS and RSK before annexation by the "mother-state of Serbia".

The Serb and Croat political leadership agreed on a partition of BiH with the 1991 Milošević–Tuđman Karađorđevo meeting and the 1992 Graz agreement, leading to a tripartite division of the country. Serb-Croat negotiations also resulted in the Croat forces turning against the Bosnian Army in the Croat–Bosniak War (1992–1994). A Bosniak republic was part of the proposed Graz agreement. The November–December 1995 Dayton Agreement ended the war and created the federal republic of Bosnia and Herzegovina, consisting of the Bosniak and Croat-inhabited Federation of Bosnia and Herzegovina (FBiH) and the Serb-inhabited Republika Srpska. According to Niels van Willigen, "Whereas the Bosnian Croats and Bosnian Serbs could identify themselves with Croatia or Serbia respectively, the absence of a Bosniak state made the Bosniaks firmly committed to Bosnia as a single political entity."

== History ==
=== After the war ===
On 12 September 1996, Republika Srpska president Biljana Plavšić called for its secession and unification with the Federal Republic of Yugoslavia; since that contravened the Dayton Agreement, however, the Organization for Security and Co-operation in Europe compelled her to retract her recommendation.

=== 2000s ===
Although the Bosnian Serbs were viewed as "anti-Dayton" shortly after the war, they have been staunch supporters of the Dayton Agreement and RS preservation since 2000. The Bosniak Party for Bosnia and Herzegovina has called for the abolition of RS. In 2003, Aleksandar Jokic wrote that an international policy partitioning Kosovo and joining Republika Srpska with Serbia and Montenegro offered "long-term security and stability for the region".

On 15 June 2006, a demonstration was held in Banja Luka supporting a Republika Srpska independence referendum if Kosovo became independent. The following year, an open letter demanding an independence referendum was presented to the Republika Srpska National Assembly. In 2007, the Bosniak and Bosnian Croat members of the Presidency of Bosnia and Herzegovina called for the abolition of their ethnic entities. In 2007, according to Walid Phares, Republika Srpska should have the same status as Kosovo.

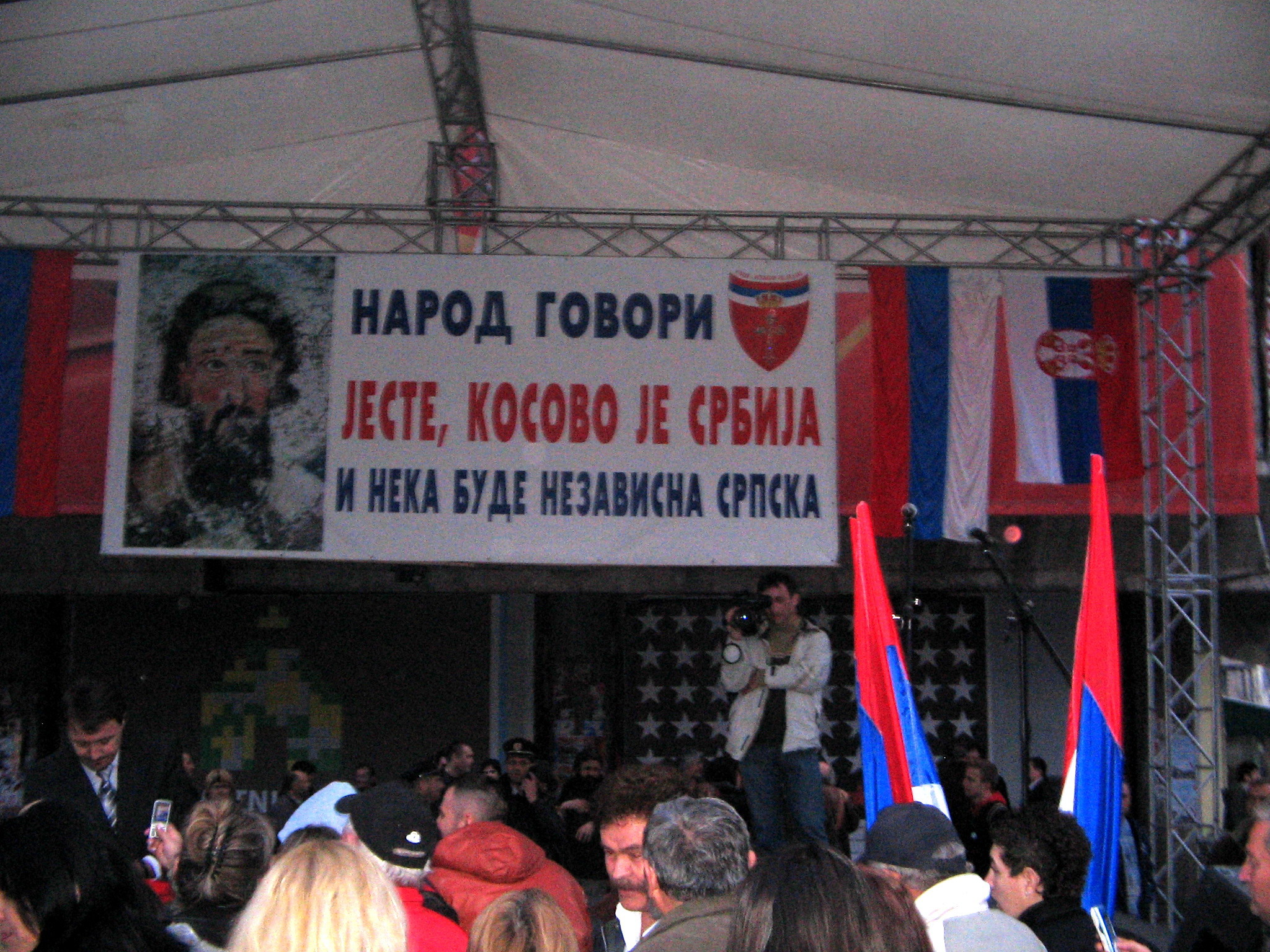
Banja Luka protest against Kosovo's declaration of independence, 27 March 2008. The banner reads, "The people say 'Yes, Kosovo is Serbia. And let [Republika] Srpska become independent'".

Since Kosovo's 2008 Declaration of Independence, Bosnian Serb nationalists have called for Milorad Dodik to keep his promise to hold a referendum. Dodik has since said that he would hold a referendum only if Republika Srpska's autonomy is threatened. Bosnian Serb lawmakers passed a resolution on 21 February 2008 calling for an independence referendum if a majority of UN members, especially members of the European Union (EU), recognise Kosovo's declaration of independence. After the resolution was passed, the US cut aid to the Alliance of Independent Social Democrats (SNSD) and the resolution was condemned by the EU. According to the Peace Implementation Council (PIC) overseeing Bosnia and Herzegovina, the country's entities have no right to secede. High Representative for Bosnia and Herzegovina Miroslav Lajčák said that RS has "absolutely no right" to secede, and he would use his Bonn Powers "if there are threats to peace and stability" or to the Dayton peace agreement: "Republika Srpska does not have the right to secede from BiH, at the same time no one can unilaterally abolish Republika Srpska." Dodik said in an interview that if most countries recognise Kosovo's self-proclaimed independence, this would legitimise the right to secession: "We do not see a single reason why we should not be granted the right to self-determination, the right envisaged in international conventions." Serbian President Boris Tadić said that Serbia does not support a breakup of Bosnia and Herzegovina and, as a guarantor of the Dayton Agreement which brought peace to Bosnia, supports Bosnia's territorial integrity.

=== 2010s ===
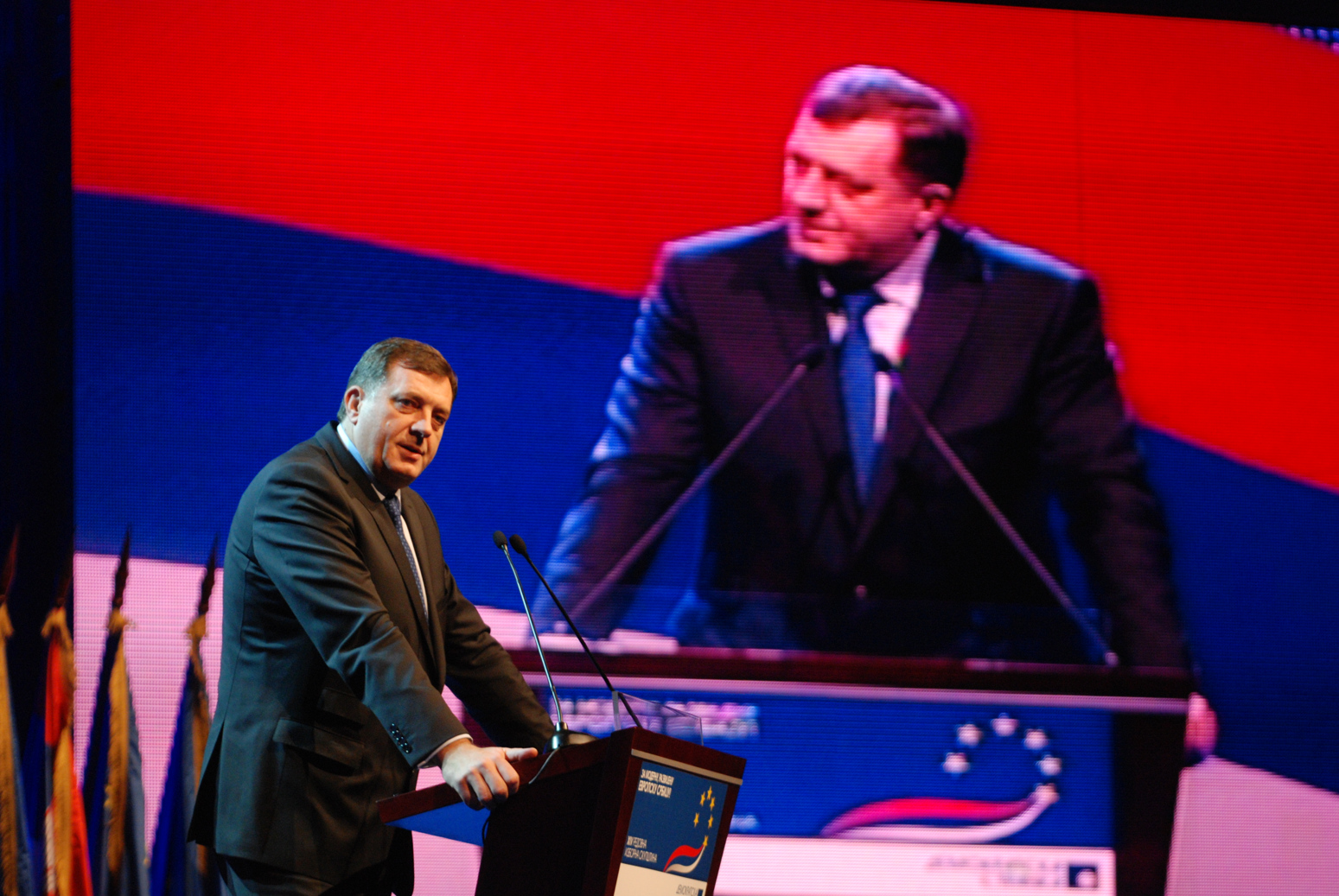
Milorad Dodik in 2010

According to a November 2010 poll of Bosnian Serbs by the Brussels-based Gallup Balkan Monitor, 88 percent would support a referendum on Republika Srpska's independence from Bosnia and Herzegovina. RS proposed a 2011 referendum on possibly leaving Bosnian institutions, which was defused by the EU.

In 2012, Dodik predicted Republika Srpska's independence. In 2013, there were discussions on the matter. Former CIA Balkans chief Steven Meyer said in 2013 and 2014 that he believed that Republika Srpska would become independent in time, that Bosnia and Herzegovina exists only on paper, and the people should decide for themselves.

The Alliance of Independent Social Democrats (SNSD), the largest Serb party in Bosnia and Herzegovina, adopted an April 2015 resolution that the RS assembly would call a 2018 referendum to break from the FBiH if RS could not increase its autonomy. Bosnian legal experts said that although the referendum (on the state court and prosecution) "would not weaken the state judiciary", it "would destabilise the country". The Party of Democratic Action (SDA), Bosnia's largest party, adopted a May 2015 resolution in which the country would be reorganized into five regions (without RS). Milorad Dodik said in November 2015 that if the Constitutional Court of Bosnia and Herzegovina was not reformed as he wished, the country was in danger.

Pravda reported in January 2016 that Dodik said that American lobbyists asked for US$1 billion in return for independence in 10 to 15 years. Analysts at Mic said that RS would become independent by 2025. According to a BMI Research analysis, "Bosnia's Serbian entity, Republika Srpska (RS), is unlikely to achieve formal independence over the next five years, owing to widespread opposition on the part of the EU and US, which do not wish to see a redrawing of Balkan borders. RS could conceivably declare independence regardless, but it would risk being diplomatically and economically isolated." In February 2016, the RS court referendum was indefinitely postponed. US Balkan analyst Daniel Serwer said in May 2015 that RS would never become independent. On 31 May of that year, Dodik said that RS was in danger of disappearing.

In December 2016, High Representative Valentin Inzko said that "separatism" (an RS independence referendum) would force international "intervention". According to Inzko, the international community would never recognize an independent RS; although he had the power to replace Dodik, those "times have passed. Today we need domestic solutions and responsibility".

In May 2017, Steven Meyer (considering the possible creation of Greater Albania) said that Bosnia and Herzegovina was "far from a united country" and predicted a deteriorating relationship with RS. In July, he reiterated that "it remains a country in name only; a fiction that is real only in the minds of outdated, mostly mid-level American—and some European—diplomats."

In June and September 2017, Dodik said that plans for a 2018 independence referendum had been dropped.

Presidency member Bakir Izetbegović threatened war in November of that year if Republika Srpska opted for independence, saying that Bosnia and Herzegovina should recognize the independence of Kosovo. On 22 November 2017, the issue was examined on RTV BN's Globalno.

=== 2020s ===
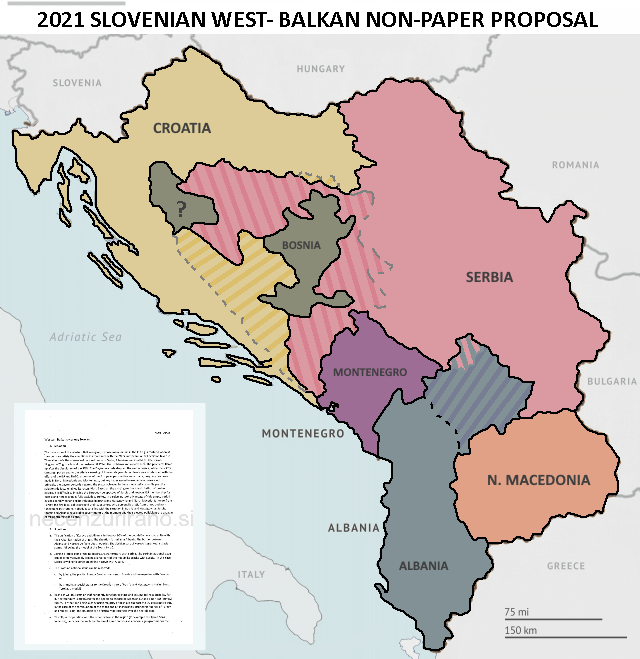
Map of the Western Balkans according to the first non-paper

The 2021 Balkan non-papers were two documents of unknown origin, with several sources claiming that they had been drafted by the government of Slovenia. The first non-paper called for the "peaceful dissolution" of Bosnia and Herzegovina with the annexation of Republika Srpska and great parts of Herzegovina and Central Bosnia into a Greater Serbia and Greater Croatia, leaving a small Bosniak state in what is central and western Bosnia.

In 2022, Russia's invasion of Ukraine heightened fears of instability in the Western Balkans, with concerns that Moscow's influence could embolden Republika Srpska's secessionist ambitions. Western powers responded by reinforcing support for Bosnia and Herzegovina's sovereignty and addressing regional vulnerabilities.

In April 2023, Dodik emphasized the idea of uniting Republika Srpska with Serbia, portraying it as a natural progression for the Serb population. He suggested that the current constitutional framework, established by the Dayton Peace Agreement, had outlived its purpose and that Republika Srpska's future lay in greater autonomy or outright independence.

In January 2024, Republika Srpska moved to establish independent institutions, including its own electoral commission, seen as a step toward secession. The US and EU condemned these actions, warning of threats to Bosnia and Herzegovina's integrity. High Representative Christian Schmidt called it a breach of the Dayton Accords, and the US imposed sanctions on Dodik and other officials. Shortly after, Milorad Dodik announced plans for an independence referendum, raising concerns about regional destabilization.

== Polls ==
Source	Question and result
January and March 2004 poll in Early Warning Report by UNDP	30% for unification with Serbia and Montenegro or independence
September 2005 public opinion poll by Prism Research Sarajevo, asking Bosnian Serbs	71.3% agree that "Constitution does not work" in BiH, 22.1% disagree
15–21 June 2007 poll with sample of 1,699 (992 from RS, 707 from FBiH)	54% in favour of independence
October 2009 poll by NDI, asking RS citizens	45% disagree with state rearrangement, 33% support three independent states
November 2010 poll by Gallup Balkan Monitor, asking Bosnian Serbs	88% in favour of independence
2011 poll by Gallup Balkan Monitor, asking RS citizens	87% in favour of independence
May 2013 poll by Prism Research Sarajevo, asking Bosnian Serbs	59.3% in favour of independence, 11.1% unification with Serbia, 16.8% unchanged status
17–20 July 2015 poll by Centar za društvena istraživanja i analize, sample of 1,414 people (RS)	53.54% in favour of independence, 15.34% against
2015 poll by IMPAQ International, asking RS citizens	49% disagree with state rearrangement, 14% in favour of three independent states
2016 poll by IMPAQ International, asking RS citizens	55% in favour of independence or unification with Serbia
December 2021 poll by NDI, asking RS citizens (894 sample)	41% support independence, 33% oppose

== See also ==
- Republika Srpska–Serbia relations
- Proposed Bosniak republic
- Croatian Republic of Herzeg-Bosnia
- Kosovo independence precedent
- Partition of Kosovo
- Annexation of Crimea by the Russian Federation
- Proposed Croat federal unit in Bosnia and Herzegovina
- Greater Serbia
- 2021 Balkan non-papers
