= Proposed Bosniak republic =

Geopolitical proposal of the Bosnian War

Proportion of Bosniaks in Bosnia and Herzegovina (2013 census): more than 90 % 80–90 % 65–80 % 50–65 % 40–50 % 30–40 % 20–30 % 10–20 % 5–10 % 1–5 % less than 1 %

A Bosniak republic as an ethnonational state of Bosniaks, was proposed during the Bosnian War and has been part of the political discourse since the war. There has been proposals of secession of Republika Srpska inhabited by Serbs, as well as the proposal to create a Croat entity that would de facto lead to a Bosniak entity (bošnjački entitet).

== History ==
The establishment of a Bosnian Muslim state was proposed during the Bosnian War when plans for the partition of Bosnia and Herzegovina were made. It would either be established as one of three ethnic states in a loose confederation, or as an independent "Muslim state" in the area controlled by the Bosnian Army, as proposed by Islamists. Thus, the Bosniak-inhabited territories or Bosnian Army-controlled area (the Republic of Bosnia and Herzegovina) would become a Bosniak state, as Republika Srpska was for the Bosnian Serbs and Herzeg-Bosnia for the Bosnian Croats. The failed 1992 Serb–Croat Graz agreement would see a small Bosniak buffer state, pejoratively called "Alija's Pashaluk" on a map displayed during the discussions. The Owen-Stoltenberg plan (July 1993) would give Bosniaks 30% of territory, including ca. 65% of the Bosniak population (according to the 1991 census). Slobodan Milošević suggested the name "Republic of Bosnia" (Republika Bosna) for the Bosnian Muslim entity or state.

At the 21-23 December 1993 talks the Serbs and Croats agreed on a "Muslim republic" with 33.3% of territory but it was rejected by the Bosniaks as it was not what they wanted. On 10 January 1994 the Croat delegation proposed a contract with 33.3% of territory to the Bosniaks and 17.5% to the Croats. Chapter 4 of that contract dealt with the dissolution of Bosnia and Herzegovina, in which the Bosnian Muslim republic would inherit the membership to UN and Herzeg-Bosna would have the right to unite with Croatia, and as sovereign states, they would form a confederation.

In February 1994, the Party of Democratic Action (SDA) proposed a Bosniak state in which Serbs and Croats would be national minorities. The Dayton Agreement (November–December 1995) ended the war and created the federal republic of Bosnia and Herzegovina (BiH), made up of two entities, the Bosniak and Croat-inhabited Federation of Bosnia and Herzegovina (FBiH), and the Serb-inhabited Republika Srpska (RS). As noted by international relations expert Niels van Willigen: "Whereas the Bosnian Croats and Bosnian Serbs could identify themselves with Croatia or Serbia respectively, the absence of a Bosniak state made the Bosniaks firmly committed to Bosnia as a single political entity."

Propaganda texts appeared in 1996, after the war, calling for a Bosniak state. In 2000, secular Bosniaks warned that a partition of the state would lead their people to Islamic fundamentalism.

Grand Mufti Mustafa Cerić claimed that the Bosniaks were an autochthonous people with rights to a nation-state. In the 2012 debates surrounding the next appointment of the reis-ul-ulema of the Islamic Community in Bosnia and Herzegovina, Fikret Karčić disagreed with Mustafa Cerić that Bosniaks would be the only without a nation-state, and called the formation of a Bosniak state simply a Bantustan. Karčić saw a multinational state as the only option for the Bosniak nation, thereby limiting the Islamic Community to religious function. In 2013 it was noted that an Islamic Bosniak state did not have support among the young Bosniaks, and fewer than 10% supported an independent Bosniak state.

Many Croat political organizations, including the Croatian National Assembly, call for the partition of the Federation to create a Croat federal unit; most proposals entail the remainder of the territory of the Federation becoming, either de facto or formally, a Bosniak entity.

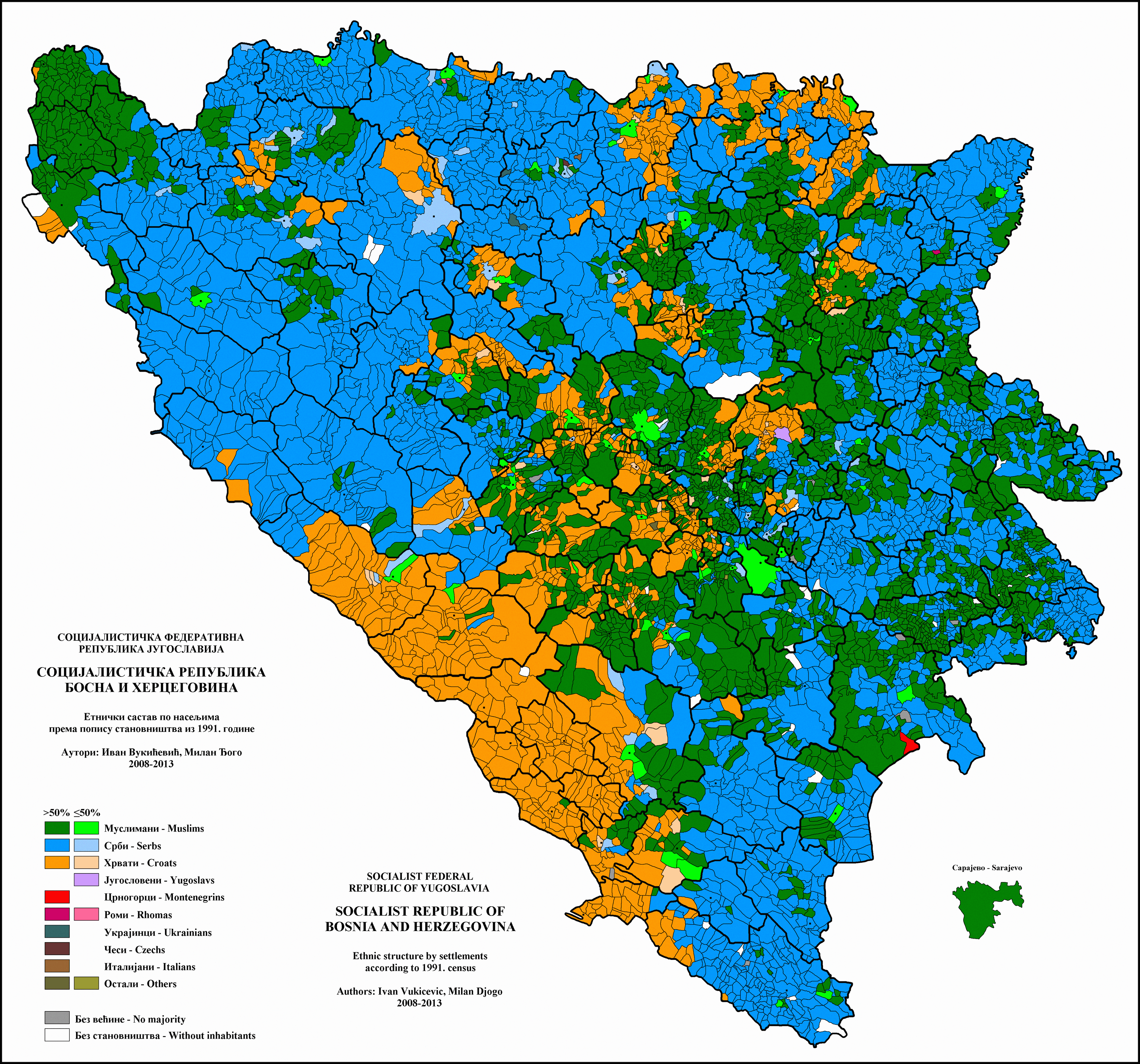
Ethnic composition in 1991

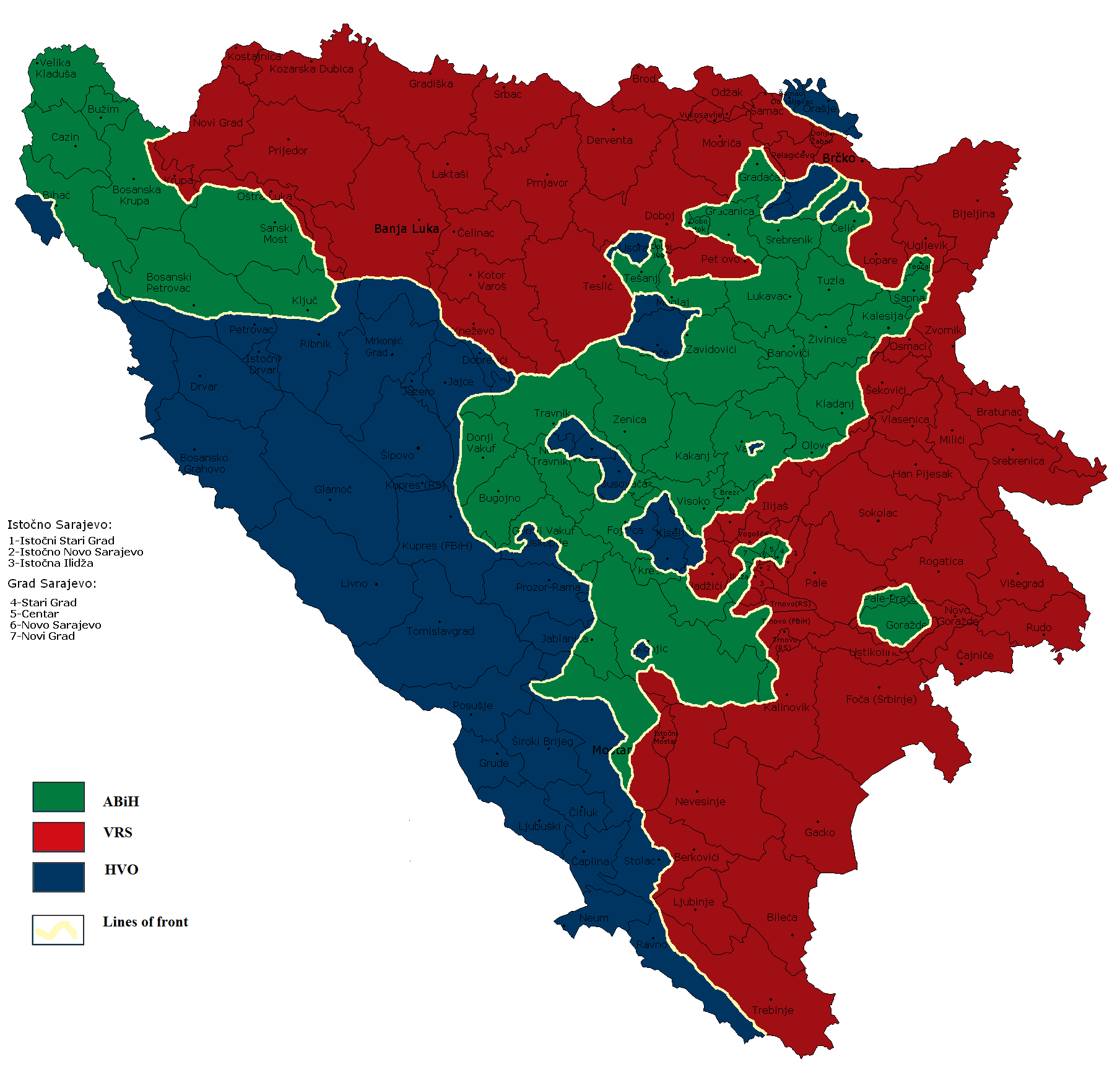
Military control before Dayton (1995)

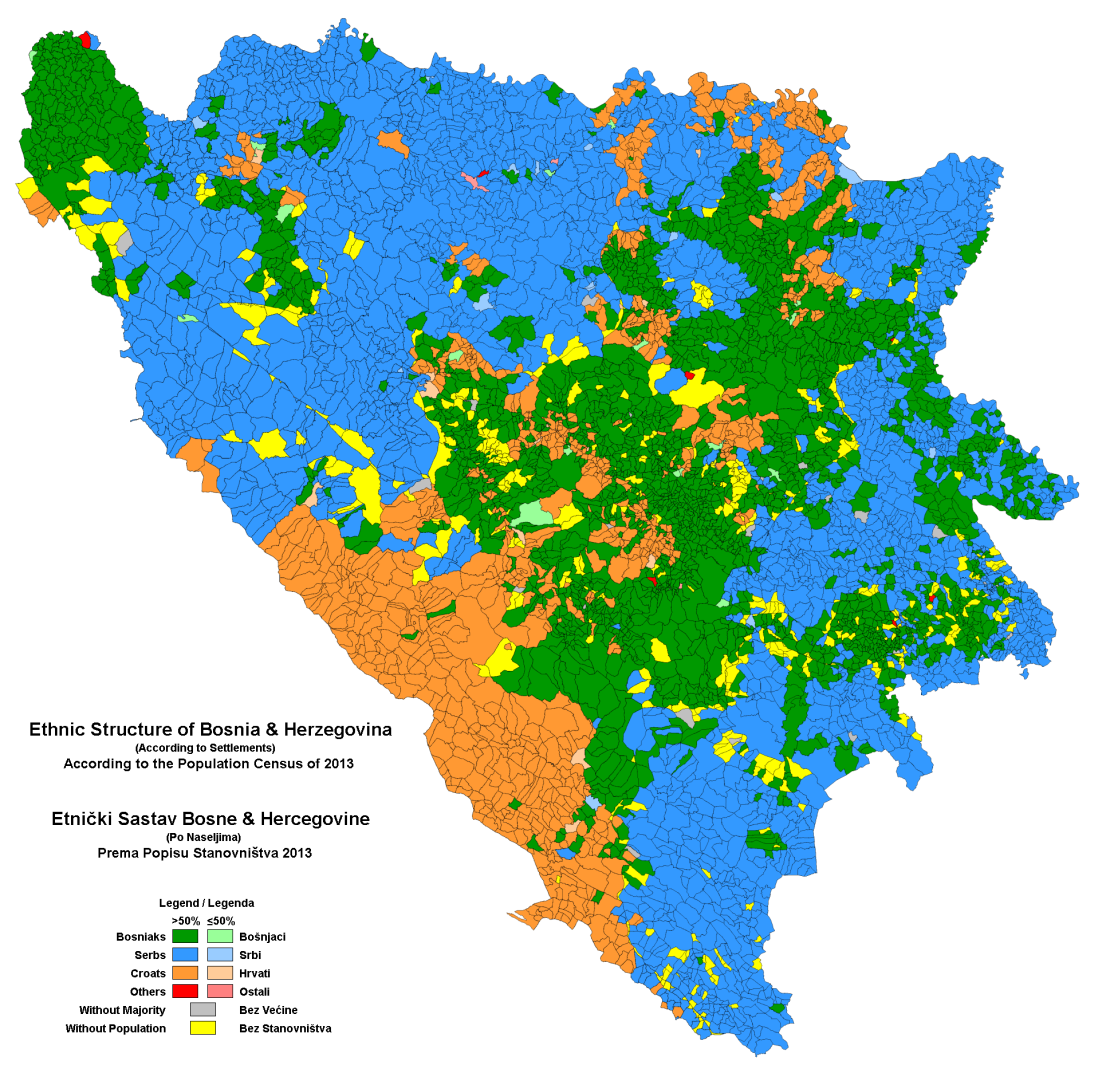
Ethnic composition in 2013

== Polls ==
In IPSOS polls, in 2005 citizens wanting a Bosniak entity were 7%, and in 2013 were 13%.

Source	Question and result
October 2009 poll by NDI, asking FBiH citizens	4% support division into three independent states, 60% support abolishment of entities
May 2013 poll by Prism Research Sarajevo, asking Bosniaks	16.6% support separate Bosniak entity or state, 6.5% division into three states
2015 poll by IMPAQ International, asking FBiH citizens	2% support division into three independent states, 52% support abolishment of entities
2016 poll by IMPAQ International, asking FBiH citizens	2% support division into three independent states

== See also ==
- Zulfikarpašić–Karadžić agreement
- Partition of Bosnia and Herzegovina
- Peace plans proposed before and during the Bosnian War
- Proposed secession of Republika Srpska

== Annotations ==
1. During the war it was referred to as the "Muslim republic" (Muslimanska republika) or "Bosnian Muslim republic", "Bosniak-Muslim republic" (Bošnjačko-muslimanska republika). Following the war it has been referred to as the "Bosnian Muslim republic", "Bosniak republic" (Bošnjačka republika), or simply "Bosniak state" (Bošnjačka država).

== Sources ==
- Bougarel, Xavier (2017-12-14). Islam and Nationhood in Bosnia-Herzegovina: Surviving Empires. Bloomsbury Publishing. ISBN 978-1-350-00360-6.
- Bugajski, Janusz (2013). Return of the Balkans: Challenges to European Integration and U.S. Disengagement. Strategic Studies Institute and U.S. Army War College Press. ISBN 978-1-58487-570-3.
- Burg, Steven L.; Shoup, Paul S. (2015). Ethnic Conflict and International Intervention: Crisis in Bosnia-Herzegovina, 1990-93. Routledge. ISBN 978-1-317-47102-8.
- Crkvenčić, Ivan (1993). Croatia--a New European State: Proceedings of the Symposium Held in Zagreb and Čakovec, September 22-25, 1993. Department for Geography and Spatial Planning, Faculty of Science, University of Zagreb. ISBN 978-953-6235-03-2.
- Klemenčić, Mladen (1994). Territorial Proposals for the Settlement of the War in Bosnia-Hercegovina. IBRU. ISBN 978-1-897643-15-0.
- Kostić, Roland (2007). Ambivalent Peace: External Peacebuilding Threatened Identity and Reconciliation in Bosnia and Herzegovina. Ambivalent Peace. pp. 78–. ISBN 978-91-506-1950-8.
- Trnka, Kasim (2000). Konstitutivnost naroda: povodom odluke Ustavnog suda Bosne i Hercegovine o konstitutivnosti Bošnjaka, Hrvata i Srba i na nivou entiteta. Vijeće Kongresa bošnjačkih intelektualaca. ISBN 978-9958-47-072-1.
- Velikonja, Mitja (2003). Religious Separation and Political Intolerance in Bosnia-Herzegovina. Texas A&M University Press. pp. 278–. ISBN 978-1-60344-724-9.
