= Croatian National Assembly =

Organisation of political parties in Bosnia and Herzegovina

Croatian National Assembly of Bosnia and Herzegovina
- Hrvatski narodni sabor Bosne i Hercegovine
- Flag of the Croatian National Assembly

- Logo of Croatian National Assembly

- Coat of arms of Croatian National Assembly
- Abbreviation: HNS BiH
- Formation: 28 October 2000; 26 years ago
- Type: political platform
- Purpose: coordinating Croatian politics
- Headquarters: Trg hrvatskih velikana Mostar, Bosnia and Herzegovina
- Location: Croatian Lodge "Herceg Stjepan Kosača"
- Official language: Croatian
- Secretary General: Josip Merdžo
- President: Dragan Čović
- Chairman of the General Secretariat: Božo Ljubić
- Main organ: General Assembly
- Website: hnsbih.org

The Croatian National Assembly (Croatian: Hrvatski narodni sabor) is a political organisation of Croat political parties in Bosnia and Herzegovina. The organisation serves as a platform to coordinate political and cultural activities of different parties and stakeholders in the Croatian community and to promote the initiative to create a federal unit with Croatian majority ("Third entity") in the country.

== History ==
Croat self-government in Bosnia – a challenge for Dayton? European Centre for Minority Issues, May 2001

Bosnia Herzegovina 2001: the international community versus the Bosnian Croats BHHRG

Office of the High Representative: Chronology/Monthly Tracker 2001

In 2000, the Office of the High Representative in the country imposed amendments to the Federation entity's constitution and its electoral law. Dissatisfied Croat politicians led by Ante Jelavić and HDZ set up a separate Croatian National Assembly on 28 October in Novi Travnik, held a referendum parallel to the elections and proclaimed Croat self-rule in a federal unit in Croat-majority areas in the Federation (Hrvatska samouprava - "Third entity"). The attempt ended shortly after a crackdown by SFOR and judiciary proceedings.

In 2010–14 Federation's Government was formed and Federation's president appointed without the consent of Croat deputies in the House of Peoples, receiving just 5 votes of confidence out of 17. In March 2011 country's Central Election Commission declared HoP's composition and decisions to be illegal, but the High Representative Valentin Inzko suspended CEC's decision. After Croatian politician Božo Ljubić filed an appeal, finally, in December 2016 Constitutional Court of Bosnia and Herzegovina found the election system of the deputies in the House of Peoples unconstitutional and abrogated the controversial rules. Croatian National Assembly was thus reactivated in April 2011 in Mostar and started pushing for the reorganization of country and Federation, the change of the electoral system and a public broadcasting system in Croatian, focused on Bosnian Croats.

== Political positions ==
Dissatisfied with the representation of Croats in the Federation, Croat political parties insist on creating a Croat-majority federal unit instead of several cantons. SDA and other Bosniak parties strongly oppose this.

In the 2014 Bosnia elections, most of the parties participating in the CNA formed a joint electoral coalition to contest the entity and state parliamentary elections as well as the elections for the Croat member of the state presidency. They won 14 out of 17 Croat seats in the House of Peoples in Federation's Parliament and 4 out of 5 Croat seats in the State House of Peoples, together with 19 seats in Federation's and 14 in State House of Representatives, respectively.

In January 2017, Croatian National Assembly stated that “if Bosnia and Herzegovina wants to become self-sustainable, then it is necessary to have an administrative-territorial reorganization, which would include a federal unit with a Croatian majority. It remains the permanent aspiration of the Croatian people of Bosnia and Herzegovina.”

== Structure ==
Flag of the Croatian Republic of Herzeg-Bosnia, used by the HNS BiH

The HNS has a 29-member Presidency, headed by Dragan Čović. HNS's 14-member General Secretariat is chaired by Božo Ljubić as the president, while Secretary-general is Josip Merdžo. The members of the General Secretariat are heads of HNS Departments. Presidency and General Secretariat are main bodies of HNS between its assembly sessions. The HNS has twelve departments.

The members of HNS BiH are all Croats who are elected

- deputies in cantonal assemblies in the Federation,
- deputies in the Parliament of the Federation of Bosnia and Herzegovina,
- mayors of cities, towns and municipalities,
- deputies in the Parliamentary Assembly of Bosnia and Herzegovina,
- cabinet ministers in the Federation, Republika Srpska or in the Council of Ministers of Bosnia and Herzegovina.

== Members ==
Political parties supporting the work of Croatian National Assembly and whose members participate in its operations are:

- Croatian Democratic Union of Bosnia and Herzegovina (HDZ BiH)
- Croatian Democratic Union 1990 (HDZ 1990)
- Croatian National Shift (HNP)
- Croatian Republican Party (HRS)
- Croatian Party of Rights of Bosnia and Herzegovina and Herzeg-Bosnia (HSP BiH i HB)
- Croatian Party of Rights of Bosnia and Herzegovina (HSP BiH)
- Croatian Peasant Party of Stjepan Radić (HSS SR)
- Croatian Peasant Party of Bosnia and Herzegovina (HSS BiH)
- Croatian Alliance (HKDU-HRAST)
- Croatian Party of Rights Dr. Ante Starčević of Bosnia and Herzegovina (HSP AS)
- Croatian Christian Democratic Union of Bosnia and Herzegovina (HKDU BiH)
- Croatian Democratic Union (HDU)
- Croatian Independent List (HNL)
- Čapljina Independent Party - Čapljina in Heart (ČNS)

== See also ==
- Szekler National Council
- Hungarian National Council of Transylvania
- Croat National Council (Vojvodina)
- Croat National Council (Sarajevo)

== Sources ==
- Belloni, Roberto (2008). "State Building and International Intervention in Bosnia". London: Routledge. ISBN 9781134059683.
- Tesser, Lynn (2013). "Ethnic Cleansing and the European Union: An Interdisciplinary Approach to Security, Memory and Ethnography". Basingstoke: Palgrave Macmillan. ISBN 9781137308788.
