= Political entities of Bosnia and Herzegovina =

Top-level politicial division of Bosnia and Herzegovina

Entities of Bosnia and Herzegovina
- Also known as: entiteti Bosne i Hercegovine ентитети Босне и Херцеговине
- Political divisions of Bosnia and Herzegovina: Republika Srpska entity (1), Federation of Bosnia and Herzegovina entity (2), Brčko District condominium (3)
- Location: Bosnia and Herzegovina
- Created: 14 December 1995
- Number: 2

Bosnia and Herzegovina is divided into two entities – the Federation of Bosnia and Herzegovina (FBiH) and Republika Srpska (RS) – defined by the Dayton Agreement in December 1995. The Brčko District, a condominium of the two entities, was established in 1999.

The vast majority of the inhabitants of the Federation of Bosnia and Herzegovina are Bosniaks and Croats. In contrast, in Republika Srpska, the vast majority are Serbs.

The country's constitution does not define the form of state (for example, by specifying that it is a federation or a confederation). It is, however, seen by scholars as a federation, or is assumed to be a federation; as such, it is at the same time a federation of its two subnational entities and of its three constituent peoples. According to Soeren Keil, the country "moved from a confederal-like system in 1995 to a multinational federation", and has since existed as a "federal system sui generis". While one of the entities is itself called "Federation of Bosnia and Herzegovina", the meaning of "federation" in that entity's official name is different from the (unofficial) federal character of Bosnia and Herzegovina. "Federation" in the name of the entity does not refer to a federation of any of that entity's own subdivisions, but to a federation of two peoples: it is a Bosniak-Croat federation.

== Overview ==
The Federation of Bosnia and Herzegovina is split into 10 cantons, local governing units endowed with substantial autonomy. In contrast, Republika Srpska operates under a centralised government structure. While the state level holds limited exclusive or joint responsibilities, the entities wield most of the authority. The Federation of Bosnia and Herzegovina and Republika Srpska control the majority of jurisdictions and resources, each with its own constitution, president, parliament, government, and prime minister. They manage citizenship matters and primarily enforce laws since the state level lacks this ability. The entities serve as the primary level for distributing state-collected funds and oversee a significant portion of civil and political rights. They hold direct representation in state-level institutions and essentially possess veto power over all state policies.

First-level divisions
Name	Area (km^{2})	Population	Density (km^{2})	Ethnic groups	Municipalities	Status	Map
Federation of Bosnia and Herzegovina; Federacija Bosne i Hercegovine; Федерација Босне и Херцеговине	26,110.5	2,243,000	85.9	Bosniaks (70.40%); Croats (22.44%); Serbs (2.55%)	79 (including 22 cities)	Entity	
Republika Srpska; Република Српска; Republika Srpska	24,532.8	1,209,000	49.3	Serbs (82.95%); Bosniaks (12.69%); Croats (2.27%)	64 (including 10 cities)	Entity	
Brčko District; Brčko Distrikt; Брчко Дистрикт	493	85,000	172.4	Bosniaks (42.36%); Serbs (34.58%); Croats (20.66%)	—N/a	Self-governing condominium	

== See also ==
- Proposed Croat federal unit in Bosnia and Herzegovina
- Administrative divisions of Yugoslavia
