= Adam Serwer =

American journalist (born 1982)

- Born: 1982 (age 43–44)
- Education: Vassar College (AB); Columbia University (MA)
- Occupation: Journalist
- Employer: The Atlantic

Adam Serwer (born 1982) is an American journalist and author. He is a staff writer at The Atlantic where his work focuses on politics, race, and justice. He previously worked at BuzzFeed News, The American Prospect, and Mother Jones.

Serwer has received awards from the National Association of Black Journalists (NABJ), The Root, and the Society of Professional Journalists. He was named a spring 2019 Shorenstein Center fellow, and received the 2019 Hillman Prize for Opinion & Analysis Journalism.

== Life and career ==
Serwer was raised in Washington, D.C. His father, Daniel Serwer, was in the Foreign Service, which resulted in Serwer spending part of his childhood overseas. His mother, Jacquelyn Serwer, is the chief curator of the Smithsonian Institution's National Museum of African American History and Culture. His father is of Polish Jewish descent, and his mother is African-American.

Serwer received his bachelor's degree from Vassar College and his master's degree from the Columbia University Graduate School of Journalism. Following graduate school, he was a writing fellow at The American Prospect. He later worked at Mother Jones, MSNBC, The Washington Post, Jack and Jill Politics, Salon, and The Atlantic as a guest blogger for Ta-Nehisi Coates. In August 2014, he began work at BuzzFeed News as the national editor.

In August 2016, Serwer was hired as a senior editor at The Atlantic. His work there has focused on white supremacy, race in America, and the Trump administration. Essays such as "The Nationalist's Delusion", "White Nationalism's Deep American Roots", and "The Cruelty Is the Point" have been cited by other journalists in various outlets. He has appeared on other media outlets such as All Things Considered, The Opposition with Jordan Klepper, In the Thick, and On My Mind with Diane Rehm to discuss his writing. In his best known essay, "The Cruelty Is the Point", published in 2018, Serwer argued that the Trump administration’s policies were not only cruel, but cruel by design.

In 2019, Serwer received a fellowship from the Shorenstein Center, for which he researched the historical role of African Americans and voting. He received the 2019 Hillman Prize for his work on the rise of Trump, Trumpism and America's history of racism.

His first book, The Cruelty Is the Point: The Past, Present, and Future of Trump's America, is a collection of essays that was released June 29, 2021 by One World/Penguin Random House. The book was named to the New York Times Best Seller list. Kirkus reviewed it as "a strong contribution to conversations about racism, injustice, and violence, all of which continue to plague this country."

=== The cruelty is the point ===
The cruelty is the point is a phrase coined by Serwer in a 2018 essay in The Atlantic that has often been used to characterize the campaign and administration of US President Donald Trump, as well as the MAGA movement. The phrase has also been of use in discussions on immigration rights. Although the term is often applied to 21st-century populist movements, Serwer also argued that cruelty has often featured in human politics and relations.

Specific policies and actions cited in relation to the term include the travel ban for citizens of several Muslim-majority states, Trump administration family separation policy, the response to the COVID-19 pandemic, the January 6 insurrection, and the persecution of transgender people under the second Trump administration.

== Personal life ==
Serwer is married. He and his wife have one daughter (b. 2019). He practices Judaism and lives in San Antonio, Texas.

== Works ==
=== Books ===
- Serwer, Adam (2021b). The Cruelty Is the Point: The Past, Present, and Future of Trump's America. Penguin Random House. ISBN 9780593230800.

=== Essays ===
- Serwer, Adam (June 4, 2017). "The Myth of the Kindly General Lee". The Atlantic. ISSN 1072-7825.
- Serwer, Adam (October 3, 2018). "The Cruelty Is the Point". The Atlantic.
- Serwer, Adam (November 27, 2019). "The War-Crimes President". The Atlantic.
- Serwer, Adam (May 13, 2020). "Birtherism of a Nation". The Atlantic.
- Serwer, Adam (July 18, 2020). "John Lewis was an American Founder". The Atlantic.
- Serwer, Adam (June 3, 2021). "The Capitol Rioters Won". The Atlantic.
- Serwer, Adam (June 9, 2022). "The One Group Who Could Make a Difference on Gun Control." The Atlantic. Retrieved September 4, 2022
- Serwer, Adam (July 23, 2022). "Is Democracy Constitutional?" The Atlantic. Retrieved September 4, 2022.

== Accolades ==
- 2012 – Salute to Excellence Awards, Magazines - Commentary/Essay, "All the President's Frenemies," NABJ
- 2012 – The Root 100, The Root
- 2013 – The Root 100, The Root
- 2015 – Sigma Delta Chi Award Honoree, Online Column Writing, "Race in America," Society of Professional Journalists
- 2018 – The Root 100, Media, The Root
- 2019 – Spring Fellow, Shorenstein Center
- 2019 – Lipman Fellow, Columbia Journalism School
- 2019 – Hillman Prize for Opinion & Analysis Journalism, Hillman Foundation
- 2019 – Forward 50, The Forward (2019)
- 2020 – Vernon Jarrett Medal, Morgan State University
