= Božo Ljubić =

Bosnian Croat politician

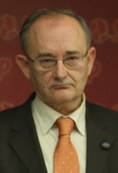
- Ljubić in 2010

President of the Supreme Council of the Croatian National Assembly
- Incumbent
- Assumed office 22 March 2011
- Deputy: Bariša Čolak
- Preceded by: Office established

Minister of Communication and Traffic
- In office 11 January 2007 – 23 June 2009
- Prime Minister: Nikola Špirić
- Preceded by: Branko Dokić
- Succeeded by: Rudo Vidović
Parliamentary offices
Member of the House of Representatives
In office 30 November 2010 – 9 December 2014
Constituency	2nd Electoral Unit
Member of the House of Peoples
In office 23 June 2009 – 9 June 2011

Personal details
- Born: 30 September 1949 (age 77) Široki Brijeg, PR Bosnia and Herzegovina, FPR Yugoslavia
- Party: Independent (2014–present); Croatian Democratic Union 1990 (2006–2014); Croatian Democratic Union (until 2006)
- Spouse: Spomenka Ljubić
- Children: 2

Božo Ljubić (born 30 September 1949) is a Bosnian Croat politician who is the current president of the Supreme Council of the Croatian National Assembly. Formerly, he was a member of both the national House of Peoples and national House of Representatives.

Ljubić served as Minister of Communication and Traffic from 2007 to 2009 as well. He was a prominent figure of the Croatian Democratic Union, until he left it in 2006 to establish the Croatian Democratic Union 1990. Ljubić the party in 2014.

== Biography ==
Ljubić was a member of the Croatian Democratic Union of Bosnia and Herzegovina (HDZ BiH). He came to prominence when in June 2005 he opposed the internal election of Dragan Čović to the party presidency, claiming electoral fraud.

In April 2006, the rift between Ljubić and the main party line escalated, and he led the formation of the Croatian Democratic Union 1990 (HDZ 1990). The new party was welcomed by the Roman Catholic bishop of Banja Luka Franjo Komarica and the president of the Croatian Democratic Union (HDZ) and Croatian prime minister Ivo Sanader.

The new party's candidates ran for office in the 2006 general election and achieved moderate success. Ljubić was the candidate for the Croat seat in the Presidency of Bosnia and Herzegovina, but came in third with 18% of the vote, after both Željko Komšić of the SDP BiH and Ivo Miro Jović of the HDZ BiH.

From 11 January 2007 until 23 June 2009, he served as Minister of Communication and Traffic.

In 2014, Ljubić left the HDZ 1990 and gave his support to the HDZ BiH in the 2014 general election. Currently, he is the president of the General Council of the Croatian National Assembly.

In 2016, the Constitutional Court of Bosnia and Herzegovina granted the request of Ljubić for review of the constitutionality of the Election Law of Bosnia and Herzegovina. The court established that the Election Law is in contravention to the principle of constituent status of peoples, i.e. the principle of equality of all constituent peoples (Croats, Serbs, Bosniaks) in Bosnia and Herzegovina.

Political offices
Preceded by Branko Dokić	Minister of Communication and Traffic; 2007–2009	Succeeded by Rudo Vidović
