= Jacquelyn Serwer =

American art historian and curator

- Born: Florida
- Education: Sarah Lawrence College (BA), University of Chicago (MA), City University of New York (PhD)
- Occupations: Curator, Art Historian at Smithsonian Institution's National Museum of African American History and Culture
- Spouse: Daniel Serwer

Jacquelyn Days Serwer is an American art historian and curator. A specialist in American art and African American art, she is the Chief Curator of the Smithsonian Institution's National Museum of African American History and Culture.

== Life and career ==
Jacquelyn Days was born in Florida but grew up in New Rochelle, New York. She attained her undergraduate degree from Sarah Lawrence College. After earning a master's degree from the University of Chicago, she attained a doctorate in art history from the Graduate Center of the City University of New York in 1981.

In 1985 Serwer became a curator at the Smithsonian's National Museum of American Art. In 1987 she curated an exhibition on the artist Gene Davis, entitled Gene Davis: A Memorial Exhibition.

In 1999 she became the Chief Curator of the Corcoran Gallery of Art. In 2002 she curated the first international retrospective on Pop artist Larry Rivers entitled Larry Rivers: Art and the Artist. Serwer served as the Chief Curator for the Corcoran Gallery of Art for six years.

Serwer has been a key figure in acquiring a collection for the National Museum of African American History and Culture, including an original, used campaign office from the 2008 campaign to elect Barack Obama as President of the United States and photographs of Coretta Scott King.

== Personal life ==
She is married to Daniel Serwer. She has two sons, one of whom is journalist Adam Serwer.
