= Ivan Lovrenović =

Bosnia and Herzegovina journalist, writer, historian, essayist, editor (born 1943)

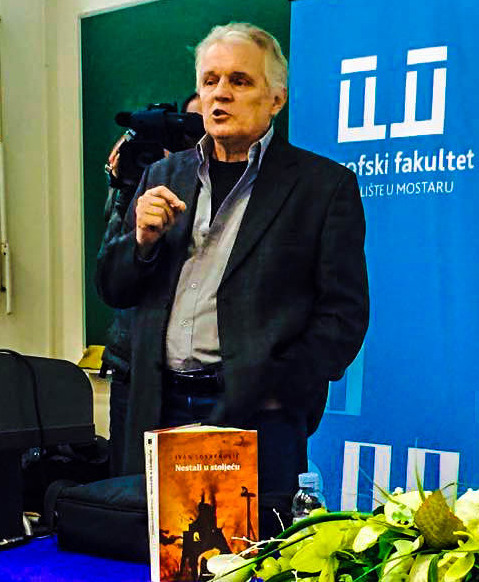
- Born: 18 April 1943 (age 83); Zagreb, Croatia
- Education: University of Zagreb
- Writing career
- Genres: Non-fiction, essays, fiction, poetic prose
- Subjects: History, cultural history, religion, politics
- Notable works: Bosnia: A Cultural History; Bosanski Hrvati - esej o agoniji jedne evropsko-orijentalne mikrokulture; Unutarnja zemlja - kratki pregled kulturne historije Bosne i Hercegovine
- Notable awards: "Meša Selimović" Award for Best Novel
- Website: ivanlovrenovic.com

Ivan Lovrenović (18 April 1943) is a Bosnian and Herzegovinian publicist, writer, historian, essayist, and editor.

== Early life and education ==
He was born in a family of Bosnian Croats in 1943 in Zagreb, but soon moved to Mrkonjić Grad, where he finished elementary school and lower real grammar school, and then return to Zagreb where he finished a grammar school and studied at the Faculty of Philosophy, at the Department of Serbo-Croatian language and Yugoslav literature, taking as an auxiliary discipline ethnology.

== Teaching and diplomatic career ==
Until 1976, he taught literature at the grammar school in Mrkonjić Grad, then worked in Sarajevo as an editor in the magazine for culture and social issues Odjek, and as editor-in-chief in the publishing houses Veselin Masleša and Svjetlost.

Since 1992, after fleeing the occupied Sarajevo district of Grbavica, he has lived in besieged Sarajevo for a year. Since 1993, he has lived in Zagreb and worked as a diplomat at the BiH Embassy, and an editor with the publisher Nenad Popović, and then moved to Berlin.

== Return and engagements ==
After the Dayton Peace Agreement was signed and subsequent reintegration of Grbavica in 1996, he returned to Sarajevo. He lives as an independent publicist, and columnist for the Sarajevo magazine BH Dani, which he co-founded in 1992 with several other prominent writers and publicists.

He was a founding member of P.E.N. Center of Bosnia and Herzegovina, but revoked the membership at his own request on May 19, 2020. disagreeing with the Association decision from May 9 to write and publish a letter protesting the commemorative mass for the Bleiburg massacre in 1945.

== Journalistic work and writing ==
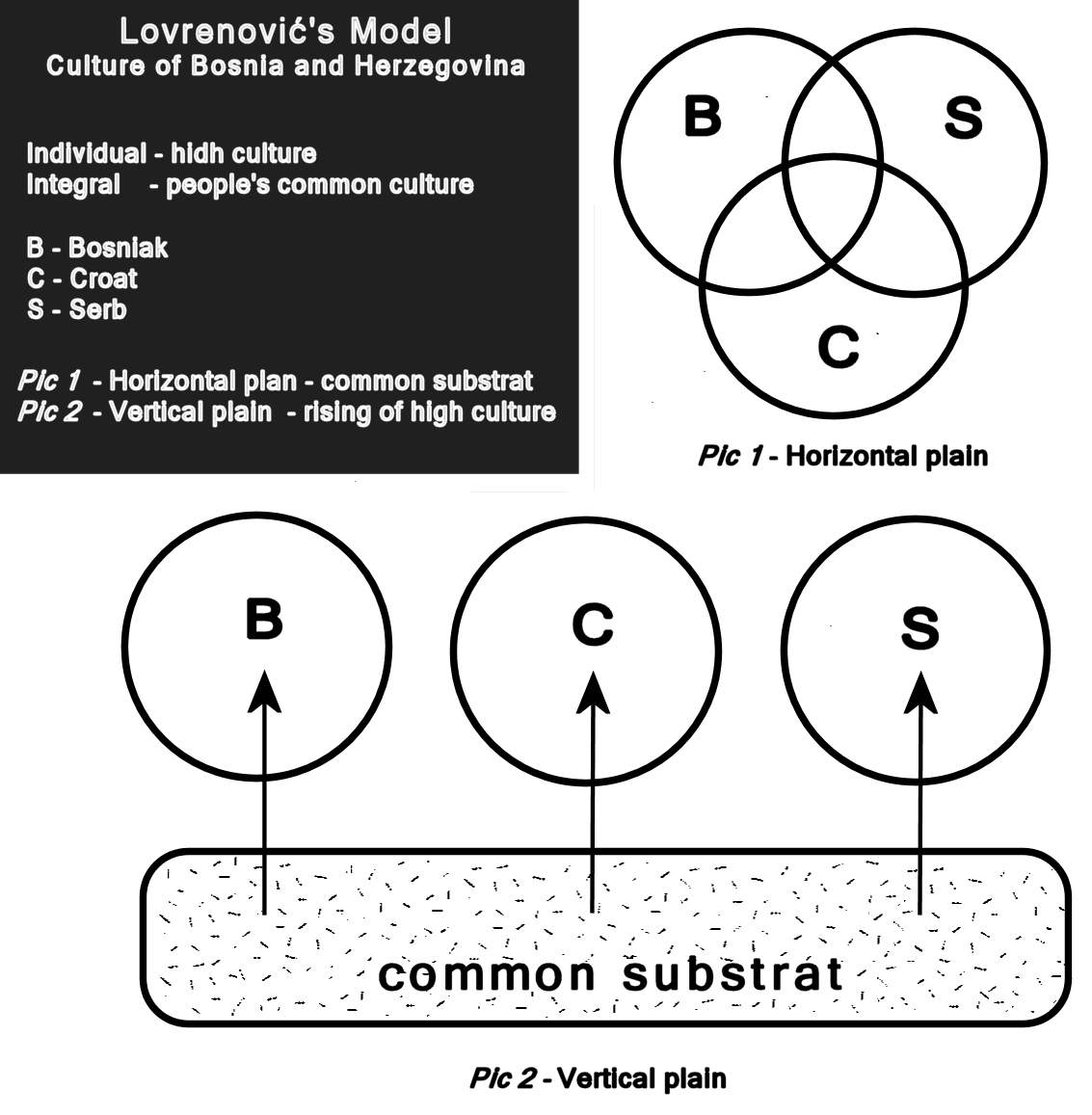
Lovrenović's diagram, from Bosnia and Herzegovina: The Cultural History, explaining how of Bosnia and Herzegovina culture is structured.

He has been publishing literary prose, essays, newspaper articles and commentaries since 1970. He has collaborated in all major newspapers and magazines in Bosnia and Herzegovina and Yugoslavia. His prose, articles and essays have been translated into German, English, Arabic, Russian, French, Spanish, Polish, Czech, Dutch, Slovenian, Macedonian and other languages. From 1992 to 1996, his essays and articles on aspects of ethnic conflict and the war in Bosnia and Herzegovina were published in newspapers and magazines such as New York Times, Frankfurter Rundschau, Frankfurter Algemeine Zeitung, Die Zeit, Le Messager Europeen, etc.

His books on the cultural history of Bosnia and Herzegovina, Bosnia and Herzegovina: The Cultural History and Inner Country have been translated into German, Czech and English.

He has edited and prepared several library editions for the publisher Svjetlost, among other, he published books:

- Bogdan Bogdanović, Knjiga kapitela (1991)
- Jurgis Baltrušaitis, Fantastični srednji vijek (1991)
- Ernst Benz, Duh i život istočne crkve (1991)
- Koran (preveo Mićo Ljubibratić), reprint izdanja iz 1895. godine (1990)
- Julijan Jelenić, Kultura i bosanski franjevci I-II, reprint izdanja iz 1912–15. (1990)
- Anto Kovačić, Biobibliografija franjevaca Bosne Srebrene (1991)
- Nerkez Smailagić, Leksikon islama (1990)

He was a member of the editorial board of the magazine for the culture of democracy Erasmus in Zagreb, and one of the founders and editors of the independent news magazine Tjednik. He started and edited twenty issues of the Sarajevo magazine for culture, science, society and politics, Forum Bosnae. Between 1993 and 1997, he edited with Nenad Popović the edition of Bosnian exile literature Ex Ponto at the Zagreb publishing house Durieux. He edited the BH Dani literary library, in which 60 books were published during 2004–2005. With the Sarajevo-Zagreb publisher Synopsis, he started and edited the library From Bosnia Srebrena, a selected writings of Bosnian Franciscans from the 17th to the 20th century in twenty volumes.

He was a co-signatory of an open letter with four other Bosnian Croat intellectuals, Ivo Komšić, Miljenko Jergović, Mile Stojić and Ivan Kordić, sent from Sarajevo on 6 January 1992 to Croatian President Franjo Tudjman, describing him as a political figure "responsible for the political destruction of Bosnia and Herzegovina".

== P. E. N. Bosnia and Herzegovina ==
Ivan Lovrenović, together with several Bosnian writers, was one of the co-founders of the Bosnian P.E.N. Center on October 31, 1992, in Sarajevo.

After the letter of the Association, signed by 42 members and published on May 9, 2020, protesting the commemorative Mass for the Bleiburg massacre in 1945 in the Cathedral of the Sacred Heart of Jesus in Sarajevo on May 16, 2020, Lovrenović with Ivica Đikić, Miljenkom Jergovićem, and Željkom Ivankovićem in an open letter published on Lovrenovic's website, stated that he does not consider himself a member of this association anymore. One of the reasons cited in the letter was both Association and the Sarajevo administration alleged tolerance of nationalism and fascism, which allows the glorification of the Ustasha movement through naming the streets using movement sympathizers and members names.

== Bibliography ==
Books:

- Obašašća i basanja, poetska proza (Sarajevo 1975, Zagreb 2004)
- Putovanje Ivana Frane Jukića, roman (Mostar 1977, Sarajevo 1984, Zagreb 2003, Banja Luka 2005)
- Bosna i Hercegovina, ilustrovana monografija (Sarajevo 1980)
- Književnost bosanskih franjevaca, hrestomatija (Sarajevo 1982)
- Skice, lajtmotivi, eseji' (Banja Luka 1986)
- Labirint i pamćenje, kulturnohistorijski esej o Bosni (Sarajevo 1989, 1990, Klagenfurt 1994)
- Liber memorabilium, roman (Zagreb 1994, 2003)
- Ex tenebris, sarajevski dnevnik (Zagreb 1994)
- Welt ohne Brücke – Svijet bez mosta, eseji (Berlin 1994)
- Bosna, kraj stoljeća, eseji, članci' (Zagreb 1996)
- Unutarnja zemlja - kratki pregled kulturne historije Bosne i Hercegovine' (Zagreb 1998, 1999, 2004)
- Bosnien und Herzegowina: Eine Kulturgeschichte' (Bozen-Wien 1998)
- Bosna a Hercegovina: Kratky prehled kulturni historie' (Praha 2000)
- Bosnia: A Cultural History, predgovor: Ammiel Alcalay (London-New York 2001)
- Bosanski Hrvati - esej o agoniji jedne evropsko-orijentalne mikrokulture' (Zagreb 2002)
- Ex tenebris, eseji, članci, razgovori (Zagreb 2005)
- Duh iz Sindžira, članci, eseji, polemike (Zagreb 2005)
- Poslije kraja (kronike)' (Zagreb 2005)
- Sedam dana po Bosni' (Zagreb 2009)
- Bosna i Hercegovina - Budućnost nezavršenog rata; (sa Miljenkom Jergovićem) Novi liber, Zagreb 2010. ISBN 978-953-6045-07-5

Anthologies:

- Antologija bosanskohercegovačke pripovijetke XX vijeka, s Enverom Kazazom i Nikolom Kovačem (Sarajevo 2000)
- Za gradom jabuka, 200 najljepših sevdalinki' (Sarajevo 2005)

Texts for documentaries:

- Sto godina Zemaljskog muzeja u Sarajevu' (1989)
- Stoljeća Bosne Srebrene' (1990)

== Awards ==
- 2014. - Nagrada "Meša Selimović", Nestali u stoljeću - for best novel.
