= Daniel Serwer =

American diplomat and academic

Daniel P. Serwer is a Senior Fellow at the Foreign Policy Institute of the Johns Hopkins School of Advanced International Studies (SAIS). He was previously professor of Practice of Conflict Management as well as director of the Conflict Management and American Foreign Policy programs at SAIS. Serwer is also a research scholar at the Middle East Institute in Washington D.C.

Serwer served as a minister-counselor with the U.S. Department of State. He was deputy chief of mission and chargé d'affaires at US Embassy Rome from 1990 to 1993 and from 1994 to 1996, special envoy and coordinator for the Federation of Bosnia and Herzegovina. During this posting, Serwer mediated between Croats and Bosniaks to build the institutions of the Federation, and negotiated the first agreement reached at the 1995 Dayton peace talks.

Between 1998 and 2010 Serwer was a vice-president at the United States Institute of Peace. During that time he led the USIP's peace-building work in Iraq, Afghanistan, Sudan and the Balkans. At USIP, Serwer specialized in preventing inter-ethnic and sectarian conflict. He was also the Executive Director of the Hamilton/Baker Iraq Study Group.

Serwer is the author of Strengthening International Regimes: the Case of Radiation Protection (Palgrave MacMillan, 2024), From War to Peace in the Balkans, the Middle East, and Ukraine (Palgrave MacMillan, 2019), Righting the Balance: How You Can Help Protect America (Potomac, 2013) and editor with David Smock of Facilitating Dialogue (USIP, 2012). He regularly blogs on foreign policy at www.peacefare.net.

== Personal life ==
He is married to art curator Jacquelyn Serwer, with whom he has two sons. His son, Adam Serwer, is a political journalist. Jared Serwer is an architect with Perkins and Will in Atlanta.
