= Hungarian National Council of Transylvania =

Romanian civic organization

- Erdélyi Magyar Nemzeti Tanács / Consiliul Național al Maghiarilor din Transilvania
- Type: NGO
- Headquarters: Oradea
- Region served: Transylvania
- Leader: László Tőkés
- Website: emnt.org

The Hungarian National Council of Transylvania (Hungarian: Erdélyi Magyar Nemzeti Tanács, EMNT; Romanian: Consiliul Național al Maghiarilor din Transilvania, CNMT) is a civic organization that represents the ethnic Hungarians of Romania. Established in 2003, its chairman is László Tőkés. The organisation intends to present, represent and move the case of Hungarian autonomy in Transylvania.

In 2009, the coalition between UDMR and Hungarian National Council of Transylvania resulted in nine percent of the votes in the European Parliamentary elections which meant three Romanian EP seats.
