= 1997–1998 crisis in Republika Srpska =

Political crisis in Bosnia and Herzegovina

- Part of the aftermath of the Bosnian War
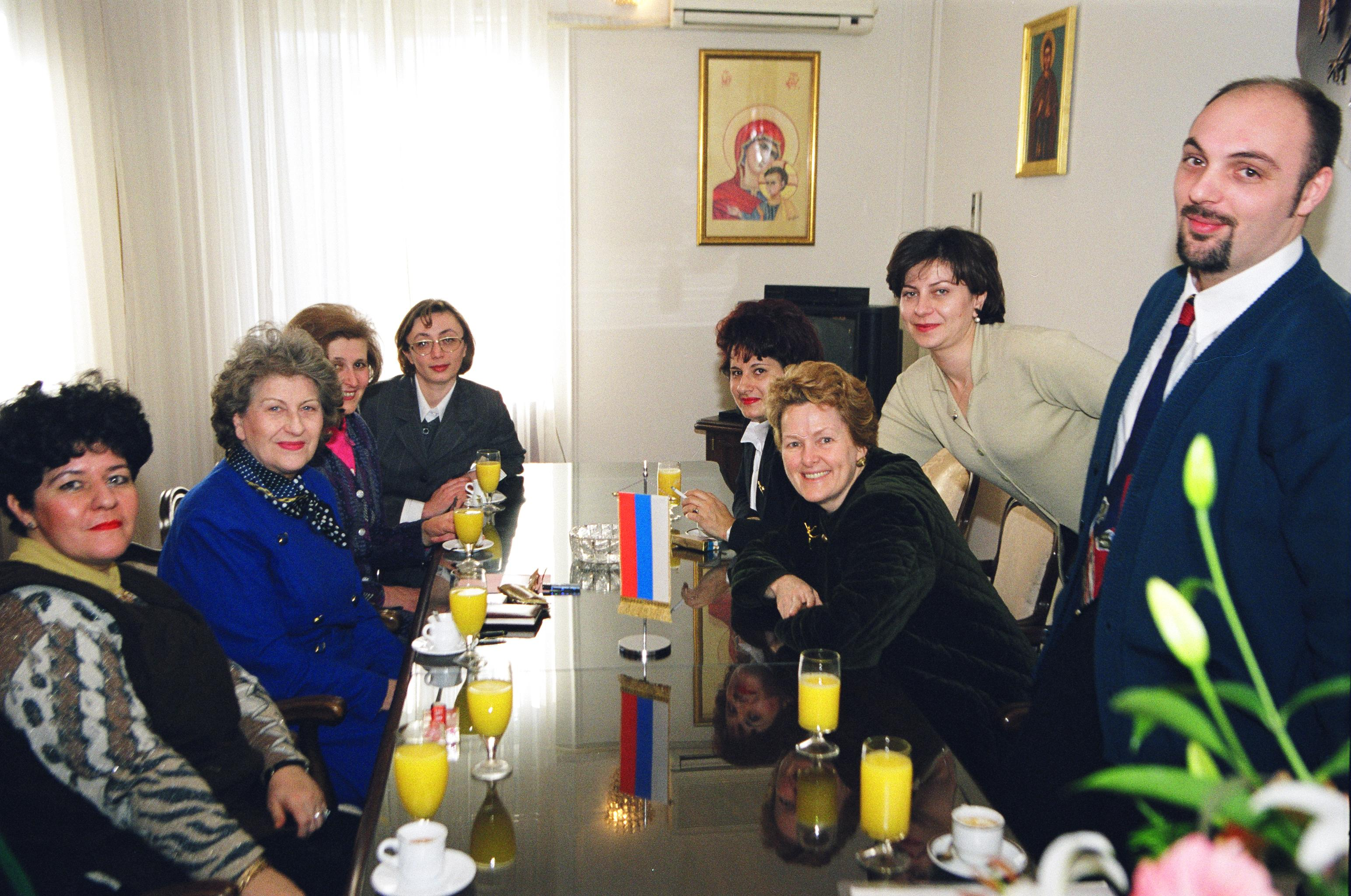
- Biljana Plavšić (second from the left) at her office in Banja Luka. Plavšić moved the Presidential office from Pale to Banja Luka, a move which caused outrage among her former colleagues from the SDS
- Date: 3 July 1997 – 18 January 1998 (6 months, 2 weeks and 1 day)
- Location: Republika Srpska, Bosnia and Herzegovina
- Result: Pro-Plavšić faction prevailed

Parties
President; SNSD; SNS; Part of the Police; Supported by: United States	Government; National Assembly; SDS; SRS RS; Part of the Police

Lead figures
Banja Luka Group: Biljana Plavšić; Milorad Dodik; Support: Madeleine Albright	Pale Group: Radovan Karadžić; Momčilo Krajišnik; Gojko Kličković; Dragan Kalinić; Dragan Kijac

The 1997–1998 crisis in Republika Srpska was caused by a political conflict between the reformist faction led by the President of Republika Srpska, Biljana Plavšić, and the hardline nationalist one led by former President Radovan Karadžić and his associates from the governing Serb Democratic Party. The crisis was resolved by an early election and a victory of the opposition and Plavšić.

== Conflict ==
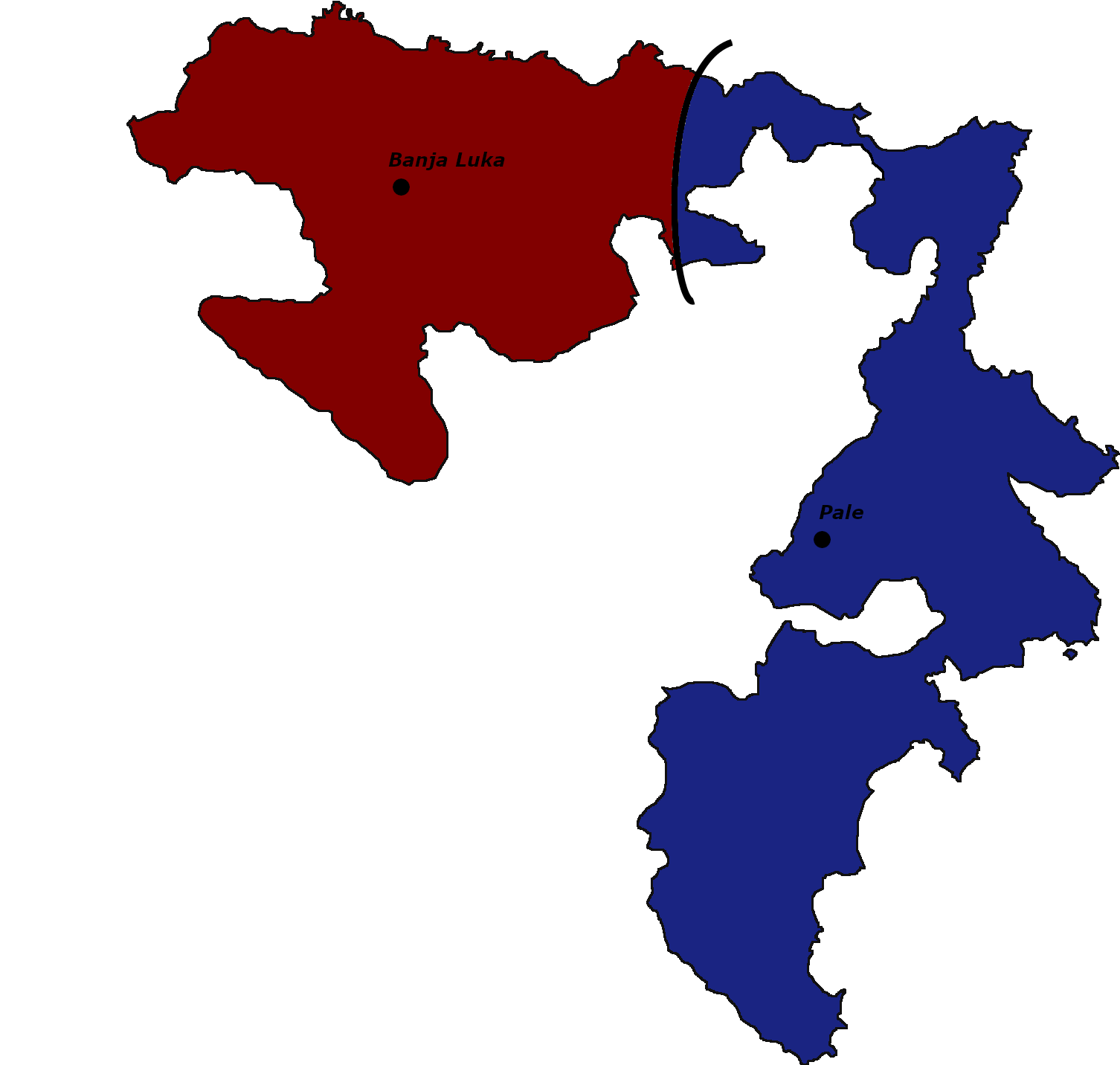
During the crisis, Republika Srpska was de facto separated into two parts: The northern part of the entity was led by president Biljana Plavšić from Banja Luka, while the eastern part was led by Radovan Karadžić and Momčilo Krajišnik from Pale

The wartime leader of the Bosnian Serbs, Radovan Karadžić, resigned amid international pressure as President of Republika Srpska. In the first post-war elections held in 1996, Karadžić's Serb Democratic Party (SDS) won as expected. In the elections for the Presidency of Bosnia and Herzegovina, Momčilo Krajišnik (SDS), the previous president of the National Assembly, and during the war, the second most influential political figure in Republika Srpska, won. Gojko Kličković became Prime Minister, while Dragan Kalinić was elected President of the National Assembly. At the same time, in the presidential elections, former member of the Presidency of SR of Bosnia and Herzegovina and Vice President of Republika Srpska, Biljana Plavšić, became the first female leader of any Serb entity in history. She soon came into conflict with Krajišnik and Karadžić, who, even after retiring from all state and party duties, remained very influential. The conflict was primarily on the line of formal and informal power, but also the transition from wartime to peacetime conditions. The antagonisms between the eastern and western parts of Republika Srpska and the issue of the capital, which was moved from the war location in Pale, in violation of the constitution, to Banja Luka, also came to light.

The National Assembly, elected in the 1996 general election, was dissolved on 3 July 1997 by Republika Srpska president Biljana Plavšić. The Assembly did not accept that dissolution and continued its work by passing acts that would later be annulled. The Assembly voted on 5 July to strip Plavšić of her powers and transfer them to the supreme defence council. Plavšić, meanwhile, met with US special envoy for the former Yugoslavia Peter Galbraith in Banja Luka and continued solidifying her support from the international community.

In the spring of 1997, Republika Srpska entered a state of political crisis. The republican police was divided, the eastern part supported Krajišnik and the majority of the SDS, while the western part supported Plavšić. Riots broke out in Banja Luka in September, with protesters allegedly trying to take over the Presidential Palace and entity television. Plavšić accused the leadership of SDS and pro-Karadžić supporters for a coup attempt.

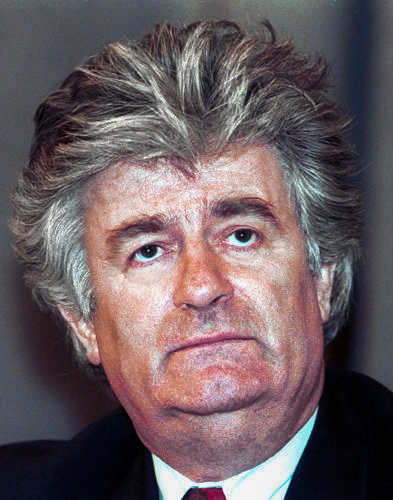
Radovan Karadžić, the wartime leader of Republika Srpska

The United States State Department also accused Bosnian Serb hardliners of staging a "second coup attempt" against Plavšić. They said that aides to indicted war criminal Radovan Karadžić dispatched hundreds of armed loyalists to confront their rivals under the guise of a political rally. State Department spokesman James Foley said an earlier coup attempt occurred several weeks before the Banja Luka protests when NATO forces and international police officials discovered significant wiretapping, arms caches, and terrorist apparatus in police headquarters in Banja Luka. He said this second coup attempt was disguised as a political rally in Plavšić's stronghold. But Foley told reporters, in reality, the rally was an effort to overturn Plavšić's political authority.

One policeman was shot as NATO troops prevented over 50 busloads of Karadžić loyalists from reaching the rally in Banja Luka. Only about 150 people ended up attending the anti-Plavšić demonstration. A spokesman for the Organisation for Security and Cooperation in Europe said the coup attempt would not affect elections in the region. Lieutenant-colonel Mike Wright, spokesman for the NATO-led international SFOR peacekeepers maintained control throughout the attempted coup. He also said that the SFOR confiscated dozens of weapons from Momčilo Krajišnik's bodyguards who were trapped in the Banja Luka's Hotel Bosnia by a pro-Plavšic crowd. In total, 37 weapons were confiscated including 22 long-barrel weapons. The SFOR Spokesman further added that Government ministers in the hotel, including Krajišnik, initially refused to be evacuated. They were eventually taken to a NATO base. The President of Serbia, Slobodan Milošević, summoned both Plavšić and Krajišnik to Belgrade on 25 September in an attempt to resolve the crisis.

== Outcome ==
In the extraordinary parliamentary elections in 1997, the united opposition led by the Serbian National Alliance, a party formed in the meantime by Plavšić, the Socialist Party, led by Drago Ilić and Živko Radišić, and the Alliance of Independent Social Democrats, founded a year earlier by Milorad Dodik, won. At the suggestion of Plavšić, the National Assembly elected Milorad Dodik as Prime Minister, even though his party had only two MPs at the time. Plavšić and Dodik had the support of the United States for carrying reforms and expulsion from the political life of then-suspected war criminals, including Radovan Karadžić.

== Aftermath ==
Biljana Plavšić lost the 1998 Republika Srpska presidential election to Nikola Poplašen of the Serbian Radical Party of Republika Srpska, who was supported by the Serb Democratic Party as well. However, in September 1999, Poplašen was removed from office by the High Representative for Bosnia and Herzegovina, Carlos Westendorp, after refusing to nominate Milorad Dodik as Prime Minister, opting instead for Momčilo Krajišnik and Dragan Kalinić.
