= 1996 Republika Srpska general election =

- 14 September 1996
- Presidential election
- Turnout: 57.47%
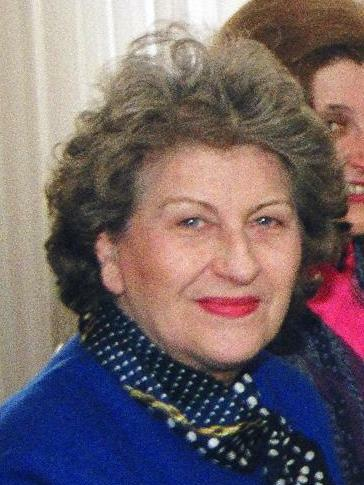

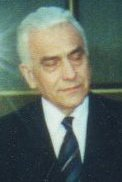
Candidate	Biljana Plavšić	Adib Đozić	Živko Radišić
Party	SDS	SDA	NSSM
Popular vote	636,654	197,389	168.024
Percentage	59.19%	18.35%	15.62%
President before election
Biljana Plavšić
SDS
Elected President
Biljana Plavšić
SDS
- Parliamentary election
Party	Leader	Vote %	Seats
SDS	Aleksa Buha	52.31	45
SDA	Alija Izetbegović	16.31	14
NSSM	Živko Radišić	11.53	10
SRS RS	Nikola Poplašen	6.67	6
DPB		3.02	2
SBiH	Haris Silajdžić	2.35	2
SDP coalition	Nijaz Duraković	2.05	2
SSK		1.60	1
SPS		1.33	1
This lists parties that won seats. See the complete results below.
Prime Minister before	Prime Minister after
Gojko Kličković; SDS	Gojko Kličković; SDS

General elections were held for the first time in Republika Srpska on 14 September 1996. They were the first direct elections in Republika Srpska since its proclamation in 1992 and Bosnian War that ended in 1995. Previous National Assembly was created in 1991 and was made up of Serb MPs that were elected to the Socialist Republic of Bosnia and Herzegovina Parliament following 1990 Bosnian general election. Presidential election were held simultaneously because incumbent President Radovan Karadžić resigned in 1996 due to international pressure.

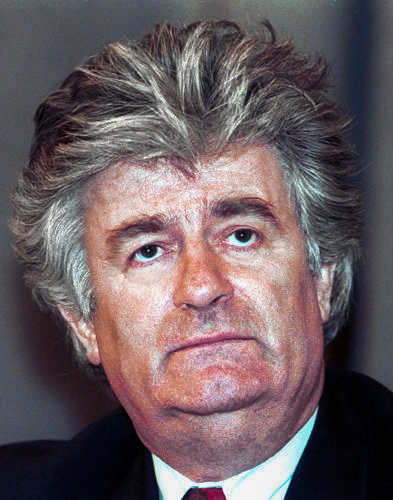
Radovan Karadžić, wartime President of Republika Srpska, resigned in 1996 amid international pressure

Biljana Plavšić, who succeeded Karadžić as Srpska's president, won absolute majority of votes, with Bosniak Adib Đozić finishing as runner-up. On parliamentary election, Plavšić's and Karadžić's Serb Democratic Party, that led Republika Srpska throughout Bosnian War, won and incumbent Prime Minister Gojko Kličković formed his second cabinet.

== Results ==
=== President ===
Candidate	Party	Votes	%
Biljana Plavšić	Serb Democratic Party	636,654	59.19
Adib Đozić	Party of Democratic Action	197,389	18.35
Živko Radišić	People's Alliance for Free Peace	168,024	15.62
Predrag Radić	Democratic Patriotic Bloc	44,755	4.16
Slavko Lisica	Serb Patriotic Party	20,050	1.86
Ljiljana Perić	Party of Serbian Unity	5,642	0.52
Dragan Đokanović	Democratic Party of Federalists	3,067	0.29
Total		1,075,581	100.00
Valid votes		1,075,581	95.28
Invalid/blank votes		53,320	4.72
Total votes		1,128,901	100.00
Registered voters/turnout			57.47
Source: RZS

=== Parliament ===
Party	Votes	%	Seats
Serb Democratic Party	568,980	52.31	45
Party of Democratic Action	177,388	16.31	14
People's Alliance for Free Peace	125,372	11.53	10
Serbian Radical Party	72,517	6.67	6
Democratic Patriotic Bloc	32,895	3.02	2
Party for Bosnia and Herzegovina	25,593	2.35	2
Social Democratic Party coalition	22,329	2.05	2
Serb Party of Krajina and Posavina	17,381	1.60	1
Serb Patriotic Party	14,508	1.33	1
Other parties	30,800	2.83	0
Total	1,087,763	100.00	83
Valid votes	1,087,763	96.02	
Invalid/blank votes	45,055	3.98	
Total votes	1,132,818	100.00	
Source: RZS
