= Branko Đerić =

Bosnian Serb politician (born 1948)

- Бранко Ђерић

Prime Minister of Republika Srpska
- In office 22 April 1992 – 20 January 1993
- President: Radovan Karadžić
- Preceded by: Office established
- Succeeded by: Vladimir Lukić

Personal details
- Born: 20 November 1948 (age 77) Rogatica, PR Bosnia and Herzegovina, FPR Yugoslavia
- Party: Serb Democratic Party (1992—1993)

Branko Đerić (Serbian Cyrillic: Бранко Ђерић; born 20 November 1948) is a Bosnian Serb politician who served as the first prime minister of Republika Srpska from 1992 to 1993.

== Biography ==
Đerić was born in Berkovići, Rogatica, PR Bosnia and Herzegovina, FPR Yugoslavia, on 20 November 1948. He graduated from the University of Sarajevo in 1972. He defended his master's thesis at the Faculty of Economics of the University of Belgrade in 1977. He graduated from the Faculty of Economics of the University of Belgrade in 1981.

On 22 April 1992, the Serb Democratic Party nominated Đerić as the first prime minister of Republika Srpska.

He was hired at the University of East Sarajevo in 1994. He became a full professor in 1996.

Political offices
New title	Prime Minister of Republika Srpska; 1992–1993	Succeeded by Vladimir Lukić
