= Vladimir Lukić =

Bosnian Serb politician (1933–2026)

- Владимир Лукић

Prime Minister of Republika Srpska
- In office 20 January 1993 – 18 August 1994
- President: Radovan Karadžić
- Preceded by: Branko Đerić
- Succeeded by: Dušan Kozić

Member of the Senate of Republika Srpska
- In office 2009–2026

Personal details
- Born: 7 April 1933 Donji Dabar, Kingdom of Yugoslavia
- Died: 2 January 2026 (aged 92) Banja Luka, Bosnia and Herzegovina
- Party: SDS
- Education: University of Zagreb (DS)
- Occupation: Academic

Vladimir Lukić (Serbian: Владимир Лукић; 7 April 1933 – 2 January 2026) was a Bosnian Serb politician. A member of the Serb Democratic Party, he served as prime minister of Republika Srpska from 1993 to 1994.

Lukić died in Banja Luka on 2 January 2026, at the age of 92.

Political offices
Preceded by Branko Đerić	Prime Minister of Republika Srpska; 1993–1994	Succeeded by Dušan Kozić
