= 2000 Republika Srpska general election =

- 11 November 2000
- Presidential election
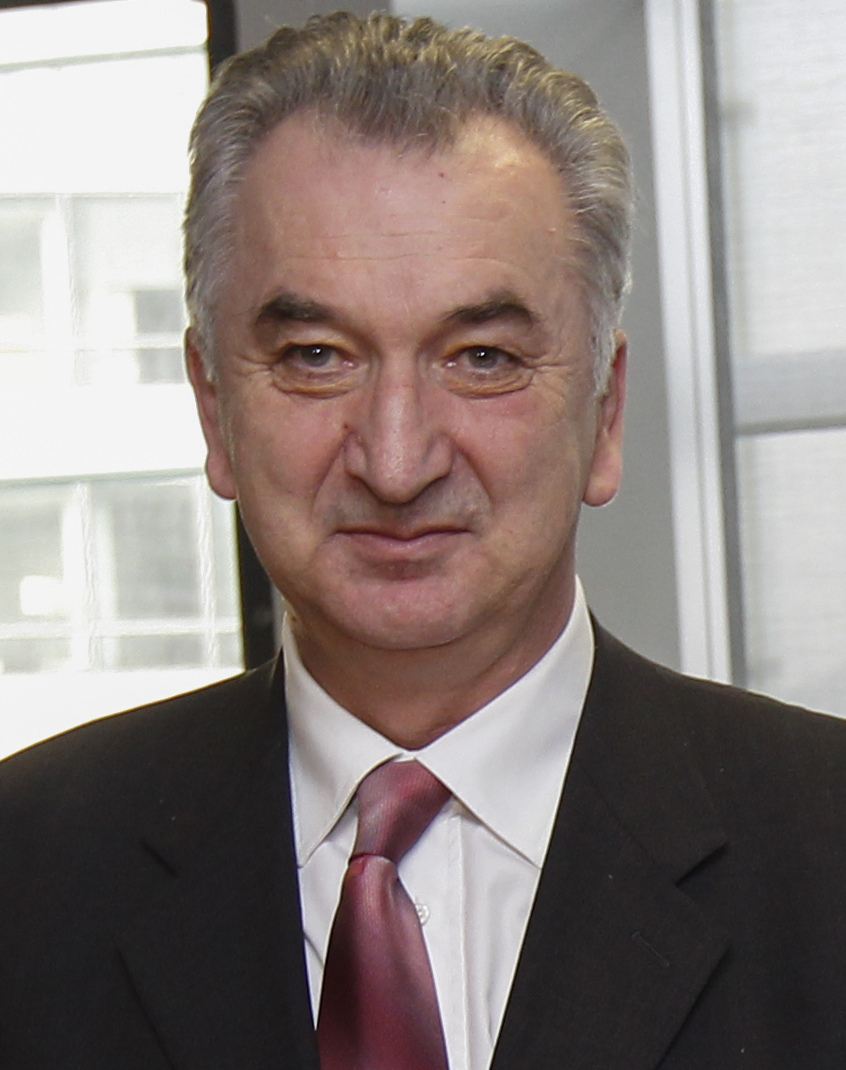

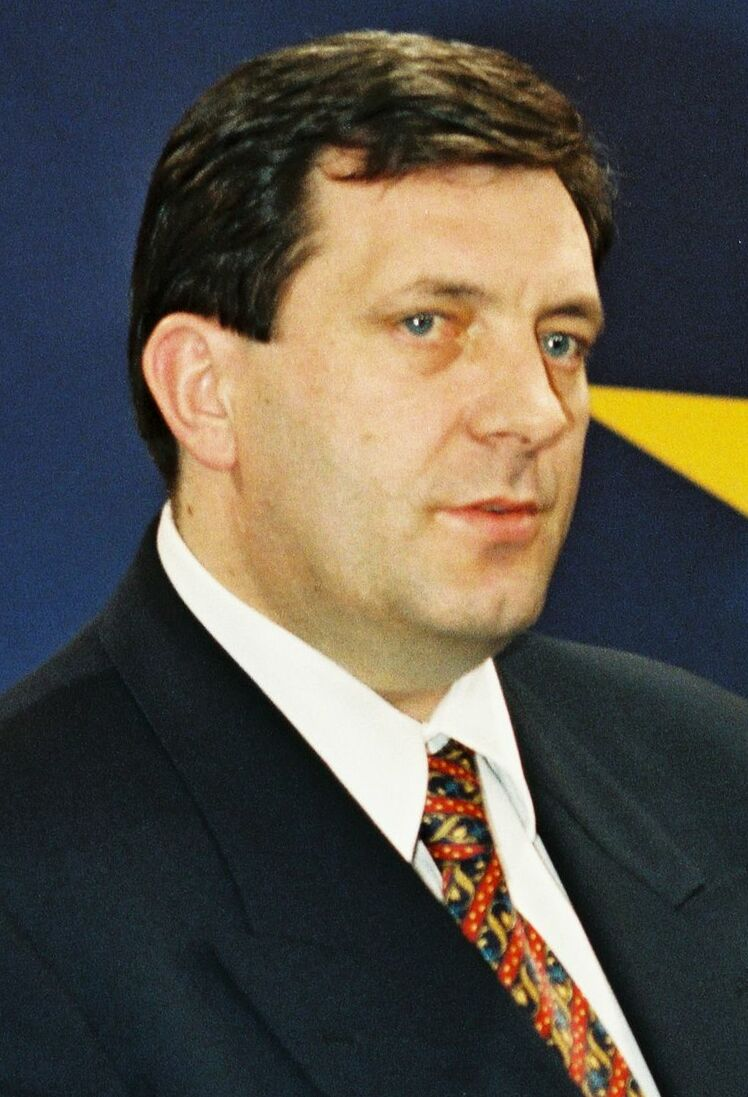
Candidate	Mirko Šarović	Milorad Dodik
Party	SDS	SNSD
Popular vote	313,607	162,154
Percentage	50.14%	25.93%
President before election
Petar Đokić
(acting)
SP RS
Elected President
Mirko Šarović
SDS
- National Assembly election
- 83 seats in the National Assembly; 42 seats needed for a majority
Party	Leader	Vote %	Seats	+/–
SDS	Dragan Kalinić	36.09	31	+12
SNSD	Milorad Dodik	13.00	11	+5
PDP	Mladen Ivanić	12.25	11	New
SDA	Alija Izetbegović	7.56	6	−9
SBiH	Haris Silajdžić	5.18	4	New
SDP BiH	Zlatko Lagumdžija	4.97	4	+2
SP	Živko Radišić	4.89	4	−6
DSP	Nebojša Radmanović	4.11	4	New
DNS	Dragan Kostić	3.52	3	New
SNS	Biljana Plavšić	2.27	2	−10
PUP		1.33	1	+1
NHI	Krešimir Zubak	0.73	1	0
DS		0.62	1	New
This lists parties that won seats. See the complete results below.
Prime Minister before	Prime Minister after
Milorad Dodik; SNSD	Mladen Ivanić; PDP

General elections were held in Republika Srpska on 11 November 2000 alongside nationwide parliamentary elections. They were the third general elections in Republika Srpska since the end of Bosnian War.

After refusing to nominate Milorad Dodik as prime minister, President Nikola Poplašen was deposed in 1999 after less than a year in position by Carlos Westendorp, the High Representative for Bosnia and Herzegovina. Petar Đokić was named acting president until election. In the meantime Poplašen's Serbian Radical Party was banned from elections.

The presidential election was won by Mirko Šarović from the Serb Democratic Party, who had been in power during the war years. The runner-up was Prime Minister Milorad Dodik.

In the parliamentary election, the Serb Democratic Party won the most seats for the fourth time in a row. However, unlike the past two election cycles, they managed to form a government, with Mladen Ivanić from Party of Democratic Progress elected as the new prime minister.

== Results ==
=== President ===
Candidate	Party	First preferences		First transfer	
Candidate	Party	Votes	%	Votes	%
Mirko Šarović	Serb Democratic Party	313,572	49.82	313,607	50.14
Milorad Dodik	Alliance of Independent Social Democrats	161,942	25.73	162,154	25.93
Momčilo Tepić	Party of Democratic Progress	54,392	8.64	54,433	8.70
Slobodan Popović	Social Democratic Party	48,992	7.78	52,411	8.38
Zijad Mujkić	Civic Democratic Party	37,614	5.98	42,834	6.85
Aljo Dugonjić	Bosnian Party	12,851	2.04		
Total		629,363	100.00	625,439	100.00
Source: CEC

=== Parliament ===
Party	Votes	%	Seats	+/–
Serb Democratic Party	226,226	36.09	31	+12
Alliance of Independent Social Democrats	81,467	13.00	11	+5
Party of Democratic Progress	76,810	12.25	11	New
Party of Democratic Action	47,379	7.56	6	–9
Party for Bosnia and Herzegovina	32,450	5.18	4	New
Social Democratic Party	31,176	4.97	4	+2
Socialist Party	30,636	4.89	4	–6
Democratic Socialist Party	25,763	4.11	4	New
Democratic People's Alliance	22,083	3.52	3	New
Serb National Alliance	14,239	2.27	2	–10
Party of United Pensioners	8,363	1.33	1	+1
New Croatian Initiative	4,590	0.73	1	0
Democratic Party	3,876	0.62	1	New
Other parties	21,804	3.48	0	–
Total	626,862	100.00	83	0
Valid votes	626,862	92.65		
Invalid/blank votes	49,735	7.35		
Total votes	676,597	100.00		
Registered voters/turnout	1,104,969	61.23		
Source: RZS, National Assembly, CEC
