= List of prime ministers of Republika Srpska =

Prime Minister of Republika Srpska
- Предсједник Владе Републике Српске; Predsjednik Vlade Republike Srpske
- Seal of Republika Srpska
- Incumbent; Anđelka Kuzmić; Acting since 9 November 2026
- Residence: Banja Luka
- Nominator: President of Republika Srpska
- Appointer: National Assembly of Republika Srpska
- Inaugural holder: Branko Đerić
- Formation: 22 April 1992; 34 years ago

This article lists the prime ministers of Republika Srpska, the head of the government of Republika Srpska.

The prime minister is nominated by the President of Republika Srpska, and appointed by the National Assembly of Republika Srpska.

== List of officeholders ==
Serb Democratic Party Alliance of Independent Social Democrats Party of Democratic Progress Independent

No.	Portrait	Name (Birth–Death)	Term of office	Time in office	Party	Cabinet	Election	President
1		Branko Đerić; Бранко Ђерић (born 1948)	22 April 1992 – 20 January 1993	273 days	Serb Democratic Party	Đerić	—	Radovan Karadžić (1992–1996)
2		Vladimir Lukić; Владимир Лукић (1933–2026)	20 January 1993 – 18 August 1994	1 year, 210 days	Serb Democratic Party	Lukić	—	Radovan Karadžić (1992–1996)
3		Dušan Kozić; Душан Козић (born 1958)	18 August 1994 – 16 October 1995	1 year, 59 days	Serb Democratic Party	Kozić	—	Radovan Karadžić (1992–1996)
4		Rajko Kasagić; Рајко Касагић (1942–2026)	16 October 1995 – 18 May 1996	215 days	Serb Democratic Party	Kasagić	—	Radovan Karadžić (1992–1996)
5		Gojko Kličković; Гојко Кличковић (born 1955)	18 May 1996 – 31 January 1998	1 year, 258 days	Serb Democratic Party	Kličković I	—	Radovan Karadžić (1992–1996)
5		Gojko Kličković; Гојко Кличковић (born 1955)	18 May 1996 – 31 January 1998	1 year, 258 days	Serb Democratic Party	Kličković II	1996	Biljana Plavšić (1996–1998)
6		Milorad Dodik; Милорад Додик (born 1959)	31 January 1998 – 16 January 2001	2 years, 351 days	Alliance of Independent Social Democrats	Dodik I	1998	Biljana Plavšić (1996–1998)
6		Milorad Dodik; Милорад Додик (born 1959)	31 January 1998 – 16 January 2001	2 years, 351 days	Alliance of Independent Social Democrats	Dodik I	1998	Nikola Poplašen (1998–1999)
6		Milorad Dodik; Милорад Додик (born 1959)	31 January 1998 – 16 January 2001	2 years, 351 days	Alliance of Independent Social Democrats	Dodik I	1998	Mirko Šarović (2000–2002)
7		Mladen Ivanić; Младен Иванић (born 1958)	16 January 2001 – 17 January 2003	2 years, 1 day	Party of Democratic Progress	Ivanić	2000	Mirko Šarović (2000–2002)
7		Mladen Ivanić; Младен Иванић (born 1958)	16 January 2001 – 17 January 2003	2 years, 1 day	Party of Democratic Progress	Ivanić	2000	Dragan Čavić (2002–2006)
8		Dragan Mikerević; Драган Микеревић (born 1955)	17 January 2003 – 17 February 2005	2 years, 31 days	Party of Democratic Progress	Mikerević	2002	Dragan Čavić (2002–2006)
9		Pero Bukejlović; Перо Букејловић (born 1946)	17 February 2005 – 26 February 2006	1 year, 9 days	Serb Democratic Party	Bukejlović	2002	Dragan Čavić (2002–2006)
(6)		Milorad Dodik; Милорад Додик (born 1959)	26 February 2006 – 15 November 2010	4 years, 262 days	Alliance of Independent Social Democrats	Dodik II	2002	Dragan Čavić (2002–2006)
(6)		Milorad Dodik; Милорад Додик (born 1959)	26 February 2006 – 15 November 2010	4 years, 262 days	Alliance of Independent Social Democrats	Dodik III	2006	Milan Jelić (2006–2007†)
(6)		Milorad Dodik; Милорад Додик (born 1959)	26 February 2006 – 15 November 2010	4 years, 262 days	Alliance of Independent Social Democrats	Dodik III	2006	Rajko Kuzmanović (2007–2010)
—		Anton Kasipović; Антон Касиповић (born 1956)	15 November 2010 – 29 December 2010	44 days	Independent	Acting	2006	Milorad Dodik (2010–2018)
10		Aleksandar Džombić; Александар Џомбић (born 1968)	29 December 2010 – 12 March 2013	2 years, 73 days	Alliance of Independent Social Democrats	Džombić	2010	Milorad Dodik (2010–2018)
11		Željka Cvijanović; Жељка Цвијановић (born 1967)	12 March 2013 – 19 November 2018	5 years, 252 days	Alliance of Independent Social Democrats	Cvijanović I	2010	Milorad Dodik (2010–2018)
11		Željka Cvijanović; Жељка Цвијановић (born 1967)	12 March 2013 – 19 November 2018	5 years, 252 days	Alliance of Independent Social Democrats	Cvijanović II	2014	Milorad Dodik (2010–2018)
—		Srebrenka Golić; Сребренка Голић (born 1958)	19 November 2018 – 18 December 2018	29 days	Alliance of Independent Social Democrats	Acting	2014	Željka Cvijanović (2018–2022)
12		Radovan Višković; Радован Вишковић (born 1964)	18 December 2018 – 2 September 2025	6 years, 258 days	Alliance of Independent Social Democrats	Višković I	2018	Željka Cvijanović (2018–2022)
12		Radovan Višković; Радован Вишковић (born 1964)	18 December 2018 – 2 September 2025	6 years, 258 days	Alliance of Independent Social Democrats	Višković II	2022	Milorad Dodik (2022–2025)
13		Savo Minić; Саво Минић (born 1974)	2 September 2025 (Note: The election of the government of Republika Srpska, headed by Minić, and the process of its appointment was considered illegal and unconstitutional according to the Constitution of Republika Srpska due to Milorad Dodik, who was forbade from political activity for six years by the Court of Bosnia and Herzegovina, proposing a prime minister without legal authority. This violated the Constitution of Republika Srpska and the Election Law of Bosnia and Herzegovina, as the Central Election Commission ordered Dodik's removal on 6 August 2025. On 18 August, his appeal against the decision of the Central Election Commission was rejected and his mandate as Republika Srpska president was officially terminated. The termination date was marked as 12 June 2025, due to the Bosnian state court's verdict becoming legally binding on that day. For this reason, it was considered that Minić's government initially lacked legal legitimacy, despite its majority support in the National Assembly of Republika Srpska. As a result, Minić submitted his resignation on 16 March 2026. He was subsequently re-nominated by Siniša Karan, who had been elected president of Republika Srpska in the 2025–26 election, and was confirmed again as prime minister by the National Assembly the following day.) – 9 November 2026	1 year, 68 days	Alliance of Independent Social Democrats	Minić I	2022	Milorad Dodik (2022–2025)
13		Savo Minić; Саво Минић (born 1974)	2 September 2025 – 9 November 2026	1 year, 68 days	Alliance of Independent Social Democrats	Minić II	2022	Siniša Karan (2026)
13		Savo Minić; Саво Минић (born 1974)	2 September 2025 – 9 November 2026	1 year, 68 days	Alliance of Independent Social Democrats	Minić III	2022	Siniša Karan (2026)
—		Anđelka Kuzmić; Анђелка Кузмић (born 1985)	9 November 2026 – Incumbent	7 days	Alliance of Independent Social Democrats	Acting	2026	Savo Minić (2026–present)

== Standard ==
Standard of the prime minister of Republika Srpska 1995–2007.

== See also ==
- President of Republika Srpska
  - List of presidents of Republika Srpska
- List of vice presidents of Republika Srpska
- List of speakers of the National Assembly of Republika Srpska
