= Serb National Alliance =

Defunct political party in Bosnia and Herzegovina

Serb National Alliance Српски народни савез Srpski narodni savez
- Founder: Biljana Plavšić
- Founded: August 1997
- Dissolved: past 2006
- Merged into: Democratic People's Alliance
- Headquarters: Banja Luka
- Ideology: Serbian nationalism; Conservatism; Pro-Europeanism
- Political position: Centre-right

The Serb National Alliance or Serbian People's Alliance of Republika Srpska (Serbian: Српски народни савез РС, Srpski narodni savez RS) was a Serb political party in Bosnia and Herzegovina, active in the Republika Srpska entity (one of two entities comprising the state of Bosnia and Herzegovina, where the majority of Bosnian Serbs live).

== History ==
=== Establishment and early years ===
Due to a growing isolation of Republika Srpska after the peace was signed (14 December 1995), Biljana Plavšić severed her ties with the Serb Democratic Party and formed the Serb National Alliance, and nominated Milorad Dodik, then a member of the National Assembly of the Republika Srpska whose Alliance of Independent Social Democrats-party had only two MPs, for Prime Minister.

This marked the beginning of political reform in Republika Srpska and the cooperation with the International Community. She lost the 1998 election to the joint candidate of the Serb Democratic Party and the Serbian Radical Party of the Republika Srpska, Nikola Poplašen. She was a candidate of the reform Sloga ("Solidarity" or "Unity") coalition. Her political career was in decline until the release of the indictment by the ICTY, after which it was completely terminated.

== National Assembly of Republika Srpska membership ==
The National Assembly is the legislative body of Republika Srpska. The current assembly is the seventh since the founding of the entity.

Parliament of Republika Srpska
Year	Popular vote	% of popular vote	# of seats	Seat change	Government
1997	126,852	18.07%	15 / 83	—N/a	Coalition
1998	95,817	12.9%	12 / 83	▼3	Coalition
2000	14,239	2.3%	2 / 83	▼10	Opposition
2002	4,992	1.0%	1 / 83	▼1	Opposition

== Positions held ==
President of Republika Srpska	Years
Biljana Plavšić	1997–1998

== See also ==
- Biljana Plavšić
