= Bogdana Koljević Griffith =

Serbian politician

- Богдана Кољевић Грифит
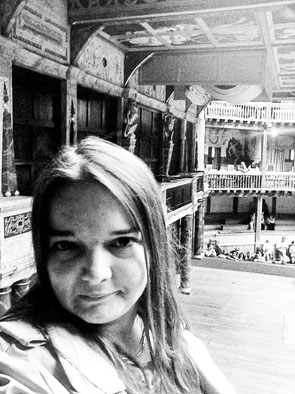

Member of the National Assembly of the Republic of Serbia
- Incumbent
- Assumed office 6 February 2024

Member of the Senate of the Republika Srpska
- Incumbent
- Assumed office 8 January 2017

Personal details
- Born: Bogdana Koljević; 15 February 1979 (age 47) Sarajevo, SR Bosnia and Herzegovina, SFR Yugoslavia
- Party: DSS (2008–?); SNP (2014–?); MI–GIN (2023–24); MI–SN (2024); Ind. (2024–?); MI–GIN (?–present)
- Parent: Nikola Koljević (father)
- Relatives: Srđan Koljević (brother)

Bogdana Koljević Griffith (Serbian: Богдана Кољевић Грифит / Bogdana Koljević Grifit; born 15 February 1979), is a Serbian political philosopher, editor, and politician. She has been a member of the Serbian parliament since February 2024, originally as a member of the We – Voice from the People (MI–GIN) political movement, later with the breakaway We – Power of the People (MI–SN) movement and as an independent delegate, and subsequently with MI–GIN again. She has also been a member of the Senate of Republika Srpska, an advisory body, since January 2017.

Koljević Griffith is the daughter of Nikola Koljević, who was a vice-president of the Republika Srpska from 1992 to 1996 (i.e., for most of the period of the Bosnian War and into the transitional period after the signing of the Dayton Agreement). She is a supporter of her father's political legacy, citing him as one of the first politicians in the Republika Srpska to recognize that Dayton would be beneficial for the entity, providing it with international legitimacy and the means of developing its identity and autonomy.

== Early life and academic career ==
Koljević Griffith was born in Sarajevo, then the capital of the Socialist Republic of Bosnia and Herzegovina in the Socialist Federal Republic of Yugoslavia. She holds a bachelor's degree (2002) from the University of Belgrade Faculty of Philosophy and a master's degree (2005) and Ph.D (2010) from The New School for Social Research in New York City. She is a senior research associate at the Institute for Political Studies in Belgrade and was the editor of the right-wing political journal Nova srpska politička misao from 2007 to 2016. She now lives in the Belgrade municipality of Čukarica.

She is a critic of the European Union (EU) and the North Atlantic Treaty Organization (NATO), which she regards as exponents of neoliberal hegemony. She has described the European Union as producing a new Brussels-based elite class that has sought to create a European "oneness" predicated around "a technocratic understanding of efficiency" while ignoring Europe's "divergent cultural and political identities" and for the most part setting aside "key issues of and for a political community per se — such as democracy, legitimacy, community, and subjectivity." She further contends that the failure of this elite to accomplish its goals has inadvertently opened a space where real democracy, as she defines the term, might be able to flourish under the proper conditions. She writes, "because other viable alternatives were missing, the response to the empty place of the polis in and of the EU is the return of demos in its raw outlook." On another occasion, she described this potential revival of public political space in Europe as representing "precisely the revival of Europe’s best traditions: antiquity, Christianity, and modernity."

She has written that "the Western wars against the Serbs" (as she describes the interventions of western powers in the Yugoslav Wars of the 1990s) were the beginning of a period of "biopolitical militarism" that also encompassed the western interventions in Iraq, Libya, and Syria, as well as the Arab Spring and the Orange Revolution in Ukraine. She has described this process as representing the destruction of traditional European values, culminating with what she considers as western support for neo-Nazism in the context of the Russo-Ukrainian War. She has described the re-emergence of Russia as a world power as a disruption to neoliberal hegemony, allowing for the "equality of states and peoples" and for the development of "true democracy" in the sense of "self-determination of the people."

Her monograph Twenty-First Century Biopolitics was published in English in 2015, providing an extended critique of what she identifies as neoliberalism. Promena epoha i Zapad na raskršću (English: The Change of Epochs and the West at the Crossroads), which continues the same line of argument, was promoted at the Republika Srpska assembly in January 2023. Siniša Ljepojević and Aleksandar Pavić, her future colleagues in the MI–GIN movement, were present on the latter occasion.

== Politician ==
Koljević Griffith joined the Democratic Party of Serbia (DSS) after the 2008 Serbian parliamentary election. In September 2014, she became a founding member of the breakaway Serbian People's Party (SNP).

=== Senator in the Republika Srpska ===
Republika Srpska president Milorad Dodik appointed Koljević Griffith to a seven-year Senate term in 2017. She took her seat at the constitutive session on 8 January.

Koljević Griffith rejects the view that the Srebrenica massacre constitutes an act of genocide. She praised the Republika Srpska parliament in April 2024 for adopting the report of the "Independent International Commission for the Investigation of the Suffering of All Peoples in the Srebrenica Region in the period from 1992 to 1995," remarking that "the Republika Srpska is building a policy of truth" and that "the myth of the 'Srebrenica Genocide' should finally be dispelled."

Dodik appointed Koljević Griffith to a second Senate term in November 2024. When the outgoing administration of United States president Joseph Biden imposed sanctions against individuals and corporations in the Republika Srpska the following month, Koljević Griffith referred to the administration as representing an "infinite banality of evil" and said, "There remains a well-founded hope that with Trump, America will return to itself, that is, to its former best traditions."

=== Serbian parliamentarian ===
Koljević Griffith appeared in the fifth position on the We – Voice from the People electoral list in the 2023 Serbian parliamentary election and was elected when the list unexpectedly won thirteen mandates. She took her seat when the new assembly convened in February 2024. Shortly thereafter, the We movement split into two factions, with list holder Branimir Nestorović leaving to form a new group called We – Power of the People (MI–SN). Koljević Griffith joined Nestorović's group. The Serbian Progressive Party (SNS) and its allies won a majority victory, and both We groups served in opposition; notwithstanding this, Koljević Griffith was chosen as chair of the assembly committee on education, science, technological development, and the information society.

Koljević Griffith left the MI–SN movement in July 2024, saying, "members of this parliamentary group have not shown respect for basic civilizational norms and principles." Aleksandar Pavić contested this explanation, saying that she had actually left after the MI–SN movement sought to remove her as head of the education committee. "She didn't come to meetings or sessions, and on top of that she was the head of the Education Committee," Pavić said. "That's why we initiated the process to replace her with someone who would be active." She was, in any event, required to stand down as committee chair after losing her MI–SN endorsement.

She later rejoined the MI–GIN assembly group. In the assembly, Koljević Griffith is now a deputy member of the defence and internal affairs committee, the foreign affairs committee, and the culture and information committee, as well as being a member of Serbia's parliamentary friendship groups with Canada, Georgia, and Tunisia.

The Serbian national assembly's page for Koljević Griffith lists her as a member of the Republic of Serbia-Republika Srpska parliamentary forum. This is likely an error; she was chosen as one of Serbia's delegates to this body in 2024, but she stood down on 31 July 2024 after losing her endorsement from MI–SN, and she does not appear on the current list of delegates.
