= Dušan Kozić =

Bosnian Serb politician (born 1958)

- Душан Козић
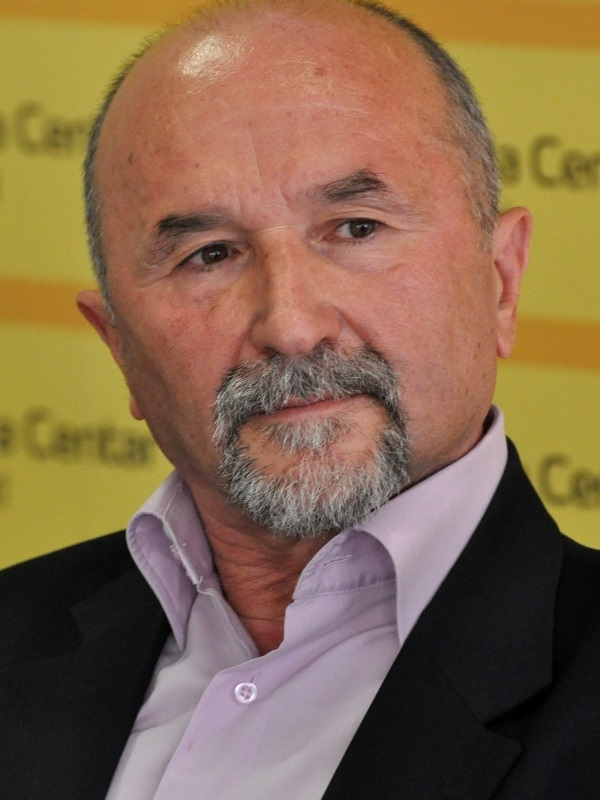
- Kozić in 2015

Prime Minister of Republika Srpska
- In office 18 August 1994 – 16 October 1995
- President: Radovan Karadžić
- Preceded by: Vladimir Lukić
- Succeeded by: Rajko Kasagić

Personal details
- Born: 8 December 1958 (age 67) Ljubinje, SFR Yugoslavia
- Party: SDS
- Occupation: Politician

Dušan Kozić (Serbian: Душан Козић; born 8 December 1958) is a Bosnian Serb politician. A member of the Serb Democratic Party, he served as prime minister of Republika Srpska from 1994 to 1995.

Political offices
Preceded by Vladimir Lukić	Prime Minister of Republika Srpska; 1994–1995	Succeeded by Rajko Kasagić
