= Tanasije Vučić =

Serbian guslar (1888–1931)

Tanasije Vućić (1888–1931) was a Serbian guslar who followed and entertained the Serbian and Montenegrin Army in the Balkan and First World wars.

He is remembered as a popular, modern guslar in the early part of the 20th century with Serbs everywhere including musicologists who came from far and wide to record his epic singing. Most musicologists were acquainted either from what they read or from recording the diction of Tanasije Vućić, the guslar whom linguist Gerhard Gesemann (1888–1948) bought from Montenegro to Prague. Once there, Matija Murko invited Vućić to sing the poem Majka Jugovića for the Seminar for Slavic Philology in Prague. Later, Gesemann invited Vućić to Berlin – from Montenegro.

Vućić was born in Petnjica in 1888. He came from the historical Serbian tribe and region of Drobnjak.
