= Rajko Kasagić =

Bosnian Serb politician (1942–2026)

- Рајко Касагић
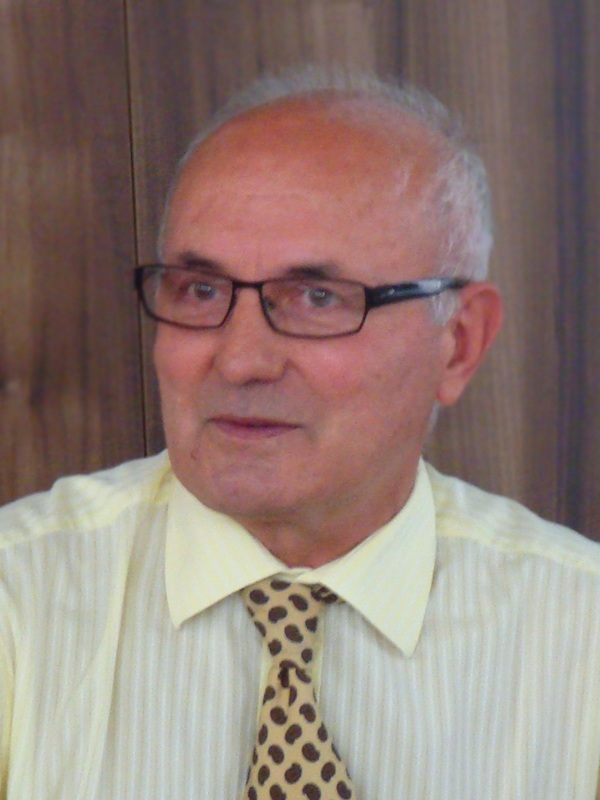
- Kasagić in 2013

Prime Minister of Republika Srpska
- In office 16 October 1995 – 18 May 1996
- President: Radovan Karadžić
- Preceded by: Dušan Kozić
- Succeeded by: Gojko Kličković

Personal details
- Born: 15 October 1942 Razboj Ljevčanski, Independent State of Croatia
- Died: 6 May 2026 (aged 83) Banja Luka, Republika Srpska, Bosnia and Herzegovina
- Party: SDS
- Occupation: Politician

Rajko Kasagić (Serbian: Рајко Касагић; 15 October 1942 – 6 May 2026) was a Bosnian Serb politician. A member of the Serb Democratic Party, he served as prime minister of Republika Srpska from 1995 to 1996.

== Life and career ==
Kasagić was born in Razboj, Srbac on 15 October 1942. He studied law and did postgraduate studies in Banja Luka and Niš. He was also involved in academic work at Banja Luka, Brčko, the University of East Sarajevo, and the International University in Travnik.

After collapse of Yugoslavia and the Yugoslav Wars, he worked in the Bosnian Serb entity of Republika Srpska, serving as President of the Executive Board of Banja Luka and a member of the High Representative’s Commission for the Implementation of the Dayton Peace Agreement. He was also became a judge of the Court of Associated Labor of Bosnia and Herzegovina. He was elected as a deputy in the Assembly of the Socialist Republic of Bosnia and Herzegovina, and then in the National Assembly of Republika Srpska. He also served as the Secretary of the Secretariat for Inspection Affairs of the Municipality of Banja Luka. He also served as a defense witness for Momčilo Krajišnik in the latter's war crimes trial in The Hague.

Kasagić died on 6 May 2026, at the age of 83.

Political offices
Preceded by Dušan Kozić	Prime Minister of Republika Srpska; 1995–1996	Succeeded by Gojko Kličković
