= Ćamil Duraković =

Bosnian politician and Vice President of Republika Srpska

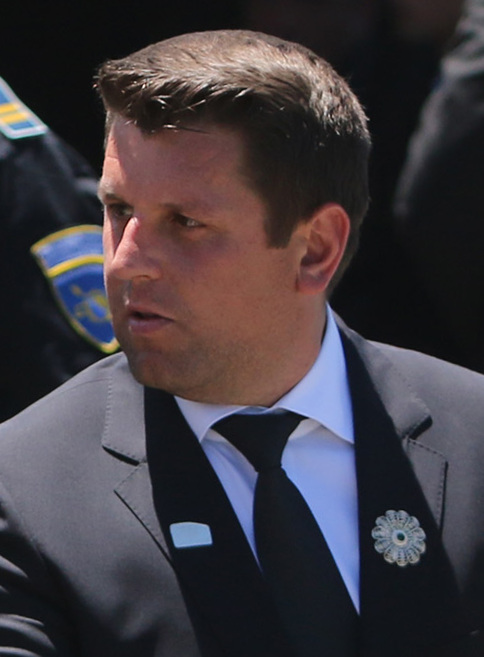
- Duraković in 2015

Vice President of Republika Srpska
- In office 15 November 2022 – 16 November 2026 Serving with Davor Pranjić
- President: Milorad Dodik; Ana Trišić-Babić (acting); Siniša Karan
- Preceded by: Ramiz Salkić
- Succeeded by: Ramiz Salkić

Mayor of Srebrenica
- In office 2012–2016
- Preceded by: Osman Suljić
- Succeeded by: Mladen Grujičić

Speaker of the Srebrenica Municipal Assembly
- In office April 2021 – September 2021

Personal details
- Born: January 18, 1979 (age 47) Luka, Srebrenica, SR Bosnia and Herzegovina, Yugoslavia
- Citizenship: Bosnia and Herzegovina
- Party: Independent
- Education: Southern New Hampshire University (MA); University of Tuzla (MA)
- Occupation: Politician
- Website: predsjednikrs.rs

Ćamil Duraković (born 18 January 1979) is a Bosnian politician who previously served as the Bosniak Vice President of Republika Srpska (2022–2026), alongside Davor Pranjić and the Mayor of Srebrenica (2012–2016).

== Early life and education ==
Born near Srebrenica, Duraković survived the 1995 Srebrenica genocide via the "Column of Death". He later immigrated to the US as a refugee, earning a Master's degree in New Hampshire, before obtaining a second Master’s degree from the University of Tuzla in 2018.

== Career ==
Returning to Bosnia in 2005, Duraković held various local roles in Srebrenica, serving as Deputy Mayor before becoming Mayor in 2012. As an independent, he focused on reconstruction and returnee rights. Following his mayoral term, he served in the Srebrenica Municipal Assembly (2021) and was elected as an independent Vice President of Republika Srpska in 2022.

== Personal life ==
Duraković authored Srebrenica – A Forgotten Promise.
