= Smilja Avramov =

Serbian academic and legal scholar (1918–2018)

- Смиља Аврамов
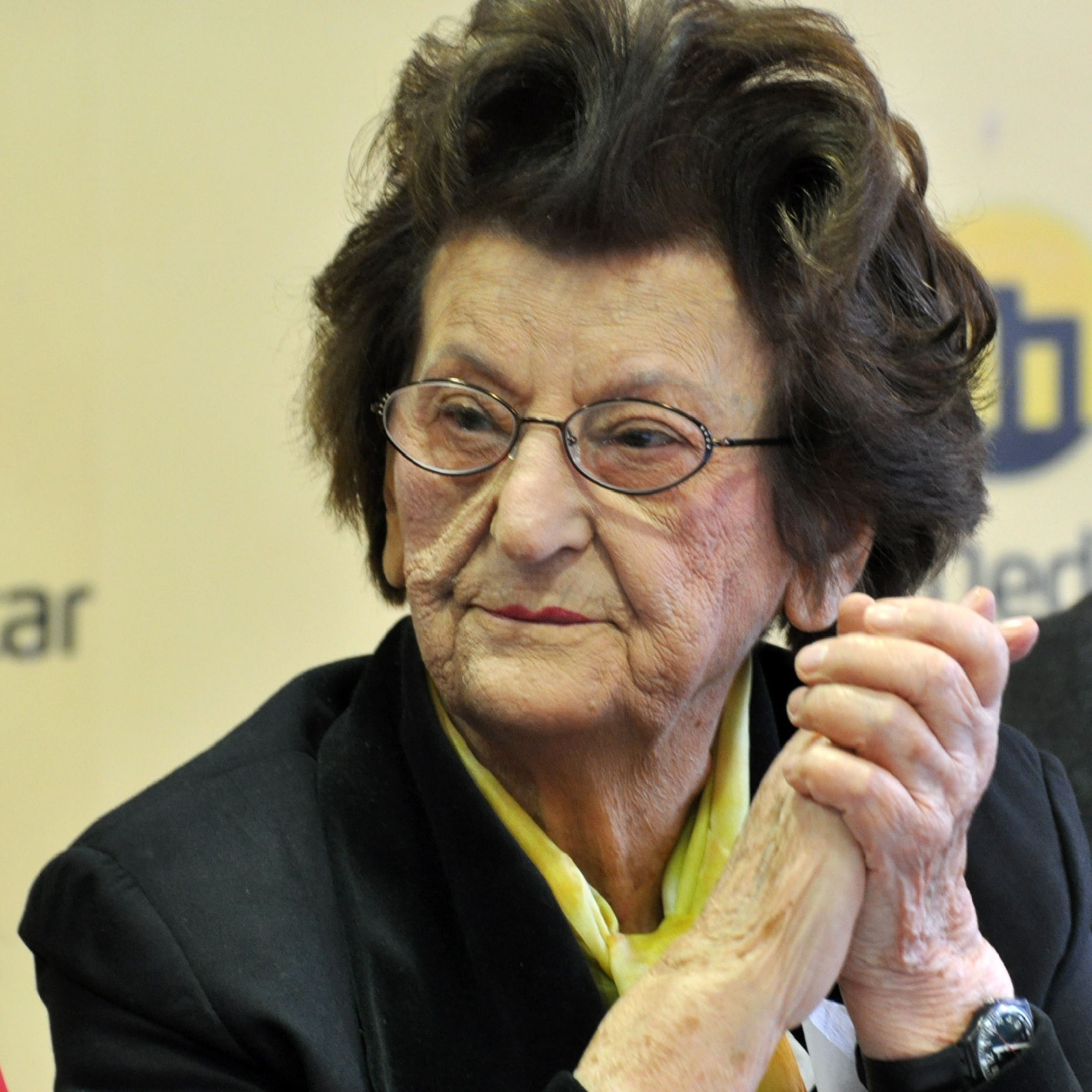
- Avramov in 2011
- Born: 15 February 1918; Pakrac, Kingdom of Croatia-Slavonia, Austria-Hungary
- Died: 2 October 2018 (aged 100); Belgrade, Serbia
- Occupations: Academician, legal scholar, Professor of International law

Smilja Avramov (Serbian Cyrillic: Смиља Аврамов; 15 February 1918 – 2 October 2018) was a Serbian academic, legal scholar, social activist and educator in international law. She was a member of the Senate of Republika Srpska from 1996 to 2009. Before she retired she was a Professor of International law at the Law Faculty at Belgrade University.

== Education and career ==
Avramov finished high school in Sušak, Rijeka, Kingdom of Yugoslavia, in 1936. She was maternally related to Petar Preradović and Pavle Solarić. During World War II in Yugoslavia, eleven members of her family were murdered at Jasenovac concentration camp.

She graduated in the Zagreb Law Faculty in 1947. She received her master's degree in London and a PhD in Belgrade in 1950. She also studied at the Vienna, Harvard and Columbia Universities. Since 1949 until her retirement, Avramov worked as an assistant and a professor at the Belgrade Faculty of Law where she was also head of the Department for International Law and Relationships and director of the Institute for International Law. These positions included membership of the Judicial Council of the Ministry of Foreign Affairs of Yugoslavia. Avramov was active in many law associations including the one in Belgrade. She was president of the Yugoslav International Law Association and, since 1980, a president of the International Law Association.

As distinguished scholar Avramov was a member of the first convocation of the Senate of Republika Srpska, serving from 1996 to 2009. Avramov was also a member of Committee on Formation of Customary (General) International Law whose report was submitted at London conference held in 2000. Avramov was president of the International Confederation for Disarmament and Peace. Since 1999 Avramov has been a member of the presidency of the movement "Women authors – Conscience of Serbia".

== Public engagement ==
She publicly opposed the practice of humanitarian interventionism, emphasizing that the main danger for the modern world is neither nationalism or communism, but legal nihilism.

In her work The Trilateral, she alleged a conspiracy of the Bilderberg Group, the Council on Foreign Relations and the Trilateral Commission in the context of Balkan politics and global relations. In 2006, Avramov was one of the professors who signed the request for rehabilitation of Draža Mihailović. She served as an advisor to Slobodan Milošević between 1991 and 1992 and was a witness for the defence at his trial in 2004. She helped to found the Committee for the Protection of Serbs from the Hague Tribunal and was a member of the International Committee for the Truth of Radovan Karadžić, also assisting with his unsuccessful defence on charges of war crimes.

Avramov expressed her disagreement in 2013 when the Government of Serbia signed the Brussels Agreement with the Government of Kosovo, saying that it violates the Constitution of Serbia and the Charter of the United Nations and indirectly recognizes Kosovo as an independent state.

== Death ==
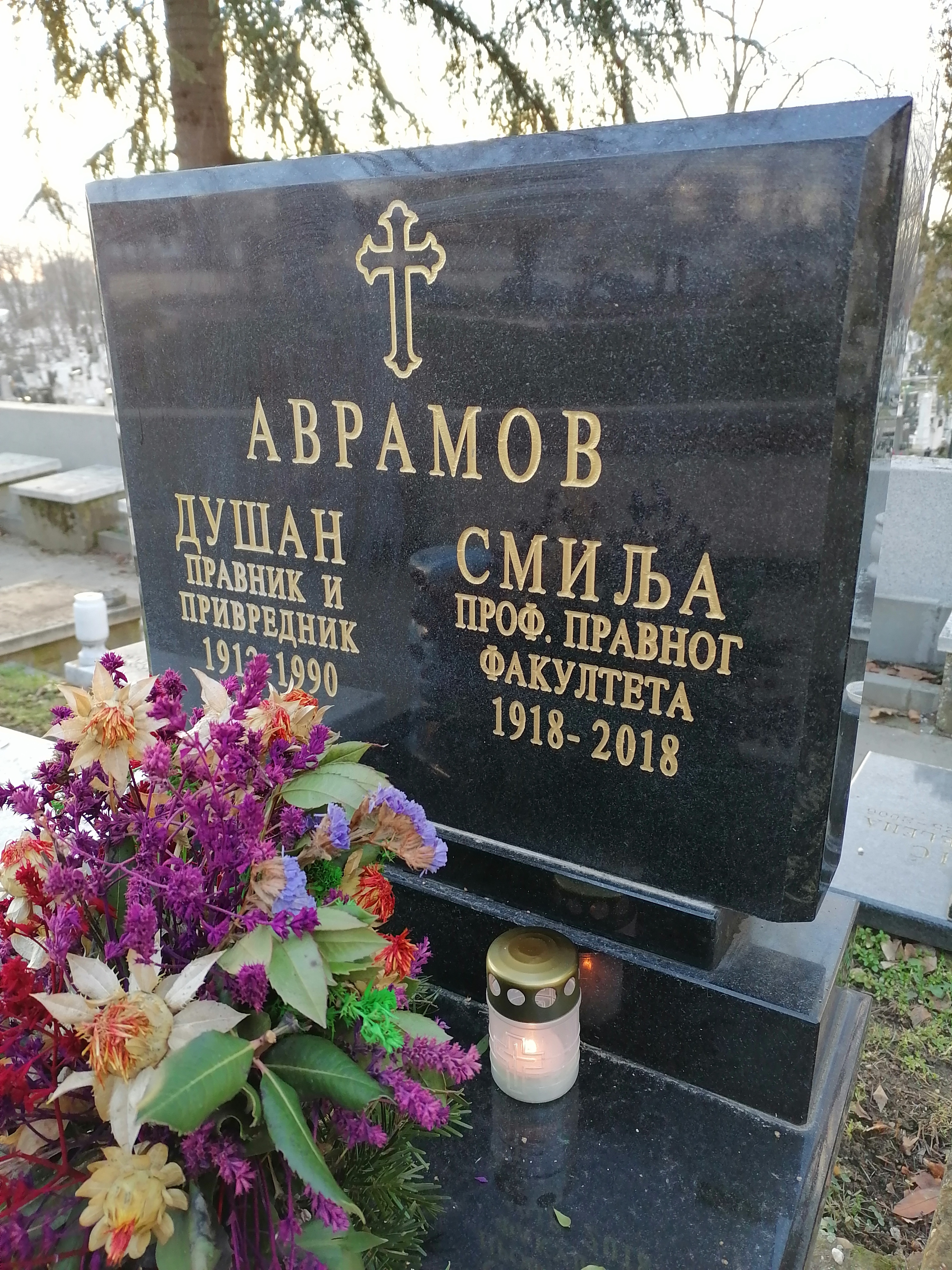
Avramov - Dušan, lawyer and businessman, 1912–1990 - Smilja, professor at law faculty, 1918-2018

Avramov died in Belgrade on 2 October 2018 at the age of 100.

== Selected works ==
- Međunarodno Javno Pravo, 1976
- International criminal law and the UN Charter, 1993
- Genocide in Yugoslavia, 1995
