= People's Alliance for Free Peace =

Bosnian Serb political alliance

People's Alliance for Free Peace Народни савез за слободан мир Narodni savez za slobodan mir
- Leader: Živko Radišić
- Founders: Živko Radišić; Milorad Dodik
- Founded: 1996
- Dissolved: 1997
- Headquarters: Banja Luka
- Political position: Centre-left

The People's Alliance for Free Peace (Serbian: Народни савез за слободан мир, romanized: Narodni savez za slobodan mir, NSSM) was a centre-left political alliance in Bosnia and Herzegovina, formed for the 1996 general election.

The alliance consisted of the Socialist Party, the Alliance of Independent Social Democrats, the Yugoslav Left and the New Workers' Party.

== History ==
Consisting of the Socialist Party, the Alliance of Independent Social Democrats, the Yugoslav Left and the New Workers' Party, the alliance contested the 1996 general election, but only in Republika Srpska. It finished third in Republika Srpska with 11.53% of the vote, winning ten of the 83 seats in the National Assembly of Republika Srpska. It won two seats in the national House of Representatives.

The alliance did not contest any further elections.

== Election results ==
=== Parliamentary Assembly of Bosnia and Herzegovina ===
| Election | # | Votes | % | HoR | +/– | HoP | +/– | Status |
|---|---|---|---|---|---|---|---|---|
| 1996 | 5th | 136,077 | 5.67 | 2 / 42 | New | 0 / 15 | New | Opposition |

=== National Assembly of Republika Srpska ===
| Election | # | Votes | % | Seats | +/– | Status |
|---|---|---|---|---|---|---|
| 1996 | 3rd | 125,372 | 11.53% | 10 / 83 | New | Opposition |
