= Ramiz Salkić =

Bosniak politician and former Vice President of Republika Srpska

Vice President of Republika Srpska
- Incumbent
- Assumed office 16 November 2026 Serving with Igor Balukčić
- President: Savo Minić
- Preceded by: Ćamil Duraković
- In office 24 November 2014 – 15 November 2022
- President: Milorad Dodik; Željka Cvijanović
- Preceded by: Enes Suljkanović
- Succeeded by: Ćamil Duraković

Member of the National Assembly of Republika Srpska
- Incumbent
- Assumed office 15 November 2022

Vice President of the National Assembly of Republika Srpska
- In office 2010–2014

Member of the National Assembly of Republika Srpska
- In office 2006–2014

Personal details
- Born: November 15, 1973 (age 53) Hranča near Bratunac, SR Bosnia and Herzegovina, Yugoslavia
- Party: Party of Democratic Action
- Children: 3
- Education: University of Tuzla (BSc, MSc)
- Website: ramizsalkic.ba

Ramiz Salkić (born 15 November 1973) is a Bosnian politician currently serving as a member of the National Assembly of Republika Srpska since 2022. He previously served as the Vice President of Republika Srpska representing the Bosniaks from 2014 to 2022, and as Vice President of the National Assembly from 2010 to 2014.

== Early life and education ==
Salkić was born on 15 November 1973 in the village of Hranča, located near Bratunac in the former SFR Yugoslavia. He completed his primary and secondary education in Bratunac. Following the outbreak of the Bosnian War in May 1992, Salkić was captured by Serb forces and detained in the Branko Radičević elementary school detention camp in Bratunac, where he suffered severe abuse, before being transferred to another camp on Pale. His father and two brothers were killed during the war. Salkić subsequently joined the Army of the Republic of Bosnia and Herzegovina during the conflict.

Following the war, Salkić pursued his higher education at the University of Tuzla, graduating with a degree in biology and chemistry from the Faculty of Philosophy. He later completed his postgraduate studies at the Faculty of Science and Mathematics at the same university, earning a Master of Science in biology. Before entering full-time politics, he worked as a professor at the Podrinje Elementary School, the Secondary School of Economics, and the Behram-beg Medresa in Tuzla.

== Political career ==
Salkić joined the Party of Democratic Action (SDA) and rose through its ranks, serving as the president of the SDA Youth Association Group and later joining the party's central Presidency.

In 2003, he was elected as a delegate to the Council of Peoples of Republika Srpska, where he served as the chairman of the Bosniak Caucus until 2006. He was elected to the National Assembly of Republika Srpska in the 2006 general election, heading the SDA-SDP parliamentary group. Following his re-election in 2010, Salkić was chosen as the Vice President of the National Assembly.

In the 2014 general election, Salkić ran for the entity vice presidency and was elected as the Vice President of Republika Srpska representing the Bosniak community. He was re-elected to a second consecutive term in 2018 under President Željka Cvijanović. Throughout his executive tenure, Salkić frequently clashed with Serb authorities over the status and civic rights of Bosniak and Croat returnees, the institutional recognition of the Bosnian language, and political moves toward regional separatism.

Barred by the constitution from seeking a third consecutive term as vice president, Salkić contested the 2022 general elections and returned to the National Assembly of Republika Srpska as a member of parliament. In parliament, he remains a vocal advocate for democratic reforms, anti-discrimination legislation, and minority protections.

== Personal life ==
Salkić is married and lives with his family in Bratunac. He has published several scientific and political research papers related to his field of biology and post-war returnee integration challenges.
