= Legal nihilism =

Negative attitude toward law

Legal nihilism is negative attitude toward law. Legal nihilism is "an erosion of the belief in law as a beneficial institution of societal organization." Many scholars believe that legal nihilism is a destructive phenomenon.

Depending on the law it denies, legal nihilism can be internal and international.

== Internal legal nihilism ==
=== Russian Empire, Soviet Union and its successors ===
Andrzej Walicki thought that both bureaucracy of the Russian Empire and socialists that replaced them had the similar negative attitude toward law because of the Slavic character of Russia. It is believed by many scholars and public figures that legal nihilism is still widely spread in some countries of former Soviet Union including Belarus, Ukraine and Russia. Russian president Dmitry Medvedev often spoke against legal nihilism identifying increasing of the strength of law and legal awareness of the people. A pressure of the international public opinion has substantial influence on the struggle against internal legal nihilism in Russia.

== International legal nihilism ==
International legal nihilism is denial of international law. It can be a consequence of dualist theory that international and national law are independent autonomous systems. Serbian expert in international law Smilja Avramov publicly opposed the practice of Humanitarian interventionism, emphasizing that the main danger for the modern world is not nationalism nor communism but legal nihilism which she thinks was employed during the breakup of Yugoslavia.

=== NATO and USA ===
Jan Nederveen Pieterse believes that the United States is in the position of new universal Empire which succeeds Roman and British, but unlike them, the United States maintains "Pax" not on the basis of the rule of law, but on the rule of power. He also emphasized that breaches of the international law placed United States in the position of "international legal nihilism" and that USA does not recognize other polities as legitimate equals.
