= Srebrenka Golić =

Bosnian politician and lawyer

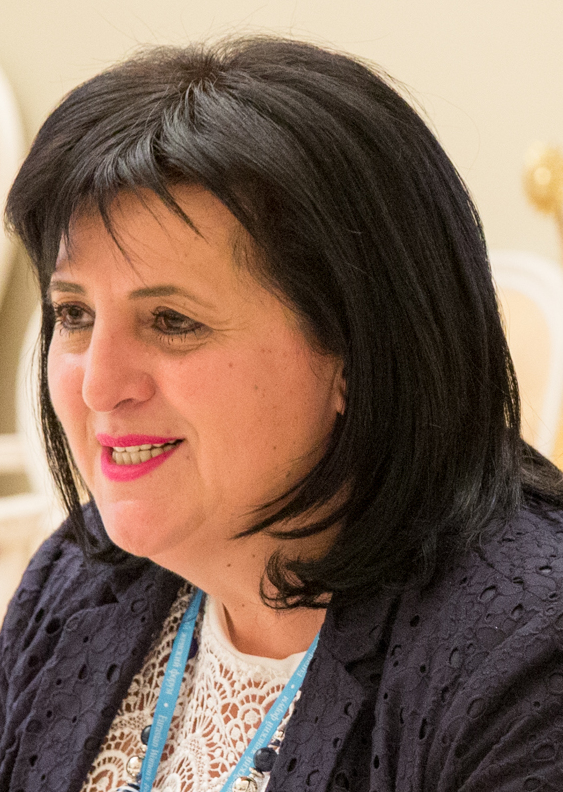
- Golić in 2015

Prime Minister of Republika Srpska Acting
- In office 19 November 2018 – 18 December 2018
- President: Milorad Dodik
- Preceded by: Željka Cvijanović
- Succeeded by: Radovan Višković

Personal details
- Born: 29 July 1958 (age 68) Banja Luka, PR Bosnia and Herzegovina, FPR Yugoslavia
- Party: Alliance of Independent Social Democrats
- Children: 1
- Education: University of Banja Luka

Srebrenka Golić (born 29 July 1958) is a Bosnian politician and lawyer in Republika Srpska. She has served as Minister of Physical Planning, Civil Engineering and Ecology since 2010, deputy prime minister since 2015 and was acting Prime Minister from 19 November to 18 December 2018.

== Early life and career ==
Golić graduated from high school and law studies in Banja Luka. She worked as a lawyer in enterprises and local administration, as well as head of the office of the prime minister's adviser and director of the official journal of Republika Srpska.

== Political career ==
Golić became involved in activities within the Alliance of Independent Social Democrats, taking the position of secretary to the party's main board. In 2010, she was nominated to the position of Minister of Physical Planning, Civil Engineering and Ecology in Aleksandar Džombić's cabinet, and retained her in two more offices in Željka Cvijanović's cabinet. On 3 February 2015, she was also appointed deputy prime minister. After Cvijanović took the presidency, Golić temporarily served as Prime Minister from 19 November to 18 December 2018.

== Personal life ==
Golić is married and has one child. She is of Bosniak ethnicity.
