= Elena Guskova =

Russian historian (born 1949)

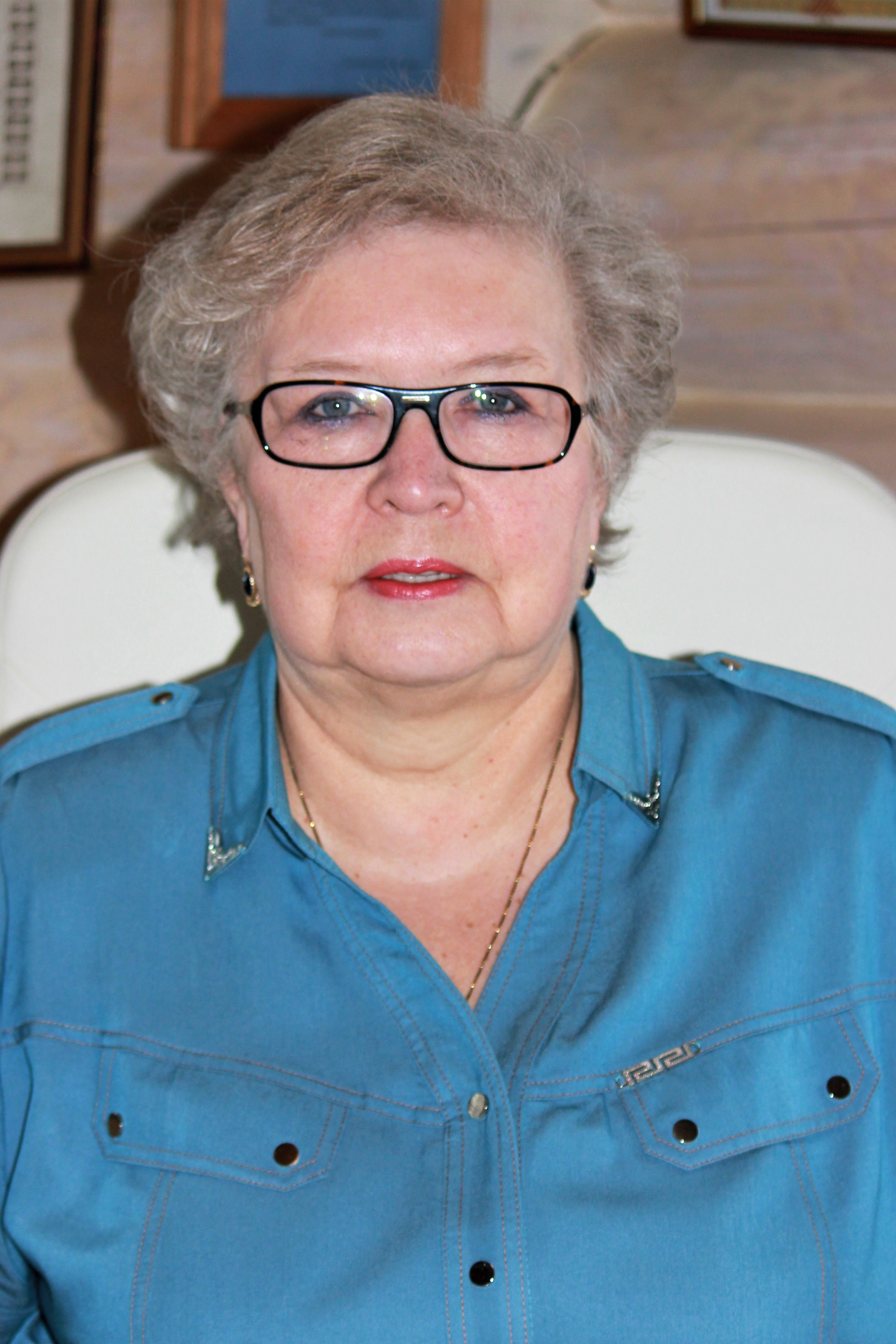
- Guskova in 2018
- Born: Елена Юрьевна Гуськова; 23 September 1949 (age 77); Moscow, Soviet Union
- Occupation: historian

Elena Yuryevna Guskova (Russian: Елена Юрьевна Гускова; born 23 September 1949) is a Russian historian and member of the Serbian Academy of Science and Arts.

Elena Guskova is one of the scholars who blame the Western countries not only for breakup of Yugoslavia but also for the violence which accompanied it. She is also a member of the Senate of Republika Srpska. Guskova publicly stated her opinion that the Brussels Agreement (2013) signed by the Government of Serbia in April 2013 indirectly recognizes Kosovo as independent state.

== Biography ==
Jelena Jurjevna Guskova née Derjabina was born on 23 September 1949 in Moscow. In 1972, she graduated from the Faculty of History of Moscow State University at the Department of History of Southern and Western Slavs. At the same faculty, she received her master's degree in the thesis on the socio-economic development of Serbia in the middle of the 19th century. There, in 1990, she defended her doctoral dissertation on socio-political organizations and the self-governing system of the SFRY.

In 1994, she worked as a scientific expert on the Balkans at the UN peacekeeping headquarters in the former Yugoslavia in Zagreb. From 1972 to 2002, she worked at the Institute of Information for Social Sciences of the Russian Academy of Sciences as a leading research associate, and at the same time, she worked at the Institute for Slavic Studies of the Russian Academy of Sciences as the head of the Center for Contemporary Balkan Crisis. She has been working at that Institute continuously since 2002 as a manager.

Jelena Guskova has lectured at Lomonosov Moscow State University (1993, 1995, 1998, 2001 and 2003), Irkutsk State University (1993), Perm State University (1995), the Diplomatic Academy of the Ministry of Foreign Affairs of the Russian Federation (2002), the Ural State University. University (2005) and the State University of Humanities of the Russian Academy of Sciences (currently). All her past and present lectures were dedicated to the history of Yugoslavia. Historiographically, she studied the opportunities and troubles in the Balkans during the second half of the 20th century, general disagreements in multinational states, interstate relations, Russia's foreign policy towards the Balkans, etc.
