= 1998 Republika Srpska general election =

- 12–13 September 1998
- Presidential election

| Candidate | Nikola Poplašen | Biljana Plavšić |
| Party | SRS RS | SNS |
| Popular vote | 322,684 | 286,606 |
| Percentage | 43.86% | 38.96% |
President before election
Biljana Plavšić
SNS
Elected President
Nikola Poplašen
SRS RS
- Parliamentary election
| Party | Leader | Vote % | Seats | +/– |
|---|---|---|---|---|
| SDS | Dragan Kalinić | 21.65 | 19 | −5 |
| SDA | Alija Izetbegović | 16.93 | 15 | −1 |
| SRS RS | Nikola Poplašen | 13.11 | 11 | −4 |
| SNS | Biljana Plavšić | 12.92 | 12 | −3 |
| SP | Živko Radišić | 10.67 | 10 | +1 |
| SNSD | Milorad Dodik | 7.29 | 6 | +4 |
| RS RS | Dragan Đurđević | 3.66 | 3 | New |
| SDP BiH | Zlatko Lagumdžija | 2.68 | 2 | 0 |
| SKRS | | 2.59 | 2 | New |
| HDZ BiH | Ante Jelavić | 1.55 | 1 | New |
| NHI–HKDU | Krešimir Zubak | 1.42 | 1 | New |
| SKO | | 0.41 | 1 | New |
This lists parties that won seats. See the complete results below.
| Prime Minister before | Prime Minister after |
|---|---|
| Milorad Dodik; SNSD | Milorad Dodik; SNSD |

General elections were held in Republika Srpska on 12 and 13 September 1998. They were third parliamentary election and second presidential election in three years.

Incumbent president Biljana Plavšić, who served since July 1996 after Radovan Karadžić resigned, lost to Nikola Poplašen, leader of the Serbian Radical Party of Republika Srpska. Mirko Šarović was elected Vice President.

In the parliamentary election, the Serb Democratic Party again won the most seats, but failed to form a government. Although newly elected president Poplašen tried to name SDS leader Dragan Kalinić as the new prime minister, he faced opposition from High Representative for Bosnia and Herzegovina Carlos Westendorp and was deposed shortly after. Prime Minister Milorad Dodik was subsequently chosen for another term.

== Results ==
=== President ===
| Candidate | Party | Votes | % |
|---|---|---|---|
| Nikola Poplašen | Serbian Radical Party | 322,684 | 43.86 |
| Biljana Plavšić | Serb National Alliance | 286,606 | 38.96 |
| Zulfo Nišić | Bosnian Party | 107,036 | 14.55 |
| Mihajlo Crnadak | Serb Coalition for Republika Srpska | 16,079 | 2.19 |
| Predrag Sekulović | Party for Yugoslavia | 3,295 | 0.45 |
| Total | | 735,700 | 100.00 |
| Valid votes | | 735,700 | 86.97 |
| Invalid/blank votes | | 110,209 | 13.03 |
| Total votes | | 845,909 | 100.00 |
Source: RZS

=== Parliament ===
| Party | Votes | % | Seats | +/– |
|---|---|---|---|---|
| Serb Democratic Party | 160,594 | 21.65 | 19 | –5 |
| Party of Democratic Action | 125,546 | 16.93 | 15 | –1 |
| Serbian Radical Party | 97,244 | 13.11 | 11 | –4 |
| Serb National Alliance | 95,817 | 12.92 | 12 | –3 |
| Socialist Party | 79,179 | 10.67 | 10 | +1 |
| Alliance of Independent Social Democrats | 54,058 | 7.29 | 6 | +4 |
| Radical Party | 27,119 | 3.66 | 3 | New |
| Social Democratic Party | 19,892 | 2.68 | 2 | 0 |
| Serb Coalition for Republika Srpska | 19,198 | 2.59 | 2 | New |
| Croatian Democratic Union | 11,471 | 1.55 | 1 | New |
| NHI–HKDU | 10,546 | 1.42 | 1 | New |
| Coalition for King and Homeland | 3,044 | 0.41 | 1 | New |
| Other parties | 38,053 | 5.13 | 0 | – |
| Total | 741,761 | 100.00 | 83 | 0 |
| Valid votes | 741,761 | 87.85 | | |
| Invalid/blank votes | 102,559 | 12.15 | | |
| Total votes | 844,320 | 100.00 | | |
Source: RZS
