= Davor Pranjić =

Bosnian Croat politician (born 1994)

Vice President of Republika Srpska
- In office 15 November 2022 – 16 November 2026 Serving with Ćamil Duraković
- President: Milorad Dodik; Ana Trišić-Babić (acting); Siniša Karan
- Preceded by: Josip Jerković
- Succeeded by: Igor Balukčić

Personal details
- Born: 15 September 1994 (age 32) Sanski Most, Bosnia and Herzegovina
- Party: Croatian Democratic Union
- Education: University of Banja Luka (MB)
- Profession: Physician

Davor Pranjić (Serbian: Давор Прањић; born 15 September 1994) is a Bosnian Croat politician and physician. During his political career he served as the vice president of Republika Srpska (2022–2026), alongside Ćamil Duraković. Following the removal of Milorad Dodik from the office of president of Republika Srpska in 2025, Pranjić assumed presidential powers, though he stated that he never considered himself acting president.

== Early life and education ==
Pranjić was born on 15 September 1994 in Sanski Most, to a Croat father and Serb mother. There, he finished elementary school and high school, after which he studied medicine at the University of Banja Luka. He specialised in orthopaedic surgery.

== Political career ==
In 2019, Pranjić became the president of the Croatian Democratic Union committee in Banja Luka. In the 2022 general election, he was elected vice president of Republika Srpska, serving alongside Bosniak Ćamil Duraković.

As part of the fallout from the 2025 conviction of Republika Srpska president Milorad Dodik, Pranjić assumed presidential powers after the Central Election Commission of Bosnia and Herzegovina ordered Dodik's removal from the presidency. However, Pranjić never considered himself to be acting president. Ultimately, the National Assembly of Republika Srpska elected Ana Trišić-Babić on 18 October 2025 to serve as acting president of the entity until the election of a new president in the early presidential elections scheduled for 23 November 2025.
