= Nikola Koljević =

Bosnian Serb politician and scholar (1936–1997)

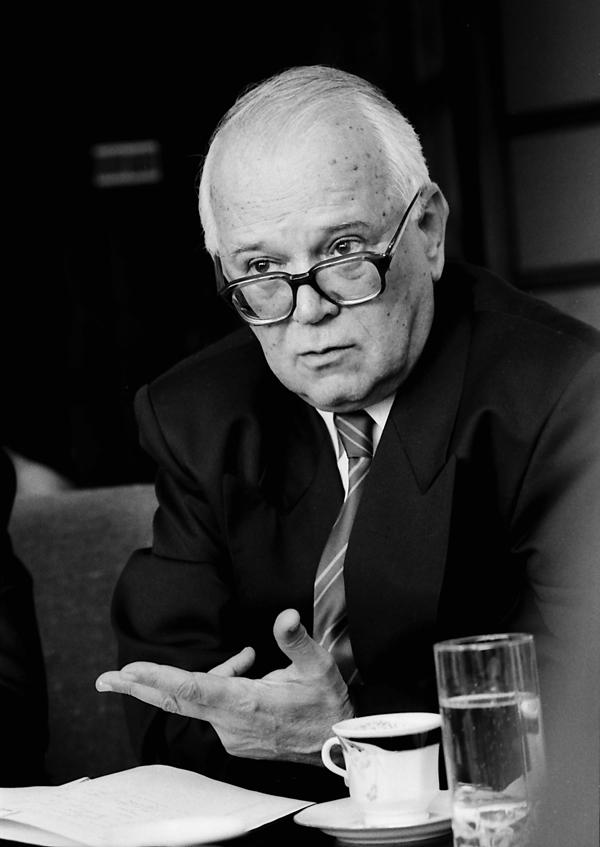
- Koljević in 1995

Vice President of Republika Srpska
- In office December 1992 – 14 September 1996 Serving with Biljana Plavšić (1992–1996)
- President: Radovan Karadžić; Biljana Plavšić
- Preceded by: Office established
- Succeeded by: Dragoljub Mirjanić

Serb member of the Presidency of Bosnia and Herzegovina
- In office 20 December 1990 – 9 April 1992 Serving with Biljana Plavšić
- Preceded by: Office established
- Succeeded by: Mirko Pejanović

Personal details
- Born: 9 June 1936 Banja Luka, Kingdom of Yugoslavia
- Died: 25 January 1997 (aged 60) Belgrade, Serbia, FR Yugoslavia
- Relatives: Bogdana Koljević Griffith (daughter); Srđan Koljević (son)
- Occupation: Professor, writer, and politician

Nikola Koljević (Serbian Cyrillic: Никола Кољевић; 9 June 1936 – 25 January 1997) was a Bosnian Serb politician, university professor, translator, and essayist who served as the Serb member of the Presidency of Bosnia and Herzegovina alongside Biljana Plavšić from 1990 to 1992. He was subsequently the vice president of Republika Srpska during the Bosnian War.

In 2016, Koljević was posthumously declared by the International Criminal Tribunal for the former Yugoslavia to have been part of a criminal enterprise aimed at expelling Bosniaks and Bosnian Croats from Bosnia and Herzegovina during the war.

== Biography ==
Koljević was born to a distinguished merchant family in Banja Luka, then part of the Kingdom of Yugoslavia (now Bosnia and Herzegovina). His elder brother, Svetozar (1930–2016), was a renowned scholar who wrote extensively on Serbian epic poetry. After Yugoslavia's invasion by the Axis powers in April 1941, Bosnia was ceded to the newly created Independent State of Croatia, under the control of the Ustaše. Koljević's father was arrested; upon his release the family fled to Belgrade, where they stayed until the end of World War II.

After finishing school in Banja Luka, Koljević studied English at the University of Belgrade. He graduated with a dissertation on the American New Criticism in 1966, and later became noted as one of Yugoslavia's foremost Shakespeare scholars. During the 1970s and 1980s, he taught at the University of Sarajevo.

At the first multi-party elections in 1990, Koljević was elected a Serb member of the Bosnia-Herzegovina's collective presidency, along with Biljana Plavšić. In April 1992, he left the presidency and joined in the creation of the Republika Srpska, based in Pale outside Sarajevo. He occupied the post of vice-president during the Bosnian War.

Perceived as relatively pragmatic compared to the rest of the Bosnian Serb leadership, Koljević signed the Dayton Peace Agreement on behalf of the Republika Srpska in Paris in 1995. When Radovan Karadžić was forced to resign as president of Republika Srpska in July 1996, the Western powers expected Koljević to succeed him. The office was instead taken up by Biljana Plavšić, while Momčilo Krajišnik became the Serb representative on Bosnia's collective presidency; Koljević was denoted to the rank of a political advisor.

On 16 January 1997, Koljević tried to commit suicide by shooting himself twice in the head. Put in a coma, he died a week later in a Belgrade hospital.

=== Personal life ===
Koljević's oldest son Đorđe was killed in a skiing accident in Austria in 1975. Another son, Srđan, was a screenwriter and film director. His daughter Bogdana Koljević Griffith is a political philosopher, and a member of the National Assembly of Serbia since 2024.

== International Criminal Tribunal for the former Yugoslavia ==
In the 2016 verdict against Radovan Karadžić, the UN-backed International Criminal Tribunal for the former Yugoslavia (ICTY) identified Koljević as part of a joint criminal enterprise, which included Karadžić. It described Koljević as "particularly extreme in his view" and advocating for the expulsion of Bosnian Muslims in order to create homogeneity of territories, quoting him as saying that it was "impossible for Serbs to live with anyone else":

...the Chamber finds that together with the Accused, Krajišnik, Koljević, and Plavšić shared the intent to effect the common plan to permanently remove Bosnian Muslims and Bosnian Croats from Bosnian Serb claimed territory, and through their positions in the Bosnian Serb leadership and involvement throughout the Municipalities, they contributed to the execution of the common plan from October 1991 until at least 30 November 1995.

Having taught Shakespeare for many years at the University of Sarajevo, his later involvement in Serbian nationalist politics had taken aback his former Muslim students, with many of whom he had remained good friends after graduating, because he had never before shown the slightest trace of prejudice.

== Works ==
- Teorijski osnovi nove kritike, 1967
- O uporednom i sporednom, 1977
- Ikonoborci i ikonobranitelji, 1978
- Šekspir, tragičar, 1981
- Pesnik iza pesme, 1984
- "Tajna" poznog Dučića: interpretacija, 1985
- "Lament nad Beogradom" Miloša Crnjanskog, 1986
- Klasici srpskog pesništva, 1987
- Otadžbinske teme, 1995
- Andrićevo remek-delo, 1995
- Od Platona do Dejtona: (zapisi o državi našim povodom), 1996
