= Donji Petrovići =

Donji Petrovići Доњи Петровићи
- Village
- Location within Bosnia and Herzegovina
- Coordinates: 44°54′N 16°17′E
- Country: Bosnia and Herzegovina
- Entity: Republika Srpska
- Municipality: Krupa na Uni

Area
  - Total: 6.26 km^{2} (2.42 sq mi)

Population (2013)
  - Total: 196
- Time zone: UTC+1 (CET)
  - Summer (DST): UTC+2 (CEST)

Donji Petrovići (Serbian Cyrillic: Доњи Петровићи) is a village in the municipality of Krupa na Uni, part of the Republika Srpska entity of Bosnia and Herzegovina. The village is made up of mostly ethnic Serbs. The closest city to Donji Petrovići is Novi Grad (Formerly Bosanski Novi). The population of the village has decreased drastically during the time of the Yugoslav Wars. From the village, there is a great view of Grmec, one of Bosnia's famous mountains.

== History ==
It was previously part of the Bosanska Krupa municipality. It is approximately 20 minutes from The Una-Sana River. The village is known for their annual celebration for the village patron Saint- Pantaleon, which takes place in August of every year. Family members from all over Europe (sometimes even the world) return to Donji Petrovići for the one weekend in August for celebrations.

Saint Pantaleon is also honoured in the village with having the church named after him—Crkva Sveti Velikom Pantelejmona.

== Demographics ==
According to the 2013 census, its population was 196, all Serbs.

== Notable people ==
- Gojko Kličković, former President of the Government of Republika Srpska
