= Gojko Kličković =

Bosnian Serb politician (born 1955)

- Гојко Кличковић

Prime Minister of Republika Srpska
- In office 18 May 1996 – 31 January 1998
- President: Radovan Karadžić; Biljana Plavšić
- Preceded by: Rajko Kasagić
- Succeeded by: Milorad Dodik

Personal details
- Born: 25 March 1955 (age 71) Donji Petrovići, SFR Yugoslavia
- Party: SDS
- Occupation: Politician

Gojko Kličković (Serbian: Гојко Кличковић; born 25 March 1955) is a Bosnian Serb politician. A member of the Serb Democratic Party, he served as prime minister of Republika Srpska from 1996 to 1998.

Political offices
Preceded by Rajko Kasagić	Prime Minister of Republika Srpska; 1996–1998	Succeeded by Milorad Dodik
