= Aleksa Buha =

Bosnian Serb philosopher

President of the Serb Democratic Party
- In office 19 July 1996 – 1 July 1998
- Preceded by: Radovan Karadžić
- Succeeded by: Dragan Kalinić

Personal details
- Born: 21 November 1939 (age 86) Gacko, Kingdom of Yugoslavia
- Occupation: Philosopher

Aleksa Buha (born 21 November 1939) is a Bosnian Serb philosopher and member of the Academy of Sciences and Arts of the Republika Srpska. During the 1990s, he was the minister of foreign affairs of Republika Srpska. Buha is also a member of the Senate of Republika Srpska.

From 1996 until 1998, he was the President of the Serb Democratic Party (SDS). Buha left the SDS and is a member of the First Serb Democratic Party (PSDS).
