= Petnjica, Šavnik =

Petnjica Петњица
- Village
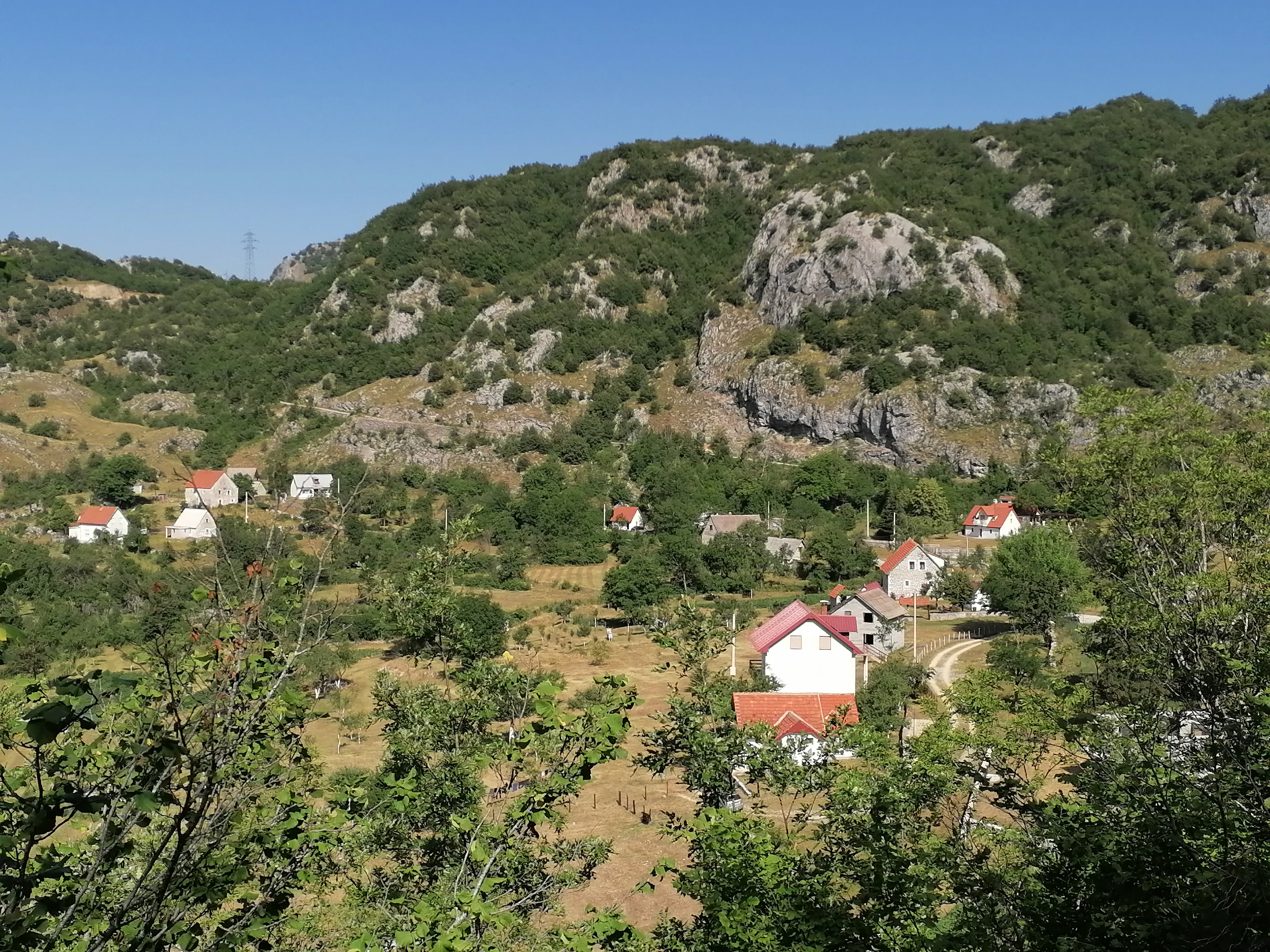

- Location within Montenegro
- Coordinates: 42°58′47″N 19°4′43″E
- Country: Montenegro
- Region: Northern
- Municipality: Šavnik

Population (2011)
  - Total: 26
- Time zone: UTC+1 (CET)
  - Summer (DST): UTC+2 (CEST)

Petnjica (Montenegrin: Петњица) is a village in the municipality of Šavnik, Montenegro. The village is inhabited exclusively by the Karadžić families.

== Demographics ==
According to the 2011 census, its population was 26, all but 5 of them Serbs.

== Notable people ==
- Tomislav Karadžić, president of Serbian Football Association
- Radovan Karadžić, first president of Republika Srpska and convicted war criminal
- Joksim Karadžić, grandfather of philologist and linguist Vuk Stefanović Karadžić
- Milovan Mimov, captain
