= Senate of Republika Srpska =

Consultative body of Republika Srpska, Bosnia and Herzegovina

The Senate of the Republika Srpska (Serbian Cyrillic: Сенат Републике Српске, romanized: Senat Republike Srpske) is a consultative body of the highest institutions of Republika Srpska, an entity within Bosnia and Herzegovina. Its organization and functions are regulated with the Constitution of the Republika Srpska and Law on the Senate of Republika Srpska. According to the initial text of the law of 1997 only Serbs could be appointed as members of the senate. The Venice Commission stated in 2001 that this was discriminatory and obviously unconstitutional. The law has been changed in 2010 and allowed people of any ethnicity to be appointed as members of the senate. Almost all members remain Serbs.

Present or past members of the Senate of Republika Srpska include:

- Smilja Avramov
- Aleksa Buha
- Elena Guskova
- Nenad Kecmanović
- Svetozar Mihajlović
- Borislav Paravac
- Nikola Poplašen
- Radmila Smiljanić
- Milan Tomić
- Aleksandar Vulin
- Bogdana Koljević Griffith (appointed to her first term in 2017 and to her second term in 2024)
