= Biljana Plavšić =

Bosnian Serb politician (1930–2026)

- Биљана Плавшић
- Plavšić in 1996

President of Republika Srpska
- In office 19 July 1996 – 4 November 1998
- Vice President: Nikola Koljević; Dragoljub Mirjanić
- Preceded by: Radovan Karadžić
- Succeeded by: Nikola Poplašen

Vice-President of Republika Srpska
- In office December 1992 – 19 July 1996 Serving with Nikola Koljević
- President: Radovan Karadžić
- Preceded by: Office established
- Succeeded by: Dragoljub Mirjanić

Serb member of the Presidency of Bosnia and Herzegovina
- In office 20 December 1990 – 9 April 1992 Serving with Nikola Koljević
- Preceded by: Office established
- Succeeded by: Nenad Kecmanović

Personal details
- Born: 7 July 1930 Tuzla, Kingdom of Yugoslavia
- Died: 1 October 2026 (aged 96) Belgrade, Serbia
- Party: Serb National Alliance (1997–2006); Serb Democratic Party (1990–1997)
- Education: University of Zagreb
- Nickname: Serb Iron Lady

Biljana Plavšić (Serbian Cyrillic: Биљана Плавшић; 7 July 1930 – 1 October 2026) was a Bosnian Serb politician, academic and scientist who served as President of Republika Srpska from 1996 to 1998. She also served as the Serb member of the Presidency of Bosnia and Herzegovina alongside Nikola Koljević from 1990 to 1992, and the first woman to reach this office. Plavšić was convicted of crimes against humanity for her role in the Bosnian War. Before entering politics, she taught biology at the University of Sarajevo.

Plavšić was indicted in 2001 by the International Criminal Tribunal for the former Yugoslavia (ICTY) for war crimes committed during the Bosnian War. She plea-bargained with the ICTY and was sentenced to 11 years in prison in 2003, to be served in a Swedish prison. She was released on 27 October 2009 after serving two-thirds of her sentence. Plavšić was, together with Radovan Karadžić, the highest-ranking Bosnian Serb politician to be sentenced.

== Early life and academic career ==
Plavšić was born on 7 July 1930 in Tuzla, then part of the Kingdom of Yugoslavia. She was the second child of a local high school biology professor and a housewife. Her family moved to Sarajevo when she was four. As a child, she witnessed the execution of Serbs in the streets and lost relatives during the Ustaše purges following the Nazi occupation of Bosnia.

She got a degree in biology, was a university professor teaching biology at the University of Sarajevo and was elected the Dean of the Faculty of Natural Sciences and Mathematics in 1987. She was a Fulbright Scholar, and as such she spent two years at Boyce-Thompson institute at Cornell University in New York doing botany research, getting a PhD. She then specialized in electron microscopy in London, and plant virology in Prague and Bari. She published over one hundred scientific works and papers.

== Political career ==
Plavšić was a member of the Serb Democratic Party (SDS). She was the first female member of the Presidency of the Socialist Republic of Bosnia and Herzegovina, serving from 18 November 1990 until April 1992 after having been elected in the first multi-party elections in 1990 in Bosnia and Herzegovina. From 28 February 1992 to 12 May 1992, Plavšić became one of the two acting presidents (alongside Nikola Koljević) of the self-proclaimed Serb Republic of Bosnia and Herzegovina. Thereafter she became one of two Vice-presidents of the Republika Srpska and from 30 November 1992 she was a member of the Supreme Command of the armed forces of the Republika Srpska.

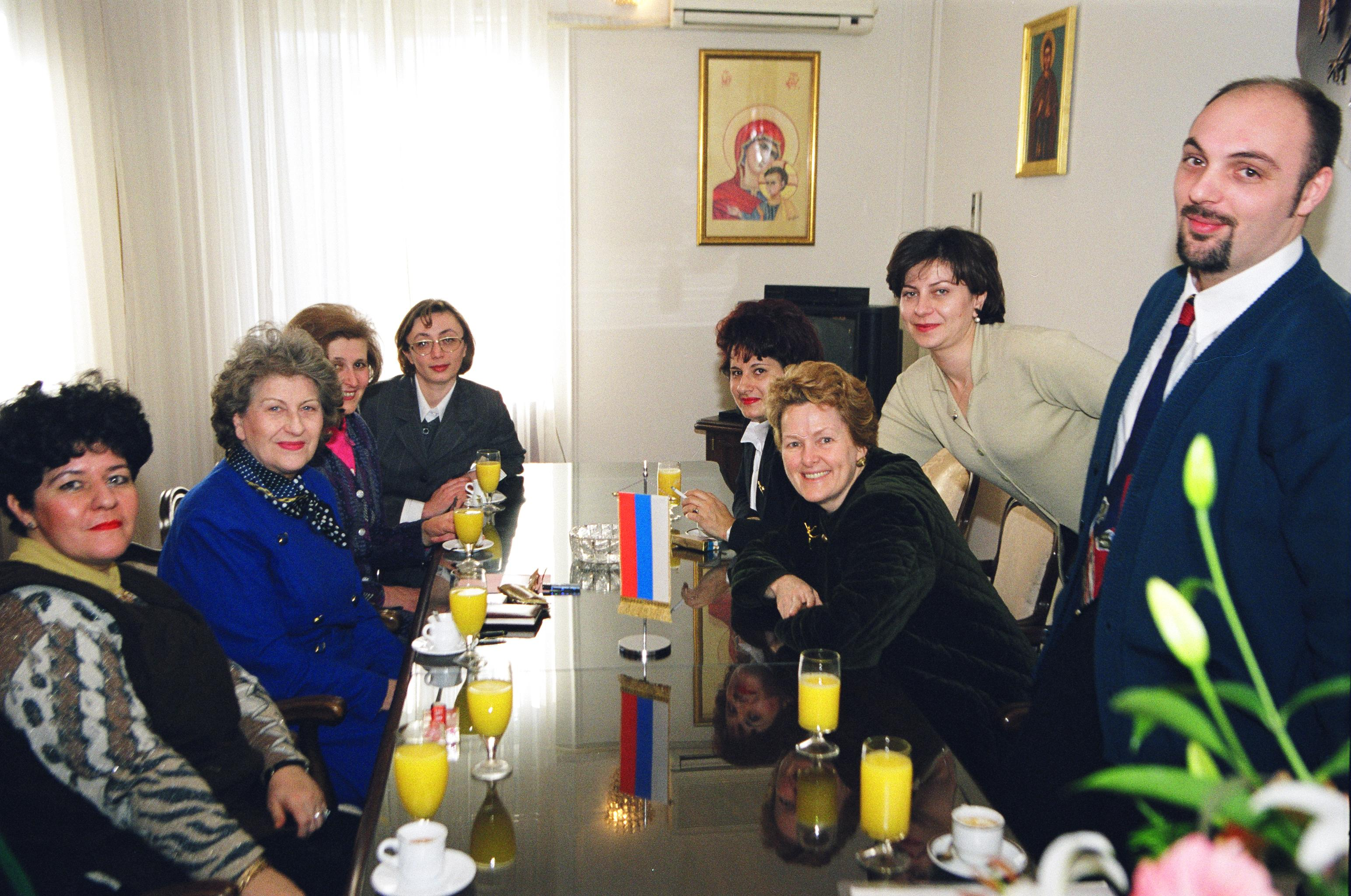
Plavšić and other Bosnian Serb women leaders in Banja Luka

She declared that "six million Serbs can die so that the remaining six million can live in freedom" and considered the ethnic cleansing carried out against non-Serbs during the war to be a "natural phenomenon". In July 1993, in a statement to Borba, Plavšić reportedly claimed that Bosnian Serbs are ethnically-racially superior to Bosnian Muslims and claimed that:

Serbs in Bosnia, particularly in the border areas, have developed a keen ability to sense danger to the whole nation and have developed a defense mechanism. In my family they used to say that the Serbs in Bosnia were much better than Serbs in Serbia [...] and remember, the defense mechanism was not created through a short period of time; it take decades, centuries [...] I am a biologist and I know: most capable of adapting and surviving are those species that live close to other species from whom they are endangered.

In 1994, Plavšić stated that she and other Serbian nationalists were unable to negotiate with Bosniaks due to genetics:

It was genetically deformed material that embraced Islam. And now, of course, with each successive generation it simply becomes concentrated. It gets worse and worse. It simply expresses itself and dictates their style of thinking, which is rooted in their genes. And through the centuries, the genes degraded further.

This statement by Plavšić was cited by Islamic studies scholar Michael Sells as an example of the pseudoscientific racial hygiene.

The Dayton Agreement, signed in 1995, banned the then President of Republika Srpska Radovan Karadžić from office and Plavšić was chosen to run as the SDS candidate for President of the Republika Srpska for a two-year mandate. She later got elected in the 1996 presidential election.

Vojislav Šešelj, at the Slobodan Milošević trial, described Karadžić's motives for nominating her.

She held very extremist positions during the war, insufferably extremist, even for me, and they bothered even me as a declared Serb nationalist. She brought Arkan and his Serb Volunteer Guard to Bijeljina, and she continued to visit him after their activities in Bijeljina and the surrounding area [...] Radovan Karadzic [...] believed her to be more extreme than himself in every way. He thought that the Western protagonists who tried eliminate him at any cost would have an even greater problem with her [...] Radovan Karadzic believed that she would continue to occupy her patriotic positions until the end. However, several months after she was elected, Biljana Plavsic changed her political orientation by 180 degrees under the influence of some Western protagonists and changed her policies completely.

Plavšić severed her ties with the SDS in 1997 and formed Srpski narodni savez (Serbian People's Alliance of the Republika Srpska), and nominated Milorad Dodik, the then member of the National Assembly of the Republika Srpska whose SNSD party had only two MPs, for Prime Minister. As a candidate of the reform "Sloga" coalition, she lost the 1998 election to the joint candidate of the SDS and the Serbian Radical Party of the Republika Srpska, Nikola Poplašen. During her time in prison, she released a book called "Witnessings" (Svjedočenja), revealing many aspects of the political life of the war-time Republika Srpska. In 1998, Plavšić conferred an honorary award on Momčilo Đujić, a Chetnik commander who collaborated extensively with the Italian and then the German occupying forces against the communist-led Partisan insurgency. In 2000 she resigned from the National Assembly and retired from politics.

== ICTY sentence and release ==
Plavšić was indicted by the International Criminal Tribunal for the Former Yugoslavia together with Momčilo Krajišnik and Radovan Karadžić for the "creation of impossible conditions of life, persecution and terror tactics in order to encourage non-Serbs to leave the area, deportation of those reluctant to leave, and the liquidation of others". The Indictment charged Biljana Plavšić as follows:

- Two counts of genocide (Article 4 of the Statute of the Tribunal – genocide; and/or, complicity to commit genocide)
- Five counts of crimes against humanity (Article 5 thereof – extermination; murder; persecutions on political, racial and religious grounds; deportation; alternatively, inhumane acts)
- One count of violations of the laws or customs of war (Article 3 thereof – murder)

She voluntarily surrendered to the ICTY on 10 January 2001, and was provisionally released on 6 September.

On 16 December 2002, Plavšić plea bargained with the ICTY to enter a guilty plea to one count of crimes against humanity for her part in directing the war and targeting civilians and expressed "full remorse" in exchange for prosecutors dropping seven other war crimes charges, including two counts of genocide. Plavšić's statement, read in her native Serbian language, repeated her admission of guilt. It said she had refused to believe stories of atrocities against Bosniaks and Croats and accepted without question the claims that Serbs were fighting for survival.

Plavšić in 2021 after recovering from COVID-19

In an interview Plavšić gave in March 2005 to the Banja Luka Alternativna Television, however, she admitted she had pleaded guilty because she could not prove her innocence, as she was unable to find witnesses who would testify on her behalf. She repeated this in an interview for Swedish Vi magazine in January 2009. She claimed to have pleaded guilty in order to avoid the remaining charges against her, including genocide, and a long trial. Her pleading guilty led the Hague tribunal to lower her sentence and drop the remaining charges. Plavšić would have likely have been sentenced to 20–25 years in prison if she had not pleaded guilty and all eight charges would have been taken into account.

Plavšić was sentenced to 11 years in prison. She served her sentence at the women's prison Hinseberg in Frövi, Örebro County, Sweden (since 26 June 2003). In December 2008, the Swedish Ministry of Justice rejected a request for pardon by Plavšić. She had cited "advancing age, failing health and poor prison conditions" as the reasons for her request. Željko Komšić, a Croat member of the Presidency of Bosnia and Herzegovina had written a letter to the Swedish authorities in September 2008 urging them not to release Plavšić, stating that "any act of mercy would be big mistake and an insult to the victims and families of the victims".

On 14 September 2009, Patrick Robinson, President of the United Nations' International Criminal Tribunal for the Former Yugoslavia, told The New York Times that Plavšić "appears to have demonstrated substantial evidence of rehabilitation" and had accepted responsibility for her crimes. The Times added that "Under Swedish law, she becomes eligible for release 27 October, after serving two-thirds of her term, though her release date has not been set." She was released on 27 October 2009. On the same day, Milorad Dodik, Prime Minister of Republika Srpska, provided an RS government jet to pick up Plavšić and welcomed her to Belgrade after her early release from a Swedish prison. Dodik cited "purely moral reasons" for doing so. On 10 November 2009, Dodik revealed that he seriously considered giving Plavšić an office in the Senate. He stated "we are working on revising the law on the President of the Republic, which would award Plavšić, and other former presidents, the opportunity to enjoy some privileges like the office, monetary compensation, counselor, secretary, official car with a driver and so forth."

After her release, Plavšić lived reclusively in Belgrade, where she died on 1 October 2026, at the age of 96. On 7 October, Plavšić was buried in Banja Luka.

== Awards and decorations ==
Award or decoration	Giver
Order of the Republika Srpska	Republika Srpska
Medal For Bravery Miloš Obilić	Arkan

== See also ==
- Bosnian genocide
- Serbian war crimes in the Yugoslav Wars
