= Nikola Poplašen =

Bosnian Serb politician (born 1951)

- Никола Поплашен

President of Republika Srpska
- In office 4 November 1998 – 2 September 1999
- Vice President: Mirko Šarović
- Preceded by: Biljana Plavšić
- Succeeded by: Mirko Šarović

Personal details
- Born: 15 December 1951 (age 74) Sombor, Yugoslavia
- Party: Serb Democratic Party (1991–1992); Serbian Radical Party (1992–?)

Nikola Poplašen (Serbian Cyrillic: Никола Поплашен; born 15 December 1951) is a former Bosnian Serb politician. He was the president of Republika Srpska from late 1998 to 1999. He was removed by the High Representative of Bosnia and Herzegovina, Carlos Westendorp, on 5 March 1999. The removal was enforced on 2 September 1999.

Following his removal from the presidency, he also worked as a member of the Senate of Republika Srpska. He testified as a defense witness for Radovan Karadžić in his trial.

== Bosnian War ==
Following the outbreak of the war in Bosnia and Herzegovina, Poplašen left Sarajevo with his family to work for the newly-formed government of Republika Srpska in Pale. There he served as a member of the Advisory of Serb Democratic Party and also personally advised Radovan Karadžić. He left SDS in 1992 and founded the Serbian Radical Party of Republika Srpska. Subsequently, he worked as a commissioner for the government of Republika Srpska in Vogošća up to December 1992. He saw combat and was formally given the title of a Chetnik Vojvoda by Vojislav Šešelj.

== Political career ==
Poplašen ran as the Serbian Radical Party candidate in the 1998 Republika Srpska election. He beat Biljana Plavšić and was elected president of Republika Srpska on 13 September 1998. His victory was received negatively by the government of the United States, which supported Plavšić during the election. High Representative Carlos Westendorp stated that he would recognize Poplašen's victory on the condition that he does not name Momčilo Krajišnik as prime minister. In November 1998, Poplašen attempted to appoint Dragan Kalinić as prime minister, but this was rejected by the Office of the High Representative. On 5 March 1999, Westendorp dismissed Poplašen after he refused to give Milorad Dodik a new mandate as prime minister. Additionally, Westendorp also removed Brčko from Republika Srpska's control, moving it into the administration of Bosnia and Herzegovina. Republika Srpska's National Assembly responded with a vote to cut off relations with Bosnia and Herzegovina, and also ruled that both of Westendorp's decisions were unconstitutional and defied the Dayton Agreement. CBS reported that thousands protested Poplašen's removal in Doboj. Dodik resigned as Prime Minister in protest of the decision to remove Brčko from Republika Srpska's control.

== Later career ==
Poplašen was appointed as a member of the board for the Agency for Development of Higher Education of Bosnia and Herzegovina in November 2015. His appointment was controversial given his background in the war and also due to the unexpected votes he received from some members of the Party of Democratic Action and the Democratic Front.
