= List of vice presidents of Republika Srpska =

Vice presidents of Republika Srpska
- Potpredsjednici Republike Srpske
- Incumbent; Igor Balukčić and Ramiz Salkić since 16 November 2026
- Appointer: Direct popular vote
- Term length: 4 years, renewable once
- Inaugural holder: Biljana Plavšić and Nikola Koljević
- Formation: December 1992
- Website: predsjednikrs.net

This article lists the vice presidents of Republika Srpska.

Since the 2002 general election, in compliance with constitutional changes, the president of Republika Srpska has generally been expected to be a Serb, while the vice presidents are a Bosniak and a Croat.

== List of officeholders ==
=== 1992–2002 ===
Name (Birth–Death)	Portrait	Term of office		Party	President	Notes
Biljana Plavšić (1930–2026)		December 1992	19 July 1996	SDS	Radovan Karadžić	
Nikola Koljević (1936–1997)		December 1992	19 July 1996	SDS	Radovan Karadžić	
Nikola Koljević (1936–1997)		December 1992	14 September 1996	SDS	Biljana Plavšić	
Dragoljub Mirjanić (born 1954)		14 September 1996	4 November 1998	SDS	Biljana Plavšić	
Mirko Šarović (born 1956)		4 November 1998	26 January 2000	SDS	Nikola Poplašen	
Dragan Čavić (born 1958)		26 January 2000	28 November 2002	SDS	Mirko Šarović	

=== 2002–present ===
Bosniak vice-president					Croat vice-president					President
Name (Birth–Death)	Portrait	Term of office		Party	Name (Birth–Death)	Portrait	Term of office		Party	President
Adil Osmanović (born 1963)		28 November 2002	15 November 2010	SDA	Ivan Tomljenović (born 1942)		28 November 2002	9 November 2006	SDP BiH	Dragan Čavić
Adil Osmanović (born 1963)		28 November 2002	15 November 2010	SDA	Davor Čordaš (born 1959)		9 November 2006	15 November 2010	HDZ BiH	Milan Jelić
Adil Osmanović (born 1963)		28 November 2002	15 November 2010	SDA	Davor Čordaš (born 1959)		9 November 2006	15 November 2010	HDZ BiH	Rajko Kuzmanović
Enes Suljkanović (born 1961)		15 November 2010	24 November 2014	SDP BiH	Emil Vlajki (born 1942)		15 November 2010	24 November 2014	NDS	Milorad Dodik
Ramiz Salkić (born 1973)		24 November 2014	15 November 2022	SDA	Josip Jerković (born 1959)		24 November 2014	15 November 2022	HDZ BiH	Milorad Dodik
Ramiz Salkić (born 1973)		24 November 2014	15 November 2022	SDA	Josip Jerković (born 1959)		24 November 2014	15 November 2022	HDZ BiH	Željka Cvijanović
Ćamil Duraković (born 1979)		15 November 2022	16 November 2026	Independent	Davor Pranjić (born 1994)		15 November 2022	16 November 2026	HDZ BiH	Milorad Dodik
Ćamil Duraković (born 1979)		15 November 2022	16 November 2026	Independent	Davor Pranjić (born 1994)		15 November 2022	16 November 2026	HDZ BiH	Siniša Karan
Ramiz Salkić (born 1973)		16 November 2026	Incumbent	SDA	Igor Balukčić (born 1983)		16 November 2026	Incumbent	HDZ 1990	Savo Minić

== See also ==
- President of Republika Srpska
  - List of presidents of Republika Srpska
- List of prime ministers of Republika Srpska
- List of speakers of the National Assembly of Republika Srpska
