= Serbian Radical Party of Republika Srpska =

Serbian Radical Party of Republika Srpska Српска радикална странка Републике Српске Srpska radikalna stranka Republike Srpske
- Leader: Milanko Mihajlica
- Founder: Nikola Poplašen
- Founded: 12 February 1992
- Dissolved: April 2019
- Split from: SDS
- Merged into: PDP
- Ideology: Serbian nationalism National conservatism Pro-Europeanism
- Political position: Right-wing
- National affiliation: SDS-SRS RS-PUPS

The Serbian Radical Party of Republika Srpska (Serbian: Српска радикална странка Републике Српске/Srpska radikalna stranka Republike Srpske or СРС РС/SRS RS) was a Serb centre-right political party in Bosnia and Herzegovina, active in Republika Srpska. It was founded in 1992 by Nikola Poplašen, a former Serbian Democratic Party member. SRS RS has since affiliated itself with the Serbian Progressive Party, a pro-EU offshoot of the Serbian Radical Party established in 2008. In April 2019, most of the SRS's membership joined the Party of Democratic Progress (PDP), and the SRS de facto merged with the PDP.

== Parliamentary elections ==
Parliament of Republika Srpska
Year	Popular vote	% of popular vote	# of seats	Seat change	Coalition	Government
1996	72.517	6.7%	6 / 83	—N/a	—	government
1997	124.746	18.07%	15 / 83	▲9	—	opposition
1998	97.244	13.1%	11 / 83	▼4	—	opposition
2000	Banned		0 / 83	▼11	—	non-parliamentary
2002	22.396	4.4%	4 / 83	▲4	—	government
2006	16.454	2.92%	2 / 83	▼2	—	opposition
2010	15.166	2.39%	1 / 83	▼1	—	opposition
2014	173.824	26.26%	2 / 83	▲1	SDS	opposition

== Positions held ==
Major positions held by SRS RS members:

President of Republika Srpska	Years
Nikola Poplašen	1998–1999
