= Radovan Karadžić =

Bosnian Serb politician and war criminal (born 1945)

- Радован Караџић
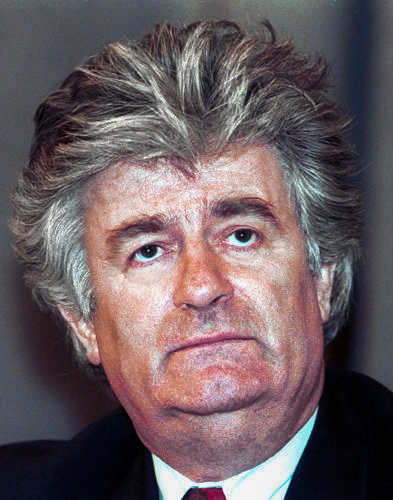
- Karadžić in 1994

President of Republika Srpska
- In office 7 April 1992 – 19 July 1996
- Vice President: Biljana Plavšić; Nikola Koljević
- Preceded by: Position established
- Succeeded by: Biljana Plavšić

President of the Serb Democratic Party
- In office 12 July 1990 – 19 July 1996
- Preceded by: Position established
- Succeeded by: Aleksa Buha

Personal details
- Born: 19 June 1945 (age 81) Petnjica, FS Montenegro, Yugoslavia
- Citizenship: Bosnia and Herzegovina
- Party: Serb Democratic Party (1990–2001)
- Spouse: Ljiljana Zelen Karadžić (died 2026)
- Children: 2, including Sonja
- Education: University of Sarajevo; Columbia Medical School
- Profession: Psychiatrist
- Criminal information
- Convictions: Genocide, crimes against humanity, war crimes
- Penalty: Life imprisonment

Details
- Date apprehended: 21 July 2008
- Imprisoned at: HM Prison Parkhurst

Radovan Karadžić (Serbian Cyrillic: Радован Караџић, pronounced [râdovaːn kâradʒitɕ]; born 19 June 1945) is a Bosnian Serb former politician who served as the president of Republika Srpska during the Bosnian War. He was convicted of genocide, crimes against humanity, and war crimes by the International Criminal Tribunal for the former Yugoslavia (ICTY).

Trained as a psychiatrist, he co-founded the Serb Democratic Party in Bosnia and Herzegovina and served as the first president of Republika Srpska from 1992 to 1996. He was a fugitive from 1996 until July 2008, after having been indicted for war crimes by the ICTY. The indictment concluded there were reasonable grounds for believing he committed war crimes, including genocide against Bosniak and Croat civilians during the Bosnian War (1992–1995). While a fugitive, he worked at a private clinic in Belgrade, specializing in alternative medicine and psychology, under an alias.

He was arrested in Belgrade in 2008 and brought before Belgrade's War Crimes Court a few days later. Extradited to the Netherlands, he was placed in the custody of the ICTY in the United Nations Detention Unit of Scheveningen, where he was charged with 11 counts of war crimes and crimes against humanity. He is sometimes referred to by the Western media as the "Butcher of Bosnia", a sobriquet also applied to former Army of Republika Srpska (VRS) General Ratko Mladić. In 2016, he was found guilty of the genocide in Srebrenica, war crimes, and crimes against humanity, 10 of the 11 charges in total, and sentenced to 40 years' imprisonment. In 2019, an appeal he had filed against his conviction was rejected, and the sentence was increased to life imprisonment. He is serving his sentence in a British prison, HMP Parkhurst on the Isle of Wight.

== Early life and education ==
Radovan Karadžić was born to a Serb family on 19 June 1945 in the village of Petnjica in Montenegro, Yugoslavia, near Šavnik. Karadžić's father, Vuko (1912–1987), was a cobbler from Petnjica. His mother, Jovanka (née Jakić; 1922–2005), was a peasant girl from Pljevlja. She married Karadžić's father in 1943, aged twenty. Karadžić claims to be a descendant of the Serbian linguistic reformer Vuk Stefanović Karadžić (1787–1864), although as of 2014 this claim had not been confirmed.

His father had been a Chetnik – i.e. a member of the right-wing army of the Kingdom of Yugoslavia's government-in-exile during World War II – and was imprisoned by the post-war communist regime for much of his son's childhood. Karadžić moved to Sarajevo in 1960 to study psychiatry at the Sarajevo University School of Medicine. In spite of the fact that his father fought in a war, Karadžić himself held no military-orientated ambitions. It is widely believed that he never served his then-obligatory one-year long military service within the Yugoslav People's Army, as such claim was given by Stjepan Kljujić, who was a Croat-member of the Bosnian rotating presidency.

Karadžić studied neurotic disorders and depression at Næstved Hospital in Denmark in 1970 and during 1974 and 1975 he underwent further medical training at Columbia University in New York. After his return to Yugoslavia, he worked in the Koševo Hospital in Sarajevo. He was also a poet, influenced by Serbian writer Dobrica Ćosić, who encouraged him to go into politics. During his spell as an ecologist, he declared that "Bolshevism is bad, but nationalism is even worse".

== Financial misdeeds ==
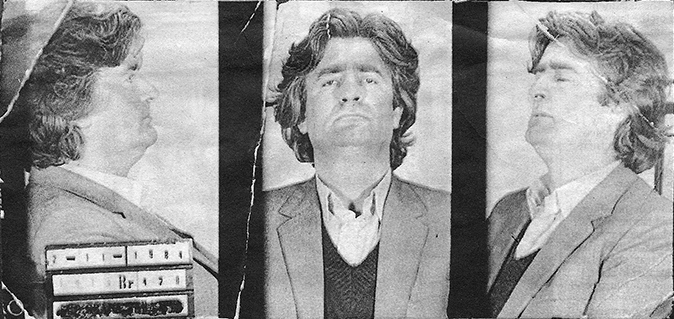
File picture taken upon Karadžić's arrest in November 1984

Soon after graduation, Karadžić started working in a treatment centre at the psychiatric clinic of the main Sarajevo hospital, Koševo. According to testimony, he often boosted his income by issuing false medical and psychological evaluations to healthcare workers who wanted early retirement or to criminals who tried to avoid punishment by pleading insanity. In 1983, Karadžić started working at a hospital in the Belgrade suburb of Voždovac. With his partner Momčilo Krajišnik, then manager of a mining enterprise Energoinvest, he managed to gain a loan from an agricultural-development fund, and they used it to build themselves houses in Pale, a Serb town above Sarajevo turned into a ski resort by the government.

On 1 November 1984, the two men were arrested for fraud and spent 11 months in detention before their friend Nikola Koljević managed to bail them out. Due to a lack of evidence, Karadžić was released and his trial was brought to a halt. The trial was revived, however, and on 26 September 1985 Karadžić was sentenced to three years in prison for embezzlement and fraud. As he had already spent a year in detention, Karadžić did not serve the remaining sentence in prison.

== Political life ==
Following encouragement from Dobrica Ćosić, later the first president of the Federal Republic of Yugoslavia, and Jovan Rašković, leader of the Croatian Serbs, Karadžić cofounded the Serb Democratic Party (Srpska Demokratska Stranka) in Bosnia and Herzegovina in 1989. The party aimed at unifying the Republic's Bosnian Serb community and joining Croatian Serbs in leading them in remaining as part of Yugoslavia in the event of secession by those two republics from the federation.

Throughout September 1991, the SDS began to establish various "Serb Autonomous Regions" throughout Bosnia-Herzegovina. After the Bosnian parliament voted on sovereignty on 15 October 1991, a separate Serb Assembly was founded on 24 October 1991 in Banja Luka, to exclusively represent the Serbs in Bosnia and Herzegovina. The following month, Bosnian Serbs held a referendum which resulted in an overwhelming vote in favour of staying in a federal state with Serbia and Montenegro, as part of Yugoslavia. In December 1991, a top secret document, For the organisation and activity of the Serbian people in Bosnia-Herzegovina in extraordinary circumstances, was drawn up by the SDS leadership. This was a centralised programme for the takeover of each municipality in the country, through the creation of shadow governments and para-governmental structures through various "crisis headquarters", and by preparing loyalist Serbs for the takeover in co-ordination with the Yugoslav People's Army (JNA).

On 9 January 1992, the Bosnian Serb Assembly proclaimed the Republic of the Serb People of Bosnia and Herzegovina (Република српског народа Босне и Херцеговине/Republika srpskog naroda Bosne i Hercegovine). On 28 February 1992, the constitution of the Serb Republic of Bosnia and Herzegovina was adopted. It declared that the state's territory included Serb autonomous regions, municipalities, and other Serbian ethnic entities in Bosnia and Herzegovina, as well as "all regions in which the Serbian people represent a minority due to the Second World War genocide" (although how this was established was never specified), and that it was to be a part of the federal Yugoslav state. On 29 February and 1 March 1992 a referendum on the independence of Bosnia and Herzegovina from Yugoslavia was held. Many Serbs boycotted the referendum and pro-independence Bosniaks (Bosnian Muslims) and Croats turned out.

=== President of Republika Srpska ===
On 6 and 7 April 1992, Bosnia and Herzegovina was recognized as an independent state by the European Community and the United States. It was admitted as a member to the United Nations on 22 May 1992.

Karadžić was voted President of Republika Srpska, the Bosnian Serb administration, in Pale on about 13 May 1992 after the breakup of the Socialist Federal Republic of Yugoslavia. At the time he assumed this position, his de jure powers, as described in the constitution of the Bosnian Serb administration, included commanding the army of the Bosnian Serb administration in times of war and peace, and having the authority to appoint, promote and discharge officers of the army. Karadžić made three trips to the UN in New York in February and March 1993 for negotiations on the future of Bosnia.

He went to Moscow in 1994 for meetings with Russian officials on the Bosnian situation. In 1994, the Greek Orthodox Church declared Karadžić "one of the most prominent sons of our Lord Jesus Christ working for peace", and decorated him with the nine-hundred-year-old Knights' Order of the First Rank of Saint Dionysius of Xanthe. Ecumenical Patriarch Bartholomew announced that "the Serbian people have been chosen by God to protect the western frontiers of Orthodoxy".

On Friday 4 August 1995, with a massive Croatian military force poised to attack the Serb-held Krajina region in central Croatia, Karadžić announced he was removing General Ratko Mladić from his commandant post and assuming personal command of the VRS himself. Karadžić blamed Mladić for the loss of two key Serb-held towns in western Bosnia that had recently fallen to the Croats, and he used the loss of the towns as the excuse to announce his surprise command structure changes. General Mladić was demoted to an "adviser". Mladić refused to go quietly, claiming the support of the Bosnian Serb military and the people. Karadžić countered by attempting to pull political rank as well as denouncing Mladić as a "madman", but Mladić's popular support forced Karadžić to rescind his order on 11 August.

=== War crimes charges ===
Karadžić was accused by the International Criminal Tribunal for the former Yugoslavia (ICTY) of personal and command responsibility for numerous war crimes committed against non-Serbs, in his roles as Supreme Commander of the Bosnian Serb armed forces and President of the National Security Council of the Republika Srpska. He was accused by the same authority of being responsible for the deaths of more than 7,500 Bosniaks (Muslims). Under his direction and command, Bosnian Serb forces initiated the Siege of Sarajevo. He was accused by the ICTY of ordering the Srebrenica genocide in 1995, directing Bosnian Serb forces to "create an unbearable situation of total insecurity with no hope of further survival of life" in the UN safe area. He was also accused by the ICTY of ordering that United Nations personnel be taken hostage in May–June 1995.

He was jointly indicted by the International Tribunal for the Former Yugoslavia in 1995, along with General Ratko Mladić. The indictment charged Karadžić on the basis of his individual criminal responsibility (Article 7(1) of the Statute) and superior criminal responsibility (Article 7(3) of the Statute) with:

- Five counts of crimes against humanity (Article 5 of the Statute – extermination, murder, persecutions on political, racial and religious grounds, persecutions, inhumane acts (forcible transfer));
- Three counts of violations of the laws of war (Article 3 of the Statute – murder, unlawfully inflicting terror upon civilians, taking hostages);
- One count of grave breaches of the Geneva Conventions (Article 2 of the Statute – willful killing).
- Unlawful transfer of civilians because of religious or national identity.

The United States government offered a $5 million reward for his and Mladić's arrests.

== Fugitive ==
Authorities missed arresting Karadžić in 1995 when he was an invitee of the United Nations. During his visit to the UN headquarters in 1993, he was handed a service of process for a civil claim under the United States of America's Alien Tort Act. The Courts ruled that Karadžić was properly served and the trial was allowed to proceed in a United States District Court.

Karadžić's ability to evade capture for over a decade increased his esteem among some Bosnian Serbs, despite an alleged deal with Richard Holbrooke. Some sources allege that he received protection from the United States as a consequence of the Dayton Agreement. Holbrooke, however, repeatedly denied that such a deal was ever made.

During his time as fugitive he was helped by several people, including Boško Radonjić and in 2001, hundreds of supporters demonstrated in support of Karadžić in his home town. In March 2003, his mother, Jovanka, publicly urged him to surrender.

British officials conceded military action was unlikely to be successful in bringing Karadžić and other suspects to trial, and that putting political pressure on Balkan governments would be more likely to succeed.

In May 2004, the UN learned that: "the brother of a war crimes suspect allegedly in the process of providing information on Radovan Karadžić and his network to the ICTY, was mistakenly killed in a raid by the Republika Srpska police" and added that "It is being argued that the informer was targeted in order to silence him before he was able to say more."

In 2005, Bosnian Serb leaders called on Karadžić to surrender, stating that Bosnia and Serbia could not move ahead economically or politically while he remained at large. After a failed raid earlier in May, on 7 July 2005 NATO troops arrested Karadžić's son, Aleksandar, but released him after 10 days. On 28 July, Karadžić's wife, Ljiljana, made a call for him to surrender after what she called "enormous pressure".

The BBC reported that Karadžić had been sighted in 2005 near Foča: "38 km (24 miles) down the road, on the edge of the Sutjeska National Park, Radovan Karadžić has just got out of a red Mercedes" and asserted that "Western intelligence agencies knew roughly where they were, but that there was no political will in London or Washington to risk the lives of British, or U.S. agents, in a bid to seize" him and Mladić.

On 10 January 2008, the BBC reported that the passports of his closest relatives had been seized. On 21 February 2008, at the time Kosovo declared independence, portraits of Karadžić were on display during Belgrade's "Kosovo is Serbia protest".

Since 20 April 1999 Karadžić had been masquerading as a "new age" expert in alternative medicine using the fake name "D.D. David" printed on his business cards. The initials apparently stood for "Dragan Dabić"; officials said he was also using the name "Dr. Dragan David Dabić". The identity had been provided to Karadžić in Ruma by BIA, using details of a local construction worker, the actual Dragan Dabić, born 1942. He lived in New Belgrade since at least 2005, working at three private clinics and lecturing in front of hundreds of people on alternative medicine. He had his own website, where he offered his assistance in the treatment of sexual problems and disorders by using what he called "Human Quantum Energy". His biography on the website claimed the birthplace of Kovači near Kraljevo and education at Lomonosov University. In the late 2000s, he published articles about his practices in Zdrav Život health magazine, despite him not being a member of the Serbian Medical Association (SLD) and not providing a medical degree or a résumé to the editor-in-chief, to whom Karadžić claimed an upbringing in Krajina. For the first half of 2008, Karadžić attended various Zdrav Život-sponsored health conventions around Belgrade as a guest speaker, some appearances being featured on local television.

=== Allegedly evading capture in Austria ===
There were reports that Karadžić evaded capture in May 2007 in Vienna, where he lived under the name Petar Glumac, posing as a Croatian seller of herbal solutions and ointments. Austrian police talked to him during the raid regarding an unrelated homicide case in the area where Karadžić lived but failed to recognize his real identity. He had obtained a Croatian passport in the name of Petar Glumac and claimed to be in Vienna for training. The police did not ask any further questions nor demanded to fingerprint him as he appeared calm and readily answered questions. Nevertheless, this claim came into doubt when a man named Petar Glumac, an alternative medical practitioner from Banatsko Novo Selo, Serbia, claimed to have been the person the police talked with in Vienna. Glumac reportedly bears a striking resemblance to Karadžić's appearance as Dragan Dabić. Dragan Karadžić, his nephew, claimed in an interview to the Corriere della Sera that Karadžić attended football matches of Serie A and visited Venice under the name of Petar Glumac.

== Trial ==
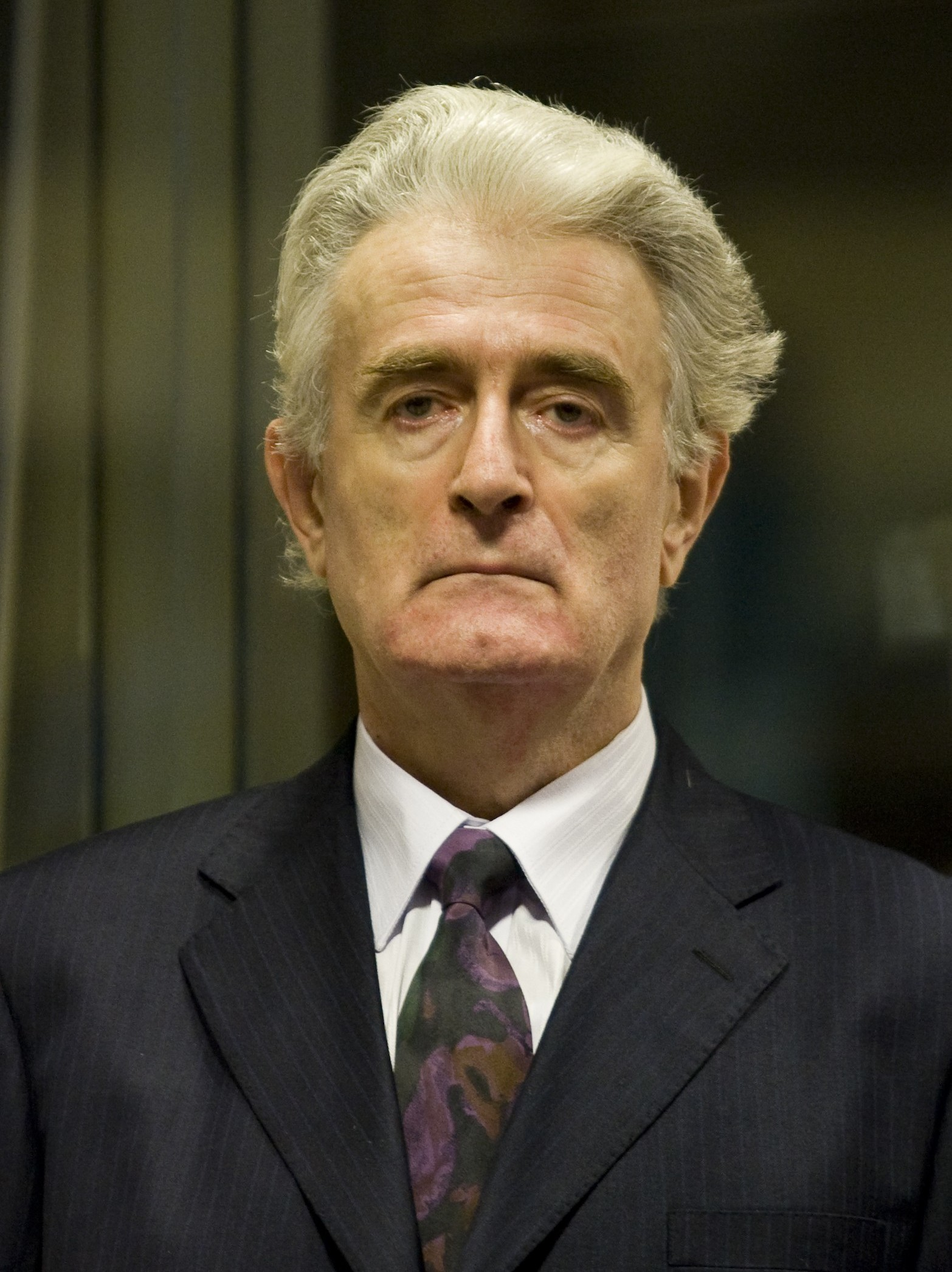
Karadžić at his trial in July 2008

=== Arrest and trial ===
The arrest of Karadžić took place on 21 July 2008 in Batajnica, Belgrade although his lawyer claimed the arrest occurred earlier on 18 July. He was recorded leaving an apartment on Yuri Gagarin Street registered under the name "Maksimović" and boarding a bus bound for Vrdnik, from where he planned to cross into Croatia. He later admitted to having several alternate hide-outs around Serbia and that he had switched residences four times within the month. Karadžić stated that he intended to turn himself in sometime in January 2009, as he believed that any legal recourse against him would be handled by the Serbian government rather than international authorities by the end of the year.

Karadžić was transferred into ICTY custody in The Hague on 30 July. Karadžić appeared before judge Alphons Orie on 31 July, in the tribunal, which has sentenced 64 accused since 1993. During the first hearing Radovan Karadžić expressed a fear for his life by saying: "If Holbrooke wants my death and regrets there is no death sentence at this court, I want to know if his arm is long enough to reach me here." and stated that the deal he made with Richard Holbrooke was the reason why it took 13 years for him to appear in front of the ICTY. He made similar accusations against the former U.S. Secretary of State Madeleine Albright. Muhamed Sacirbey, Bosnian foreign minister at the time, claimed that a Karadžić-Holbrooke deal was made in July 1996.

In August 2008, Karadžić claimed there was a conspiracy against him and refused to enter a plea, whereupon the court entered a plea of not guilty on his behalf to all 11 charges. He called the tribunal, chaired by Scottish judge Iain Bonomy, a "court of NATO" disguised as a court of the international community.

On 13 October 2009, the BBC reported that Karadžić's plea to be granted immunity from his charges was denied. However, the start of his trial was moved to 26 October so he could prepare a defense.

On Monday 26 October 2009, Karadžić's trial was suspended after 15 minutes after he carried out his threat to boycott the start of the hearing. Judge O-Gon Kwon said that in the absence of Karadžić, who was defending himself, or any lawyer representing him, he was suspending the case for 24 hours, when the prosecution would begin its opening statement. On 5 November 2009, the court imposed a lawyer on him, and postponed his trial until 1 March 2010.

On 26 November 2009, Karadžić filed a motion challenging the legal validity and legitimacy of the tribunal, claiming that "the UN Security Council lacked the power to establish the ICTY, violated agreements under international law in so doing, and delegated non-existent legislative powers to the ICTY", to which the Prosecution response was that "The Appeals Chamber has already determined the validity of the Tribunal’s creation in previous decisions which constitute established precedent on this issue", therefore dismissing the Motion. The prosecution started its case on 13 April 2010, and completed it on 25 May 2012. The discovery of more than 300 previously unknown bodies in a mass grave at the Tomasica mine near Prijedor in September 2013 caused a flurry of motions which ended with the court denying reopening prosecutorial evidence. The defence began its case on 16 October 2012 and completed it in March 2014; Karadžić decided not to testify. Closing arguments in the case began on 29 September 2014 and were concluded on 7 October 2014, Karadžić having failed in his demand for a re-trial.

=== Bosnian genocide trial ===
Karadžić and Mladić were placed on trial for charges of genocide, crimes against humanity and war crimes committed in Srebrenica, Prijedor, Ključ, and other districts of Bosnia. They were charged, separately, with:

- Count 1: Genocide.
  - Municipalities: Bratunac, Foča, Ključ, Kotor Varoš, Prijedor, Sanski Most, Vlasenica and Zvornik.
  - On 28 June 2012, the trial chamber granted a defence motion for acquittal on this count as "the evidence, even if taken at its highest, did not reach the level from which a reasonable trier of fact could conclude that genocide occurred in the municipalities [in question]". Motions for acquittal on nine other counts were dismissed. The Appeals Chamber subsequently concluded that the court had erred and reinstated Count 1 on 11 July 2013.
- Count 2: Genocide.
  - Municipality: Srebrenica.
- Count 3: Persecutions on Political, Racial and Religious Grounds, a Crime Against Humanity.
  - Municipalities: Banja Luka, Bijeljina, Bosanska Krupa, Bosanski Novi, Bratunac, Brčko, Foča, Hadžići, Ilidža, Kalinovik, Ključ, Kotor Varoš, Novo Sarajevo, Pale, Prijedor, Rogatica, Sanski Most, Sokolac, Trnovo, Vlasenica, Vogošća, Zvornik, and Srebrenica.
- Count 4: Extermination, a Crime Against Humanity.
- Count 5: Murder, a Crime Against Humanity.
- Count 6: Murder, a Violation of the Laws or Customs of War.
- Count 7: Deportation, a Crime Against Humanity.
- Count 8: Inhumane Acts (forcible transfer), a Crime Against Humanity.
- Count 9: Acts of Violence the Primary Purpose of which is to Spread Terror among the Civilian Population, a Violation of the Laws or Customs of War.
- Count 10: Unlawful Attacks on Civilians, a Violation of the Laws or Customs of War.
- Count 11: Taking of Hostages, a Violation of the Laws or Customs of War.

The Yugoslav war crimes court rejected one of the two genocide charges against Karadžić on 27 June 2012. However, on 11 July 2013, the Appeals Chamber reinstated these charges.

=== Conviction and sentence ===
On 24 March 2016, he was found guilty of genocide, war crimes, and crimes against humanity, and sentenced to 40 years imprisonment. He was found guilty of genocide for the Srebrenica massacre, which aimed to kill "every able-bodied male" in the town and systematically exterminate the Bosnian Muslim community. He was also convicted of persecution, extermination, deportation and forcible transfer (ethnic cleansing), and murder in connection with his campaign to drive Bosnian Muslims and Croats out of villages claimed by Serb forces. He avoided conviction on a second count of genocide in seven Bosnian towns but was found guilty in that case on a reduced charge of extermination.

On 27 February 2018, it was announced by the Mechanism for International Criminal Tribunals that hearings for the appeal against the conviction were set on 23 April 2018. The appeal was rejected on 20 March 2019, and the sentence was increased to life imprisonment. On 12 May 2021, it was announced that, with the agreement of the UK authorities, he would serve the rest of his sentence in a UK prison. The incarceration site has since been identified as HMP Isle of Wight, and specifically the HMP Parkhurst facility.

== Poetry ==
Karadžić published several books of poetry, many of which were published whilst in hiding.

- 1968: Ludo koplje (Svjetlost, Sarajevo)
- 1971: Pamtivek (Svjetlost, Sarajevo)
- 1990: Crna bajka (Svjetlost, Sarajevo)
- 1992: Rat u Bosni: Kako je počelo
- 1994: Ima čuda, nema čuda
- 2001: Od Ludog koplja do Crne bajke (Dobrica knjiga, Novi Sad)
- 2004: Čudesna hronika noći (IGAM, Belgrade)
- 2005: Pod levu sisu veka (Književna zajednica Veljko Vidaković, Niš)

== Awards and decorations ==
- Literary award Jovan Dučić for poetry, 1969
- Literary award Michail Sholokhov on 16 May 1994, by the Union of Russian Writers.
- Knights' Order of the First Rank of Saint Dionysios of Zante, 1994, by the Greek Orthodox Church.
- Order of the Republika Srpska, 1994
- Order of Andrew the First-Called, 1995, by the Moscow Fund.
