= Politics of Republika Srpska =

This article is about the politics of Republika Srpska, one of the two entities that together comprise the state of Bosnia and Herzegovina, the other being the Federation of Bosnia and Herzegovina.

== Presidents of Republika Srpska ==
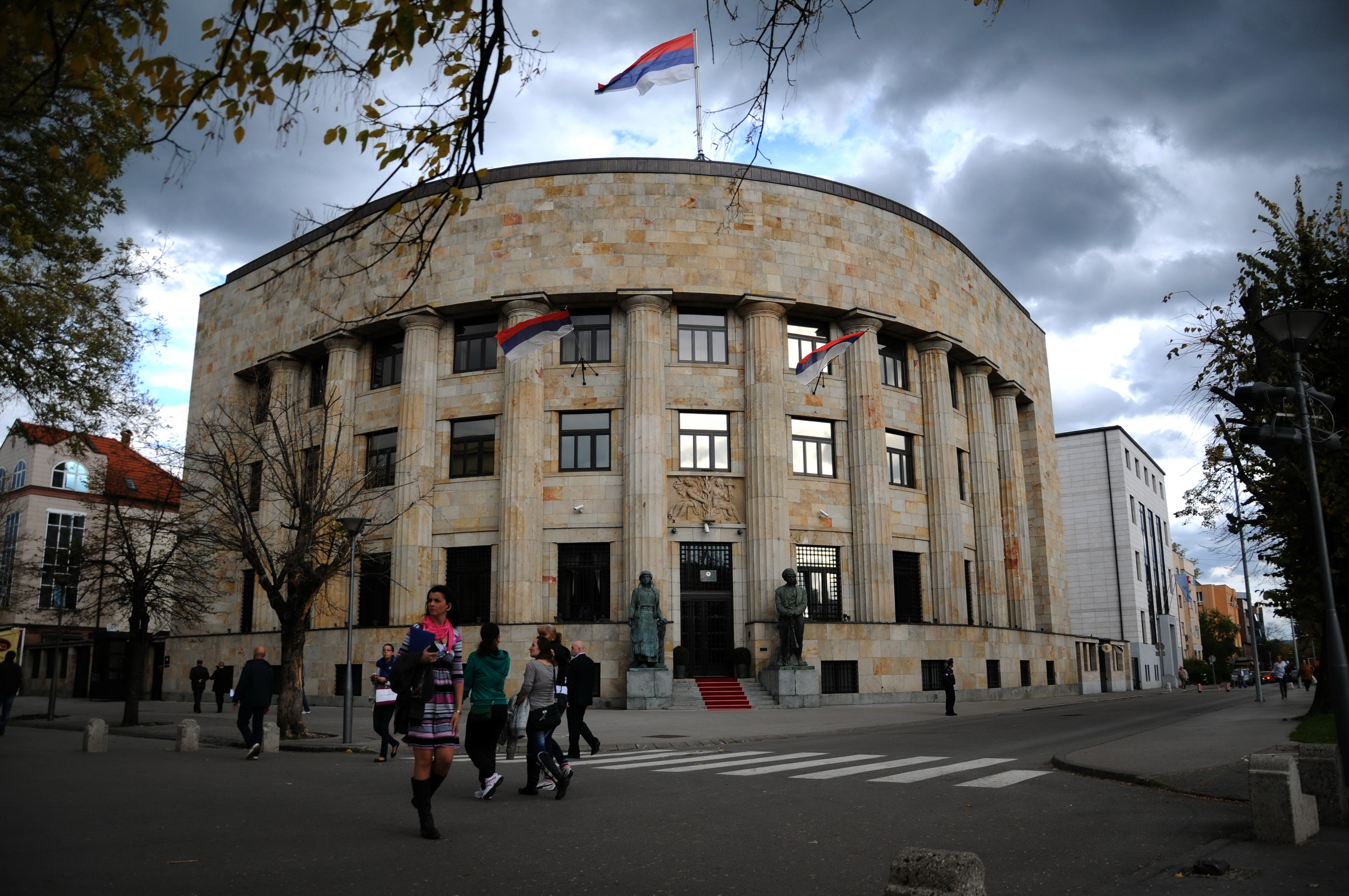
Palace of the Republic, the official residence of the President

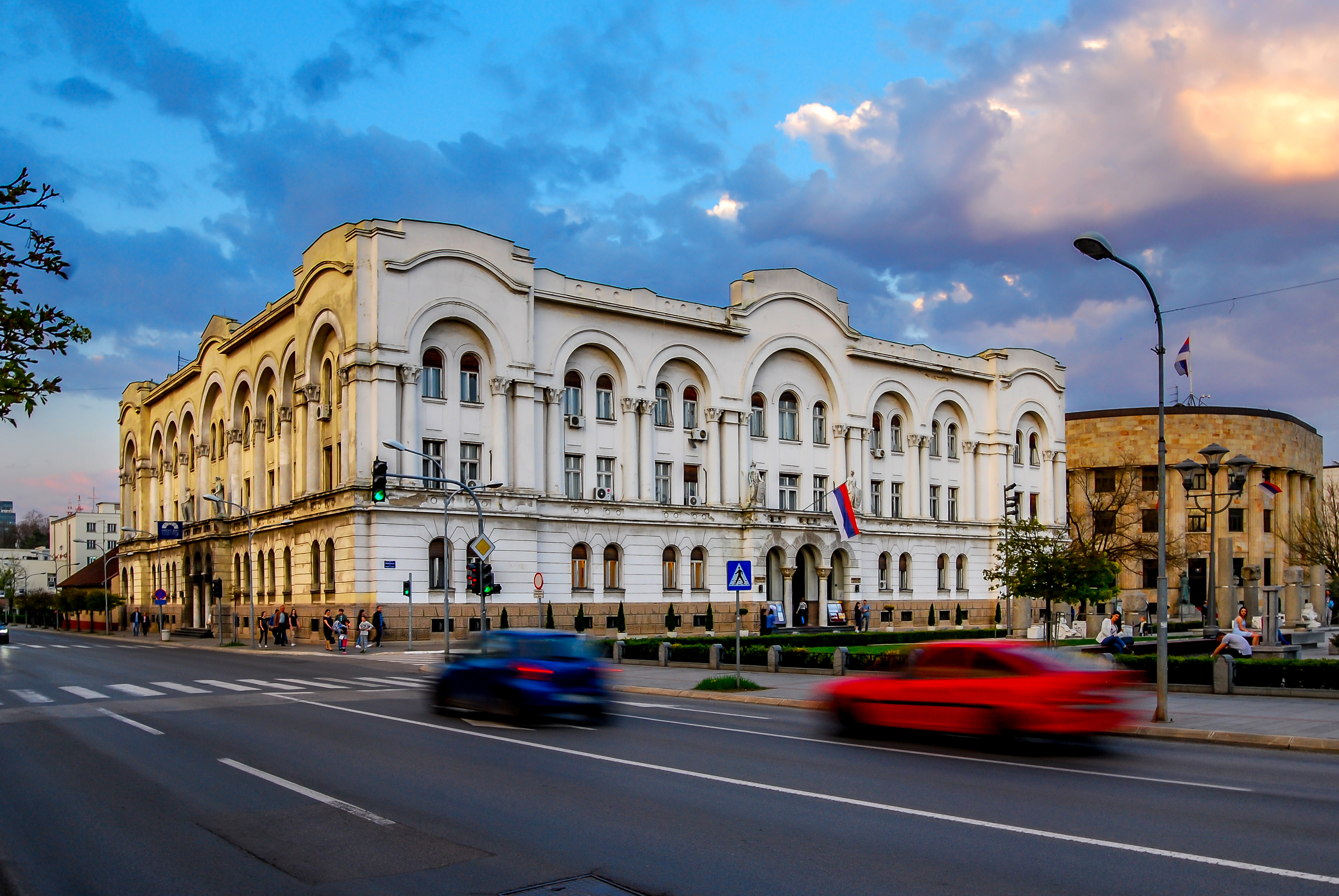
Banski dvor, the former residence of the President

- Radovan Karadžić (7 April 1992 – 19 July 1996) (SDS)
- Biljana Plavšić (19 July 1996 – 4 November 1998) (SDS/SNS RS) (expelled from SDS in July 1997 and formed SNS RS)
- Nikola Poplašen (4 November 1998 – 26 January 2000) (SRS RS) (removed by High Representative on 5 March 1999; removal enforced on 2 September 1999)
- Mirko Šarović (26 January 2000 – 28 November 2002) (SDS) (not recognized as president by High Representative until 16 December 2000)
- Dragan Čavić (28 November 2002 – 9 November 2006) (SDS)
- Milan Jelić (9 November 2006 – 30 September 2007) (SNSD)
- Igor Radojičić (acting President) (1 October 2007 – 9 December 2007) (SNSD)
- Rajko Kuzmanović (9 December 2007 – 15 November 2010) (SNSD)
- Milorad Dodik (15 November 2010 – 19 November 2018) (SNSD)
- Željka Cvijanović (19 November 2018 – 15 November 2022) (SNSD)
- Milorad Dodik (15 November 2022 – 12 June 2025) (SNSD)
- Nenad Stevandić (acting President) (18 August 2025 - present)

== National Assembly ==
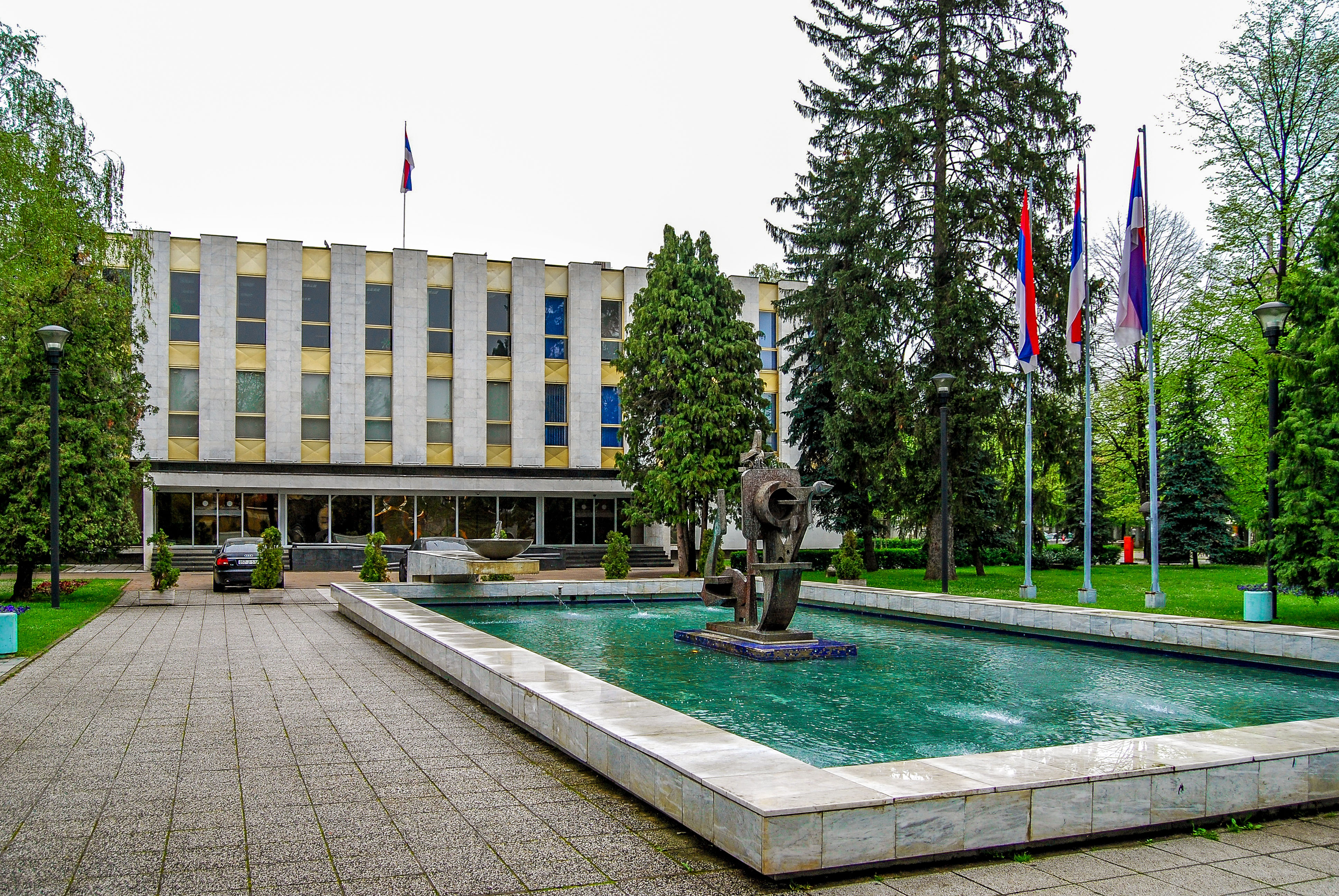
House of the National Assembly

The current National Assembly of the Republika Srpska (Народна Скупштина Републике Српске / Narodna Skupština Republike Srpske) is the ninth since the founding of the Republika Srpska.

- First Assembly (24 October 1991 – 14 September 1996)
- Second Assembly (19 October 1996 – 27 December 1997) (election of 4 September 1996)
- Third Assembly (27 December 1997 – 19 October 1998) (election of 22–23 November 1997)
- Fourth Assembly (19 October 1998 – 16 December 2000) (election of 13 September 1998)
- Fifth Assembly (16 December 2000 – 28 November 2002) (election of 11 September 2000)
- Sixth Assembly (28 November 2002 – 30 November 2006) (election of 5 October 2002)
- Seventh Assembly (30 November 2006 – 15 November 2010) (election of 1 October 2006)
- Eighth Assembly (15 November 2010 – 24 November 2014) (election of 3 October 2010)
- Ninth Assembly (24 November 2014 – 7 October 2018) (election of 12 October 2014)
- Tenth Assembly (7 October 2018 – present) (election of 7 October 2018)

The political composition of the Tenth Convocation of the National Assembly of Republika Srpska (and the change in number of seats from the Ninth Convocation):

- Alliance of Independent Social Democrats 28 (-1)
- Serb Democratic Party–SRS RS–SRS 16 (-8)
- Democratic People's Alliance 12 (+4)
- Party of Democratic Progress 9 (+2)
- Socialist Party 7 (+2)
- Together for BiH 4
- National Democratic Movement 4 (-1)
- United Srpska (US) 3

== Cabinet ==
House of the Government

The cabinet is composed of the prime minister and the heads of the sixteen ministries. The National Assembly also selects two deputy prime ministers from among the ministers from different constituent peoples (Serbs, Croats, and Bosniaks) on the recommendation of the prime minister.

The law requires that eight ministers be elected from the Serb population, five from the Bosniak population, and three from the Croat population. The prime minister may also appoint one minister from among the "others" population (out of the largest constituent ethnic group).

Under the Law on Ministries adopted in October 2002, the "tasks of the administration" of Republika Srpska are carried out by ministries, republican administrative units, and republican administrative organizations.

Position	Name	Party	Ethnicity
Prime Minister	Radovan Višković	SNSD	Serb
Deputy Prime Minister; Minister for Justice	Anton Kasipović	SNSD	Croat
Deputy Prime Minister; Minister for Spatial Planning, Civil Engineering and Ecology	Srebrenka Golić	SNSD	Bosniak
Minister for Internal Affairs	Dragan Lukač	SNSD	Serb
Minister for Finance	Zora Vidović	SNSD	Serb
Minister for Health and Social Welfare	Alen Šeranić	SNSD	Bosniak
Minister for Education and Culture	Natalija Trivić	United Srpska	Serb
Minister for Labour, Veterans and Disability Protection	Duško Milunović	Socialist	Serb
Minister for Administration and Local Government	Senka Jujić	NPS	Bosniak
Minister for Industry, Energy and Mining	Petar Đokić	Socialist	Serb
Minister for European Integration and International Cooperation	Zlatan Klokić	SNSD	Bosniak
Minister for Family, Youth and Sports	Sonja Davidović	Socialist	Bosniak
Minister for Agriculture, Forestry and Water Management	Boris Pašalić	SNSD	Serb
Minister for Transport and Communications	Nedeljko Ćorić	SNSD	Serb
Minister for the Economy and Entrepreneurship	Vjekoslav Petričević	NDP	Croat
Minister for Trade and Tourism	Suzana Gašić	DEMOS	Croat
Minister for Science and Technology, Higher Education and Informatics	Srđan Rajčević	SNSD	Serb

== Prime Ministers of Republika Srpska ==
- Branko Đerić (22 April 1992 – 20 January 1993) (SDS)
- Vladimir Lukić (20 January 1993 – 18 August 1994) (SDS)
- Dušan Kozić (18 August 1994 – 17 December 1995) (SDS)
- Rajko Kasagić (17 December 1995 – 18 May 1996) (SDS)
- Gojko Kličković (18 May 1996 – 18 January 1998) (SDS)
- Milorad Dodik (18 January 1998 – 12 January 2001) (SNSD) (1st term)
- Mladen Ivanić (12 January 2001 – 17 January 2003) (PDP)
- Dragan Mikerević (17 January 2003 – 17 February 2005) (PDP)
- Pero Bukejlović (17 February 2005 – 28 February 2006) (SDS)
- Milorad Dodik (28 February 2006 – 15 November 2010) (SNSD) (2nd term)
- Anton Kasipović (15 November 2010 – 29 December 2010) (Non-party)
- Aleksandar Džombić (29 December 2010 – 25 February 2013) (SNSD)
- Željka Cvijanović (12 March 2013 – 19 November 2018) (SNSD)
- Radovan Višković (18 December 2018 – 18 August 2025) (SNSD)

== Ministries ==
There are sixteen ministries as follows:

- Ministry for Economy, Energy and Development
- Ministry of Finance
- Ministry of Education and Culture
- Ministry of Justice
- Ministry of Defense
- Ministry of Internal Affairs
- Ministry of Administration and Local Self-Governance
- Ministry of Health and Social Protection
- Ministry of Agriculture, Forestry and Water Resources
- Ministry of Transport and Communications
- Ministry of Trade and Tourism
- Ministry of Urban Planning, Civil Engineering and Ecology
- Ministry of Labor and Soldiers and Invalid Protection
- Ministry of Economic Relations and Coordination
- Ministry of Refugees and Displaced Persons
- Ministry of Science and Technology

== Administrative services ==
Administrative services in RS are administrative bodies within the ministries, and are established for the purpose of performing certain activities from within the sphere of activity of the administration, which, due to their nature, entirety and way of performing, require independence and special organization (administration, inspectorates, and other forms). Administrative services are under the direct supervision of the ministry to which they belong.

The following are the administrative units and the ministries to which they belong:

- Administrative Service for Geodetic and Legal-Property Issues (responsible to the Government of Republika Srpska)
- Administrative Service for the RS Customs (Ministry of Finance)
- Revenue Service (Ministry of Finance)
- Foreign Currency Inspectorate (Ministry of Finance)
- Civil Defense Service (Ministry of Administration and Local Self-Governance)

== Administrative organizations ==
Administrative organizations in the RS are established for the purpose of performing professional duties and duties of the republic's administration (institutions, directorates, secretariats, agencies, commissariats, funds, centers and other forms). Administrative organizations may have the attributes of a legal entity.

== Administrative divisions ==
Republika Sprska operates as a centralised unitary state, in contrast with a federalism-based Federation of Bosnia and Herzegovina. (Note: Unitary: Centralisation:)

== Current situation ==
A proposed secession of Republika Srpska from Bosnia and Herzegovina has remained a consistent topic of conversation in the entity, particularly driven by Milorad Dodik, the long-time President of Republika Srpska who has advocated for a referendum on independence. Meanwhile, Bosniak politicians like Haris Silajdžić, party leader of Party for Bosnia and Herzegovina, have repeatedly stated that he wishes to see the RS dismantled. Miroslav Lajčák, former High Representative of Bosnia-Herzegovina, has responded to this by saying that "Republika Srpska does not have the right to secede from BiH, at the same time no one can unilaterally abolish Republika Srpska."

In 2025, The Court of Bosnia and Herzegovina sentenced Dodik in a first-instance verdict to one year in prison and imposed a six-year ban on him serving the post of president of the country’s Republika Srpska (RS) entity. Dodik was found guilty of non-compliance with the decisions of the High Representative of the international community in the country. His prison sentence was subsequently commuted to a fine but his appeal was rejected.

== Serbia-Republika Srpska relations ==
In 1997, the Agreement on Special Parallel Relations was signed between the two on February 28, 1997. A council has been established to bolster relations, in which presidents and prime ministers participate. The Agreement was implemented December 15, 2010. So far, four councils have been held.

On July 26, 2010, the Serbian Minister of Finance Diana Dragutinović and her Republika Srpska counterpart Aleksandar Džombić signed an Agreement on Cooperation in the Financial Sector, which will further develop mutual relations in the financial system. It will bolster the already good cooperation between the two, and help to maintain special parallel relations and enable exchange of experience, also discussing other sections. The working groups will convene at least twice a year.

=== Kosovo's unilateral proclamation of independence ===
On July 31, 2011, President Milorad Dodik said that the concept of a multi-ethnic state in Kosovo has failed, and that the solving of the Kosovo question has not been dealt with, stressing that Republika Srpska does not accept Kosovo as an independent country. Dodik said "The peaceful solution is evidently not a possible solution [...] We support Belgrade." in relation to the Kosovo Police operation trying to take control of border crossings located in North Kosovo on July 25.
