= List of presidents of Republika Srpska =

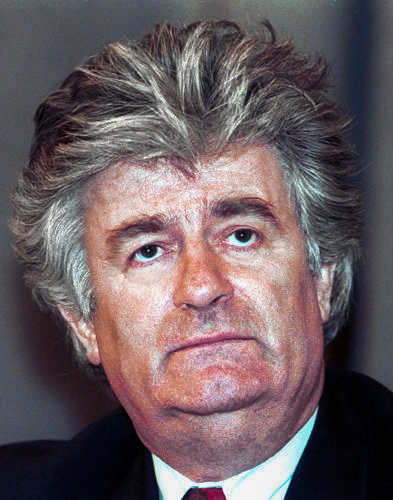
- Top left: Radovan Karadžić, the first president of Republika Srpska.
- Top right: Biljana Plavšić, the first directly elected president and first female leader of any Serb entity.
- Bottom left: Milorad Dodik was the longest-serving president.
- Bottom right: Savo Minić is the incumbent president.

This article lists the presidents of Republika Srpska.

== List of officeholders ==
Serb Democratic Party Serb National Alliance Serbian Radical Party Socialist Party Alliance of Independent Social Democrats

No.	Portrait	Name (Birth–Death)	Term of office	Time in office	Party	Election
1		Radovan Karadžić; Радован Караџић (born 1945)	7 April 1992 – 19 July 1996	4 years, 103 days	Serb Democratic Party	—
2		Biljana Plavšić; Биљана Плавшић (1930–2026)	19 July 1996 – 4 November 1998	2 years, 108 days	Serb Democratic Party (until 1997)	1996
2		Biljana Plavšić; Биљана Плавшић (1930–2026)	19 July 1996 – 4 November 1998	2 years, 108 days	Serb National Alliance (from 1997)	1996
3		Nikola Poplašen; Никола Поплашен (born 1951)	4 November 1998 – 2 September 1999 (Note: Removed by High Representative on 5 March 1999; removal enforced on 2 September 1999.)	302 days	Serbian Radical Party	1998
—		Petar Đokić; Петар Ђокић (born 1961)	2 September 1999 – 26 January 2000	146 days	Socialist Party	Acting
4		Mirko Šarović; Мирко Шаровић (born 1956)	26 January 2000 (Note: Not recognized as President by High Representative until 16 December 2000.) – 28 November 2002	2 years, 306 days	Serb Democratic Party	2000
5		Dragan Čavić; Драган Чавић (born 1958)	28 November 2002 – 9 November 2006	3 years, 346 days	Serb Democratic Party	2002
6		Milan Jelić; Милан Јелић (1956–2007)	9 November 2006 – 30 September 2007†	325 days	Alliance of Independent Social Democrats	2006
—		Igor Radojičić; Игор Радојичић (born 1966)	30 September 2007 – 9 December 2007	70 days	Alliance of Independent Social Democrats	Acting
7		Rajko Kuzmanović; Рајко Кузмановић (born 1931)	9 December 2007 – 15 November 2010	2 years, 341 days	Alliance of Independent Social Democrats	2007
8		Milorad Dodik; Милорад Додик (born 1959)	15 November 2010 – 19 November 2018	8 years, 4 days	Alliance of Independent Social Democrats	2010
8		Milorad Dodik; Милорад Додик (born 1959)	15 November 2010 – 19 November 2018	8 years, 4 days	Alliance of Independent Social Democrats	2014
9		Željka Cvijanović; Жељка Цвијановић (born 1967)	19 November 2018 – 15 November 2022	3 years, 361 days	Alliance of Independent Social Democrats	2018
(8)		Milorad Dodik; Милорад Додик (born 1959)	15 November 2022 – 12 June 2025 (Note: The Central Election Commission ordered Dodik's removal on 6 August 2025. On 18 August, his appeal against the decision of the Central Election Commission was rejected and his mandate as Republika Srpska president was officially terminated. The termination was marked as 12 June 2025, due to the Bosnian state court's verdict becoming legally binding on that day. The National Assembly of Republika Srpska initially rejected the court's decision and supported Dodik as the president, but ultimately accepted the decision two months later.)	2 years, 209 days	Alliance of Independent Social Democrats	2022
—		Ana Trišić-Babić; Ана Тришић-Бабић (born 1967)	18 October 2025 – 17 February 2026	122 days	Alliance of Independent Social Democrats	Acting
10		Siniša Karan; Синиша Каран (born 1962)	17 February 2026 – 16 November 2026	272 days	Alliance of Independent Social Democrats	2025–26
11		Savo Minić; Саво Минић (born 1974)	16 November 2026 – Incumbent	0 days	Alliance of Independent Social Democrats	2026

== Standards ==
Standard of the president of Republika Srpska (1995–2007).

Standard of the president of Republika Srpska since 2007.

== See also ==
- List of vice presidents of Republika Srpska
- List of prime ministers of Republika Srpska
- List of speakers of the National Assembly of Republika Srpska
