= List of political parties in Republika Srpska =

This article is a list of political parties in Republika Srpska, Bosnia and Herzegovina.

Republika Srpska has a multi-party system with numerous political parties, in which no one party often has a chance of gaining power alone, and parties must work with each other to form coalition governments.

== List ==
=== Parties represented in the National Assembly ===
Name	Abbr.	Ideology	Leader	MPs
Alliance of Independent Social Democrats; Савез независних социјалдемократа Savez nezavisnih socijaldemokrata	SNSD	Serbian nationalism Social democracy	Milorad Dodik	34 / 83
Secure Srpska Movement; Покрет Сигурна Српска; Pokret Sigurna Srpska	PSS	National conservatism Pro-Europeanism	Draško Stanivuković	12 / 83
Serb Democratic Party; Српска демократска Странка; Srpska demokratska stranka	SDS	National conservatism Serbian nationalism	Branko Blanuša	10 / 83
People's Party of Srpska–Democratic People's Alliance; Народна партија Српске−Narodna partija Srpske; Демократски народни савез−Demokratski narodni savez	NPS−DNS	Serbian nationalism Conservatism	Darko Banjac−Nenad Nešić	6 / 83
United Srpska; Уједињена Српска; Ujedinjena Srpska	US	National conservatism Serbian nationalism	Nenad Stevandić	5 / 83
Socialist Party–Democratic Union–National Democratic Movement; Социјалистичка Партија–Socijalistička Partija; ДЕМОС–DEMOS; Народни демократски савез–Narodni demokratski pokret	SP-DEMOS-NDP	Social democracy Democratic socialism	Petar Đokić	4 / 83
Socialist party of Srpska; Социјалистичка партија Српске; Socijalistička partija Srpske	SPS	Democratic socialism Social democracy	Goran Selak	4 / 83
For Justice and Order; За Правду и Ред; Za Pravdu i Red	ZPR	National conservatism Anti-corruption	Nebojša Vukanović	4 / 83
Coalition for State; Koalicija za Državu; Коалиција за Државу	KzD	National conservatism Bosniak nationalism	Edin Ramić	3 / 83
Republic Party of Srpska; Републичка странка Српске; Republička stranka Srpske	RSS	Democratic socialism	Slavenko Ristić	1 / 83

=== Defunct and historical parliamentary parties ===
Name	Abbr.	Ideology	Leader	Years	Note
Serb National Alliance; Српски народни савез Srpski narodni savez	SNS	Serbian nationalism Populism	Biljana Plavšić	1997–2004	Abolished in 2004
National Democratic Party; Народна демократска странка Narodna demokratska stranka	NDS	National conservatism	Krsto Jandrić	2003–2013	Merged into the NDP
Democratic Party; Демократска странка Demokratska stranka	DS	Conservatism; Europeanism	Dragan Čavić	2009–2013	Merged into the NDP
Serbian Radical Party RS; Српска радикална странка PC; Srpska radikalna stranka RS	SRS RS	Serbian nationalism National conservatism	Nikola Poplašen	1996–2018	Merged with PDP
Serbian Radical Party "9th January"; Српска радикална странка „9. јануар” Srpska radikalna stranka „9. januar”	SRS 9J	Serbian nationalism National conservatism	Mirko Blagojević	2004–2018	Merged with SNS
