= Independent Democratic Group =

Independent Democratic Group Независни демократски српски клуб Nezavisni demokratski klub
- Chamber: National Assembly
- Legislature(s): 10th
- Foundation: 30 November 2018
- Member parties: DEMOS
- President: Spomenka Stevanović
- Representation: 4 / 83
- Ideology: Serbian nationalism National conservatism

The Independent Democratic Group, (Serbo-Croatian: Слободни демократски српски клуб/Nezavisni demokratski klub or NDK) is a parliamentary group in the National Assembly of Republika Srpska.

The group was formed on 30 November 2018, following the expulsion of several prominent members of the DNS.

Former vice-president of the party and President of the National Assembly, Nedeljko Čubrilović, quit the DNS after the 2018 Republika Srpska general elections. The defection was the culmination of long-term disputes with the party leadership, with Čubrilović claiming that party president Marko Pavić was intending to end the party's alliance with the governing SNSD and "move to the opposition".

Such resignations came in extraordinary fashion, with Čubrilović calling DNS deputies "faggots, junkies and criminals". It was announced shortly thereafter that the rebel deputies would form their own party, the Democratic Union (abbreviated as DEMOS), with Čubrilović as its first president. Despite this, the NDK continues to serve as the parliamentary group for the DEMOS members, even though the NDK members are able to form a parliamentary group bearing the new party's name.

== Members ==
Name	Party	Positions
Spomenka Stevanović	DEMOS	President
Spomenko Stojanović	DEMOS	
Nedeljko Čubrilović	DEMOS	
Milan Dakić	DEMOS	
