= List of defunct political parties of Bosnia and Herzegovina =

This is a list of defunct political parties of Bosnia and Herzegovina.

- National Alliance for Free Peace or People's Alliance for Free Peace (Narodni savez za slobodan mir, NSSM): the party contested the 1996 parliamentary elections, but only in Republika Srpska. It finished third in Republika Srpska with 5.7% of the vote, winning two seats in the national House of Representatives. In the elections for the National Assembly of Republika Srpska, it won ten of the 83 seats. The party did not contest any further elections.
- The Alliance of National Rebirth or League of People's Rebirth (Савез Народног Препорода, Savez Narodnog Preporoda) was a conservative party led by Mirko Banjac, established in 2002, and merged into the Democratic People's Alliance in the fall of 2003. At its last legislative elections, 5 October 2002, the party won no seats in the House of Representatives of Bosnia and Herzegovina, but it won 1 out of 83 in the National Assembly of the Republic of Srpska.

== See also ==
- List of political parties in Bosnia and Herzegovina
