= Free Democratic Serb Group =

Free Democratic Serb Group Слободни демократски српски клуб Slobodni demokratski srpski klub
- Chamber: National Assembly
- Legislature(s): 9th
- Foundation: 1 July 2015
- Member parties: DNS; Independents
- President: Darko Banjac
- Representation: 4 / 83
- Ideology: Non-partisan

The Free Democratic Serb Group, (Serbo-Croatian: Слободни демократски српски клуб/Slobodni demokratski srpski klub) is a parliamentary group in the National Assembly of Republika Srpska.

Formed in mid-2015 by deputies formerly affiliated to a number of different parties, it currently comprises three independent and one DNS deputy. It functions as a technical group of various deputies who are permitted to "be members of different political parties", whilst maintaining a "common political line".

== Members ==
Name	Party	Former party	Positions
Darko Banjac	DNS		President
Nenad Stevandić	Independent	SDS	
Slavko Dunjić	Independent	SDS	
Duško Ivić	Independent	DNS	
