= 2026 Republika Srpska general election =

Bosnian subnational election

- 4 October 2026
- Presidential election
- Turnout: 47.89% (▲12.12 pp)

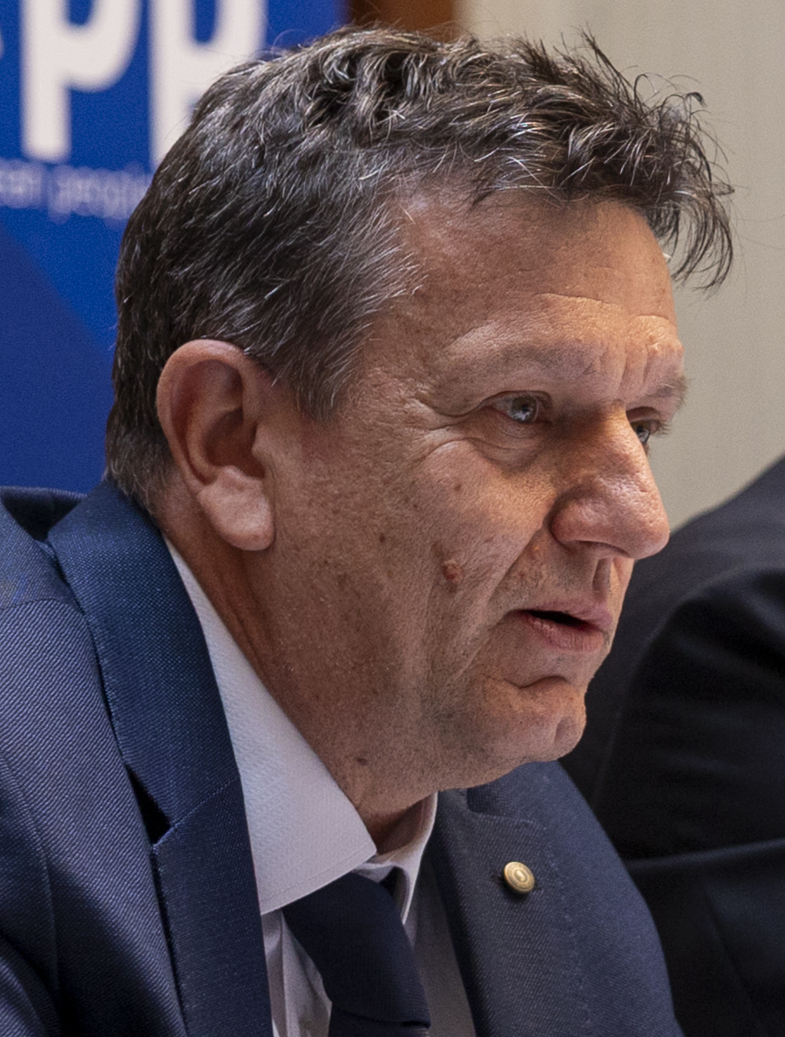
Candidate	Savo Minić	Branko Blanuša
Party	SNSD	SDS
Popular vote	301,532	237,071
Percentage	52.10%	40.97%
President before election
Siniša Karan
SNSD
Elected President
Savo Minić
SNSD
- National Assembly election
- 83 seats in the National Assembly; 42 seats needed for a majority
- Turnout: 47.88% (▼5.88 pp)
Party	Leader	Vote %	Seats	+/–
SNSD	Milorad Dodik	38.88	34	+5
PSS	Draško Stanivuković	13.82	12	New
SDS	Branko Blanuša	11.98	10	−3
DNS–NPS	Nenad Nešić	5.60	5	−2
SP–DEMOS–NDP	Petar Đokić	5.53	5	−5
US	Nenad Stevandić	5.20	5	+1
SPS	Goran Selak	4.61	4	+1
ZPR	Nebojša Vukanović	4.50	4	0
KzD	Edin Ramić	3.33	3	−2
RSS	Slavenko Ristić	1.65	1	+1
This lists parties that won seats. See the complete results below.
Prime Minister before	Prime Minister after
Savo Minić; SNSD	Anđelka Kuzmić (acting); SNSD

General elections were held in Republika Srpska on 4 October 2026 as part of the Bosnian general elections. Voters decided the President of Republika Srpska, the two Vice-Presidents of Republika Srpska, and the 83 members of the National Assembly of Republika Srpska.

Incumbent president Siniša Karan of the SNSD, though eligible, did not run for a second full term.

== Electoral system ==
In Republika Srpska, the President and two Vice-Presidents are elected on a single ballot. The candidate who receives the overall highest number of votes is elected President (typically a Serb, who form the majority of the population). To ensure multi-ethnic representation, the two Vice-President positions are awarded to the highest vote-getters from the remaining two constituent groups (Bosniak and Croat).

== Presidential candidates ==
Full list of candidates for position of president and two vice presidents was published on 18 August 2026 in Official Gazette:

Candidate	Affiliation	National group	Background	Reference
Ramiz Salkić	Party of Democratic Action	Bosniak	Bosniak Vice President of Republika Srpska (2014–2022)	
Ivan Begić	Social Democratic Party	Croat	Journalist	
Branko Blanuša	Serb Democratic Party	Serb	Professor at the University of Banja Luka	
Ćamil Duraković	Independent	Bosniak	Bosniak Vice President of Republika Srpska	
Franjo Jukić	Croatian Democratic Union	Croat	Clerk	
Savo Minić	Alliance of Independent Social Democrats	Serb	Prime Minister of Republika Srpska	
Bogdan Jovanović	Party of life	Serb		
Igor Balukčić	Croatian Democratic Union 1990	Croat	Vice President of Town council of Teslić	
Begija Smajić	Party for Bosnia and Herzegovina	Bosniak	Member of Town council of Srebrenica	
Jusuf Arifagić	People and Justice	Bosniak	Businessman	
Marko Jorgić	Independent	Croat		
Ivo Kamenjašević	Croatian Peasant Party	Croat		

== Opinion polling ==
=== National Assembly ===
Ahead of the 2026 general elections, several opinion polls measured support for political parties in the National Assembly of Republika Srpska election. The table presents the published polls' results, fieldwork details, and deviations from the official election results.

Polling firm	Publishing date	Sample size	SNSD	PSS	SDS	ZPR	PD	NF	Other lists	Average error
Metrix	01 Oct	1.500	36.0	12.0	15.5	7.0	5.5	3.0	21.0	2.6
Faktor Plus	17 Jun	1.200	40.8	19.8	12.1	5.0	3.2	6.0	13.1	3.5
Tanjug Srpske	28 Sep	/	27.1	20.7	14.3	9.3	4.9	4.1	19.6	5.0
Nacija TV	30 Sep	1.247	38.8	17.4	20.1	9.4	5.2	1.9	7.2	5.3
Ipsos	16 Jun	1.008	36.9	23.8	21.4	3.6	2.4	1.2	10.7	5.5
Geostrategy	10 Sep	850	28.3	23.7	18.5	9.5	5.0	/	15.0	7.3

== Results ==
=== President ===
Candidate	Party	Votes	%
Savo Minić	Alliance of Independent Social Democrats	301,532	52.10
Branko Blanuša	Serb Democratic Party	237,071	40.97
Ramiz Salkić	Party of Democratic Action	12,213	2.11
Ćamil Duraković	Independent	7,893	1.36
Bogdan Jovanović	Party of Life	4,520	0.78
Igor Balukčić	Croatian Democratic Union 1990	3,547	0.61
Jusuf Arifagić	People and Justice	3,403	0.59
Ivan Begić	Social Democratic Party	2,909	0.50
Marko Jorgić	Independent	1,973	0.34
Franjo Jukić	Croatian Democratic Union	1,441	0.25
Begija Smajić	Party for Bosnia and Herzegovina	1,358	0.23
Ivo Kamenjašević	Croatian Peasant Party	849	0.15
Total		578,709	100.00
Valid votes		578,709	95.52
Invalid votes		6,939	1.15
Blank votes		20,193	3.33
Total votes		605,841	100.00
Registered voters/turnout		1,265,080	47.89
Source: CEC

=== National Assembly ===
Party	Votes	%	Seats			
Party	Votes	%	Direct	Comp.	Total	+/−
Alliance of Independent Social Democrats	214,609	38.88	27	7	34	+5
Safe Srpska Movement	76,311	13.82	9	3	12	New
Serb Democratic Party	66,104	11.98	9	1	10	-3
Democratic People's Alliance–People's Party of Srpska	30,910	5.60	3	2	5	-2
Socialist Party–Democratic Union–National Democratic Movement	30,549	5.53	4	1	5	-5
United Srpska	28,726	5.20	3	2	5	+1
Socialist Party of Srpska	25,446	4.61	2	2	4	+1
For Justice and Order	24,862	4.50	2	2	4	0
Coalition for the State	18,370	3.33	3	0	3	-2
People's Front	11,964	2.17	0	0	0	New
Republican Party of Srpska	9,088	1.65	1	0	1	New
Will of the People of Srpska	7,033	1.27	0	0	0	New
Party for Bosnia and Herzegovina	2,621	0.47	0	0	0	0
People and Justice	2,374	0.43	0	0	0	New
Croatian Democratic Union and allies (Note: HDZ–HSSSR–HSS–HSP–HKDU–HSPAS–HDU–HSPHB–HRAST–HNL)	1,303	0.24	0	0	0	0
Life Party	1,064	0.19	0	0	0	New
Republicans of Bosnia and Herzegovina	381	0.07	0	0	0	New
Croatian Peasant Party	269	0.05	0	0	0	0
Total	551,984	100.00	63	20	83	0
Valid votes	551,984	91.13				
Invalid votes	42,294	6.98				
Blank votes	11,402	1.88				
Total votes	605,680	100.00				
Registered voters/turnout	1,265,080	47.88				
Source: CEC

== See also ==
- 2026 Bosnian general election
- 2026 Federation of Bosnia and Herzegovina general election
