= United Srpska =

Bosnian Serb political party

United Srpska Уједињена Српска Ujedinjena Srpska
- Abbreviation: US
- President: Nenad Stevandić
- Founder: Nenad Stevandić
- Founded: December 2015; 10 years ago
- Split from: Serb Democratic Party
- Preceded by: Free Democratic Serb Group
- Headquarters: Jovana Dučića 25, Banja Luka
- Ideology: Serbian nationalism; Ultranationalism; National conservatism; Euroscepticism
- Political position: Right-wing to far-right
- HoR BiH: 1 / 42
- HoP BiH: 0 / 15
- NA RS: 6 / 83

Website
- www.ujedinjenasrpska.rs

United Srpska (US; Serbian: Уједињена Српска, romanized: Ujedinjena Srpska) is a political party based in Republika Srpska, Bosnia and Herzegovina. A Serb nationalist party, United Srpska was formed in December 2015 following a split from the Serb Democratic Party.

== History ==
United Srpska president, Nenad Stevandić, formed the party after criticising the Serb Democratic Party for a perceived lack of sufficient nationalism, stating that its representatives on a national level have aimed to "destroy Republika Srpska". During the 9th convocation of the National Assembly of Republika Srpska, Stevandić was a part of the Free Democratic Serb Group, which comprised other right-wing SDS dissidents.

At the 2018 general election, US gained representation within the National Assembly in its own right for the first time. With 3.09% of the vote, the party had four deputies elected. In November 2018, it was announced that US would participate in the governing coalition, alongside SNSD, DNS, SP and NDP.

Natalija Trivić became the party's first minister appointed to the Government of Republika Srpska, serving as Minister for Education and Culture since December 2018.

== List of presidents ==
#	Name (Born–Died)	Portrait	Term of office	
1	Nenad Stevandić (b. 1966)		December 2015	present

== Election results ==
=== Parliamentary Assembly of Bosnia and Herzegovina ===
Parliamentary Assembly of Bosnia and Herzegovina
Year	Leader	#	Popular vote	%	HoR	Seat change	HoP	Seat change	Government
2018	Nenad Stevandić	Did not enter			0 / 42	New	0 / 15	New	Extra-parliamentary
2022	Nenad Stevandić	17th	24,687	1.55	1 / 42	▲1	0 / 15	0	Support
2026	Nenad Stevandić	16th	23,747	1.75	1 / 42	0	0 / 15	0	TBD

=== National Assembly of Republika Srpska ===
National Assembly of Republika Srpska
Year	Leader	#	Popular vote	%	# of seats	Seat change	Coalition	Government
2018	Nenad Stevandić	8th	21,187	3.09	3 / 83	New	—	Coalition
2022	Nenad Stevandić	7th	32,700	5.11	4 / 83	▲1	—	Coalition
2026	Nenad Stevandić	6th	27,615	5.25	5 / 83	▲1	—	Coalition

== Positions held ==
Major positions held by United Srpska members:

Speaker of the National Assembly of Republika Srpska	Years
Nenad Stevandić	2022–
