= 2018 Republika Srpska general election =

Election for president and National Assembly

| ← 2014 | 7 October 2018 | 2022 → |
- Presidential election
- Turnout: 57.69%
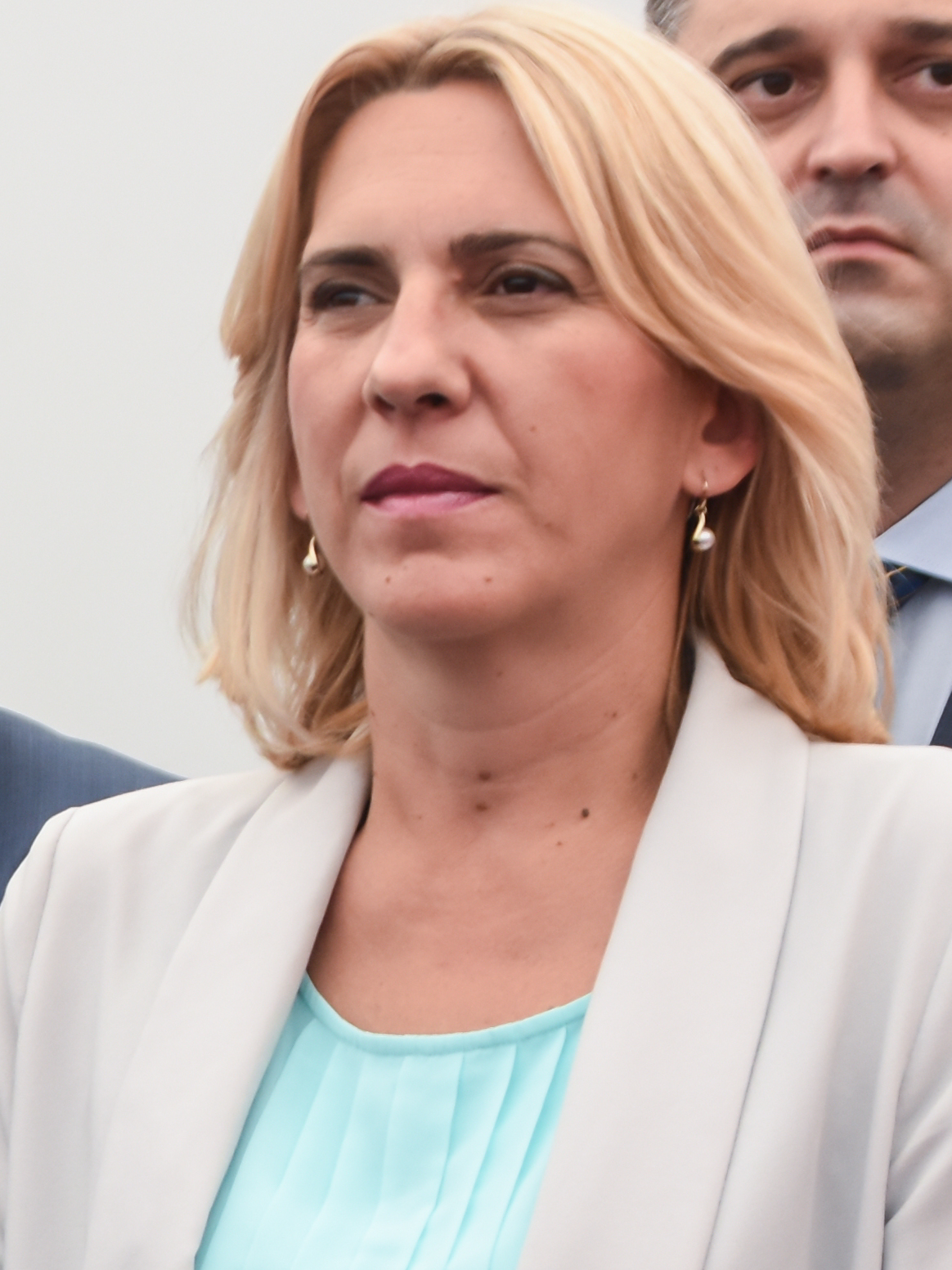
| Candidate | Željka Cvijanović | Vukota Govedarica |
| Party | SNSD | SDS |
| Popular vote | 319,699 | 284,159 |
| Percentage | 47.04% | 41.82% |
- Results by municipality
President before election
Milorad Dodik
SNSD
Elected President
Željka Cvijanović
SNSD
- National Assembly election
- All 83 seats in the National Assembly; 42 seats needed for a majority
- Turnout: 57.71%
| Party | Leader | Vote % | Seats | +/– |
|---|---|---|---|---|
| SNSD | Milorad Dodik | 31.87 | 28 | −1 |
| SDS–SRS RS–SRS | Vukota Govedarica | 18.04 | 16 | −8 |
| DNS | Marko Pavić | 14.44 | 12 | +4 |
| PDP | Mladen Ivanić | 10.22 | 9 | +2 |
| SP | Petar Đokić | 8.19 | 7 | +2 |
| Together for BiH | Edin Ramić | 4.32 | 4 | +1 |
| NDP–NS–SNS–Freedom | Dragan Čavić | 4.12 | 4 | −1 |
| US | Nenad Stevandić | 3.09 | 3 | New |
This lists parties that won seats. See the complete results below.
Results by constituency
| Prime Minister before | Prime Minister after |
|---|---|
| Željka Cvijanović; SNSD | Radovan Višković; SNSD |

General elections were held in Republika Srpska on 7 October 2018 as part of the Bosnian general elections. Voters elected the President of Republika Srpska and all 83 members of the National Assembly of Republika Srpska. Incumbent President Milorad Dodik was ineligible to run for another term.

Incumbent Prime Minister Željka Cvijanović was nominated by the Alliance of Independent Social Democrats (SNSD) and was elected President, running on a joint platform with the Democratic People's Alliance and Socialist Party. The SNSD also remained the largest in the National Assembly, and Radovan Višković became Prime Minister after a brief interim.

== Results ==
=== President ===
| Candidate | Party | Votes | % |
|---|---|---|---|
| Željka Cvijanović | Alliance of Independent Social Democrats | 319,699 | 47.04 |
| Vukota Govedarica | Alliance for Victory (SDS–PDP–NDP–SRS RS–SRS–NS–SNS) | 284,195 | 41.82 |
| Ramiz Salkić | Together for BiH (SDA–SZBiH–BPS) | 21,292 | 3.13 |
| Ćamil Duraković | Independent | 10,299 | 1.52 |
| Radomir Lukić | First Serb Democratic Party | 6,021 | 0.89 |
| Josip Jerković | HDZ–HSS–HKDU–HSP HNS | 5,881 | 0.87 |
| Darko Matijašević | Serb Progressive Party | 4,346 | 0.64 |
| Duško Košpić | Independent | 3,273 | 0.48 |
| Sadik Ahmetović | Independent Bloc | 3,221 | 0.47 |
| Jusuf Arifagić | Independent Bosnian-Herzegovinian List | 2,550 | 0.38 |
| Jozo Barišić | Croatian Party BiH | 2,379 | 0.35 |
| Admir Čavka | Union for a Better Future of BiH | 1,941 | 0.29 |
| Slavko Sekulić | Independent | 1,120 | 0.16 |
| Gordana Kršić | Independent | 1,111 | 0.16 |
| Darko Miletić | Independent | 1,109 | 0.16 |
| Vojin Pavlović | Independent | 1,021 | 0.15 |
| Željka Mićić | Independent | 1,012 | 0.15 |
| Slobodan Pavlović | Independent | 887 | 0.13 |
| Aleksandar Đorić | Independent | 818 | 0.12 |
| Igor Matić | Independent | 761 | 0.11 |
| Igor Gašević | Independent | 733 | 0.11 |
| Slavko Dragičević | Independent | 659 | 0.10 |
| Živko Kondić | Democratic Party of the Disabled | 576 | 0.08 |
| Darko Glišić | Social Democratic Union | 555 | 0.08 |
| Jovan Stevanović | Independent | 525 | 0.08 |
| Petar Radić | Independent | 464 | 0.07 |
| Igor Jovanović | Independent | 405 | 0.06 |
| Dragica Josipović | Independent | 377 | 0.06 |
| Dejan Pejić | Liberal Party | 349 | 0.05 |
| Burim Dećaj | Independent | 332 | 0.05 |
| Muhamed Viteškić | Independent | 322 | 0.05 |
| Nedžad Delić | Democratic Party of the Disabled | 320 | 0.05 |
| Ivan Brelak | NS | 244 | 0.04 |
| Obrad Lalić | Independent | 240 | 0.04 |
| Dragomir Pandurević | Independent | 230 | 0.03 |
| Nikolina Tomšić | Union for the Old Town Stari Grad | 220 | 0.03 |
| Anđelko Menjić | Independent | 114 | 0.02 |
| Total | | 679,601 | 100.00 |
| Valid votes | | 679,601 | 93.37 |
| Invalid/blank votes | | 48,279 | 6.63 |
| Total votes | | 727,880 | 100.00 |
| Registered voters/turnout | | 1,261,645 | 57.69 |
Source: CEC

=== National Assembly ===
| Party | Votes | % | Seats | | | |
| Party | Votes | % | Direct | Comp. | Total | +/– |
|---|---|---|---|---|---|---|
| Alliance of Independent Social Democrats | 218,201 | 31.87 | 24 | 4 | 28 | –1 |
| SDS–SRS RS–SRS | 123,515 | 18.04 | 13 | 3 | 16 | –8 |
| Democratic People's Alliance | 98,851 | 14.44 | 11 | 1 | 12 | +4 |
| Party of Democratic Progress | 69,948 | 10.22 | 5 | 4 | 9 | +2 |
| Socialist Party | 56,106 | 8.19 | 6 | 1 | 7 | +2 |
| Together for BiH (SDA–SBiH–BPS) | 29,556 | 4.32 | 2 | 2 | 4 | +1 |
| NDP–NS–SNS–Freedom | 28,183 | 4.12 | 1 | 3 | 4 | –1 |
| United Srpska | 21,187 | 3.09 | 1 | 2 | 3 | New |
| Pro-European Bloc | 11,157 | 1.63 | 0 | 0 | 0 | New |
| Successful Srpska Movement | 6,330 | 0.92 | 0 | 0 | 0 | New |
| First Serb Democratic Party | 6,288 | 0.92 | 0 | 0 | 0 | New |
| Serb Progressive Party | 3,595 | 0.53 | 0 | 0 | 0 | 0 |
| HDZ–HSS–HKDU–HSP HNS | 2,083 | 0.30 | 0 | 0 | 0 | 0 |
| Union for New Politics | 1,612 | 0.24 | 0 | 0 | 0 | New |
| Movement of Democratic Action | 1,547 | 0.23 | 0 | 0 | 0 | New |
| Savez Ostanak | 1,420 | 0.21 | 0 | 0 | 0 | New |
| Independent Bosnian-Herzegovinian List | 1,114 | 0.16 | 0 | 0 | 0 | New |
| Communist Party | 1,089 | 0.16 | 0 | 0 | 0 | 0 |
| Ecological Party | 651 | 0.10 | 0 | 0 | 0 | New |
| Croatian Democratic Union 1990 | 523 | 0.08 | 0 | 0 | 0 | 0 |
| First Party | 463 | 0.07 | 0 | 0 | 0 | 0 |
| Bosnian Party | 363 | 0.05 | 0 | 0 | 0 | 0 |
| Youth Power Union | 301 | 0.04 | 0 | 0 | 0 | New |
| Zavičajni Socijaldemokrati | 299 | 0.04 | 0 | 0 | 0 | New |
| Union for Democratic Srpska | 231 | 0.03 | 0 | 0 | 0 | New |
| Civic Alliance | 46 | 0.01 | 0 | 0 | 0 | New |
| The Left Wing | 7 | 0.00 | 0 | 0 | 0 | New |
| Independents | 78 | 0.01 | 0 | 0 | 0 | 0 |
| Total | 684,744 | 100.00 | 63 | 20 | 83 | 0 |
| Valid votes | 684,744 | 94.08 | | | | |
| Invalid/blank votes | 43,085 | 5.92 | | | | |
| Total votes | 727,829 | 100.00 | | | | |
| Registered voters/turnout | 1,261,245 | 57.71 | | | | |
Source: CEC

== Polling ==
A May 2018 poll by IPSOS asked the question, "In your opinion, how would a united opposition govern RS, compared to the current governing coalition led by SNSD? As you know, Milorad Dodik cannot seek a third term as RS president, so RS will elect a new president this year. Do you believe that this will lead to positive change in RS, do you think it will have negative results, or do you think that it will make no real difference to RS?" 41% believed things would be about the same, 18% somewhat better, 13% somewhat worse, 9% much better, 7% much worse and 13% did not answer the question.

== See also ==
- 2018 Bosnian general election
- 2018 Federation of Bosnia and Herzegovina general election
