= Narodna Skupština =

Narodna Skupština means "National Assembly", also "National Parliament" in Serbian. It may refer to:

- Narodna Skupština Republike Srbije, the National Assembly of Serbia
- Narodna Skupština Republike Srpske, the National Assembly of the Republic of Srpska (Bosnia and Herzegovina)
- Narodna Skupština, the National Assembly of Revolutionary Serbia
