= 2022 Republika Srpska general election =

Subnational election in Bosnia and Herzegovina

- 2 October 2022
- Presidential election
- Turnout: 54.93% (▼2.76 pp)
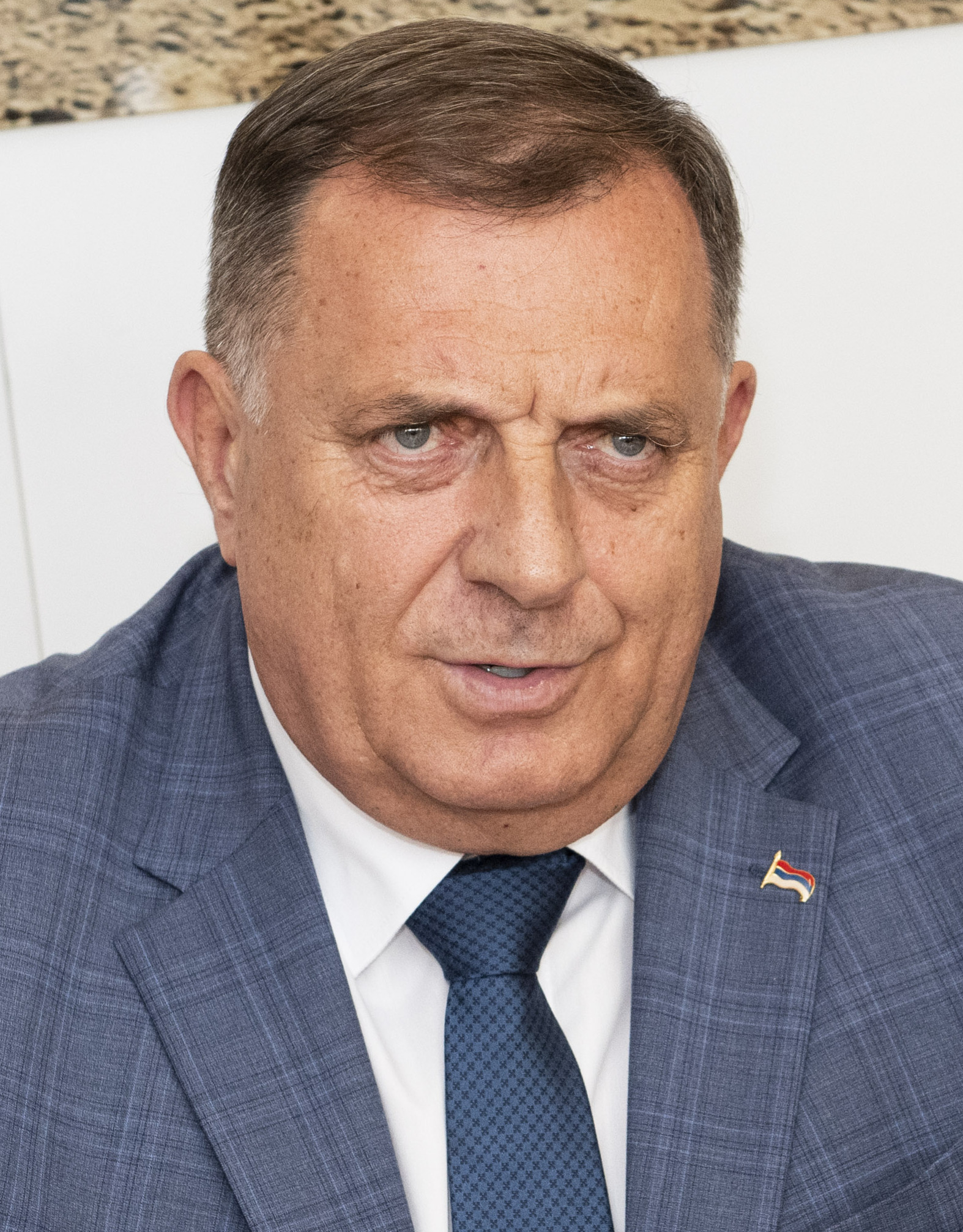

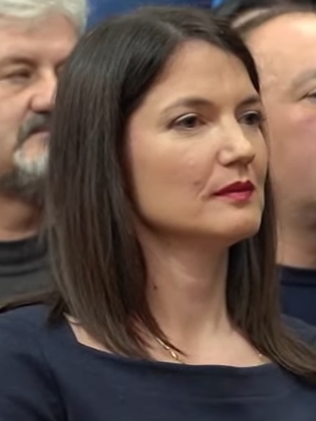
Candidate	Milorad Dodik	Jelena Trivić
Party	SNSD	PDP
Alliance		PDP-SDS
Popular vote	300,180	273,245
Percentage	47.06%	42.84%
- Results by municipality. Dodik: 40–50% 50–60% 60–70% 70–80% Trivić: 40–50% 50–60% 60–70% 70–80%
President before election
Željka Cvijanović
SNSD
Elected President
Milorad Dodik
SNSD
- National Assembly election
- 83 seats in the National Assembly; 42 seats needed for a majority
- Turnout: 53.76% (▼3.95 pp)
Party	Leader	Vote %	Seats	+/–
SNSD	Milorad Dodik	34.63	29	+1
SDS	Mirko Šarović	14.95	13	−3
PDP	Branislav Borenović	10.30	8	−1
SP–NDP	Petar Đokić	5.93	5	−2
PzD	Ramiz Salkić	5.73	5	+1
DEMOS	Nedeljko Čubrilović	5.46	5	New
US	Nenad Stevandić	5.11	4	+1
ZPR	Nebojša Vukanović	4.93	4	New
DNS	Nenad Nešić	4.46	4	−8
NPS	Darko Banjac	3.27	3	New
SPS	Goran Selak	3.11	3	New
This lists parties that won seats. See the complete results below.
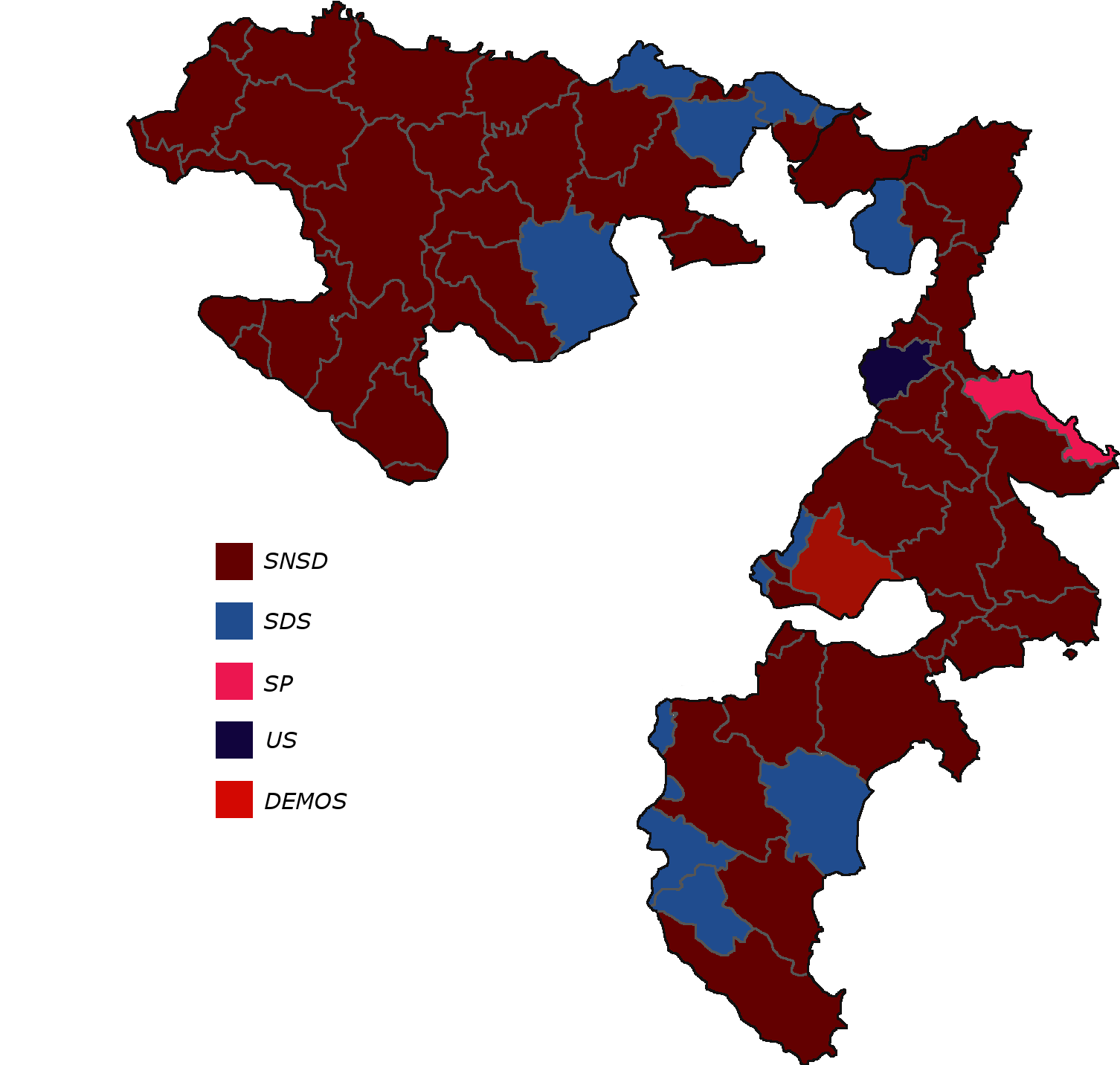
Colours denote the party with the most votes by municipalities.
Prime Minister before	Prime Minister after
Radovan Višković; SNSD	Radovan Višković; SNSD

General elections were held in Republika Srpska on 2 October 2022 as part of the Bosnian general elections. Voters decided the President of Republika Srpska and the 83 members of the National Assembly of Republika Srpska.

Incumbent president Željka Cvijanović was eligible to run for a second four-year term, but opted not to do so, instead deciding to run for Serb member of the Presidency of Bosnia and Herzegovina. Instead of Cvijanović, former president and incumbent Serb member of the Bosnian Presidency Milorad Dodik decided to run for president once again.

== Results ==
=== President ===
Partial results with 2,239 out of the 2,239 (100.00%) polling stations counted are shown below. On 10 October, the Central Election Commission ordered a recount of all ballots cast after reports of fraud.

Candidate	Party	Votes	%
Milorad Dodik	Alliance of Independent Social Democrats	300,180	47.09
Jelena Trivić	Party of Democratic Progress	273,245	42.86
Ćamil Duraković	Independent	13,760	2.16
Senad Bratić	SDA–State Movement (Note: SBiH–SDA–SDP–SBB–DF–GS–PDA–SD BiH–NES–BHZ)	13,680	2.15
Jusuf Arifagić	For the state of BiH	10,467	1.64
Radislav Jovičević	Democratic People's Alliance	5,613	0.88
Dejan Pejić	Liberal Party	2,168	0.34
Neđo Đurić	Socialist Party of Srpska	2,092	0.33
Davor Pranjić	Croatian Democratic Union and allies (Note: HDZ–HSP–HKDU–HSP HSP-AS HSP–HB, HRAST, HDU)	1,966	0.31
Ivan Begić	Independent	1,854	0.29
Zoran Kalinić	Our Story Republika Srpska	1,252	0.20
Ilić Miroslav	Independent	1,247	0.20
Vladimir Bijelić	Independent	1,185	0.19
Ivanović Dalibor	Independent	1,094	0.17
Milivojević Cvijetin	Independent	801	0.13
Slavko Dragičević	Independent	755	0.12
Goran Milošević	Independent	691	0.11
Sekulić Slavko	Independent	613	0.10
Ana Dobrilović	Independent	547	0.09
Milan Anđelić	Independent	508	0.08
Jelenko Bubić	Independent	500	0.08
Dušan Dragičević	Independent	494	0.08
Amir Reko	Ecological Party of Republika Srpska	437	0.07
Ljubiša Aladžić	Serbian Progressive Party	404	0.06
Alen Popović	New Age	372	0.06
Duško Đurđević	Independent	336	0.05
Miljan Smiljanić	Independent	311	0.05
Nikola Suvajac	People's Party	258	0.04
Igor Gašević	Independent	250	0.04
Davor Despot	Independent	229	0.04
Gazmend Dečaj	Independent	209	0.03
Total		637,518	100.00
Valid votes		637,823	92.21
Invalid votes		38,939	5.63
Blank votes		14,981	2.17
Total votes		691,743	100.00
Registered voters/turnout		1,259,322	54.93
Source: CEC

=== National Assembly ===
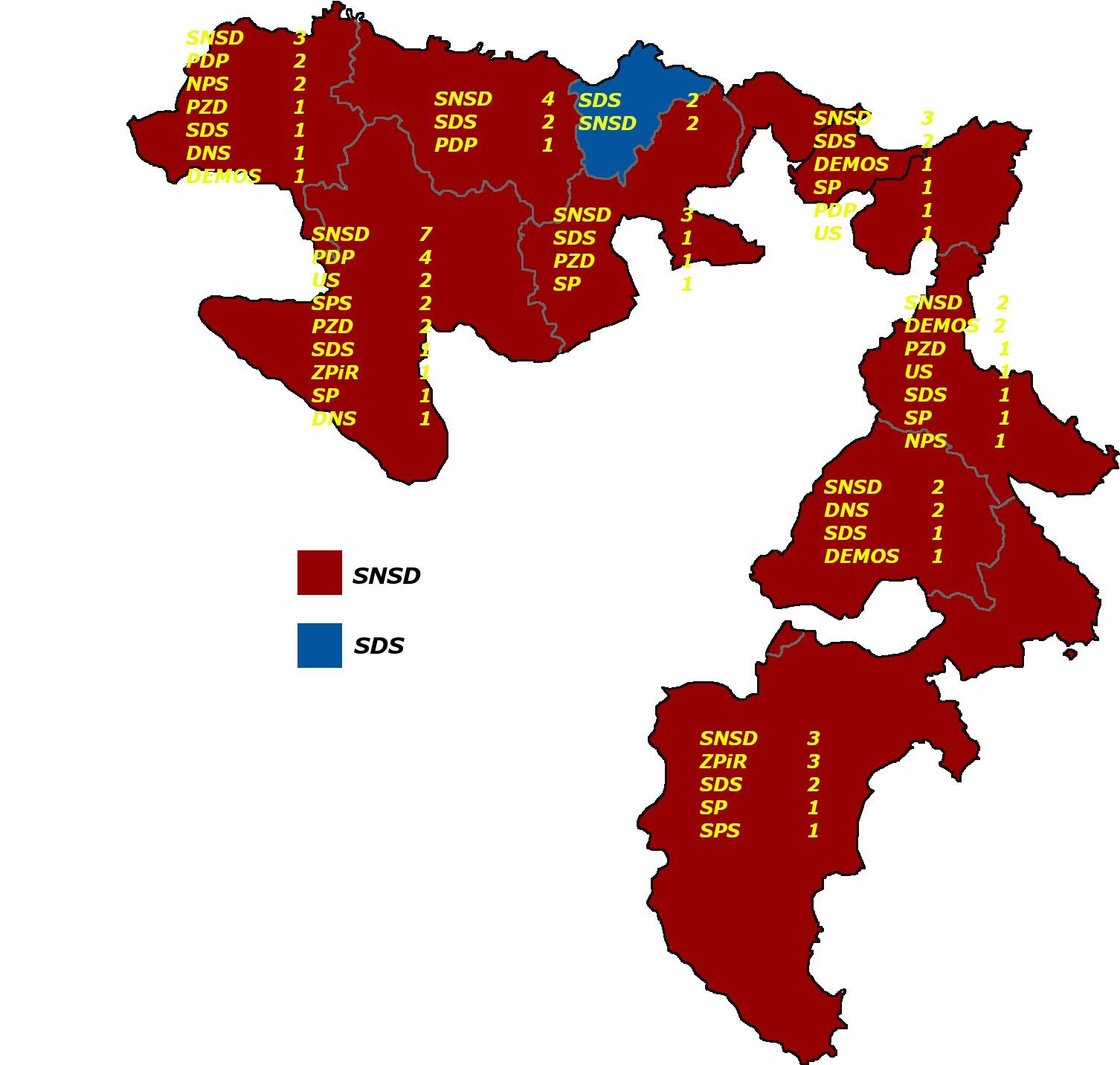
Distribution of mandates for the National Assembly

For the National Assembly, 63 seats are allocated to each of the nine electoral units and a further 20 "compensation seats" are allocated to ensure proportionality.

Party	Votes	%	Seats			
Party	Votes	%	Direct	Comp.	Total	+/–
Alliance of Independent Social Democrats	221,554	34.63	27	2	29	+1
Serb Democratic Party	95,648	14.95	13	0	13	-3
Party of Democratic Progress	65,872	10.30	6	2	8	−1
Socialist Party	37,919	5.93	5	0	5	−2
State Movement (Note: SDA–SBiH–SDP–SBB–DF–GS–PDA–BHZ–SD–NES)	36,651	5.73	3	2	5	New
Democratic Union	34,898	5.46	3	2	5	New
United Srpska	32,700	5.11	3	1	4	+1
For Justice and Order	31,558	4.93	2	2	4	New
Democratic People's Alliance	28,502	4.46	0	4	4	−8
People's Party of Srpska	20,905	3.27	1	2	3	New
Socialist Party of Srpska	19,894	3.11	0	3	3	New
For the state of BiH	4,321	0.68	0	0	0	New
Potkozara People's Movement	2,825	0.44	0	0	0	New
Party of Life	866	0.14	0	0	0	New
Croatian Democratic Union and allies (Note: HDZ–HSP–HKDU–HSP–HSS–HSPAS–HDU–HRAST–HNP)	852	0.13	0	0	0	0
Our Story Republika Srpska	783	0.12	0	0	0	New
Democratic Centre of Republika Srpska	746	0.12	0	0	0	New
Bosnian Party	451	0.07	0	0	0	New
Alliance for Democratic Srpska	431	0.07	0	0	0	New
United Pensioner Party	400	0.06	0	0	0	New
Peasant party	309	0.05	0	0	0	New
Advanced Srpska Party	305	0.05	0	0	0	New
Union for New Politics	272	0.04	0	0	0	0
Free Party of Srpska	177	0.03	0	0	0	New
Ecological Party of Republika Srpska	172	0.03	0	0	0	0
Worker Party	170	0.03	0	0	0	New
Native Social Democrats	153	0.02	0	0	0	New
Patriotic Party	97	0.02	0	0	0	New
The New Age	97	0.02	0	0	0	New
Republican Party of Srpska	88	0.01	0	0	0	New
Party of Democratic Activity	77	0.01	0	0	0	New
Total	639,693	100.00	63	20	83	0
Valid votes	639,693	94.48				
Invalid votes	22,206	3.28				
Blank votes	15,137	2.24				
Total votes	677,036	100.00				
Registered voters/turnout	1,259,322	53.76				
Source: CEC

== Aftermath ==
=== Allegations of voter fraud ===
Following the release of the preliminary results, opposition parties filed accusations of electoral fraud direct against Milorad Dodik who they claimed coordinated stuffing ballot boxes with thousands of illegal votes to put the Alliance of Independent Social Democrats ahead in the polls and that Jelena Trivić was the true winner of the presidential election. As a result of the allegations, the central electoral commission conducted a recount of the preliminary results for the Republika Srpska alongside the rest of the country's elections. On 22 October, it confirmed the presidential and parliamentary results. On 27 October, officials confirmed Dodik's victory. The commission noted that while there were irregularities, none were on a level that would have changed the outcome of the election.

=== Government formation ===
On 23 November 2022, President Dodik stated that he had given the mandate to form a government to the incumbent Prime Minister Radovan Višković and expects him to be elected in the first week of December 2022 with the support of 53 members of parliament. Eventually on 21 December 2022, the assembly elected a new government headed by Višković with the support of 51 among the 74 assembly members being present. The ministries were distributed according to party strength, with 10 being allocated to the SNSD, two to the SP and one portfolio each for DEMOS, the Greens, the People's Party of Srpska, and US.

== See also ==
- 2022 Bosnian general election
- 2022 Federation of Bosnia and Herzegovina general election
