= List of speakers of the National Assembly of Republika Srpska =

Speaker of the National Assembly of Republika Srpska
- Предсједник Народне скупштине Републике Српске; Predsjednik Narodne skupštine Republike Srpske
- Seal of Republika Srpska

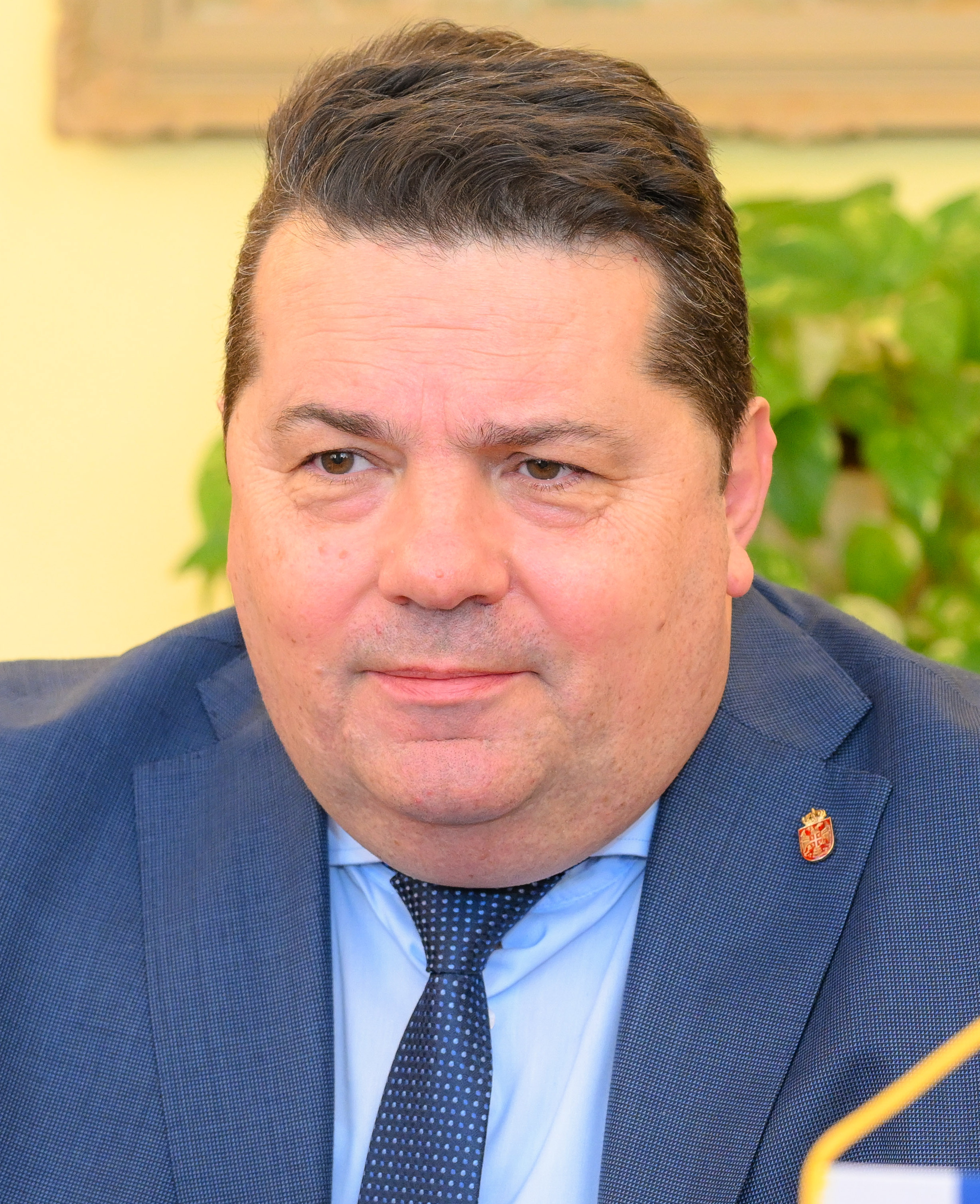
- Incumbent; Nenad Stevandić since 15 November 2022
- Residence: Banja Luka
- Appointer: National Assembly of Republika Srpska
- Inaugural holder: Momčilo Krajišnik
- Formation: 25 October 1991

This article lists the speakers of the National Assembly of the Republika Srpska.

== List of officeholders ==
Serb Democratic Party Socialist Party Alliance of Independent Social Democrats Democratic People's Alliance Democratic Union United Srpska

No.	Portrait	Name (Birth–Death)	Term of office	Time in office	Party
1		Momčilo Krajišnik; Момчило Крајишник (1945–2020)	25 October 1991 – 19 October 1996	4 years, 360 days	Serb Democratic Party
2		Dragan Kalinić; Драган Калинић (born 1948)	19 October 1996 – 4 November 1998	2 years, 16 days	Serb Democratic Party
3		Petar Đokić; Петар Ђокић (born 1961)	4 November 1998 – 16 December 2000	2 years, 42 days	Socialist Party
(2)		Dragan Kalinić; Драган Калинић (born 1948)	16 December 2000 – 29 June 2004	3 years, 196 days	Serb Democratic Party
4		Dušan Stojičić; Душан Стојичић (born 1963)	29 June 2004 – 28 February 2006	1 year, 223 days	Serb Democratic Party
5		Igor Radojičić; Игор Радојичић (born 1966)	28 February 2006 – 24 November 2014	8 years, 269 days	Alliance of Independent Social Democrats
6		Nedeljko Čubrilović; Недељко Чубриловић (born 1953)	24 November 2014 – 15 November 2022	7 years, 356 days	Democratic People's Alliance (until 2018)
6		Nedeljko Čubrilović; Недељко Чубриловић (born 1953)	24 November 2014 – 15 November 2022	7 years, 356 days	Democratic Union (from 2018)
7		Nenad Stevandić; Ненад Стевандић (born 1966)	15 November 2022 – present	3 years, 343 days	United Srpska

== Standard ==
Standard of the president of the People's Assembly of Republika Srpska 1995–2007.

== See also ==
- President of Republika Srpska
  - List of presidents of Republika Srpska
- List of vice presidents of Republika Srpska
- List of prime ministers of Republika Srpska
