= Nedeljko Čubrilović =

Bosnian Serb politician (born 1953)

- Недељко Чубриловић
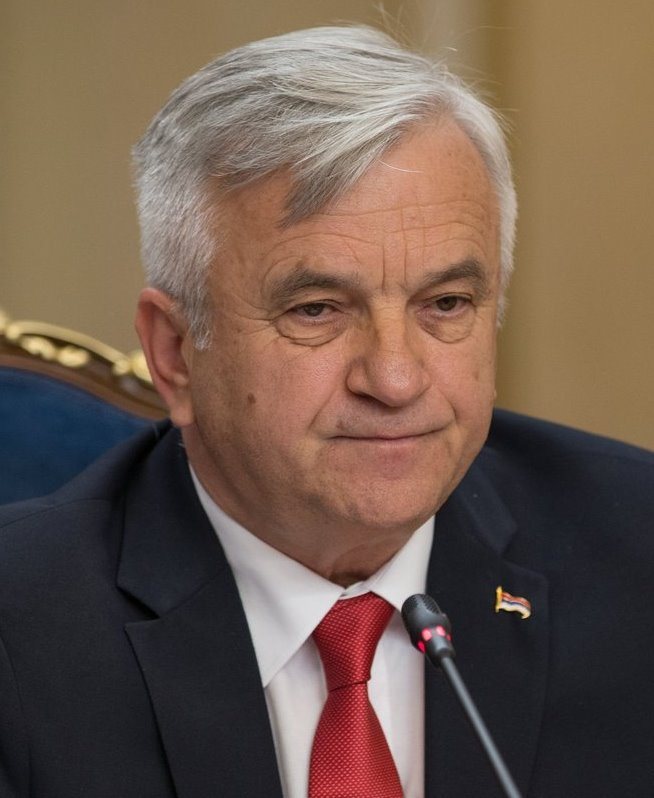
- Čubrilović in 2019

Speaker of the National Assembly of Republika Srpska
- In office 24 November 2014 – 15 November 2022
- Prime Minister: Željka Cvijanović; Radovan Višković
- Preceded by: Igor Radojičić
- Succeeded by: Nenad Stevandić

Personal details
- Born: 5 April 1953 (age 73) Krupa na Vrbasu, PR Bosnia and Herzegovina, FPR Yugoslavia
- Party: DEMOS (2018–present)
- Other political affiliations: Democratic People's Alliance (2000–2018)
- Spouse: Miloja Čubrilović
- Children: 2
- Education: University of Banja Luka

Nedeljko Čubrilović (Serbian Cyrillic: Недељко Чубриловић; born 5 April 1953) is a Bosnian Serb politician who served as speaker of the National Assembly of Republika Srpska from 2014 to 2022.

In 2000, he joined the Democratic People's Alliance (DNS). The party presidency dismissed Čubrilović as its vice president on 14 November 2018. Shortly after, he was elected as the first president of the newly established Democratic Union on 22 December 2018 in Banja Luka.

== Personal life ==
Nedeljko is married to Miloja Čubrilović and together they have a son named Đuro and a daughter named Mirjana. He lives and works in Banja Luka.

Political offices
Preceded by Igor Radojičić	Speaker of the National Assembly of Republika Srpska; 2014–2022	Succeeded by Nenad Stevandić
