= Democratic Union (Bosnia and Herzegovina) =

Democratic Union Демократски савез Demokratski savez
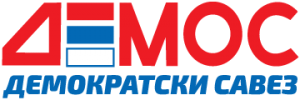
- Leader: Nedeljko Čubrilović
- Founder: Nedeljko Čubrilović
- Founded: 22 December 2018; 7 years ago
- Split from: Democratic People's Alliance
- Headquarters: Kralja Petra I Karađorđevića 109, Banja Luka
- Ideology: Conservatism; Euroscepticism
- Political position: Centre-right
- HoR BiH: 1 / 42
- HoP BiH: 0 / 15
- NA RS: 5 / 83

Website
- demos-rs.com

The Democratic Union (Serbian Cyrillic: Демократски Cавез, DEMOS) is a political party in Republika Srpska, Bosnia and Herzegovina. Its leader is Nedeljko Čubrilović, the former Speaker of the National Assembly of Republika Srpska.

== History ==
The Democratic Union was founded by Nedeljko Čubrilović on 22 December 2018, the former Speaker of the National Assembly of Republika Srpska, who left the Democratic People's Alliance in November 2018.

== List of presidents ==
#	Name (Born–Died)	Portrait	Term of Office	
1	Nedeljko Čubrilović (b. 1953)		22 December 2018	present

== Election results ==
=== Parliamentary Assembly of Bosnia and Herzegovina ===
Parliamentary Assembly of Bosnia and Herzegovina
Year	Leader	#	Popular vote	%	HoR	Seat change	HoP	Seat change	Government
2022	Nedeljko Čubrilović	12th	30,591	1.93	1 / 42	New	0 / 15	New	Support
2026 (Note: Run in coalition with SP, that won the only seat obtained by the coalition.)	Nedeljko Čubrilović	15th	25,769	1.90	0 / 42	▼1	0 / 15	0	Extra-parliamentary

=== National Assembly of Republika Srpska ===
National Assembly of Republika Srpska
Year	Leader	#	Popular vote	%	# of seats	Seat change	Coalition	Government
2022	Nedeljko Čubrilović	6th	34,898	5.46%	5 / 83	New	—	Coalition
2026	Nedeljko Čubrilović	5th	28,551	5.43%	1 / 83	▼4	SP	TBD

== See also ==
- List of political parties in Republika Srpska
