= Pero Bukejlović =

Bosnian Serb politician (born 1946)

- Перо Букејловић

Prime Minister of Republika Srpska
- In office 17 January 2005 – 28 February 2006
- President: Dragan Čavić
- Preceded by: Dragan Mikerević
- Succeeded by: Milorad Dodik

Personal details
- Born: Petar Bukejlović; 9 August 1946 (age 80) Doboj, PR Bosnia and Herzegovina, FPR Yugoslavia
- Party: Serb Democratic Party
- Children: 1
- Education: University of Sarajevo; University of Zagreb

Petar "Pero" Bukejlović (Serbian Cyrillic: Перо Букејловић; born 9 August 1946) is a Bosnian Serb politician who served as Prime Minister of Republika Srpska from 2005 to 2006. He is a member of the Serb Democratic Party.

== Biography ==
Bukejlović was born on 9 August 1946 in Doboj, PR Bosnia and Herzegovina, FPR Yugoslavia. He graduated from the University of Sarajevo, and earned his ME at the University of Zagreb.

A member of the Serb Democratic Party, Bukejlović served as Minister of Industry and Technology in the Government of Republika Srpska from 2001 to 2003. He was appointed Prime Minister of Republika Srpska in January 2005, after the resignation of Dragan Mikerević in December 2004. Bukejlović served as prime minister until February 2006.

Bukejlović is married and has one son.
