= Igor Radojičić =

Bosnian Serb politician (born 1966)

- Игор Радојичић
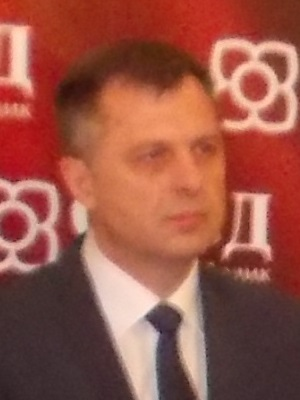
- Radojičić in 2014

President of Republika Srpska
- Acting
- In office 30 September 2007 – 9 December 2007
- Vice President: Adil Osmanović; Davor Čordaš
- Preceded by: Milan Jelić
- Succeeded by: Rajko Kuzmanović

Mayor of Banja Luka
- In office 8 November 2016 – 24 December 2020
- Preceded by: Slobodan Gavranović
- Succeeded by: Draško Stanivuković

Speaker of the National Assembly of Republika Srpska
- In office 28 February 2006 – 24 November 2014
- Prime Minister: Milorad Dodik; Anton Kasipović (acting); Aleksandar Džombić; Željka Cvijanović
- Preceded by: Dušan Stojičić
- Succeeded by: Nedeljko Čubrilović

Personal details
- Born: 13 September 1966 (age 60) Banja Luka, SR Bosnia and Herzegovina, SFR Yugoslavia
- Party: Alliance of Independent Social Democrats (2002–2022)
- Spouse: Sanja Radojičić
- Children: 2

Igor Radojičić (Serbian Cyrillic: Игор Радојичић; born 13 September 1966) is a Bosnian Serb politician who served as mayor of Banja Luka from 2016 until 2020. He previously served as the speaker of the National Assembly of Republika Srpska from 2006 to 2014. Additionally, following the death of president Milan Jelić, Radojičić was acting president of Republika Srpska from October to December 2007.

== Biography ==
Radojičić was born in Banja Luka in 1966, and holds an M.Sc. degree in electrical engineering. In the late 1980s, he was a member of the leadership of the Association of Socialist Youth of Bosnia and Herzegovina and until 2022 the Secretary General of the Alliance of Independent Social Democrats (SNSD), a Serb social democratic party in Bosnia and Herzegovina. Radojičić held the office of Speaker of the National Assembly from 28 February 2006 until 28 November 2014.

He is married to Sanja Radojičić and is a father of two.

Political offices
Preceded by Dušan Stojičić	Speaker of the National Assembly of Republika Srpska; 2006–2014	Succeeded by Nedeljko Čubrilović
Preceded by Milan Jelić	President of Republika Srpska (Acting); 2007	Succeeded by Rajko Kuzmanović
Preceded by Slobodan Gavranović	Mayor of Banja Luka; 2016–2020	Succeeded by Draško Stanivuković
