= Party of Life =

Party of Life may refer to:

- Russian Party of Life
- Party of Life (Japan), Political party in Japan
