= Petar Đokić =

Bosnian Serb politician (born 1961)

- Петар Ђокић

President of Republika Srpska
- Acting
- In office 2 September 1999 – 26 January 2000
- Vice President: Mirko Šarović
- Preceded by: Nikola Poplašen
- Succeeded by: Mirko Šarović

Speaker of the National Assembly of Republika Srpska
- In office 4 November 1998 – 16 December 2000
- Prime Minister: Milorad Dodik
- Preceded by: Dragan Kalinić
- Succeeded by: Dragan Kalinić

Personal details
- Born: 29 July 1961 (age 65) Brčko, PR Bosnia and Herzegovina, FPR Yugoslavia
- Party: Socialist Party (1993–present)
- Other political affiliations: League of Communists (1976–1990)
- Children: 1
- Education: Megatrend University (BEc, MEc)

Petar Đokić (born 29 July 1961) is a Bosnian Serb politician who has served as Minister of Energy and Mining of Republika Srpska since 2014. He has been the president of the Socialist Party since 2002. He previously served as Speaker of the National Assembly of Republika Srpska from 1998 to 2000, acting President of Republika Srpska from 1999 to 2000, and Minister of Labour and Veterans' and Disability Protection from 2010 to 2014.

== Early life and education ==
Đokić was born in Brčko on 29 July 1961. He completed his primary education in his hometown before attending the Secondary School of Internal Affairs in Sarajevo. During his studies, he reportedly worked as a police officer in Brčko.

According to his official biography, Đokić graduated from the Faculty of Economics at the University of Belgrade in 1991. However, the faculty subsequently stated that he had never been enrolled there. Reports later indicated that he obtained a degree in economics, specialising in management, but from the Megatrend International Expert Consortium Limited, a business school, in 1991.

In 1991, Đokić founded the trading company Intermarket in Brčko. During the Bosnian War, he served as a commissioner for refugees and displaced persons in Brčko. He subsequently worked as an inspector at the Commissariat for Refugees of Republika Srpska until 1996.

== Political career ==
Đokić was a member of the Communist Party of Yugoslavia from 1976 until the Bosnian War. During the 1980s, he worked as a secretary at the Brčko office of the League of Socialist Youth of Yugoslavia, a position he held until 1988.

In 1993, Đokić joined the Socialist Party following its establishment. He served as the party's deputy president from 2000 to 2002. At the party's third, extraordinary congress in 2002, he was elected president of the Socialist Party, a position to which he has subsequently been re-elected at successive party congresses.

Đokić was elected to the National Assembly of Republika Srpska in 1997 and subsequently served multiple parliamentary terms. During his parliamentary career, he chaired several parliamentary committees. From 1997 to 2000, he served as Speaker of the National Assembly. Between 2 September 1999 and 26 January 2000, he also served as acting President of Republika Srpska following the removal of Nikola Poplašen from office.

Đokić later served as Minister of Labour, Veterans' and Disability Protection of Republika Srpska in the government of Aleksandar Džombić and the first government of Željka Cvijanović. He subsequently became Minister of Energy and Mining of Republika Srpska in Cvijanović's second government and retained the portfolio in both the governments led by Radovan Višković and the governments led by Savo Minić.

== Legal proceedings ==
On 22 January 2007, the Court of the Brčko District convicted Petar Đokić and sentenced him to three months' imprisonment in a case involving the unauthorized use and resale of telecommunications impulses belonging to Telekom Srpske (now m:tel). According to media reports, the case involved financial damage amounting to 141,508 convertible marks (BAM). On 3 September 2007, the Court of Appeal of the Brčko District upheld the judgment. On 2 December 2009, the Constitutional Court of Bosnia and Herzegovina dismissed Đokić's constitutional appeal as inadmissible.

== Personal life ==
Đokić is divorced and has one son, Bojan, who is also a member of the Socialist Party and a former representative in the Assembly of the Brčko District.
