= Socialist Party (Bosnia and Herzegovina) =

Bosnian Serb political party

Socialist Party Социјалистичка Партија Socijalistička Partija
- President: Petar Đokić
- Founded: 2 June 1993
- Headquarters: Jovana Dučića 25, Banja Luka
- Ideology: Social democracy; Democratic socialism; Euroscepticism
- Political position: Centre-left
- Slogan: Sigurno i slobodno, da Srpska živi i radi (Secure and free, that Srpska lives and works)
- HoR BiH: 0 / 42
- HoP BiH: 0 / 15
- NA RS: 4 / 83

Website
- socijalisti.ba

Old logo of the party, in use until 2021

The Socialist Party (Serbo-Croatian: Социјалистичка Партија, СП / Socijalistička Partija, SP) is a social-democratic political party in Bosnia and Herzegovina.

Formed on 2 June 1993 in Banja Luka, it served as one of the first democratic alternatives to the nationalist government of Republika Srpska. After the signing of the Dayton Agreement, the party became a vocal opponent of the government of Radovan Karadžić and the Serb Democratic Party.

Its subsequent coalitions with the increasingly-nationalist Alliance of Independent Social Democrats and the Democratic People's Alliance have, however, diminished its standing as a leftist and multi-ethnic party.

The party is currently serving in the governing majority in Republika Srpska, following the 2022 general election.

== Election results ==
=== Parliamentary Assembly of Bosnia and Herzegovina ===
Parliamentary Assembly of Bosnia and Herzegovina
Year	Popular vote	%	HoR	Seat change	HoP	Seat change	Government
1996 (Note: Run as part of the People's Alliance for Free Peace.)	136,077	5.67	1 / 42	New	0 / 15	New	Opposition
1998 (Note: Run in coalition with SNS and SNSD.)	214,716	12.44	1 / 42	0	1 / 15	▲1	Coalition
2000	38,851	2.61	1 / 42	0	1 / 15	0	Coalition
2002	23,533	1.91	1 / 42	0	0 / 15	▼1	Opposition
2006	14,331	1.01	0 / 42	▼1	0 / 15	0	Extra-parliamentary
2010	14,573	0.89	0 / 42	0	0 / 15	0	Extra-parliamentary
2014	18,729	1.15	0 / 42	0	0 / 15	0	Extra-parliamentary
2018	31,321	1.89	1 / 42	▲1	0 / 15	0	Support
2022	23,018	1.45	0 / 42	▼1	0 / 15	0	Extra-parliamentary
2026 (Note: Run in coalition with DEMOS, winning the only seat obtained by the coalition.)	25,769	1.90	1 / 42	▲1	0 / 15	0	TBD

=== National Assembly of Republika Srpska ===
National Assembly of Republika Srpska
Year	Popular vote	% of popular vote	# of seats	Seat change	Government	
1996	Dragutin Ilić	125,372	11.53%	9 / 83	New	Opposition
1997	Živko Radišić	78,150	10.84%	9 / 83	Steady	Coalition
1998	Živko Radišić	79,179	10.67%	10 / 83	▲1	Coalition
2000	Živko Radišić	30,636	4.89%	4 / 83	▼6	Opposition
2002	Petar Đokić	21,502	4.21%	3 / 83	▼1	Opposition
2006	Petar Đokić	20,031	3.55%	3 / 83	Steady	Coalition
2010	Petar Đokić	26,824	4.23%	3 / 83	Steady	Coalition
2014	Petar Đokić	33,695	5.09%	5 / 83	▲2	Coalition
2018	Petar Đokić	56,106	8.19%	7 / 83	▲2	Coalition
2022	Petar Đokić	37,919	5.93%	5 / 83	▼2	Coalition
2026 (Note: Run in coalition with DEMOS.)	Petar Đokić	28,551	5.43%	4 / 83	▼1	TBD

== Positions held ==
Major positions held by Socialist Party members:

Member of the Presidency of Bosnia and Herzegovina	Years
Živko Radišić	1998–2002
Co-chairman of the Council of Ministers of Bosnia and Herzegovina	Years
Svetozar Mihajlović	1999–2000
Speaker of the National Assembly of Republika Srpska	Years
Petar Đokić	1998–2000
