= Nenad Stevandić =

Bosnian Serb politician and physician (born 1966)

- Ненад Стевандић
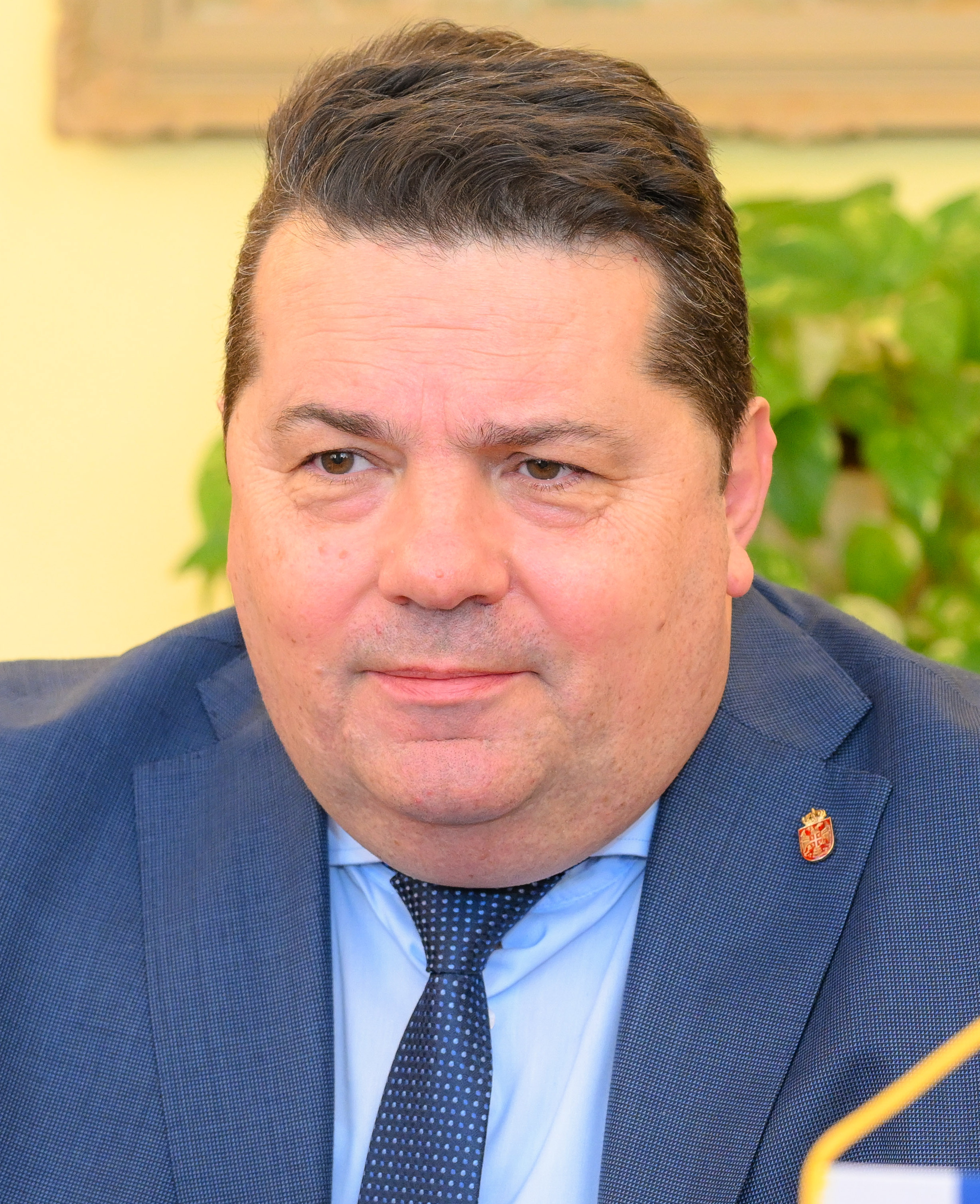
- Stevandić in 2025

Speaker of the National Assembly of Republika Srpska
- Incumbent
- Assumed office 15 November 2022
- Prime Minister: Radovan Višković; Savo Minić; Anđelka Kuzmić (acting)
- Preceded by: Nedeljko Čubrilović

Personal details
- Born: 12 October 1966 (age 60) Drvar, SR Bosnia and Herzegovina, SFR Yugoslavia
- Party: United Srpska (2015–present)
- Other political affiliations: Serb Democratic Party (1990–1997; 2008–2015)
- Spouse: Nataša Stevandić
- Children: 3
- Education: University of Banja Luka (MB)

Nenad Stevandić (Serbo-Croatian Cyrillic: Ненад Стевандић; born 12 October 1966) is a Bosnian Serb politician and physician serving as speaker of the National Assembly of Republika Srpska since November 2022. He is the president of the United Srpska party and was previously a member of the Serb Democratic Party until 2015.

== Early life and medical career ==
Stevandić was born in Drvar on 12 October 1966. He graduated from the Medical faculty at the University of Banja Luka in 1995 and specialized otorhinolaryngology in 2002 in Belgrade.

During the Bosnian War, Stevandić served in the Army of Republika Srpska. His wartime activities have been the subject of controversy. He has been accused of involvement in war crimes, including allegations that he ordered the 1992 killing of Miodrag Šušnica, a member of the Serbian State Security Directorate, in Banja Luka. He has also been linked to Radovan Karadžić and Slobodan Milošević. Video recordings circulated appear to show Stevandić participating in the mistreatment of Bosniak and Croat civilians and entering private property in Kotor Varoš and Banja Luka during the war. Referring to his wartime role, Stevandić has stated that he is "proud" of his actions.

After completing his studies, Stevandić got a job at the University Clinical Center of the Republika Srpska, where he has been working since. He was named its vice superintendent in 2018.

== Political career ==
Stevandić alongside Russian president Vladimir Putin, 9 May 2026

Stevandić became a member of a political party for the first time in 1990, when the Serb Democratic Party (SDS) was founded; this was the party he had been a member of for the following seven years. He re-joined the SDS in 2008 and was elected to the National Assembly of Republika Srpska in the 2010 general election. Stevandić was re-elected to the National Assembly in the 2014 general election. He then left the SDS in 2015 and founded the United Srpska political party.

Following the 2022 general election, Stevandić was appointed speaker of the National Assembly of Republika Srpska in November 2022.

In March 2025, the Court of Bosnia and Herzegovina issued arrest warrants against Stevandić, Republika Srpska president Milorad Dodik, and Republika Srpska prime minister Radovan Višković for anti-constitutional conduct regarding Dodik's refusal to serve his imprisonment following his conviction for defying the High Representative for Bosnia and Herzegovina. Stevandić was reported to be in Serbia at the time the warrants were issued. The court also requested the issuance of an international arrest warrant against Dodik and Stevandić from Interpol. Ultimately, Interpol rejected the request for the arrest warrant, deeming the persecution of him and Dodik as politically motivated.

In July 2025, Stevandić and Radovan Višković voluntarily appeared before the Court of Bosnia and Herzegovina. The hearing was conducted following a motion submitted by the Prosecutor’s Office of Bosnia and Herzegovina. Acting upon the motion, the Court issued a decision revoking the previously ordered arrest warrant against the two of them, replacing it with a precautionary measure only requiring both of them to report periodically to a designated state authority.

=== Sanctions ===
On 31 July 2023, the United States Office of Foreign Assets Control imposed sanctions on Stevandić under Executive Order 14033 for threatening regional security, peace, cooperation, and undermining the Dayton Agreement related to the Western Balkans.

In October 2025, the United States lifted sanctions on Milorad Dodik, allegedly after several close allies of U.S. president Donald Trump pushed for a lifting of the sanctions, including MAGA influencer Laura Loomer and first-term Trump administration officials Rudy Giuliani and Michael Flynn. Sanctions were also lifted on Dodik's close allies, including Stevandić and high-ranking SNSD members Željka Cvijanović, Radovan Višković and Siniša Karan.

== Personal life ==
Stevandić and his wife Nataša have three children and own a family house in Banja Luka. They also own an apartment in Belgrade.

On 18 January 2021, it was confirmed that he tested positive for COVID-19, amid its pandemic in Bosnia and Herzegovina.

== Controversies ==
The Central Election Commission of Bosnia and Herzegovina banned Stevandić's United Srpska from participating in the 2020 municipal elections, with him being financially fined; the reason was publication of a video that could aspire hatred.

Political offices
Preceded by Nedeljko Čubrilović	Speaker of the National Assembly of Republika Srpska; 2022–present	Incumbent
