= Željka Cvijanović =

Bosnian Serb politician (born 1967)

- Жељка Цвијановић
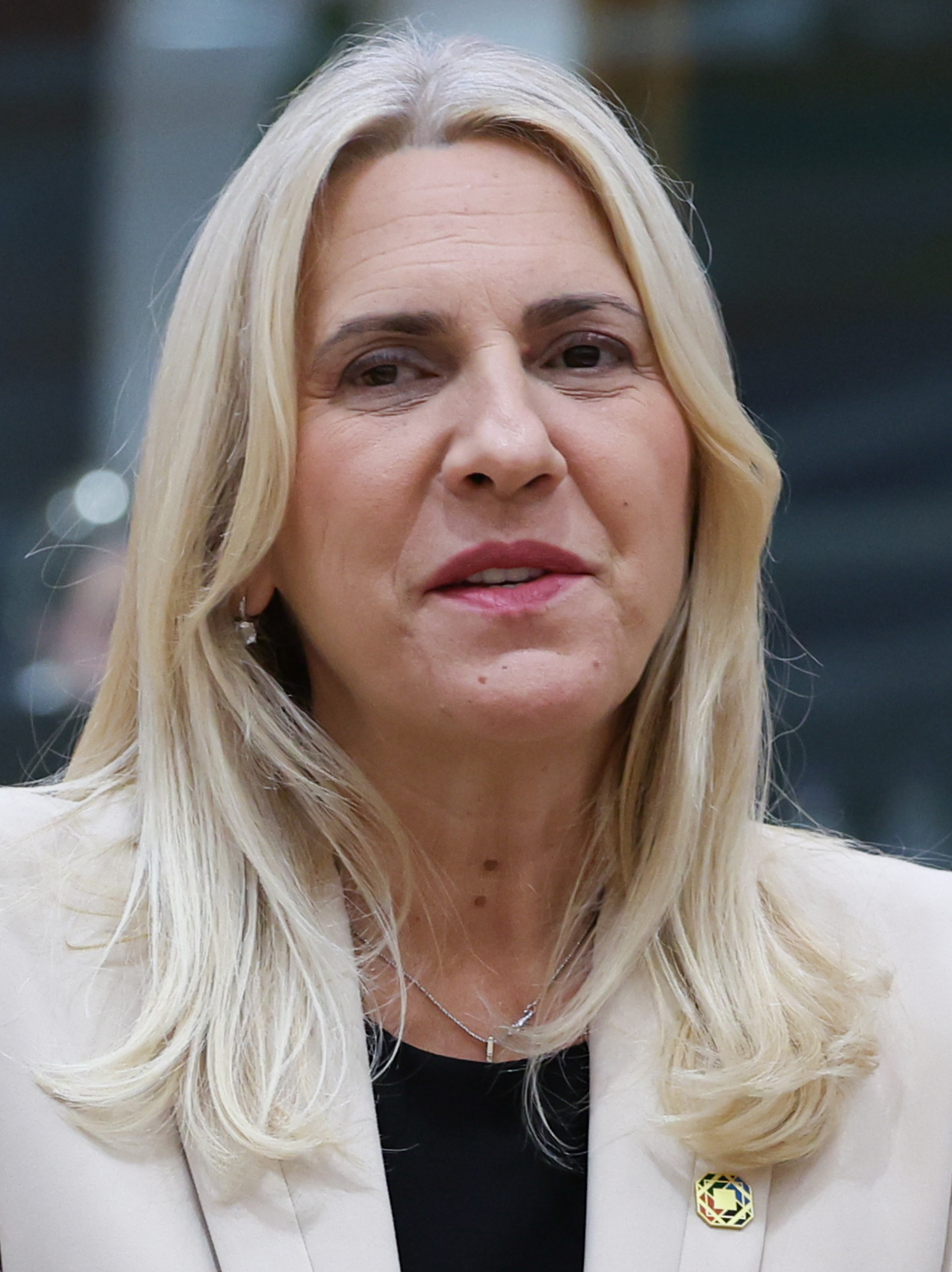
- Cvijanović in 2024

Serb member of the Presidency of Bosnia and Herzegovina
- Incumbent
- Assumed office 16 November 2022 (Note: Serving as the Chairwoman of the Presidency from 16 November 2022 to 16 July 2023, from 16 November 2024 to 16 July 2025, and since 16 November 2026)
- Prime Minister: Zoran Tegeltija; Borjana Krišto
- Preceded by: Milorad Dodik

President of Republika Srpska
- In office 19 November 2018 – 15 November 2022
- Preceded by: Milorad Dodik
- Succeeded by: Milorad Dodik

Prime Minister of Republika Srpska
- In office 12 March 2013 – 19 November 2018
- President: Milorad Dodik
- Preceded by: Aleksandar Džombić
- Succeeded by: Radovan Višković

Personal details
- Born: Željka Grabovac; 4 March 1967 (age 59) Teslić, SR Bosnia and Herzegovina, SFR Yugoslavia
- Party: Alliance of Independent Social Democrats
- Spouse: Aleksandar Cvijanović
- Children: 2
- Education: University of Sarajevo (attended); University of Banja Luka (BA, LLM)

Željka Cvijanović (née Grabovac; Serbian Cyrillic: Жељка Цвијановић, née Грабовац, pronounced [ʒêːʎka tsʋijǎːnoʋitɕ]; born 4 March 1967) is a Bosnian Serb politician who has served as the Serb member of the Presidency of Bosnia and Herzegovina since 2022. She has also served as chairwoman of the Presidency since November 2026. She previously served as president of Republika Srpska from 2018 to 2022.

A member of the Alliance of Independent Social Democrats, Cvijanović was prime minister of Republika Srpska from 2013 to 2018. In the 2018 general election, she was elected president of Republika Srpska, assuming office on 19 November 2018. In the 2022 general election, Cvijanović was elected as the Serb member of the Presidency of Bosnia and Herzegovina, becoming the first female member of the Presidency since the end of the Bosnian War. She was sworn in as Presidency member in November 2022. She was re-elected to a second term in the 2026 election.

== Early life and education ==
Cvijanović was born Željka Grabovac in Teslić, present-day Bosnia and Herzegovina on 4 March 1967. Before entering politics, she worked as an English teacher. She began her studies at the Faculty of Humanities of the University of Sarajevo before graduating from the Faculty of Philosophy at the University of Banja Luka with a degree in English language and literature. She later earned a master's degree in diplomatic law from the University of Banja Luka Faculty of Law, writing a thesis on the international legal status of the European Union.

== Career ==
Cvijanović worked as a senior interpreter and assistant for the European Union Monitoring Mission in Bosnia and Herzegovina before joining the Government of Republika Srpska as an adviser on European integration and international cooperation to Prime Minister Milorad Dodik. She later served as chief of cabinet and headed the government's Unit for Coordination and European Integration.

She entered government in December 2010 as Minister of Economic Relations and Regional Cooperation under Prime Minister Aleksandar Džombić. Following Džombić's resignation, Dodik nominated her as prime minister, and the National Assembly confirmed her appointment on 12 March 2013, making her the first woman to serve as prime minister of Republika Srpska.

In the 2014 general election, Cvijanović was the Alliance of Independent Social Democrats (SNSD)-led coalition's candidate for the Serb seat in the Presidency of Bosnia and Herzegovina but narrowly lost to Mladen Ivanić. She subsequently continued as prime minister.

At the 2018 general election, she was elected president of Republika Srpska and assumed office on 19 November 2018. She remained in office until November 2022, when she was succeeded by Milorad Dodik.

On 11 April 2022, Cvijanović and Milorad Dodik, the Serb member of the Bosnian Presidency, were sanctioned by the United Kingdom for attempting to undermine the legitimacy of Bosnia and Herzegovina, with British foreign secretary Liz Truss stating that Dodik and Cvijanović "are deliberately undermining the hard-won peace in Bosnia and Herzegovina. Encouraged by Putin [Vladimir Putin], their reckless behavior threatens stability and security across the Western Balkans."

== Presidency (2022–present) ==
=== 2022 general election ===
On 1 July 2022, Cvijanović announced her candidacy in the Bosnian general election, running again for Bosnia and Herzegovina's three-person Presidency member, representing the Serbs.

In the general election, held on 2 October 2022, she was elected to the Presidency, having obtained 51.65% of the vote and thus becoming the first female member of the Presidency as established after the Bosnian War. The Serb Democratic Party candidate Mirko Šarović, was second with 35.45%.

=== 2026 general election ===
In July 2026, the SNSD officially announced Cvijanović's bid for re-election in the October 2026 general election. On 4 October, she was re-elected to a second four-year term with a larger margin as opposed to the 2022 election, winning 55.57% of the vote and defeating Marinko Božović and Nebojša Vukanović.

=== Tenure ===
Cvijanović was sworn in as Presidency member on 16 November 2022, alongside newly elected member Denis Bećirović and re-elected member Željko Komšić.

Following the 2022 general election, a coalition led by the SNSD, the Croatian Democratic Union and the liberal alliance Troika reached an agreement on the formation of a new government, designating Borjana Krišto as the new Chairwoman of the Council of Ministers. The Presidency officially nominated her as chairwoman-designate on 22 December; Cvijanović and Bećirović voted for, while Komšić voted against.

On 31 July 2023, the United States Office of Foreign Assets Control imposed sanctions on Cvijanović under Executive Order 14033 for threatening regional security, peace, cooperation, and undermining the Dayton Agreement related to the Western Balkans. In October 2025, the United States lifted sanctions on SNSD leader Milorad Dodik, allegedly after several close allies of U.S. president Donald Trump pushed for a lifting of the sanctions, including MAGA influencer Laura Loomer and first-term Trump administration officials Rudy Giuliani and Michael Flynn. Sanctions were also lifted on Dodik's close allies, including Cvijanović and fellow high-ranking SNSD members Radovan Višković and Siniša Karan, as well as National Assembly of Republika Srpska speaker Nenad Stevandić.

In 2024, Cvijanović campaigned against the United Nations General Assembly resolution establishing an International Day of Reflection and Commemoration of the 1995 Srebrenica genocide, arguing that it unfairly stigmatized Republika Srpska and the Serb people. Her position drew criticism from victims' associations and Bosniak political representatives.

==== Foreign policy ====
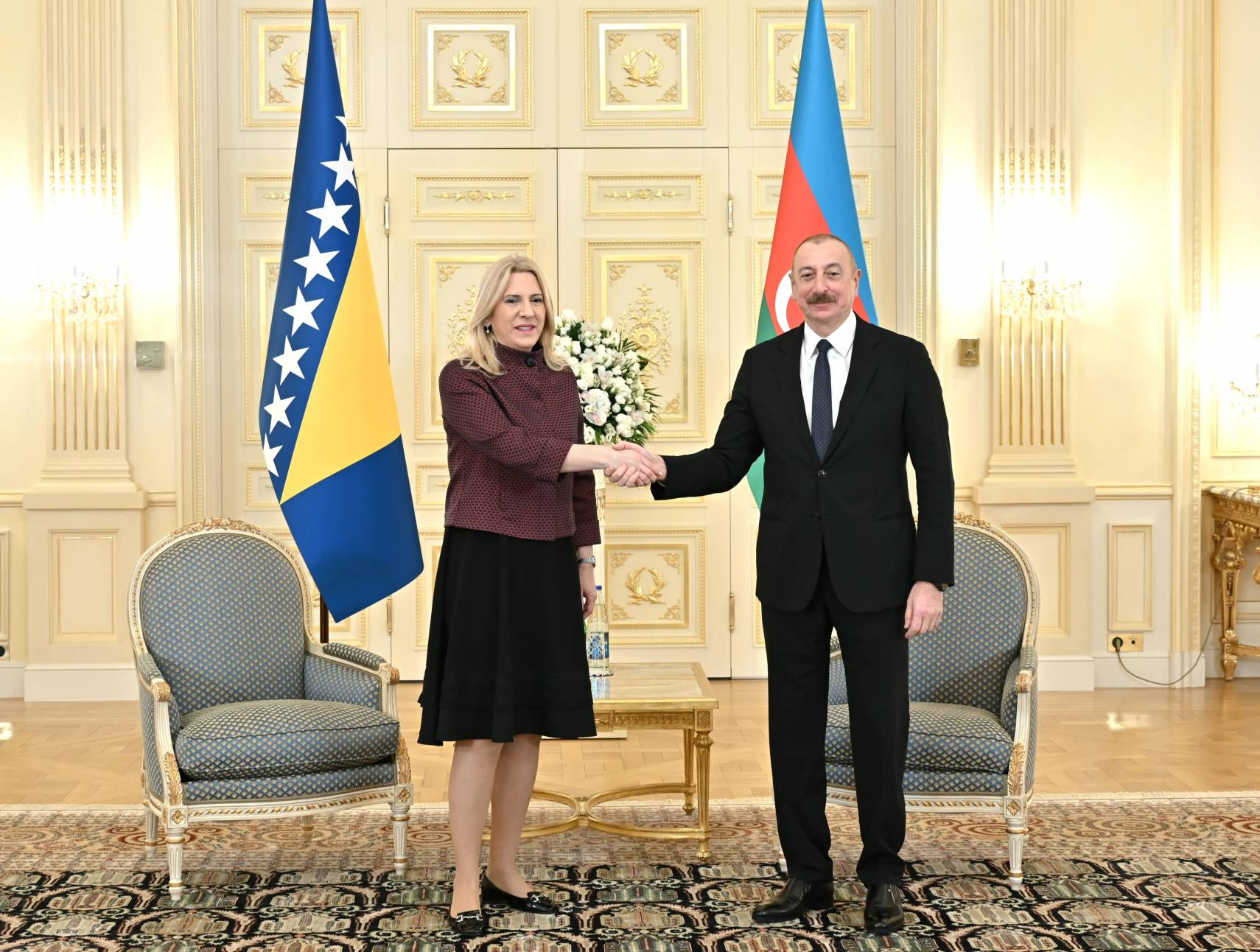
Cvijanović alongside Azerbaijani president Ilham Aliyev, 1 March 2023

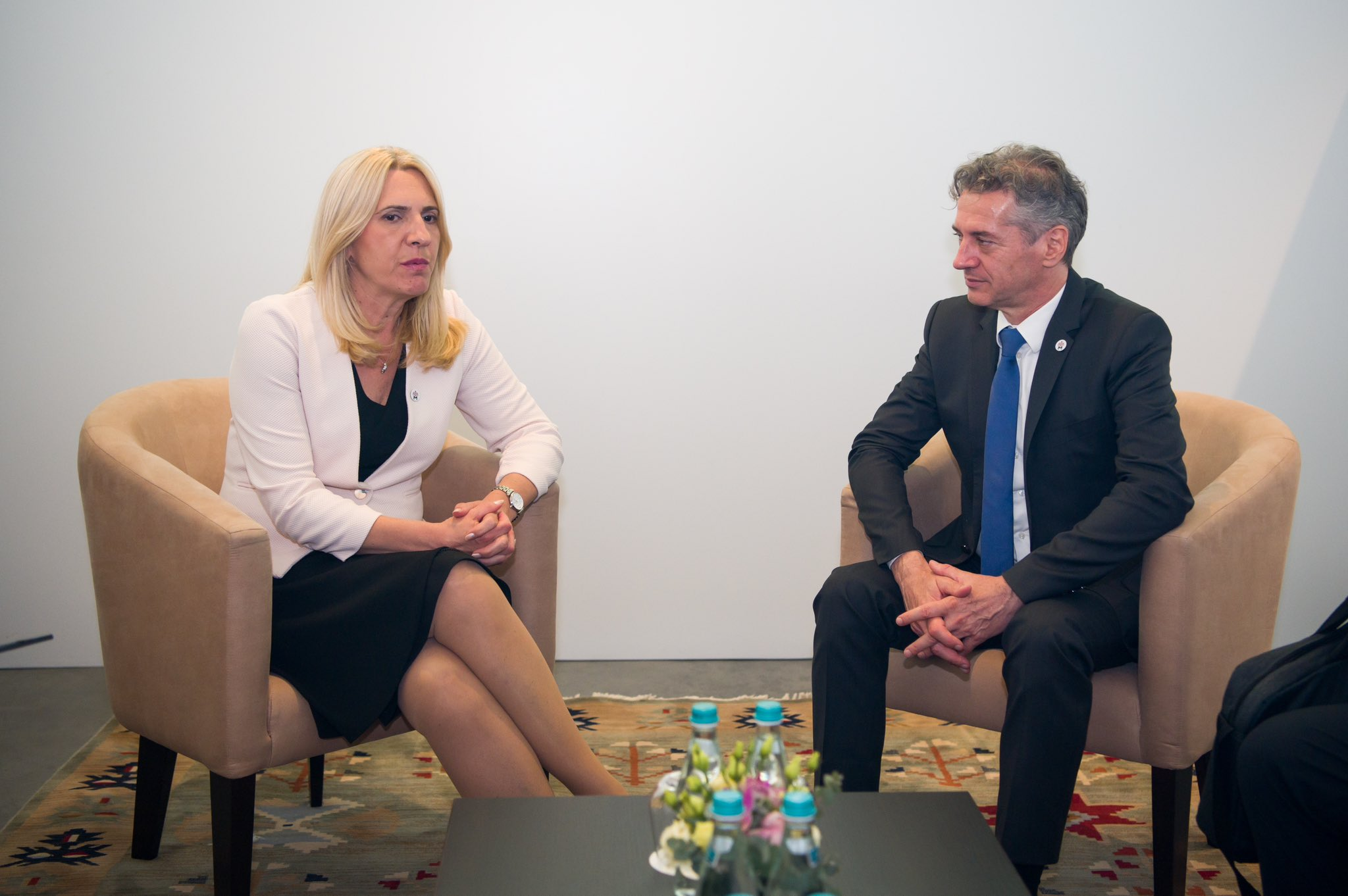
Cvijanović in a meeting with Slovenian prime minister Robert Golob, 1 June 2023

On 9 November 2023, Cvijanović met with French President Emmanuel Macron during an official visit to France. They discussed bilateral relations between Bosnia and Herzegovina and France, as well as implementing economic reforms.

In January 2024, Cvijanović attended the 19th Summit of the Non-Aligned Movement in Kampala, Uganda, during which she said that "the policy of non-alignment has obviously withstood the test of time, and its principles and values are still very much needed by the world today, just like sixty years ago."

In October 2025, following the brokering of the Gaza peace plan and the start of a third ceasefire in the Gaza war, the Bosnian Presidency unanimously decided to nominate Donald Trump for the Nobel Peace Prize for his "commitment to establishing lasting peace in Gaza" and the Middle East. This marked the first official nomination for the 2026 edition of the award. The nomination came less than two months after Cvijanović brought the nomination to the agenda for the first time. In August, however, her proposal was rejected, as it did not contain "proper documentation."

Following the lifting of sanctions against her in October 2025, Cvijanović made several visits to the United States. During these visits, she met with, among others, Congressman Randy Fine, and political commentator Sebastian Gorka.

During the 2026 Iran war, Cvijanović called for the adoption of a resolution critical of Iran in March 2026; however, the proposal was not adopted by the Presidency.

Cvijanović has consistently advocated closer relations with Israel, describing the relationship as one based on "honest friendship." She has met several Israeli officials, including Ambassador to the United States Yechiel Leiter. During an official visit to Israel in June 2026, she held talks with Prime Minister Benjamin Netanyahu, Foreign Minister Gideon Sa'ar, and President Isaac Herzog. The visit attracted attention in Bosnia and Herzegovina after Cvijanović raised concerns regarding the "protection of Christians in the country" and criticised what she described as growing antisemitism among Bosniaks during an interview with the Israeli newspaper Israel Hayom. It also sparked a diplomatic dispute after Israeli officials displayed the flag of Republika Srpska instead of the flag of Bosnia and Herzegovina during official meetings, prompting Foreign Minister Elmedin Konaković to issue a formal protest note.

==== European Union ====
Cvijanović has supported Bosnia and Herzegovina's European Union accession, backing the country's recognition as an EU candidate in December 2022 and later supporting the opening of accession negotiations in 2024 after the adoption of key reforms.

On 8 February 2024, the Presidency unanimously adopted the decision to start negotiations with Frontex, one of the country’s key conditions for opening negotiations with the EU. On 21 March 2024, at a summit in Brussels, all 27 EU leaders, representing the European Council, unanimously agreed to open EU accession talks with Bosnia and Herzegovina after the Council of Ministers adopted two more European laws. Talks are set to begin following the impeding of more reforms.

== Personal life ==
Željka is married to Aleksandar Cvijanović, and together they have two sons, Filip and Stefan. They live in Banja Luka. She has two grandchildren.

She is of paternal Bosnian Serb and maternal Bosnian Croat descent.

== Orders ==
Award or decoration	Country	Awarded by	Year	Place
Order of the Republic of Serbia	Serbia	Aleksandar Vučić	2022	Belgrade

== Notes ==
Political offices
Preceded by Aleksandar Džombić	Prime Minister of Republika Srpska; 2013–2018	Succeeded by Radovan Višković
Preceded by Milorad Dodik	President of Republika Srpska; 2018–2022	Succeeded by Milorad Dodik
Preceded by Milorad Dodik	Serb member of the Presidency of Bosnia and Herzegovina; 2022–present	Incumbent
Preceded by Šefik Džaferović	Chairwoman of the Presidency of Bosnia and Herzegovina; 2022–2023	Succeeded by Željko Komšić
Preceded by Denis Bećirović	Chairwoman of the Presidency of Bosnia and Herzegovina; 2024–2025	Succeeded by Željko Komšić
Preceded by Denis Bećirović	Chairwoman of the Presidency of Bosnia and Herzegovina; 2026–present	Incumbent
