= Democratic People's Alliance =

Bosnian Serb political party

Democratic People's Alliance Демократски народни савез Demokratski narodni savez
- Leader: Nenad Nešić
- Founded: 17 June 2000
- Split from: Serb National Alliance
- Headquarters: Banja Luka
- Ideology: Serbian nationalism; National conservatism; Euroscepticism
- Political position: Centre-right to right-wing
- HoR BiH: 1 / 42
- HoP BiH: 0 / 15
- NA RS: 2 / 83

Website
- www.dnsrs.org

The Democratic People's Alliance (Serbian: Демократски народни савез/Demokratski narodni savez or DNS) is a centre-right political party in Republic of Srpska and Bosnia and Herzegovina. The head of the DNS is Nenad Nešić.

== Election results ==
=== Parliamentary Assembly of Bosnia and Herzegovina ===
Parliamentary Assembly of Bosnia and Herzegovina
Year	Leader	Popular vote	%	HoR	Seat change	HoP	Seat change	Government
2000	Dragan Kostić	20,427	1.37	0 / 42	New	1 / 15	New	Opposition
2002	Dragan Kostić	17,432	1.42	0 / 42	Steady	0 / 15	▼1	Extra-parliamentary
2006	Marko Pavić	20,100	1.42	1 / 42	▲1	0 / 15	Steady	Support
2010	Marko Pavić	29,658	1.81	1 / 42	Steady	1 / 15	▲1	Support
2014	Marko Pavić	37,052	2.27	1 / 42	Steady	1 / 15	Steady	Opposition
2018	Marko Pavić	69,289	4.18	1 / 42	Steady	0 / 15	▼1	Coalition
2022	Nenad Nešić	21,832	1.37	0 / 42	▼1	0 / 15	Steady	Extra-parliamentary
2026 (Note: Run in coalition with NPS, winning the only seat obtained by the coalition.)	Nenad Nešić	29,416	2.17	1 / 42	▲1	TBD	TBD	TBD

=== National Assembly of Republika Srpska ===
National Assembly of Republika Srpska
Year	Popular vote	%	# of seats	Seat change	Government
2000	22,083	3.5	3 / 83	New	Opposition
2002	20,375	4.0	3 / 83	0	Opposition
2006	22,780	4.4	4 / 83	▲1	Coalition
2010	38,547	6.9	6 / 83	▲2	Coalition
2014	61,016	9.22	5 / 83	▼1	Coalition
2018	98,851	14.44	12 / 83	▲7	Coalition (until 2020)
2018	98,851	14.44	12 / 83	▲7	Opposition (from 2020)
2022	28,502	4.46	4 / 83	▼8	Support
2026 (Note: Run in coalition with NPS.)	29,383	5.58	5 / 83	▲1	TBD

=== Presidential elections ===
Presidency of Bosnia and Herzegovina
Election year	#	Candidate	Votes	%	Note	Elected?
2002	9th	Milorad Đokić	16,129	3.18%	—	No
2014	▲2nd	Željka Cvijanović	310,658	47.56%	Support	No
2022	▼3rd	Nenad Nešić	34,955	5.51%	—	No

President of Republika Srpska
Election year	#	Candidate	Votes	%	Note	Elected?
2002	5th	Dragan Kostić	31,401	6.15%	—	No
2014	▲1st	Milorad Dodik	303,496	45.40%	Support	Yes
2022	▼6th	Radislav Jovičević	5,613	0.89%	—	No

== Mergers ==
- The Alliance of National Rebirth or League of People's Rebirth (Савез Народног Препорода, Savez Narodnog Preporoda) was a conservative party led by Mirko Banjac, established in 2002, and merged into DNS in the fall of 2003. In its last legislative elections, 5 October 2002, the party won no seats in the House of Representatives of Bosnia and Herzegovina, but it won 1 out of 83 in the National Assembly of the Republic of Srpska.

== Positions held ==
Major positions held by Democratic People's Alliance members:

Speaker of the National Assembly of Republika Srpska	Years
Nedeljko Čubrilović	2014–2018
