= Serb Democratic Party (Bosnia and Herzegovina) =

Bosnian Serb political party

Serb Democratic Party Српска демократска странка Srpska demokratska stranka
- Abbreviation: SDS (СДС)
- President: Branko Blanuša
- Founder: Radovan Karadžić
- Founded: 12 July 1990; 36 years ago
- Headquarters: Trg Ilidžanske brigade, Pale, Istočno Sarajevo
- Youth wing: Youth SDS
- Membership: 40,000
- Ideology: Serbian nationalism; Conservatism; Euroscepticism
- Political position: Centre-right to right-wing
- Regional affiliation: Serb Democratic Party (Croatia) (1990–1995) Serb Democratic Party (Serbia) (1990–2003)
- Colors: Blue
- HoR BiH: 2 / 42
- HoP BiH: 1 / 15
- NA RS: 9 / 83
- Mayors: 9 / 145

Party flag

Website
- www.sds.rs

The Serb Democratic Party (Serbian: Српска демократска странка, СДС, Srpska demokratska stranka, SDS) is a Serb conservative political party in Bosnia and Herzegovina. Radovan Karadžić founded it in 1990, ahead of the first multi-party Bosnian general election.

In the parliamentary elections of October 2006, the SDS lost its status as the leading party in Republika Srpska and the main Serb party in Bosnia and Herzegovina to the Alliance of Independent Social Democrats (SNSD), led by the president of Republika Srpska Milorad Dodik. Despite making minor gains in the 2010 and 2014 elections, by 2018 the party had fallen to below 20% of the parliament, the lowest seat standing in its history.

The party is under sanctions from the United States for "failing to arrest and turn over war crimes suspects to an international tribunal." The sanctions prohibit any transfer of funds and material from the United States to the SDS and vice versa. The party is on the list of Specially Designated Nationals and Blocked Persons by the Office of Foreign Assets Control U.S. agency. To avoid the sanctions, the SDS officials established a separate legal entity called SDS – The Will of the People (Serbian: СДС – Воља народа) in 2020.

== History ==
=== Establishment ===
Radovan Karadžić founded the Serb Democratic Party in July 1990. The party aimed at unifying the Bosnian Serb community, as Jovan Rašković's Serb Democratic Party did with the Serbs in Croatia, and staying part of Yugoslavia (as the "Third Yugoslavia" with Serbia and Montenegro) in the event of secession by those two republics from the federation.

=== 1991 ===
Throughout September 1991, the SDS began to establish various "Serb Autonomous Regions" throughout Bosnia and Herzegovina. After the Bosnian parliament voted on sovereignty on 15 October 1991, a separate Serb Assembly was founded on 24 October 1991 in Banja Luka, in order to exclusively represent the Serbs in Bosnia and Herzegovina. The following month, Bosnian Serbs held a referendum which resulted in an overwhelming vote in favor of staying in a federal state with Serbia and Montenegro, as part of Yugoslavia. In December 1991, a top-secret document entitled ‘For the organization and activity of organs of the Serbs people in Bosnia-Herzegovina in extraordinary circumstances’ was drawn up by the SDS leadership. This was a centralized program for the takeover of each municipality in the country, through the creation of shadow governments and para-governmental structures through various "crisis headquarters", and by preparing loyal Serbs for the takeover in co-ordination with the Yugoslav People's Army (JNA).

== Ideology ==
Historically, the party had a strong ultranationalist, separatist and Islamophobic ideology.

== List of presidents ==
No.	Name (Birth–Death)	Portrait	Term of office	
1	Radovan Karadžić (born 1945)		12 July 1990	19 July 1996
2	Aleksa Buha (born 1939)		19 July 1996	1 July 1998
3	Dragan Kalinić (born 1948)		1 July 1998	20 July 2004
4	Dragan Čavić (born 1958)		20 July 2004	15 December 2006
5	Mladen Bosić (born 1961)		15 December 2006	8 October 2016
6	Vukota Govedarica (born 1976)		23 October 2016	30 June 2019
7	Mirko Šarović (born 1956)		30 June 2019	12 November 2022
8	Milan Miličević (born 1963)		12 November 2022	13 July 2025
—	Jovica Radulović (born 1983); Acting		13 July 2025	28 December 2025
9	Branko Blanuša (born 1969)		28 December 2025	Incumbent

== Election results ==
=== Parliamentary Assembly of Bosnia and Herzegovina ===
Assembly of the Socialist Republic of Bosnia and Herzegovina
Year	Leader	Popular vote	%	# of seats	Government
1990	Radovan Karadžić	590,431	26.14	72 / 240	Coalition

Parliamentary Assembly of Bosnia and Herzegovina
Year	Leader	Popular vote	%	HoR	Seat change	HoP	Seat change	Government
1996	Aleksa Buha	578,723	24.11	9 / 42	New	5 / 15	New	Coalition
1998	Dragan Kalinić	162,721	9.43	4 / 42	▼5	1 / 15	▼4	Opposition
2000	Dragan Kalinić	248,579	16.68	6 / 42	▲2	1 / 15	0	Opposition
2002	Dragan Kalinić	172,544	14.04	5 / 42	▼1	3 / 15	▲2	Coalition
2006	Dragan Čavić	108,616	7.69	3 / 42	▼2	1 / 15	▼2	Opposition
2010	Mladen Bosić	137,844	8.40	4 / 42	▲1	1 / 15	0	Coalition (2010–2013)
2010	Mladen Bosić	137,844	8.40	4 / 42	▲1	1 / 15	0	Opposition (2013–2014)
2014	Mladen Bosić	211,562	12.97	5 / 42	▲1	2 / 15	▲1	Coalition
2018 (Note: Ran in coalition with NDP, NS and SRS.)	Vukota Govedarica	162,414	9.80	3 / 42	▼2	1 / 15	▼1	Opposition
2022	Mirko Šarović	112,250	7.07	2 / 42	▼1	1 / 15	0	Opposition
2026	Branko Blanuša	71,489	5.28	2 / 42	0	TBD	TBD	TBD

=== National Assembly of Republika Srpska ===
National Assembly of Republika Srpska
Year	Leader	Popular vote	% of popular vote	# of seats	Seat change	Coalition	Government
1991	Radovan Karadžić	MPs that left the Bosnian parliament		72 / 83	—	—	Majority
1996	Aleksa Buha	568,980	52.3%	45 / 83	▼27	—	Majority
1997	Aleksa Buha	209,767	28.9%	24 / 83	▼21	—	Opposition
1998	Dragan Kalinić	160,594	21.7%	19 / 83	▼5	—	Opposition
2000	Dragan Kalinić	226,226	36.1%	31 / 83	▲12	—	Coalition
2002	Dragan Kalinić	159,164	31.2%	26 / 83	▼5	—	Coalition
2006	Dragan Čavić	103,035	18.27%	17 / 83	▼9	—	Opposition
2010	Mladen Bosić	120,136	18.97%	18 / 83	▲1	—	Opposition
2014	Mladen Bosić	173,824	26.26%	21 / 83	▲3	With SRS RS	Opposition
2018	Vukota Govedarica	123,515	18.04%	16 / 83	▼5	With SRS RS	Opposition
2022	Mirko Šarović	95,648	14.95%	13 / 83	▼3	—	Opposition
2026	Branko Blanuša	66,104	11.98%	10 / 83	▼3	—	TBD

=== Presidential elections ===
Presidency of Bosnia and Herzegovina
Election year	#	Candidate	Votes	%	Note	Elected?
1996	1st	Momčilo Krajišnik	690,646	67.3%	—	Yes
1998	▼2nd	Momčilo Krajišnik	314,236	44.7%	—	No
2002	▲1st	Mirko Šarović	180,212	35.5%	—	Yes
2006	▼2nd	Mladen Bosić	130,824	24.2%	—	No
2010	2nd	Mladen Ivanić	285,951	47.31%	Support	No
2014	▲1st	Mladen Ivanić	318,196	48.71%	Support	Yes
2018	▼2nd	Mladen Ivanić	292,065	42.74%	Support	No
2022	2nd	Mirko Šarović	224,912	35.45%	—	No
2026	2nd	Marinko Božović	151,746	26.34%	—	No

President of Republika Srpska
Election year	#	Candidate	Votes	%	Note	Elected?
1996	1st	Biljana Plavšić	636.654	59.2%	—	Yes
1998	1st	Nikola Poplašen	322,684	43.9%	Support	Yes
2000	1st	Mirko Šarović	313,572	49.8%	—	Yes
2002	1st	Dragan Čavić	183,121	35.9%	—	Yes
2006	▼2nd	Dragan Čavić	163,041	29.4%	—	No
2007	2nd	Ognjen Tadić	142,898	33.8%	—	No
2010	2nd	Ognjen Tadić	227,239	35.92%	—	No
2014	2nd	Ognjen Tadić	296,021	44.28%	—	No
2018	2nd	Vukota Govedarica	284,140	41.81%	—	No
2022	2nd	Jelena Trivić	273,245	42.84%	Support	No
2025–26	2nd	Branko Blanuša	213,513	48.09%	—	No
2026	2nd	Branko Blanuša	237,071	40.96%	—	No

== Positions held ==
Major positions held by Serb Democratic Party members:

Member of the Presidency of Bosnia and Herzegovina	Years
Momčilo Krajišnik	1996–1998
Mirko Šarović	2002–2003
Borislav Paravac	2003–2006
Chairman of the Council of Ministers of Bosnia and Herzegovina	Years
Boro Bosić	1997–1999
Spasoje Tuševljak	2000
President of Republika Srpska	Years
Radovan Karadžić	1992–1996
Biljana Plavšić	1996–1998
Mirko Šarović	2000–2002
Dragan Čavić	2002–2006
Prime Minister of Republika Srpska	Years
Branko Đerić	1992–1993
Vladimir Lukić	1993–1994
Dušan Kozić	1994–1995
Rajko Kasagić	1995–1996
Gojko Kličković	1996–1998
Pero Bukejlović	2005–2006
President of Republika Srpska National Assembly	Years
Momčilo Krajišnik	1992–1996
Dragan Kalinić	1996–1998; 2000–2004
Dušan Stojičić	2004–2006
