= National Assembly (Republika Srpska) =

Unicameral legislature of Republika Srpska

National Assembly Народна скупштина Narodna skupština
- 12th legislature

Type
- Type: Unicameral
- Established: 24 October 1991

Leadership
- Speaker: Nenad Stevandić, US since 15 November 2022

Structure
- Seats: 83
- Political groups: Government (56): SNSD (35); US (5); SPS (4); DNS (3) (Note: Members of the united parliamentary club DNS–NPS.); NPS (2); DEMOS (2) (Note: Members of the united parliamentary club SP–DEMOS.); SP (2); RPS (1); Independent (2) (Note: One independent MP is a member of the US parliamentary club, and another of the DNS–NPS parliamentary club.); Opposition (27): PSS (11); SDS (9); ZPR (3); BHZ (1); PDP RS (1); SDA (1); SDP BiH (1)
- Length of term: 4 years

Elections
- Last election: 4 October 2026
- Next election: 6 October 2030

Meeting place
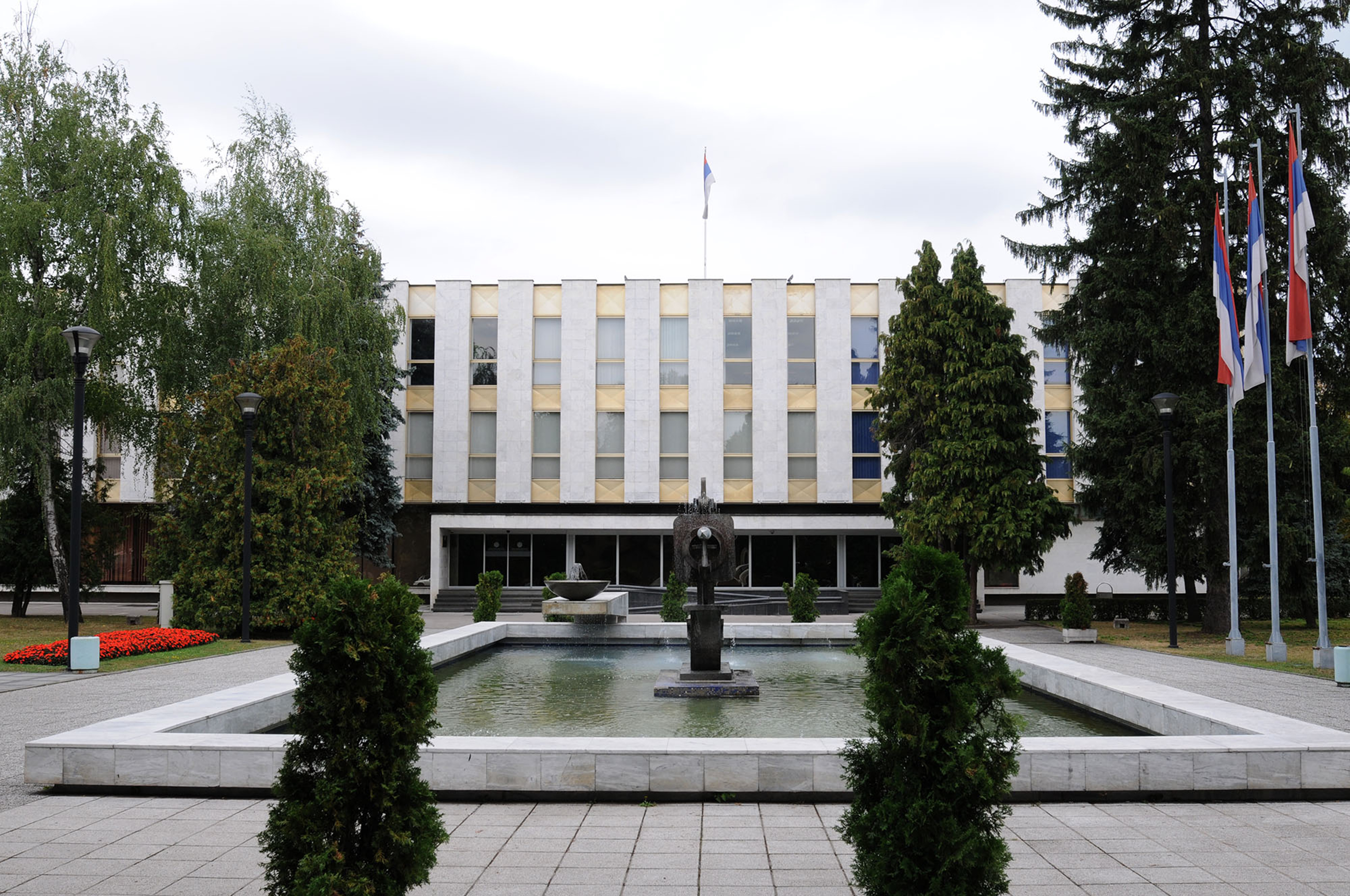
- Dom Narodne Skupštine; 1 Trg Jasenovačkih žrtava Banja Luka

Website
- www.narodnaskupstinars.net

The National Assembly of Republika Srpska (Serbian: Народна скупштина Републике Српске, НСРС; Croatian: Narodna skupština Republike Srpske, NSRS) is the legislative body of Republika Srpska, one of two entities of Bosnia and Herzegovina. The current assembly is the ninth since the entity's founding.

== History ==
The People's Assembly of Republika Srpska was founded on 24 October 1991 as the Assembly of the Serb People of Bosnia and Herzegovina, with its administrative seat in Sarajevo. Due to the Bosnian War, the seat was moved to Pale, where it remained until 1998, when it was moved to Banja Luka, its current location. From 1991 to 1996, the Assembly was composed of Serb representatives elected in 1990 for the Assembly of the Socialist Republic of Bosnia and Herzegovina, most of them members of the Serb Democratic Party (SDS). By the time when the Constitution of Republika Srpska was promulged in February 1992, the Assembly was made of 72 seats for the SDS, 4 for the Union of Reform Forces of Yugoslavia (SRSJ) and one for the Serbian Renewal Movement (SPO). The first parliamentary bloc formally opposed to nationalist forces came into scene in 1994 with the Independent Members of Parliament Caucus (IMPC), a splinter of the SRSJ led by Milorad Dodik.

- First Assembly (24 October 1991 to 14 September 1996)
- Second Assembly (19 October 1996 to 27 December 1997) (election of 4 September 1996)
- Third Assembly (27 December 1997 to 19 October 1998) (election of 14 September 1997)
- Fourth Assembly (19 October 1998 to 16 December 2000) (election of 13 September 1998)
- Fifth Assembly (16 December 2000 to 28 November 2002) (election of 11 September 2000)
- Sixth Assembly (28 November 2002 to 9 November 2006) (election of 5 October 2002)
- Seventh Assembly (9 November 2006 to 15 November 2010) (election of 1 October 2006)
- Eighth Assembly (15 November 2010 to 24 November 2014) (election of 3 October 2010)
- Ninth Assembly (24 November 2014 to 19 November 2018) (election of 12 October 2014)
- Tenth Assembly (19 November 2018 to 15 November 2022) (election of 7 October 2018)
- Eleventh Assembly (15 November 2022 16 November 2026) (election of 2 October 2022)
- Twelfth Assembly (16 November 2026 to present) (election of 4 October 2026)

== Current composition ==
Party	Votes	%	Seats			
Party	Votes	%	Direct	Comp.	Total	+/−
Alliance of Independent Social Democrats	214,609	38.88	27	7	34	+5
Safe Srpska Movement	76,311	13.82	9	3	12	New
Serb Democratic Party	66,104	11.98	9	1	10	-3
Democratic People's Alliance–People's Party of Srpska	30,910	5.60	3	2	5	-2
Socialist Party–Democratic Union–National Democratic Movement	30,549	5.53	4	1	5	-5
United Srpska	28,726	5.20	3	2	5	+1
Socialist Party of Srpska	25,446	4.61	2	2	4	+1
For Justice and Order	24,862	4.50	2	2	4	0
Coalition for the State	18,370	3.33	3	0	3	-2
People's Front	11,964	2.17	0	0	0	New
Republican Party of Srpska	9,088	1.65	1	0	1	New
Will of the People of Srpska	7,033	1.27	0	0	0	New
Party for Bosnia and Herzegovina	2,621	0.47	0	0	0	0
People and Justice	2,374	0.43	0	0	0	New
Croatian Democratic Union and allies (Note: Croatian Democratic Union of Bosnia and Herzegovina; Croatian Peasant Party of Stjepan Radić; Croatian Peasant Party of Bosnia and Herzegovina; Croatian Party of Rights of Bosnia and Herzegovina; Croatian Christian Democratic Union of Bosnia and Herzegovina; Other (HSPAS–HDU–HSPHB–HRAST–HNL))	1,303	0.24	0	0	0	0
Life Party	1,064	0.19	0	0	0	New
Republicans of Bosnia and Herzegovina	381	0.07	0	0	0	New
Croatian Peasant Party	269	0.05	0	0	0	0
Total	551,984	100.00	63	20	83	0
Valid votes	551,984	91.15				
Invalid votes	42,294	6.98				
Blank votes	11,282	1.86				
Total votes	605,560	100.00				
Registered voters/turnout	1,236,597	48.97				
Source: CEC

== See also ==
- List of speakers of the National Assembly of Republika Srpska
