= Anto Babić =

Bosnian historian

- Born: January 3, 1899; Dolac, Austria-Hungary
- Died: January 12, 1974 (aged 75); Sarajevo, Yugoslavia

Academic work
- Notable works: Kancelarija bosanskih vladara; Bosanski heretici; Iz istorije srednjovjekovne Bosne

Anto Babić (3 January 1899, Dolac – 12 January 1974, Sarajevo) was a Bosnian historian, the first dean of the Faculty of Philosophy in Sarajevo, a member of the Academy of Sciences of Bosnia and Herzegovina, SANU, MANU. He was the founder of the Department of History at the Faculty of Philosophy in Sarajevo. He is deemed a doyen of Bosnian and Yugoslav historiography.

== Early life and education ==
He was born in Grahovik, hamlet of Dolac village near Travnik in 1899. He attended primary school in Dolac, high school in Travnik and Sarajevo, where he graduated in 1919. He graduated in history and geography at the Faculty of Philosophy in Zagreb in 1923. He worked as a teacher at a high school in Sušak, Croatia, and a professor at Sarajevo Gymnasium.

== War ==
During the Second World War, he was actively involved in the People's Liberation War, and at the first session of ZAVNOBiH he was elected a member of the Presidency, where he headed the Department of Education in the liberated territory of Bosania and Herzegovina.

He was a Councilor at the Second Session of AVNOJ. He was the Minister of Education of the first government of the People's Republic of Bosnia and Herzegovina for the mandate 1945–1946, Vice President of the Presidium of the National Assembly of the People's Republic of Bosnia and Herzegovina in 1946, a member of the Council of Peoples of the Provisional Assembly, and then the Constituent Assembly of the SFRY.

== Professional career ==
After the war, he worked as a professor at the Higher Pedagogical School in Sarajevo, between 1946 and 1948. In the period 1948–1950, he was the president of the committee for colleges and scientific institutions, and in 1950 he was elected full professor and the first dean of the newly established Faculty of Philosophy in Sarajevo.

He is the founder of the Department of History, where he taught medieval history until 1970. He was the president of the Historical Society of Bosnia and Herzegovina from its founding in 1947 until 1954.

Since 1952 he has been a regular member of the Scientific Society of Bosnia and Herzegovina, and the Academy of Sciences of Bosnia and Herzegovina since its founding in 1966.

Since 1965 he has been a corresponding member of SANU, and since 1972 a corresponding member of the Macedonian Academy of Sciences and Arts.

He was a member of the editorial board and an associate of the Encyclopedia of Yugoslavia 1–6. book, notably leading a section on the Bosnia and Herzegovina separate.

He started and edited (1949–1957) the Yearbook of the Historical Society of Bosnia and Herzegovina.

== Research area ==
In his research, he mostly studied the medieval history of Bosnia, focusing on feudalism in medieval Bosnia and its specifics, the emergence of the medieval Bosnian state and its organization, as well as the Bosnian Church. His research on diplomatic service in medieval Bosnia is still unsurpassed today.

== Writing and publishing ==
He wrote about research area he was focusing on in publications such as:

- Kalendar Napredak (1933),
- Review (1953, 1954, 1961, 1962),
- Yearbook of the Historical Society of Bosnia and Herzegovina (1954, 1964),
- Proceedings of the Scientific Society of Bosnia and Herzegovina (1955, 1960),
- Proceedings of the Faculty of Philosophy in Sarajevo (1964).

He also published articles on archival science in The Herald of Archives and the Archival Association of Bosnia and Herzegovina, in 1961, on historiography in the Yearbook of the Society of Historians of Bosnia and Herzegovina, in 1961, on culture and recent history in Oslobođenje, in 1944, 1946, 1954, in Overview, in 1948, 1972. He contributed to the Memorial to the 75th anniversary of the First Gymnasium in Sarajevo, 1955, Contributions of the Institute for the History of the Workers' Movement, in Sarajevo 1968, Acta historica medicinae, pharmaciae, veterinae, 1971, Proceedings dedicated to the memory of Salko Nazečić, in Sarajevo 1972, The peoples of Bosnia and Herzegovina according to the KPJ and the Revolution, Sarajevo 1972.

== Scientific conferences ==
He participated in scientific conferences in Belgrade in 1954, Trogir i1966, Sarajevo in 1968, 1969, 1970, and abroad in Graz in 1953, Roma in 1955, Stockholm in 1960, Braunschweig in 1964.

== Legacy ==
In Sarajevo, a major avenue in the municipality of Novi Grad that separates the settlement of Alipašino polje from the settlements of Vojničko polje and Nedžarići is named Ante Babića Street.

== Awards ==
He has received numerous recognitions and awards for his work, including Order of Labor with Golden Wreath, in 1959, Order of the Republic with Golden Wreath, in 1970. He received ZAVNOBiH Award in 1973, etc.

== Selected bibliography ==
- Kancelarija bosanskih vladara, Kalendar Napredak, 22, Sarajevo, 1933, 156–160.
- Istorija naroda Jugoslavije. Dio I. Sarajevo 1946. (do 1948. 4 izd.)
- O odnosima vazaliteta u sednjovjekovnoj Bosni, GID BiH 6, Sarajevo, 1954, 29–44.
- O pitanju formiranja srednjovjekovne bosanske države, Radovi ND BiH 3, Sarajevo, 1955, 57–79.
- Diplomatska služba u srednjovjekovnoj Bosni, Radovi ND BiH 5, Sarajevo, 1960, 1-60.
- Bosanski heretici. Sarajevo 1963.
- Iz istorije srednjovjekovne Bosne. Sarajevo 1972.

== See also ==
- Bosnian Church

== Bibliography ==
- Kurtović, Esad (2000). Anto Babić (1899-1999), Povodom stogodišnjice rođenja [Anto Babić (1899–1999), On the occasion of the centenary of his birth] (in Bosnian). Sarajevo: Bosna franciscana VIII/13. pp. 241–258.
- Šunjić, Marko (1973). Anto Babić (in Serbo-Croatian). Sarajevo: Godišnjak Istoriskog društva BiH, 20 (1972–73). pp. 11–15.
- Šunjić, Marko (1984). Podsticajna naučna ličnost (Povodom 10-godišnjice smrti akademika Ante Babića) [Stimulating scientific personality (On the occasion of the 10th anniversary of the death of academician Ante Babić)] (in Serbo-Croatian). Sarajevo: Oslobođenje 46/12772 (12 January 1984). p. 8.
- Ćirković, Sima (1974). Anto Babić (3. januar 1899 - 12. januar 1974) [Anto Babić (3 January 1899 – 12 January 1974)] (in Serbian). Godišnjak SANU, knj. LXXXI, Beograd, 1976. pp. 243–245.
- Ćirković, Sima (1972). "Srednjovekovna Bosna u delu Ante Babića" (Anto Babić, Iz istorije srednjovjekovne Bosne, Svjetlost, Sarajevo, 1972) [“Medieval Bosnia in the work of Anto Babić” (Anto Babić, From the history of medieval Bosnia)] (in Serbian). "Svjetlost" Sarajevo. pp. 5–8. OCLC 427873031.
- Kovačević-Kojić, Desanka (1974). Anto Babić – In memoriam (in Serbo-Croatian). Istorijski glasnik Društva istoricara Srbije, 1974, 1/2. pp. 179–180.
- Ćemerlić, Hamdija (1975). Anto Babić (in Serbo-Croatian). Ljetopis Akademije nauka i umjetnosti BiH, 1975, 7. pp. 97–99.
- Ćemerlić, Hamdija (2004). Anto Babić (in Bosnian). Ljetopis Akademije nauka i umjetnosti BiH ANUBiH.
- Spomenica 60. godišnjice Filozofskog fakulteta u Sarajevu (1950–2010) [Commemoration of the 60th anniversary of the Faculty of Philosophy in Sarajevo (1950–2010)] (in Bosnian). Filozofski fakultet. 2010. pp. 116–117.
