= Academy of Sciences and Arts of the Republika Srpska =

National academy of Serbia

Academy of Sciences and Arts of Republika Srpska (Академија наука и умјетности Републике Српске)
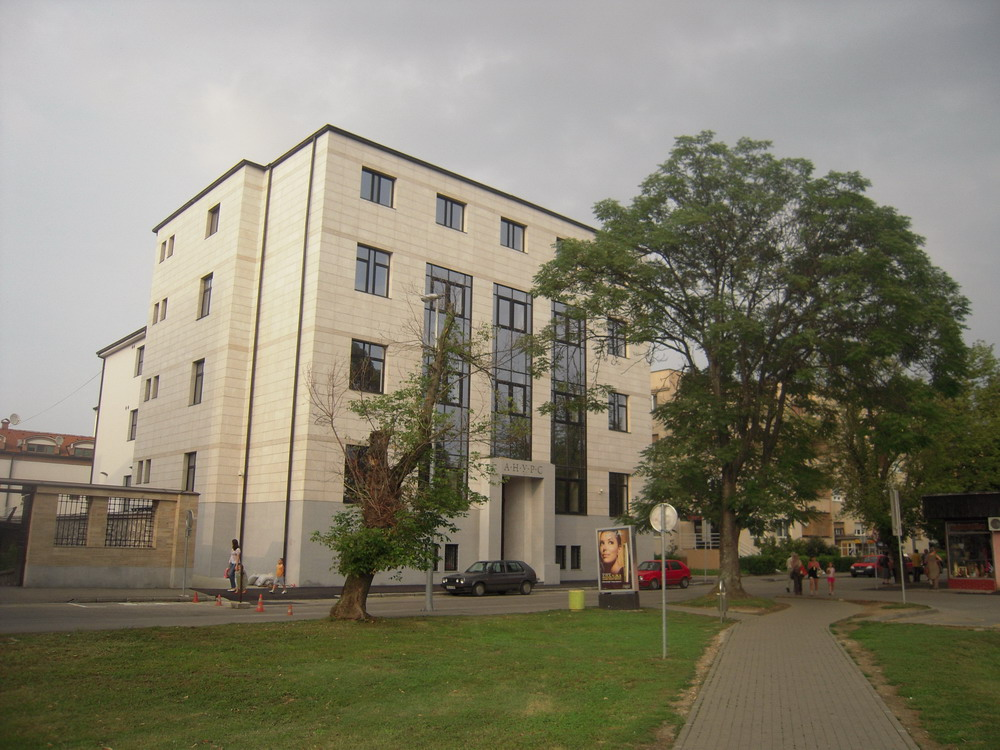
- Building of the Academy.
- Abbreviation: АНУРС; ANURS
- Formation: 1996 in Banja Luka
- Type: National academy
- Purpose: Science, arts, academics
- Headquarters: Banja Luka, Republika Srpska, Bosnia and Herzegovina
- Location: Trg Srpskih Vladara II (Square of Serb Rulers II) Coordinates: 44°46'20"N 17°11'37"E
- President: Rajko Kuzmanović
- Main organ: Presidency of the Academy
- Website: www.anurs.org

The Academy of Sciences and Arts of the Republika Srpska (Serbo-Croatian: Академија наука и умјетности Републике Српске, АНУРС / Akademija nauka i umjetnosti Republike Srpske, ANURS) is highest representative institution in the Republika Srpska of science and art founded in 1996. It has four departments – Department of Social Sciences, Department of Literature and Arts, Department of Natural, Mathematical and Technical Sciences and the Department of Medical Sciences. It is based in Banja Luka.

== List of presidents ==
Name	Period
Petar Mandić	1996–1999
Slavko Leovac	2000
Veselin Perić	2000–2003
Milan Vasić	2003
Rajko Kuzmanović	2004–Present

== Members ==
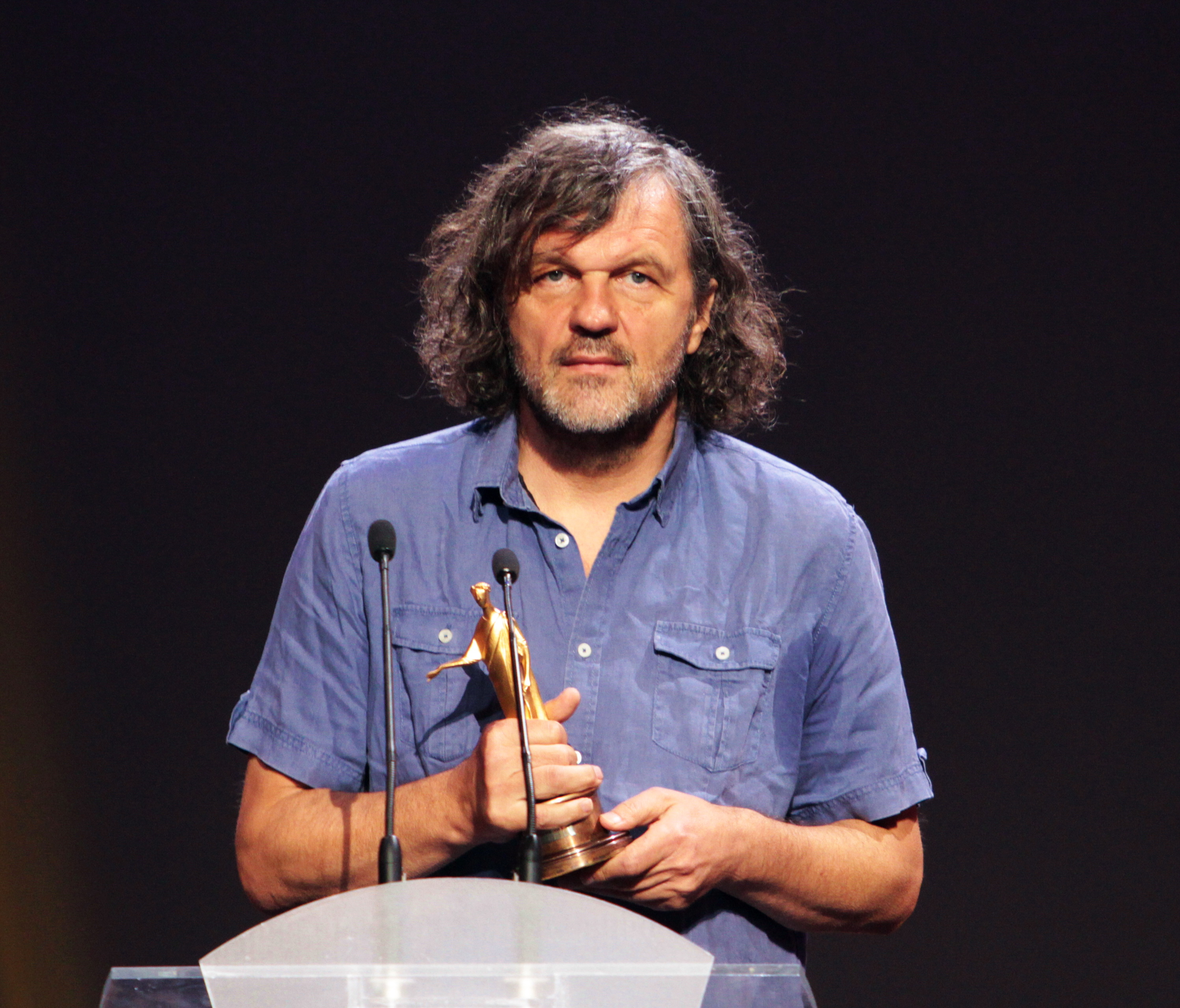
Film director and writer Emir Kusturica, member of the Academy, since 2011

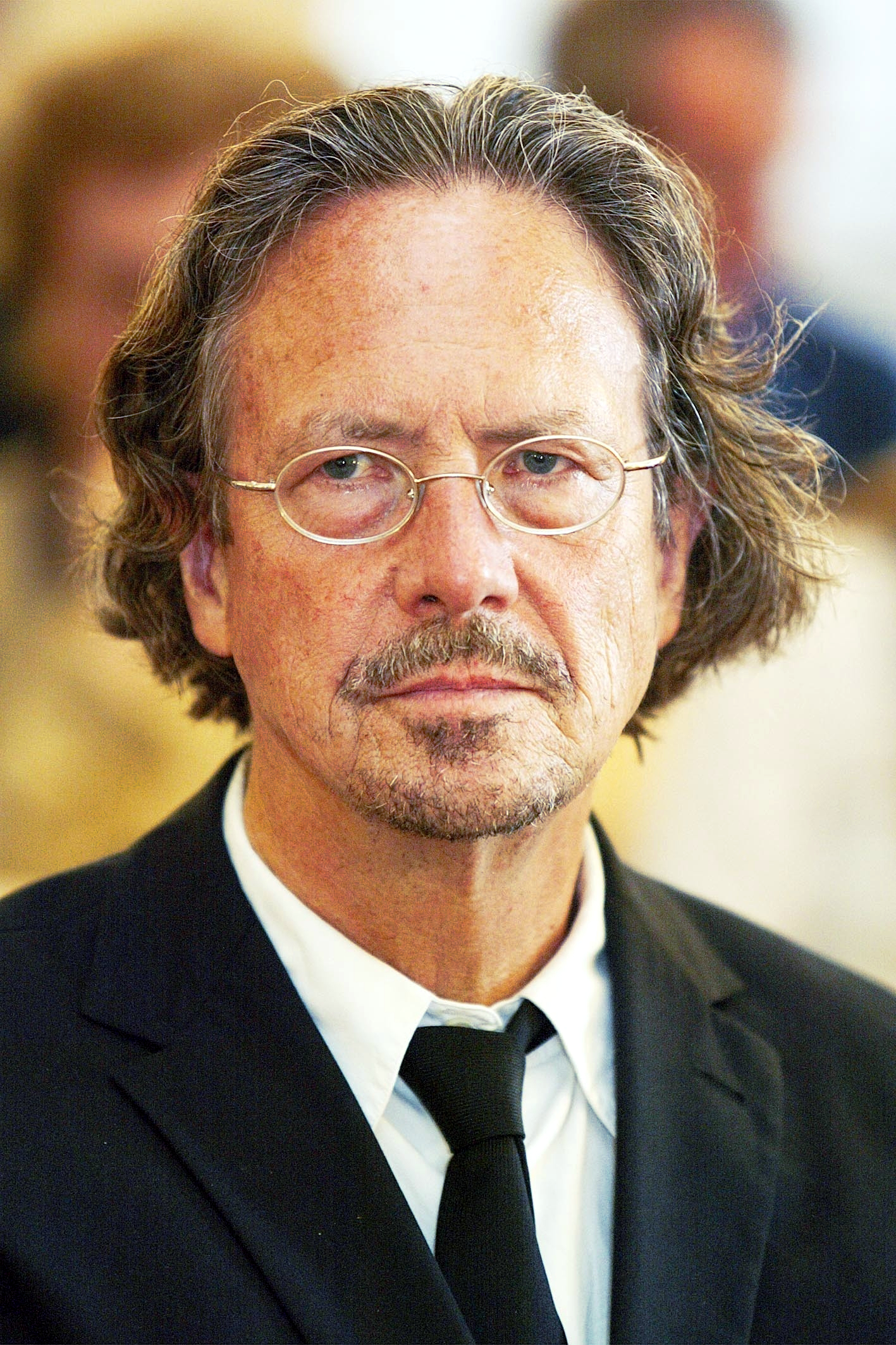
Writer Peter Handke, member of the Academy, since 2008

Some prominent members of the Academy are:

- Aleksa Buha
- Gojko Đogo
- Milorad Ekmečić
- Elena Guskova
- Peter Handke
- Momo Kapor
- Svetozar Koljević
- Desanka Kovačević-Kojić
- Emir Kusturica
- Rade Mihaljčić
- Rajko Petrov Nogo
- Darko Tanasković
- Milan Vasić

== See also ==
- Academy of Sciences and Arts of Bosnia and Herzegovina
- Bosniak Academy of Sciences and Arts
- Culture of Republika Srpska
- Serbian Academy of Sciences and Arts
