= Rajko Petrov Nogo =

Serbian poet and literary critic (1945–2022)

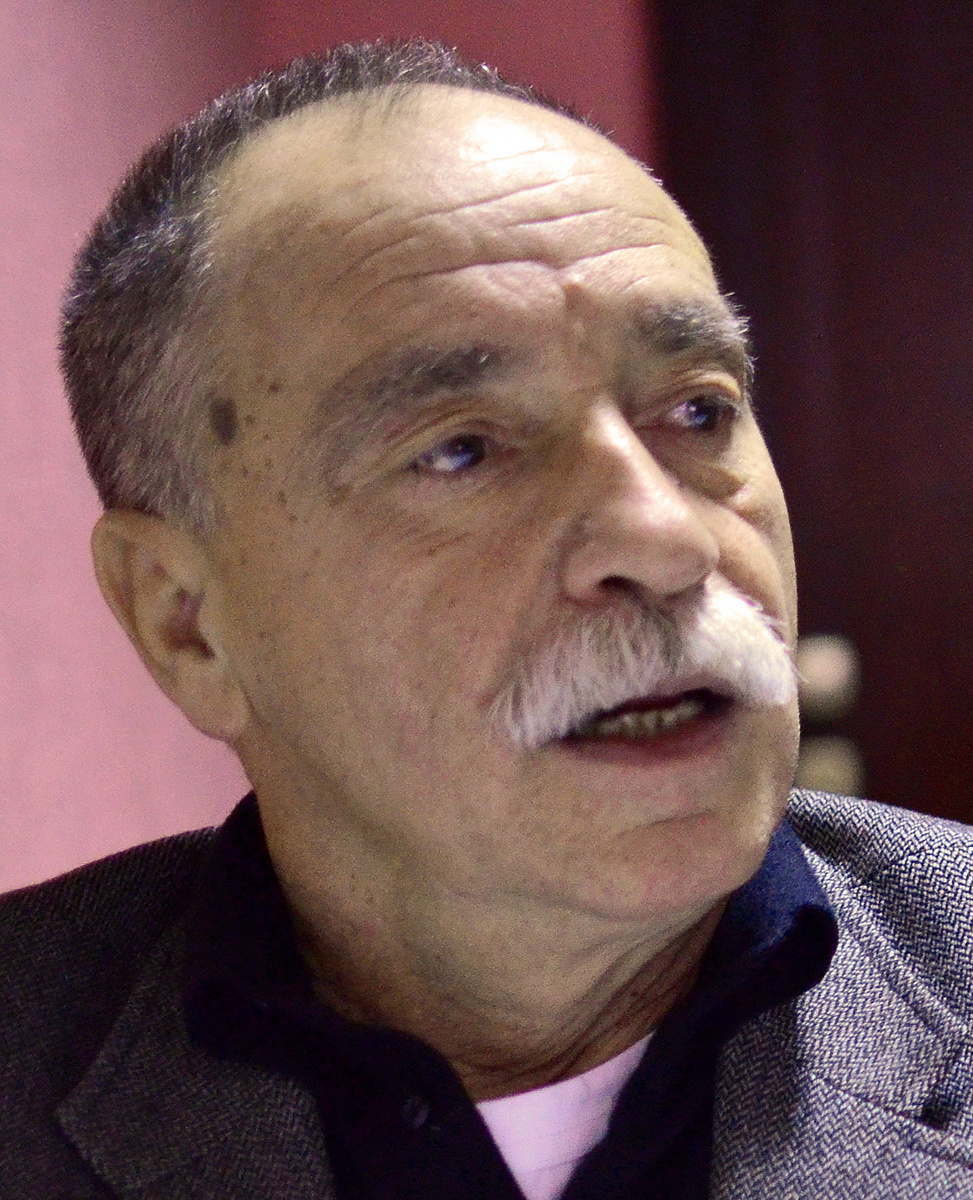
- Nogo in 2011
- Born: Rajko Nogo; 13 May 1945; Borija, Bosnia and Herzegovina, Yugoslavia
- Died: 28 November 2022 (aged 77); Belgrade, Serbia
- Occupations: Poet, literary critic

Rajko Petrov Nogo (Serbian Cyrillic: Рајко Петров Ного; 13 May 1945 – 28 November 2022) was a Serbian poet, essayist and literary critic.

== Biography ==
Nogo was born on 13 May 1945, after the end of the Second World War to parents Petar and Stana, in Borija near Kalinovik (in the old Herzegovina region of Zagorje) into a family descending from the Kuči tribe in Montenegro. From his father's name, he derived the patronymic Petrov, which he added to his name.

As a boy, he moved from his native Borija to Sarajevo and began his education there. After elementary school, he graduated from the Teaching School in Sarajevo and earned a degree in Yugoslav literature and Serbo-Croatian language at the University of Sarajevo Faculty of Philosophy. He later received his master's degree at the University of Belgrade Faculty of Philology. He worked as an editor in the Veselin Masleša Publishing Company from 1972 to 1982, then as an editor in Belgrade's BIGZ publishing house from 1982 to 1999.

Nogo moved from Sarajevo to Belgrade in 1982.

From 2000, he taught poetry and literary criticism at the Faculty of Philosophy of the University of East Sarajevo. He was elected a corresponding member of the Academy of Sciences and Arts of the Republic of Srpska on 27 June 1997, and a regular member on 21 June 2004. He was a member of the Association of Writers of Serbia. On 30 March 2012, the Board of Directors of the Association of Writers of Serbia proposed him as a corresponding member of the Serbian Academy of Sciences and Arts.

Nogo died on 28 November 2022, at the age of 77.
