= Mining and metallurgy in medieval Europe =

Medieval European history

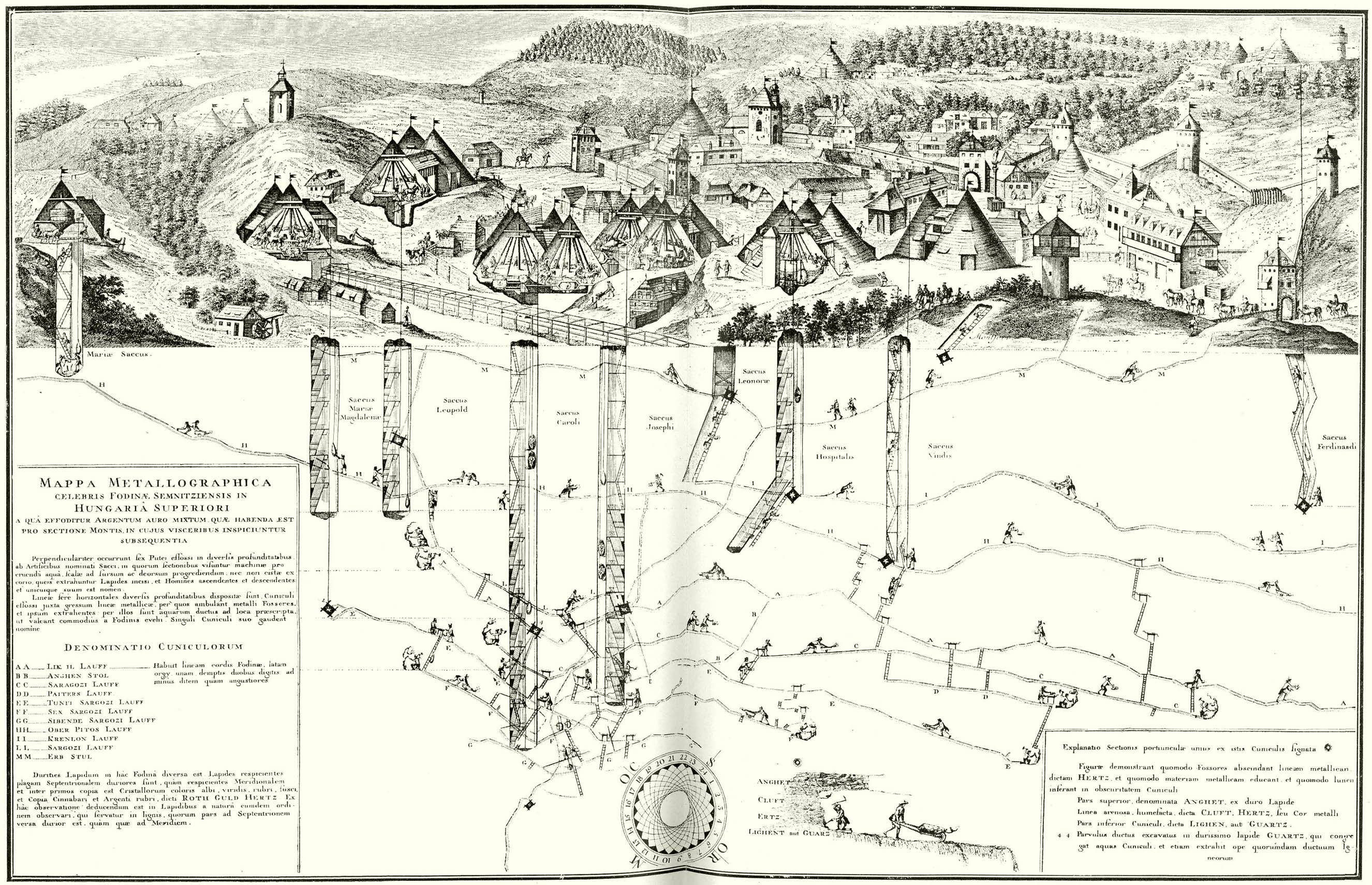
Plan of mines in Banská Štiavnica in Slovakia (1726) by Luigi Ferdinando Marsigli, an illustration of mining in the pre-modern era.

During the Middle Ages, between the 5th and 16th century AD, Western Europe saw a period of growth in the mining industry. The first important mines were those at Goslar in the Harz mountains, taken into commission in the 10th century. Another notable mining town is Falun in Sweden where copper has been mined since at least the 10th century and possibly even earlier. (Olsson 2010)

The rise of the Western European mining industry depended on the increasing influence of Western Europe on the world stage. Advances in medieval mining and metallurgy enabled the flourishing of Western European civilization. Accessible ores and improved extraction techniques supported economic growth and trade. Innovations like water-powered machinery and better smelting methods increased the productivity and quality of metals.

Metallurgical activities were also encouraged by the central political powers, regional authorities, monastic orders, and ecclesiastical overlords. These powers attempted to claim royal rights over the mines and a share in the output, both on private lands and regions belonging to The Crown. They were particularly interested in the extraction of the precious metal ores, and for this reason, the mines in their territories were open to all miners (Nef 1987, 706–715).

== Early Middle Ages, 500–1000 ==
The social, political, and economic stagnation that followed the Roman Empire affected Europe throughout the early medieval period and had a critical impact on technological progress, trade, and social organization. Technological developments that affected the course of metal production were only feasible within a stable political environment, and this was not the case until the 9th century (Martinon-Torres & Rehren in press, a).

During the first medieval centuries, the output of metal was in a steady decline with constraints in small-scale activities. Miners adopted methods much less efficient than those of Roman times. Ores were extracted only from shallow depths or from remnants of formerly abandoned mines. The vicinity of the mine to villages or towns was also a determining factor when due to the high cost of material transportation (Martinon-Torres & Rehren in press, b). Only the output of iron diminished less in relation to the other base and precious metals until the 8th century. This fact, correlated with the dramatic decrease in copper production, may indicate a possible displacement of copper and bronze artifacts by iron ones (Forbes 1957, 64; Bayley et al. 2008, 50).

By the end of the 9th century, economic, and social conditions dictated a greater need for metal for agriculture, arms, stirrups, and decoration. Consequently, conditions began to favor metallurgy and a slow but steady general progress developed. Starting from the reign of the emperor Otto I in the 960s, smelting sites were multiplied. New mines were discovered and exploited, like the well-known Mines of Rammelsberg, close to the town of Goslar in the Harz Mountains. Open-cast mining and metallurgical activities were mostly concentrated in the Eastern Alps, Saxony, Bohemia, Tuscany, Rhineland, Gaul, and Spain (Nef 1987). It was mainly German miners and metallurgists who were the generators of metal production, but the French and Flemish made contributions to the developments.

== High Middle Ages, 11th to 13th centuries ==
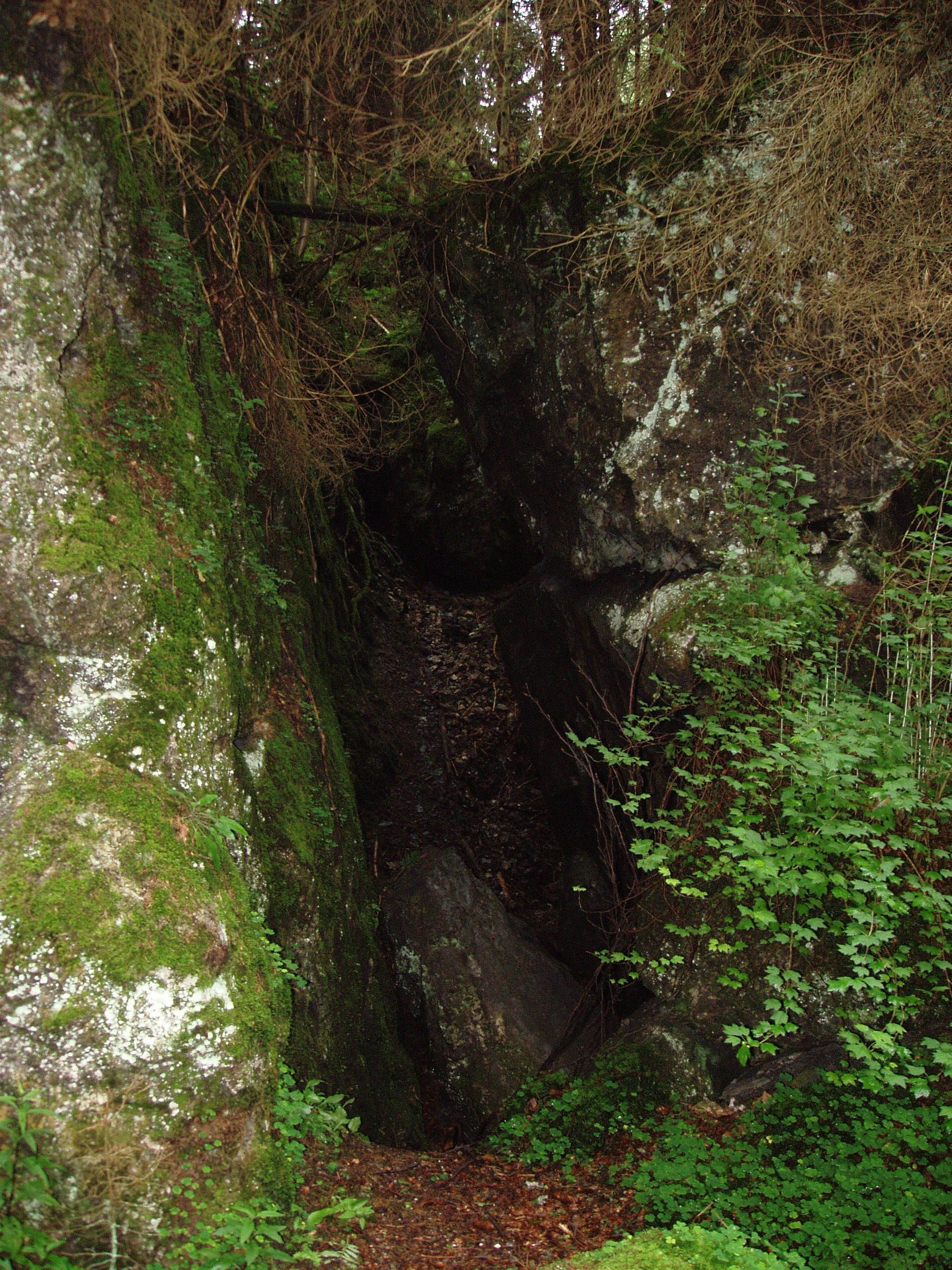
Medieval mine on the Bockswieser Gangzug north of Oberschulenberg in Germany.

The period immediately after the 10th century marked the widespread application of several innovations in the field of mining and ore treatment: a shift to large-scale and better quality production. Medieval miners and metallurgists had to find solutions for the practical problems that limited former metal production, in order to meet the market demands for metals. This increased demand for metal was due to the population growth from the 11th to the 13th centuries. This growth had an impact on agriculture, trade, and building construction, including Gothic churches.

The main problem was the inefficient means for draining water out of shafts and tunnels in underground mining. This resulted in the flooding of mines which limited the extraction of ore to shallow depths close to the surface. The secondary problem was the separation of the metal-bearing minerals from the worthless material that surrounds it, or is closely mixed with it. There was, additionally, the difficulty of transporting the ore, which resulted in subsequently high costs.

The economic value of mining led to investment in the development of solutions to these problems, which had a distinctly positive impact on medieval metal output. This included innovations such as water power using waterwheels for powering draining engines, bellows, hammers, and the introduction of advanced types of furnaces.

These innovations were not adopted all at once or applied to all mines and smelting sites. Throughout the medieval period, these technical innovations, and traditional techniques coexisted. Their application depended on the time period and geographical region. Water power in medieval mining and metallurgy was introduced well before the 11th century, but it was only in the 11th century that it was widely applied. The introduction of the blast furnace, mostly for iron smelting, in all the established centers of metallurgy contributed to the quantitative and qualitative improvement of the metal output, making metallic iron available at a lower price.

In addition, cupellation, developed in the 8th century, was more often used for the refinement of lead-silver ores, to separate the silver from the lead (Bayley 2008). Parallel production with more than one technical method, and different treatment of ores would occur wherever multiple ores were present at one site. (Rehren et al. 1999).

Underground work in shafts, although limited in depth, was accomplished either by fire-setting for massive ore bodies or with iron tools for smaller scale extraction of limited veins. The sorting of base and precious metal ores was completed underground and they were transferred separately (Martinon-Torres & Rehren in press, b).

Permanent mining in Sweden proper begun in the High Middle Ages and did not spread to Finland until 1530 when the first iron mine began operations there.

== Late Middle Ages, 14th to 16th centuries ==
Beschreibung allerfürnemisten mineralischen Ertzt unnd Bergkwercks Arten (Description of most distinguished kinds of mineral ores and mines) by Lazarus Ercker, 1580

By the 14th century, the majority of the more easily accessible ore deposits were exhausted. Thus, more advanced technological achievements were introduced in order to keep up with the demand in metal. The alchemical laboratory, separating precious metals from the baser ones they are typically found with, was an essential feature of the metallurgical enterprise.

A significant hiatus in underground mining was noted during the 14th and the early 15th century due to a series of historical events with severe social and economic impacts. The Great Famine (1315–1317), the Black Death (1347–1353), which diminished the European population by one third to one half, and the Hundred Years War (1337–1453) between England and France, that, amongst others, caused severe deforestation, and had dramatic influences in metallurgical industry and trade.

Lead mining, for example, ground to a halt due to the Black Death pandemic, when atmospheric lead pollution from smelting dropped to natural levels (zero) for the first and only time in the last 2000 years. The great demand of metals, e.g. for armor, could not be met due to the lack of manpower and capital investment.

It was only by the end of the 13th century that great capital expenditures were invested and more sophisticated machinery was installed in underground mining, which resulted in reaching greater depths. The wider application of water and horse power was necessary for draining water out of these deep shafts. Also, acid parting in separating gold from silver was introduced in the 14th century (Bayley 2008). Signs of recovery were present only after the mid 15th century, when the improved methods were widely adopted (Nef 1987, 723).

From the mid-fifteenth century, mining revived in parts of Central Europe, especially in Saxony, Bohemia, the Harz, and the Tyrol. Deeper mines required more expensive drainage, hoisting, and ore-processing works, encouraging larger capital investment and new forms of organization. In the same period, a form of liquation, the Saiger process, became an important method for separating silver from argentiferous copper, especially in German and Central European mining regions.

The sixteenth century saw the publication of major technical works on mining and metallurgy, most notably Georgius Agricola's De re metallica, published posthumously in 1556, which became a leading textbook for miners and metallurgists for nearly two centuries.

The discovery of the New World had an impact on European metal production and trade, which has affected the world economy ever since. New, rich ore deposits found in Central Europe during the 15th century were dwarfed by the large amounts of precious metal imports from the Americas.

== Smiths and miners within medieval society ==
Metallurgists throughout medieval Europe were generally free to move within different regions. For instance, German metallurgists in search of rich precious metal ores took the lead in mining and influenced the course of metal production, not only in East and South Germany but also in almost all of Central Europe and the Eastern Alps.

As mining gradually became a task for specialized craftsmen, miners moved in large groups and formed settlements close to mines, each with their own customs. They were always welcomed by regional authorities, as the latter were interested in increasing revenue through the profitable exploitation of the mineral-rich subsurface. These authorities claimed a portion of the output, and smiths and miners were provided with land for cottages, mills, forges, farming, and pasture, while also being allowed to utilize streams and lumber. (Nef 1987, 706–715).

Advancing into the high and late Middle Ages, a notable shift occurred where smelting sites gained geographical independence from mines, leading to the separation of metalworking from ore smelting. The urban expansion that unfolded from the 10th century onwards, coupled with the pivotal influence of towns, afforded metallurgists an optimal setting to cultivate and refine their technological advancements. This era witnessed the systematic formation of metallurgical guilds, with their workshops often converging on the outskirts of these urban centers. (McLees 1996).

In medieval societies, liberal and mechanical arts were considered to be totally different disciplines. Metallurgists, like all craftsmen and artisans, almost always lacked the formal education that would inform a methodical intellectual background. Instead, they were the pioneers of causal thinking based on empirical observation and experimentation (Zilsel 2000).

== See also ==
- Great Bullion Famine
- Mining in the Upper Harz
- Mining Law (1412)

== Sources ==
- Agricola, Georgius, 1556, Translation Hoover, Herbert, 1912, De re metallica, Farlang, full streaming version + scientific introduction
- Bayley, J. (1996). "Innovation in later medieval urban metalworking". Historical Metallurgy. 30 (2): 67–71.
- Bayley, Justine (2008). "Medieval Precious Metal Refining: Archaeology and Contemporary Texts Compared". In Martinon-Torres, Marcos; Rehren, Thilo (eds.). Archaeology, History and Science: Integrating Approaches to Ancient Materials. Walnut Creek: Left Coast Press. pp. 131–150. ISBN 978-1-59874-340-1.
- Bayley, J.; Crossley, D.; Ponting, M., eds. (2008). Metals and Metalworking: A research framework for Archaeometallurgy. Occasional Publication. Historical Metallurgy Society. pp. 49–64.
- Craddock, P. T., 1989. Metalworking Techniques. In: Youngs, S. (ed), Work of Angels: Masterpieces of Celtic Metalwork, 6th-9th centuries AD, 170–213.
- Forbes, R. J., 1957. Metallurgy. In: Singer, C., Holmyard, E. J., Hall, A. R. & Williams, T. I. (eds), A History of Technology, vol. 2: The Mediterranean Civilizations and the Middle Ages c. 700 BC to AD 1500. Oxford: Clarendon Press, 41–80.
- Keene, D. (1996). "Metalworking in Medieval London: an Historical Survey". Historical Metallurgy. 30 (2): 95–102.
- Kovačević-Kojić, Desanka (2014). "On the Composition and Processing of Precious Metals mined in Medieval Serbia" (PDF). Balcanica (45): 97–106. doi:10.2298/BALC1445097K.
- Martinon-Torres, M. & Rehren, Th., in press (a). Metallurgy, Europe. In: Encyclopedia of Society and Culture in the Medieval World. Dallas: Schlager.
- Martinon-Torres, M. & Rehren, Th., in press (b). Mining, Europe. In: Encyclopedia of Society and Culture in the Medieval World. Dallas: Schlager.
- McLees, C. (1996). "Itinerant craftsmen, permanent smithies and the archbishop's mint: the character and context of metalworking in medieval Trondheim". Historical Metallurgy. 30 (2): 121–135.
- Nef, John U. (1987). "Mining and Metallurgy in Medieval Civilisation". In Postan, Michael Moïssey; Miller, Edward; Postan, Cynthia (eds.). The Cambridge Economic History of Europe from the Decline of the Roman Empire. Vol. 2 – Trade and Industry in the Middle Ages (2nd ed.). Cambridge: Cambridge University Press. pp. 693–761. doi:10.1017/CHOL9780521087094.012. ISBN 9781139054430. S2CID 127621894.
- Rehren, T.; Schneider, J.; Bartels, C. (1999). "Medieval lead-silver smelting in the Siegerland, West Germany". Historical Metallurgy. 33 (2): 73–84.
- Smith, C.S. & Hawthorne, J.H., 1974. Mappae Clavicula, A little key to the world of medieval techniques. Transactions of American Philosophical Society 64 (4), 1–128.
- Theophilus, On Divers Arts: The foremost medieval treatise on Painting, Glassmaking and Metalwork. Hawthorne, J.G. & Smith, C.S. (trans), 1979. New York: Dover Publications.
- Zilsel, Edgar (2000). "The Sociological Roots of Science". Social Studies of Science. 30 (6): 935–949. doi:10.1177/030631200030006006.
- Olsson, Daniels Sven (2010). Falu Gruva. Falun: Stiftelsen Stora Kopparberget. pp. 10–11. ISBN 9789185315024.
