= Milorad Ekmečić =

Yugoslav and Serbian historian (1928–2015)

- Милорад Екмечић
- Milorad Ekmečić
- Born: 4 October 1928; Prebilovci, Kingdom of Serbs, Croats and Slovenes
- Died: 29 August 2015 (aged 86); Belgrade, Serbia
- Occupation: Historian
- Years active: 1952–1994
- Known for: contributions to Yugoslav history
- Title: Professor

Academic background
- Thesis: The uprising in Bosnia from 1875 to 1878 (1958)

Academic work
- Institutions: Faculty of Philosophy, University of Sarajevo; Faculty of Philosophy, University of Belgrade
- Notable works: History of Yugoslavia (1974); Stvaranje Jugoslavije 1790–1918 [Creation of Yugoslavia 1790–1918] (1989)

Milorad Ekmečić (Serbo-Croatian Cyrillic: Милорад Екмечић; 4 October 1928 – 29 August 2015) was a Yugoslav and Serbian historian. During World War II he became a member of the Yugoslav Partisans after the fascist Ustaše perpetrated the Prebilovci massacre, in which 78 members of his family were killed, including his father. He studied at the University of Zagreb and went on to be a professor at the University of Sarajevo, and later at the University of Belgrade. He was a member of several Yugoslav academies of sciences and arts, the author of more than a dozen historical books, and received several significant national awards. Ekmečić authored several important works in socialist Yugoslavia, including his contribution to the book History of Yugoslavia published in English in 1974, and Stvaranje Jugoslavije 1790–1918 [Creation of Yugoslavia 1790–1918] in 1989. According to his obituary in Vreme news magazine, Ekmečić was considered "a prominent representative of Serbian critical historiography".

Accused of Serbian nationalist views since the 1970s, he espoused them particularly during the breakup of Yugoslavia, when he served as an advisor to Radovan Karadžić – later convicted as a war criminal – when Karadžić was president of Republika Srpska during the 1992–1995 Bosnian War, and was a founder of Karadžić's radical nationalist Serb Democratic Party in Bosnia and Herzegovina. He was active in the revisionist wave of Serbian historiography from 1991. This involved local historians eschewing the standards of international scholarship and concentrating exclusively on sectarian myths, resulting in the production of what has been described in historiographical assessment of the period as "pseudohistory". Ekmečić added a religious flavour to this by claiming that the Vatican was an enemy of the Serbian nation, and also that it posed the biggest obstacle to Yugoslav unification in 1918. An analysis of Serbian historiography since 1991 concluded that Ekmečić was "complicit in the weaponisation of history, in particular that of the mass atrocities of the Second World War".

== Early life ==
Milorad Ekmečić was born on 4 October 1928 in Prebilovci near Čapljina in the Kingdom of Serbs, Croats and Slovenes (modern-day Bosnia and Herzegovina) to Ilija and Kristina Ekmečić. He attended elementary school in Čapljina, and high school in Mostar.

When the Kingdom of Yugoslavia entered World War II due to the Axis invasion of the country in April 1941, Ekmečić remained in the Čapljina area until 1943. During the invasion, the Independent State of Croatia, a fascist puppet state, was established; the new state encompassed Čapljina. On 6 August 1941, the ruling Ustaše perpetrated the Prebilovci massacre, in which Ekmečić lost 78 members of his family, including his father and uncle. The surviving members of his family formed a unit of the Yugoslav Partisans resistance movement in Prebilovci. From October 1944 until July 1945, Ekmečić was a member of the Yugoslav Partisans.

== Career ==
After completing high school in 1947, Ekmečić enrolled in general history undergraduate study at the University of Zagreb, from which he graduated in 1952. In the same year he took up an assistant position at the Faculty of Philosophy, University of Sarajevo. Ekmečić conducted research in archives in Zagreb, Belgrade, Zadar, and Vienna in Austria. He received his doctorate in history from the University of Zagreb in 1958 upon defending his dissertation entitled The uprising in Bosnia from 1875 to 1878, which has been published in three editions and translated into German. He visited Princeton University, New Jersey, in 1961, and then continued his academic career as a professor of history at the University of Sarajevo where he worked as a full professor from 1968 until 1992 teaching "General History of the New Age" and "Introduction to the Science of History" courses. During this time he also spent some time as a visiting professor at the University of Michigan in Ann Arbor, Michigan.

During the time of socialist Yugoslavia, Ekmečić authored several important works. According to his obituary in Vreme news magazine, Ekmečić was considered "a prominent representative of Serbian critical historiography".

Along with Vladimir Dedijer, Ivan Božić and Sima Ćirković, he co-authored History of Yugoslavia published in English in 1974, having already appeared in Serbo-Croatian in 1972. Croatian-American historian Gerald G. Govorchin hailed the book as "one of the most comprehensive histories of Yugoslavia in the English language", despite a tendency towards Marxist historiography and the absence of a detailed examination of the post-World War II period. In this book, Ekmečić drew upon nineteenth-century developments to challenge the decentralists within Yugoslav historiographical thought who supported the separate national entities of the South Slavic nations. Instead, Ekmečić asserted that unitarian assimilation was to be preferred, saying that nationhood based on language was the only concept which was acceptable from both a rationalist and romanticist perspective. He also concluded that religion was to blame for the push towards decentralisation. According to the Croatian-American historian Ivo Banac, Ekmečić's approach betrayed a double-standard, whereby he criticised only non-Serb South Slavic nationalism. In the late 1970s, Serbian-American historian Michael B. Petrovich described the controversy in Yugoslav historiography that was significantly impacted by History of Yugoslavia, saying the chapters in the book authored by Ekmečić were the ones that were the most badly received among the other Yugoslav historians, including Jaroslav Šidak, Mirjana Gross, Avdo Sućeska, Mustafa Imamović, Petar Strčić and others. While they were all affected by the nationalist upheavals at the time, they also pointed out numerous historiographic issues with Ekmečić's work. That conflict caused widespread resentment and distrust between these Yugoslav historians. Croatian-Italian historian Egidio Ivetić later described Ekmečić's attempt to create a Yugoslav transnational historical narrative as an interesting part of Yugoslav cultural phenomenology, even if its value was disputable.

In 1989, Ekmečić published Stvaranje Jugoslavije 1790–1918 [Creation of Yugoslavia 1790–1918]. According to the historian Jasna Dragović-Soso, in this book Ekmečić advanced the idea that Serbian national ideology was the "main integrative and pro-Yugoslav force", and blamed what he claimed was an "inherently obstructionist Croatian national ideology", based partly on "virulently anti-Serb Catholicism", for Yugoslavia's problems and its ultimate disintegration. This construction was also criticised by Banac, who asserted that "religion played virtually no part" in the development of Croatian national ideology. The Serbian historian Bojan Aleksov points out that Ekmečić suggested that the Serbian Orthodox Church had consistently maintained and protected a separate identity for Serbs, and for this reason their susceptibility to alternative formulations of nationhood was low, especially in the nineteenth century.

Shortly after the outbreak of the Bosnian War in 1992, Ekmečić was arrested by the Bosnia and Herzegovina government-loyalist Green Berets paramilitary unit along with his family. Initially held at the elementary school in Vratnik, he was then transferred to house arrest, from which he managed to flee to the Bosnian Serb-controlled proto-state known as the Republika Srpska. From 1992 to 1994 Ekmečić worked as a full professor at the Faculty of Philosophy, University of Belgrade. He retired on 1 October 1994.

Ekmečić was a member of the Serbian Academy of Sciences and Arts (SANU) from 1978, and a member of its presidency from 2004, and served on five of its specialist committees. He was also a member of the Academy of Sciences and Arts of Bosnia and Herzegovina from 1973, the Montenegrin Academy of Sciences and Arts from 1993, and the Academy of Sciences and Arts of the Republika Srpska from 1996. During his career he received the prestigious "27th July Award of Bosnia and Herzegovina for Science" in 1963, the Yugoslav Order of Labour with Golden Wreath in 1965, the "Enlightenment Award" in 1972, the NIN Award in 1990 for Stvaranje Jugoslavije 1790–1918 [Creation of Yugoslavia 1790–1918], and the Order of St. Sava First Class from the Serbian Orthodox Church, among others. In 2010, he was decorated with the Order of Honor with Golden Rays by Republika Srpska.

Ekmečić was a member of the Senate of Republika Srpska. He died after a short illness at a hospital in Belgrade on 29 August 2015 at the age of 86, and was buried in the Alley of Distinguished Citizens at the Belgrade New Cemetery. In February 2019, the president of Serbia, Aleksandar Vučić, proposed that a street in Belgrade be named after Ekmečić, and this was carried out a month later. In October 2022, Ekmečić's collected works were launched, and Vučić praised Ekmečić, stating that his books should be in every Serb's home.

== Nationalism and revisionism ==
During the Bosnian War, Ekmečić was an advisor to the president of Republika Srpska, Radovan Karadžić, who was later convicted of genocide, crimes against humanity and war crimes by the International Criminal Tribunal for the former Yugoslavia (ICTY). As part of his connection to Karadžić, Ekmečić was also a founder of the radical nationalist Serb Democratic Party (SDS) in Bosnia and Herzegovina in 1990, and was one of three academics from the University of Sarajevo who were offered the leadership of the SDS but declined. In a book published by the Serbian politician and academic Uroš Šuvaković in 2011, Ekmečić was quoted as saying that he was "not eager to be a member of the Serb Democratic Party, [but] was in the closest circle in which it was conceived". In the same book, Ekmečić is quoted as stating that "Serbs in Bosnia and Herzegovina are now a religious minority in a foreign country. As in 1914, Serbia is for us the only guarantor of our freedom, and Belgrade remains our capital". Ekmečić was also one of the main ideologues of the SDS.

The historian David Bruce MacDonald has highlighted that Ekmečić was one of many Yugoslav academics that "went national" during the breakup of Yugoslavia, changing his views considerably from his earlier days as a unitarian, and this is reinforced by the scholar Igor Štiks who described Ekmečić as a "leading Serb nationalist historian", and the academic Aleksandar Pavković who asserts that Ekmečić adopted a "rather non-rationalist version of Serbism". In the early 1990s Ekmečić spoke about "German Europe", which he said was dominated by an "invasion of clericalism", while in 1992 he claimed that the war in Bosnia and Herzegovina was a "new Serbian struggle" and a continuation of the "work that the Serbs began in 1804 by expelling the Turks from Serbia". Later he claimed that the concept of a Bosniak people was an artificial construct created by Americans. According to the Serbian historian Olivera Milosavljević, Ekmečić believed that the Serbian nation "must unite to a higher degree than it is now. The rest of Yugoslavia, which would add Serbian parts from Croatia, as a separate body, is one of the closest solutions".

Ekmečić took part in the negotiations of the party with the multi-ethnic, non-nationalist Social Democratic Party (SDP) in the early 1990s. Ivo Komšić was a member of the collective leadership of the SDP and a member of the delegation in the negotiations with the SDS. He recalled that during the negotiations, Ekmečić described the plan of the SDS regarding the formation of a single Belgrade-controlled "new Yugoslavia" created from all regions claimed by Serbia. The SDP delegates asked Ekmečić if he realised that this plan would lead to war. Ekmečić replied, "Of course we know, but this cannot be avoided. No European state was made without bayonets, so this one too will be made with bayonets". When the SDS leadership asked him how many lives this would cost, Ekmečić laughed, saying, "but it is not much to sacrifice a hundred or two hundred lives for a state. A mere nothing." Before the Bosnian War broke out, Ekmečić promoted Serb victimhood, stating that "only the Jews have paid a higher price for their freedom than the Serbs". MacDonald has described this narrative as "victim-centred propaganda" intended to portray one's own nation as a victim of genocide comparable to The Holocaust.

According to an analysis of Serbian historiography after 1991 in the journal Contemporary European History by Christian Axboe Nielsen, an associate professor in the School of Culture and Society at Aarhus University in Denmark, Ekmečić was "complicit in the weaponisation of history, in particular that of the mass atrocities of the Second World War". This trend involved local historians eschewing the standards of international scholarship and concentrating exclusively on sectarian myths, resulting in the production of what has been described by several scholars of the period as "pseudohistory". Sabrina P. Ramet observes that Ekmečić was part of the revisionist wave in Serbian historiography, to which he contributed a religious flavour by claiming that the Catholic Church was the greatest obstacle to the unification of Yugoslavia in 1918, and casting the Vatican as an enemy of the Serbian nation. Ekmečić was expected to appear as a defence witness during the ICTY war crimes prosecution of former Serbian president Slobodan Milošević, but Milošević died before Ekmečić was called to give evidence. After Milošević died in custody in 2006, Ekmečić described him as a "righteous man" who "paid with his head".

== Selected bibliography ==
- Osnove građanske diktature u Evropi između dva rata [Fundamentals of civil dictatorship in Europe between the two wars] (in Serbo-Croatian). Sarajevo, Yugoslavia: Zavod za izdavanje udzbenika. 1965. OCLC 780937894.
- Ustanak u Bosni: 1875–1878 [Uprising in Bosnia: 1875–1878] (in Serbo-Croatian). Sarajevo, Yugoslavia: Veselin Masleša. 1973. OCLC 1170287585.
- Ratni ciljevi Srbije 1914 [War Goals of Serbia in 1914] (in Serbo-Croatian). Belgrade, Yugoslavia: Srpska književna zadruga. 1973. OCLC 443654430. (Second Edition: 1990)
- History of Yugoslavia. New York: McGraw-Hill. 1974. OCLC 489700927. (with Vladimir Dedijer, Ivan Božić and Sima Ćirković)
- Stvaranje Jugoslavije 1790–1918 [Creation of Yugoslavia 1790–1918] (in Serbo-Croatian). Belgrade, Yugoslavia: Prosveta. 1989. OCLC 781095861.
- Srbija između Srednje Evrope i Evrope 1992 [Serbia between Central Europe and Europe in 1992] (in Serbo-Croatian). Belgrade, Yugoslavia: Politika BMG. 1992. OCLC 28936487.
- Ratni ciljevi Srbije: 1914–1918 [War goals of Serbia: 1914–1918] (in Serbo-Croatian). Belgrade, Yugoslavia: Politika. 1992. OCLC 30399588.
- Ustanak u Hercegovini 1852–1862 [Uprising in Herzegovina 1852–1862] (in Serbo-Croatian). Belgrade, Yugoslavia: Srpska akademija nauka i umetnosti [Serbian Academy of Science and Arts ]. 1994. OCLC 1015100059. (with Dušan Berić)
- Radovi iz istorije Bosne i Hercegovine XIX veka [Works from the History of Bosnia and Herzegovina in the 19th Century] (in Serbo-Croatian). Belgrade, Yugoslavia: Beogradski izdavačko-grafički zavod [Belgrade Publishing and Graphic Institute]. 1997. OCLC 607121575.
- Encounters of civilizations and Serbian relations with Europe: More than just military allies from 1914 : a contribution to the French scientists' studies on the ethnic character of Yugoslav people. Novi Sad, Yugoslavia: Toma Maksimović Fund for Aiding Serbs. 1998. OCLC 46959451.
- Srbofobija i antisemitizam [Serbophobia and Antisemitism] (in Serbo-Croatian). Šabac, Yugoslavia: Beli anđeo. 2000. OCLC 495357046.
- Response to Noel Malcom's book Kosovo: a short history: scientific discussion on Noel Malcolm's book "Kosovo. A short history" (Macmillan, London 1998, 492), 8th October 1999. Belgrade, Yugoslavia: Srpska akademija nauka i umetnosti [Serbian Academy of Science and Arts]. 2000. OCLC 48938551. (with Slavenko Terzić)
- Dugo kretanje između klanja i oranja, Istorija Srba u Novom veku 1492–1992 [Long Movement between Slaughter and Plowing, History of Serbs in the New Century 1492-1992] (in Serbo-Croatian). Belgrade, Serbia: Zavod za udžebnike [Institute for Textbooks]. 2007. OCLC 890553833.
