= Tibor Škerlak =

- Born: 1913
- Died: July 8, 1992 (aged 78 or 79); Sarajevo
- Education: Technische Hochschule München
- Scientific career
- Fields: physical chemistry
- Workplaces: University of Ljubljana; University of Sarajevo

Tibor Škerlak (1913–8 July 1992) was a Slovene chemist chiefly noted as a professor of physical chemistry at the Faculty of Humanities, University of Sarajevo.

Škerlak obtained a doctoral degree at the Technische Hochschule München (now the Technical University of Munich) during the interwar period. He married the literary historian Marja Boršnik. When the World War II broke out, he was arrested by the Italian army and sentenced to death, but he escaped prison and joined the resistance movement, though his marriage to Boršnik, who gave birth to their daughter Francka in 1943, ended due to long separation during the war. During this period, he met his second wife, jurist and economist Silva Exel. He was again captured and sent to Dachau concentration camp in 1944. Exel was later arrested as well, but gave birth to their daughter just at that time, so Gestapo released her.

Having survived the internment and the war, Škerlak became an associate professor of theoretical and physical chemistry at the Technical Faculty in Ljubljana. He worked on the potential of crude oil aromatization with Boris Krajnc at that time, among other problems. Some years later, he got into a conflict with the new regime. Supporting the Cominform resolution, he was arrested in 1949, barred from the university and sent to Goli Otok. His wife was pressured to divorce him, but refused, so she lost her government job. He remained interred at the Goli Otok camp until 1951. Later, he became an assistant professor of physical chemistry at the University of Sarajevo where he moved with his family.

Škerlak remained in Sarajevo for the rest of his life. He was known as a supervisor of multiple students and, in later years, for training chemical engineers in industry. In 1964, he was elected full professor at the Faculty of Natural sciences and Mathematics in Sarajevo where he established a chair of physical chemistry and a graduate program "Kinetics and catalysis". He retired in 1984.

He was killed by a sniper in early July 1992 during the siege of Sarajevo, part of the Bosnian War. Škerlak was posthumously rehabilitated in 1998 by the University of Ljubljana.
