= Ljajić =

Ljajić (Serbian Cyrillic: Љајић) is a surname most prevalent among Bosniaks in Serbia. Notable people with the surname include:

- Adem Ljajić (born 1991), Serbian footballer
- Rasim Ljajić (born 1964), Serbian politician
- Elvis Ljajić (born 1983), Bosnian writer
