= Faculty of Philosophy, University of East Sarajevo =

Constituent faculty of University of East Sarajevo in Pale

Faculty of Philosophy University of Istočno Sarajevo
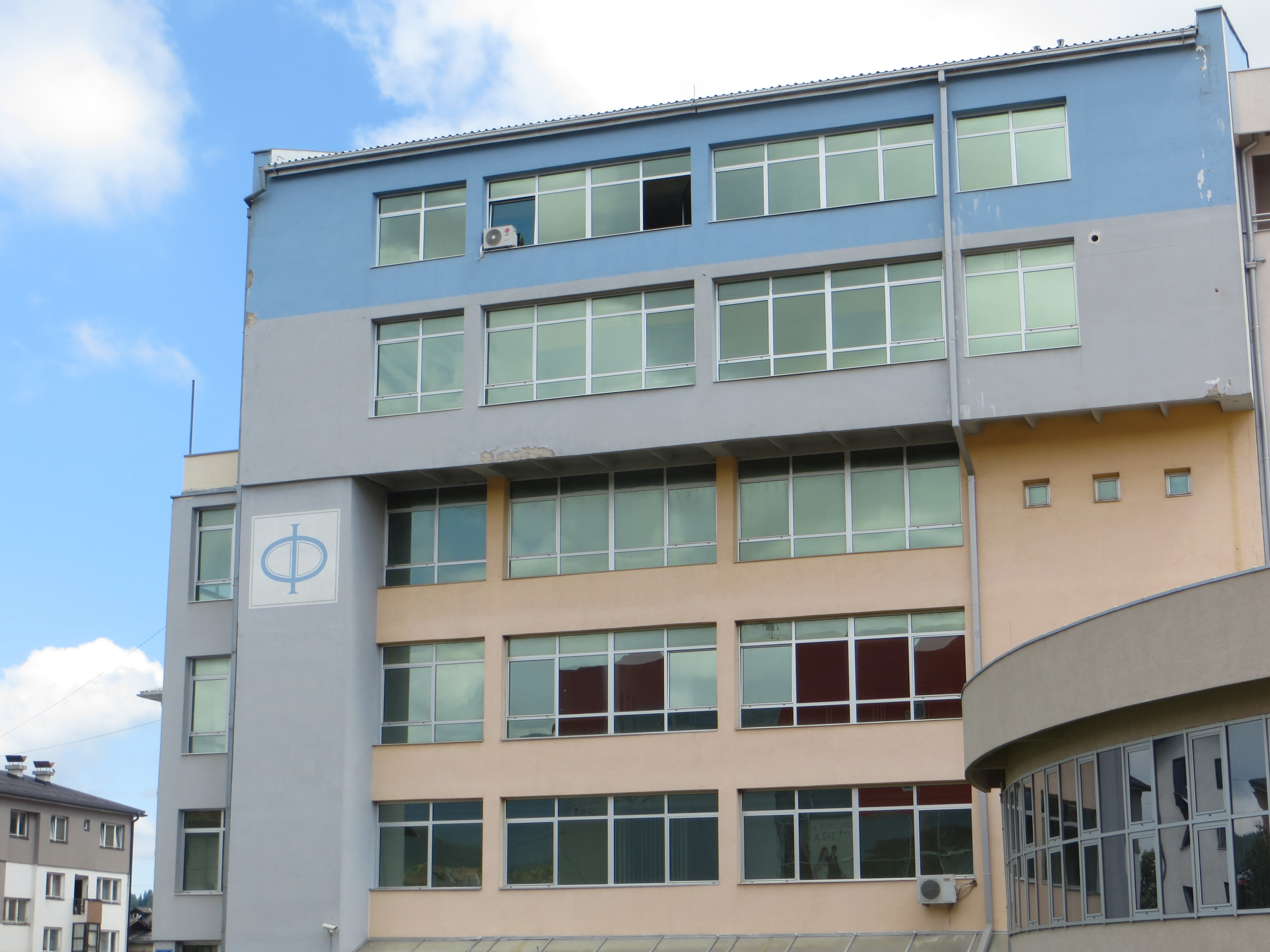
- Faculty's Main Building in East Sarajevo
- Other name: Faculty of Philosophy Pale
- Former names: Faculty of Philosophy Филозофски факултет Универзитета у Источном Сарајеву (Serbian); Filozofski fakultet Univerziteta u Istočnom Sarajevu (Bosnian) Filozofski fakultet Sveučilišta u Istočnom Sarajevu (Croatian)
- Type: Public university
- Established: 1993
- Parent institution: Faculty of Humanities, University of Sarajevo
- Accreditation: Centre for Information and Recognition of Qualifications in Higher Education (Bosnia and Herzegovina)
- Dean: Draga Mastilović
- Location: Pale, Republika Srpska, Bosnia and Herzegovina; 43.85648310168951°N 18.569478482548064°E
- Website: ff.ues.rs.ba

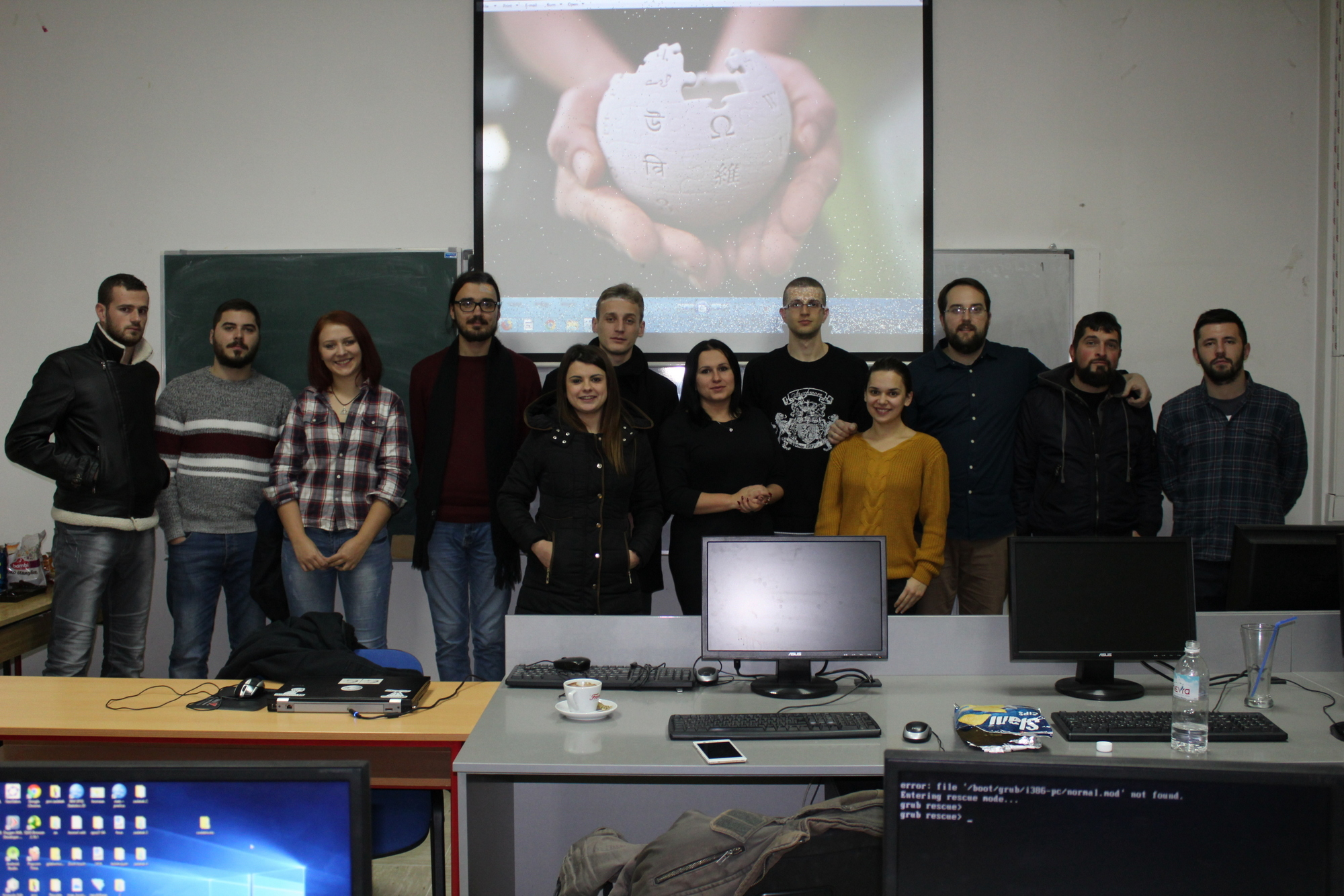
Wikipedia edit-a-thon at the Faculty of Philosophy in Pale, 2017.

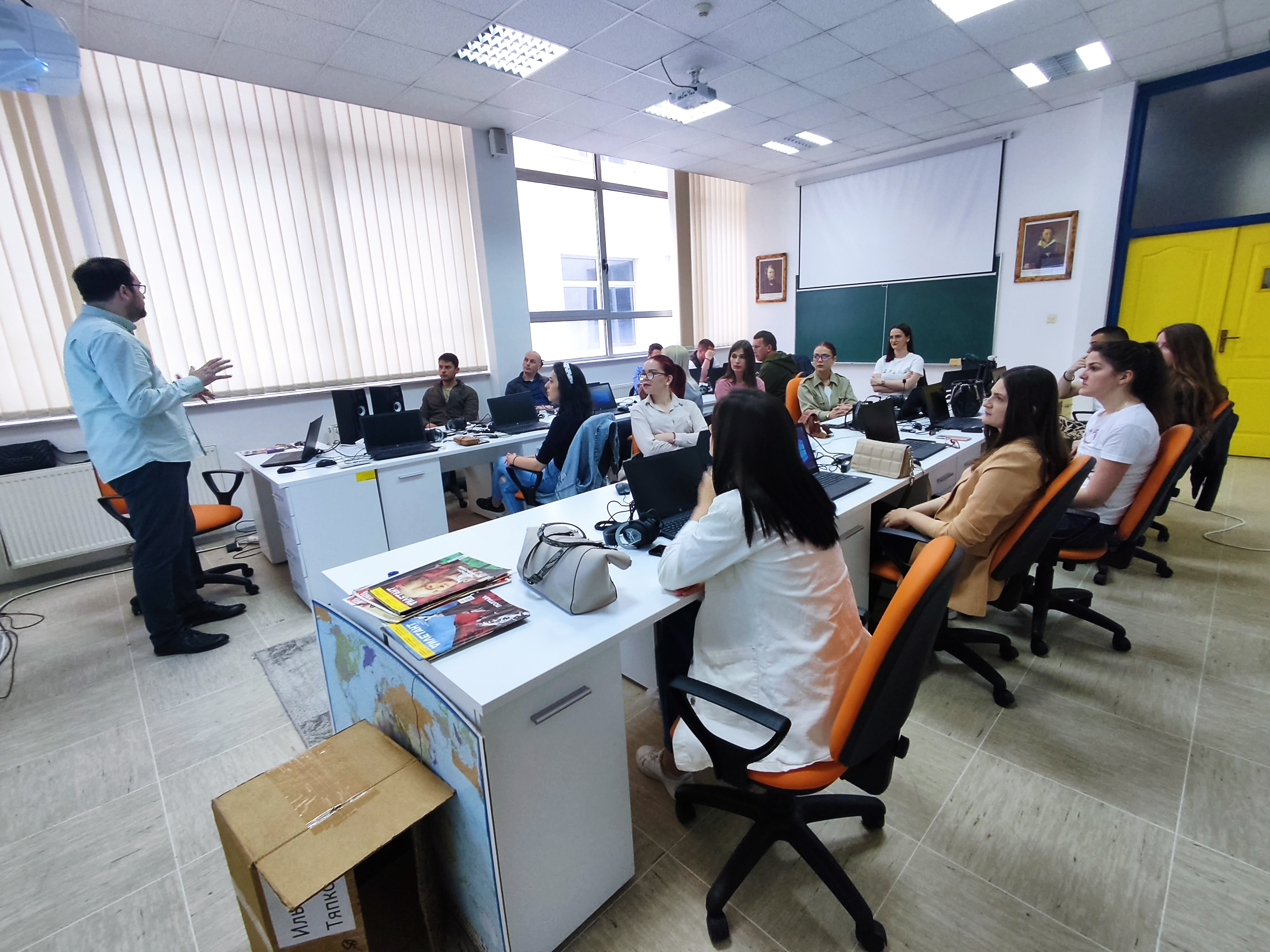
Edu Wiki seminar for professors at the Faculty of Philosophy in Pale, 2022.

The Faculty of Philosophy of the University of Istočno Sarajevo (Serbian Cyrillic: Филозофски факултет Универзитета у Источном Сарајеву) abbreviated as FFUIS is a constituent faculty of the University or Istočno Sarajevo located in Pale, a university town twenty kilometers away from Sarajevo in Republika Srpska, Bosnia and Herzegovina. The Faculty is the largest organizational unit of the University of Istočno Sarajevo. It is one of only five faculties of philosophy in the country.

== History ==
Being formally established in early 1990s in the context of devastating Bosnian War and ethnic separation caused by the Breakup of Yugoslavia, the Faculty nominally belongs to the group of newer institutions of higher education. The faculty was however not built from scratch as the completely new institution. The new faculty was de facto simply a dissociated Serb section of the pre-war Faculty of Humanities of the University of Sarajevo which was transferred from downtown Sarajevo to the Republika Srpska controlled neighboring settlements.

Due to the war, more than 600 professors and several thousand students had to leave Sarajevo. Prior to that the city was the main university center of the Yugoslav constituent Socialist Republic of Bosnia and Herzegovina. The group of university professors decided to renew the work of the Faculty of Philosophy in the Sarajevo suburbs where a large majority of Sarajevo Serbs sought refuge. Modest wartime preconditions have been established and the Serb section of the Sarajevo Faculty has started working again, despite substantial obstacles created by the conflict. Prior to that the city was the main university center of the Yugoslav constituent Socialist Republic of Bosnia and Herzegovina. The group of university professors decided to renew the work of the Faculty of Philosophy in the Sarajevo suburbs where a large majority of Sarajevo Serbs sought refuge. Modest wartime preconditions have been established and the Serb section of the Sarajevo Faculty has started working again, despite substantial obstacles created by the conflict.

On September 16, 2022, Faculty signed a cooperation agreement with the Institute for Contemporary History in Belgrade. As of 2022, the Faculty of Philosophy is the largest higher education institution within the University of East Sarajevo, with 19 study programs on the first cycle, 16 on the second and 3 study programs on the third cycle, with about 2,000 students.'

== Study programs ==
The Faculty of Philosophy is the largest units of the University of Istočno Sarajevo, both in terms of the number of students and teaching staff. It also organizes the largest number of scientific disciplines among all of the faculties at the university. Education at the Faculty of Philosophy is organized in line with Bologna Process into three distinct study cycles. At the Faculty of Philosophy students can study one of the study programs:

- Philosophy
- Sociology and Social Work
- Journalism and Public relations
- Political Science and International Relations
- History and Archaeology
- Pedagogy
- Psychology
- Elementary School Education
- Serbian Language and Literature
- Russian Language and Literature and International Relations
- General Literature and Librarianship
- General Literature and Theatrology
- English Language and Literature
- Chinese and English Language and Literature
- German Language and Literature
- Geography
- Mathematics and Computer Science
- Mathematics and Physics

== See also ==
- Faculty of Humanities, University of Sarajevo
- List of split up universities
- University of Banja Luka
- Faculty of Humanities, University of Mostar
- Faculty of Philosophy, University of Belgrade
- Faculty of Humanities and Social Sciences, University of Zagreb
