= Faculty of Humanities, University of Sarajevo =

Faculty of Humanities and Social Sciences
- Filozofski fakultet u Sarajevu (Bosnian) Филозофски факултет Универзитета у Сарајеву (Serbian) Filozofski fakultet u Sarajevu (Croatian)
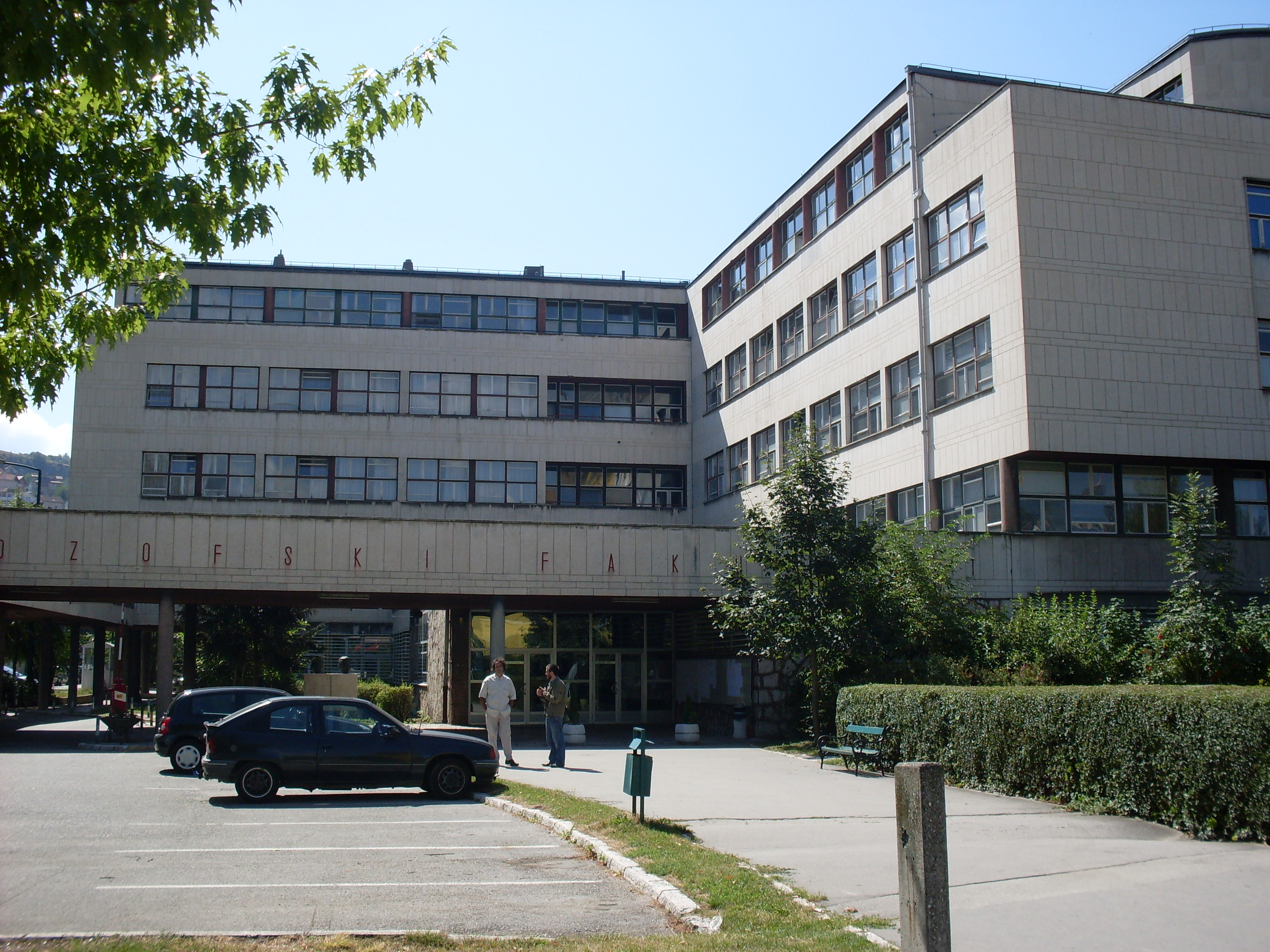
- Type: Faculty
- Established: 1950
- Affiliations: University of Sarajevo
- Location: Sarajevo, Sarajevo Canton, Bosnia and Herzegovina
- Campus: Urban
- Website: ff.unsa.ba/index.php/en/

The Faculty of Humanities and Social Sciences (Bosnian: Filozofski fakultet u Sarajevu) is the oldest and one of the most prominent faculties of the University of Sarajevo in Bosnia and Herzegovina. The institution was established on 14 February 1950 by the decision of the People's Republic of Bosnia and Herzegovina.

== History ==
The faculty was established in the post-World War II period on 14 February 1950 by the decision of the People's Republic of Bosnia and Herzegovina. It was established as a part of a unified institution, together with the Faculty of Natural Sciences, and included following eight subject areas: General and National History, Serbo-Croatian language and Yugoslav literature, German language and literature, French language and literature, Oriental Philology, Mathematics, Chemistry and Geography. Professor Anto Babić, one of the founders, was faculty first dean. Dr. Aleksandar Belić, president of the Serbian Academy of Sciences and Arts, delivered inaugural lecture of the institution November 1950. Faculty's main building was designed by Juraj Neidhardt and constructed between 1955 and 1959.

=== Post-Bosnian War History ===
In May 2013 faculty organized the First Regional Congress of Art History Students attended by students from University of Sarajevo, University of Mostar, University of Zagreb, University of Rijeka, University of Zadar, University of Belgrade and University of Ljubljana. The congress was opened by the TU Dresden professor Tobias Strahl lecture on cultural cleansing of monuments in 1992-1995 period. In April 2015 faculty reopened lectorate of Slovenian language which was closed in 1993. In September that same year in cooperation with the British Council faculty organized the First International Conference on English Language, Literature, Teaching and Translation Studies.

== Publications ==
- Sophos : A Young Researchers Journal

== Notable alumni and faculty ==
=== Alumni ===
Some of the former students of the Faculty of Humanities continued their academic and scientific careers at the faculty and the University of Sarajevo.

- Aleksa Buha
- Dubravko Lovrenović
- Dževad Karahasan
- Enver Kazaz
- Ivo Komšić
- Jasna Šamić
- Marko Šunjić
- Milan Damnjanović
- Milan Vasić
- Miloš Okuka
- Nenad Veličković
- Nijaz Ibrulj
- Predrag Finci
- Ranko Bugarski
- Salmedin Mesihović

=== Faculty ===
- Alojz Benac
- Benjamina Karić
- Desanka Kovačević-Kojić
- Ivan Focht
- Marija Kon
- Meša Selimović
- Milorad Ekmečić
- Muhamed Filipović
- Nikola Koljević
- Senahid Halilović
- Svetozar Koljević
- Vanja Sutlić

== See also ==
- Faculty of Humanities, University of Mostar
- University of Belgrade Faculty of Philosophy
- Faculty of Philosophy, University of Montenegro
- Faculty of Humanities and Social Sciences, University of Zagreb
- Faculty of Philosophy, University of East Sarajevo
