= Mining Code (Serbia) =

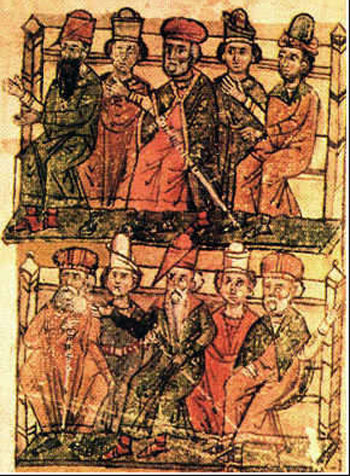
Illustration from a 16th-century illustrated manuscript copy

The Mining Code, also known as the Mining Law or Miners' Law (Serbian Cyrillic: Закон о рудницима) or Novo Brdo Code (Новобрдски законик), was a compilation of medieval laws on mining in the Serbian Despotate, enacted by Despot Stefan Lazarević on 29 January 1412, but formulated somewhat earlier (c. 1390). Apart from mining laws, there are legal provisions concerning the organization and life in Novo Brdo (Статут Новог Брда, the Statute of Novo Brdo), a city which at that time was the largest mine in the Balkans. The compilation survived in several later transcripts, of which a 16th-century illustrated manuscript is regarded as the most important.

== Preserved manuscripts ==
The text was written by mining specialists, the body of 24 "good men" from places outside of Novo Brdo, who have gathered at the invitation of the despot. When the text was finalized Despot Stefan, raised it to the level of the law with his signature and seal at the assembly in Novo Brdo. The Mining Law was made out of two parts. The first part of the Law contained regulations regarding the organization of mining production and everything else that that enabled its undisturbed performance. That first part had 51 articles that regulated: right of ventilation and bringing air through other trenches; dispute resolution arising from ore exploitation; forming mining troupes; purchase and sale of mining property. The goal was to enable undisturbed performance of mining production. The second part of the Law represents the city law of Novo Brdo from the time of Despot Stefan. It contained 22 articles that prescribed: taxes and fines; jurisdiction of the courts; order in the market; position of the Catholics and more. In those regulations of the city law miners of Novo Brdo were given a privileged position: the right of priority in supply, determining the highest provisions prices and some craft services. A large number of regulations of the Mining Law was translated to the Turkish language and taken over in the Saxon law, from the time of Suleiman the Magnificent. Even though it was not the first mining law in medieval Serbia, the text of the code of Novo Brdo was the only one preserved. Its cover bindings, language and content mark it as one of Serbian legal-historical monuments of special value.

=== Cyrillic manuscript ===
The preserved Cyrillic illustrated manuscript of that law, that was discovered in 1959 originates from 1580 and is kept at the Serbian Academy of Sciences and Arts. The text of the law was written by brown ink on 27 sheets and the miniature on the first page represents a mining judicial board. The miniature shows four rows of five sitting figures each. The frame, flag and initials are painted in blue, gold and red. The "journey" of the law from Novo Brdo to the archives of the Serbian Academy of Sciences and Arts is interesting. Based on a few notes we can partially keep track of its history. About a hundred years after its creation, priest Georgije bought the manuscript in 1674 from the priestess Stojne for 120 aspron. At the end of the century, the manuscript was in possession of Hekim-baša Alipašić, who was an Osman official or a doctor. In 1707 he gave it as a gift to the Belgrade-Požarevac Metropolitan Mihajlo, after which the manuscript came into possession of Patriarch Arsenije IV Šakabenta. In that period, it was handled by Ecclesiarch Filotej and Hierodeacon Mihailo from whom was the year 1745 recorded, while the year 1753 was recorded elsewhere. Nikola Radojčić who researched the manuscript on behalf of the SASA deems that it was moved from the Patriarchate library to Vienna. During the next two centuries the manuscript was in private possession due to it not having a seal of an official institution, for it only to appear after the Second world war at an antiques auction. On that occasion, it was bought by the spouse of the Yugoslav diplomat France Hočevar (then ambassador in Bucharest), who gifted the manuscript on April 11, 1959, to the Serbian Academy of Sciences and Arts. The manuscript was placed in the archives of SASA, and academician Radojčić published the manuscript in 1962 along with his work about it called "The mining law of Despot Stefan Lazarević".

=== Latinic manuscript ===
The Latinic transcript of the Mining law, 13 pages long and dated with the 26th of July, 1638, was found by the academician Petar Kolendić in the city library of Split. The manuscript was created in the Bulgarian mining centre Chiprovtsi.

== Dating the mining law ==
In historical science a dispute arose about the dating of the Mining Law. In the manuscript itself it is stated that it was created in the year 6920, indictment 13, on January 29. The data mismatch lies in the fact that the year 6920 since the beginning of the world corresponds to the year 1412 from the birth of Christ, while the indict 13 may relate to years 1389/1390, 1404/1405 or 1419/1420, during the rule of Despot Stefan Lazarević. Besides that, additional confusion in dating comes from anachronistic data that from one side mention the death of Prince Lazar (1371-1389), counselling with his mother Milica (died in 1405) and Patriarch Spiridon (1380-1389), Sultan Bayazid, while on the other side the year 1412 is mentioned, and Stefan with the title of Despot which he bore since 1402. According to academician Sima Ćirković, who has considered arguments from both sides, the most probable is that the Mining Law was first formulated in 1390 and later validated by Stefan himself in 1412 after he regained control over the south side of the country (regions south of West Morava), after the death of his younger brother Vuk in 1410. He draws this conclusion based on the established practice of rulers. After they have conquered or have come into possession of a territory, to validate previous charters relating to those territories.

== See also ==
- Serbia in the Middle Ages
- Saxons in medieval Serbia
- Mining and metallurgy in medieval Europe

== Sources ==
- Ćirković, Sima (2004). The Serbs. Malden: Blackwell.
- Fine, John Van Antwerp Jr. (1994) [1987]. The Late Medieval Balkans: A Critical Survey from the Late Twelfth Century to the Ottoman Conquest. Ann Arbor, Michigan: University of Michigan Press.
- Janićijević, Jovan, ed. (1998). The Cultural Treasury of Serbia. Belgrade: Idea, Vojnoizdavački zavod, Markt system.
- Kovačević-Kojić, Desanka (2014). "On the Composition and Processing of Precious Metals mined in Medieval Serbia" (PDF). Balcanica. 45: 97–106.
- Mirković, Zoran S., ed. (2019). Serbian law history. Belgrade: University of Belgrade, Faculty of Law.
- Zakon o rudnicima despota Stefana Lazarevica
