= Prebilovci =

Prebilovci Пребиловци
- Village
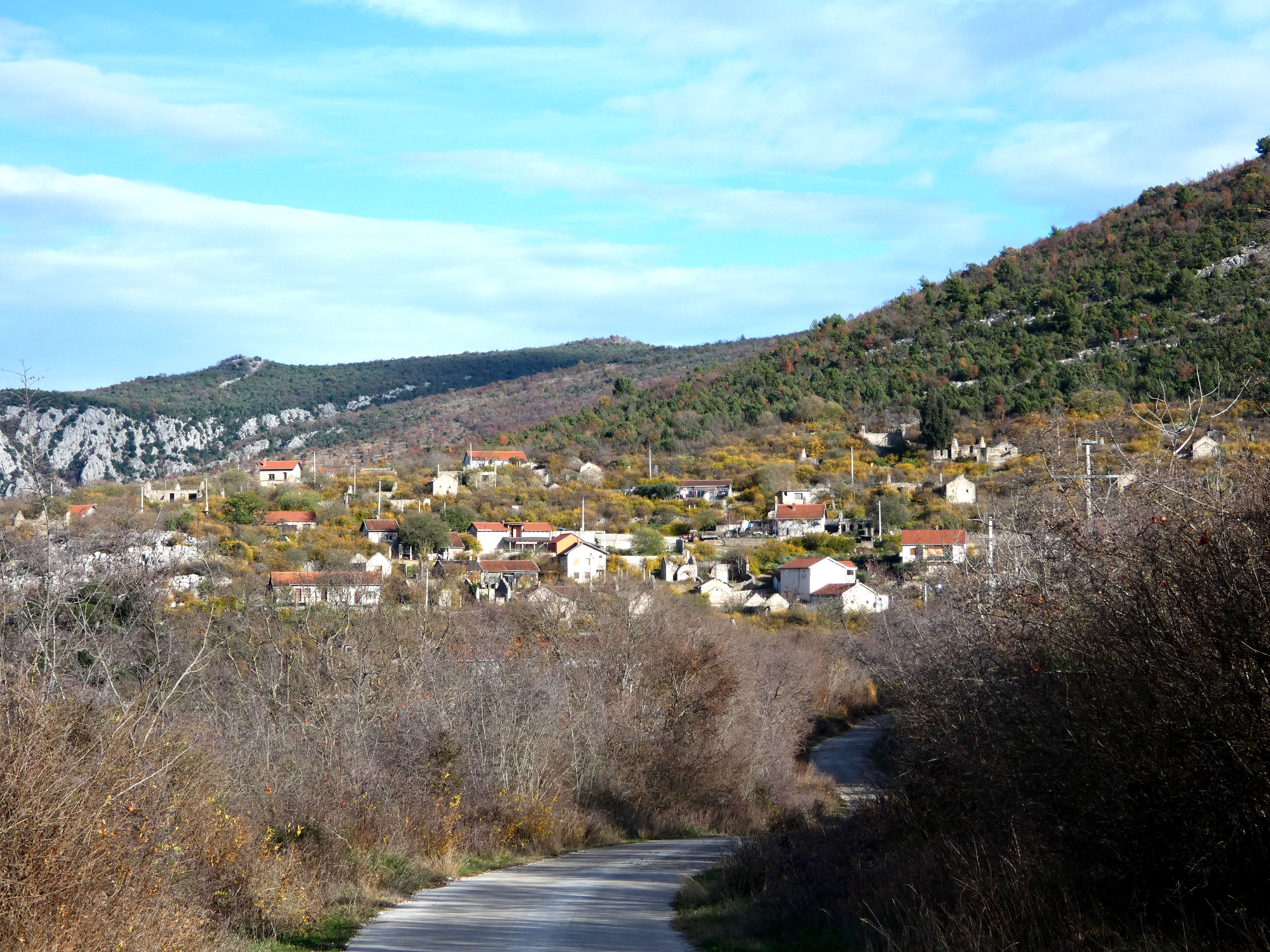

- Location within Bosnia and Herzegovina
- Coordinates: 43°05′40″N 17°45′12″E
- Country: Bosnia and Herzegovina
- Entity: Federation of Bosnia and Herzegovina
- Canton: Herzegovina-Neretva
- Municipality: Čapljina

Area
  - Total: 4.95 sq mi (12.81 km^{2})

Population (2013)
  - Total: 57
  - Density: 12/sq mi (4.4/km^{2})
- Time zone: UTC+1 (CET)
  - Summer (DST): UTC+2 (CEST)

Prebilovci (Serbian Cyrillic: Пребиловци) is a village in Bosnia and Herzegovina, near the city of Čapljina (Чапљина). Prebilovci was first mentioned in the 15th century. The village has a population of roughly around 50 inhabitants.

Prebilovci is located in the Čapljina municipality, which makes up one of the nine municipalities in the Herzegovina-Neretva Canton. The village is also located near the Nature Park and Bird Reserve of Hutovo Blato (5 km from Čapljina). Since 1995, Hutovo Blato has been protected as a nature park by the Public Enterprise Hutovo Blato.

== Population ==
=== 1991 census ===
Total: 174

- Serbs - 171 (98.27%)
- Croats - 1 (0.57%)
- others and unknown - 2 (1.14%)

=== 2013 census ===
Total : 57

- Serbs: 57.

== History ==
The name of the village, Prebilovci, first emerged sometime around the 15th century, and is believed to have come from the old family of Pribilović. In the Serb Orthodox cemetery and in some other locations too, there are many beautifully carved out stone graves, probably of bogomils from the Middle Ages. There is also an old grave which is believed to have belonged to a certain Stjepan Pribilović. Today the name Pribilovci is also more frequently used for the village.

Before the outbreak of the Second World War In Yugoslavia, the village was made up of Serbs and a few Bosniak families as well. The present population is primary made up of Serbs, ever since the war drew to a close, when the Bosniaks left their homes or were expelled because of the ethnic tensions.

=== World War II ===
During the Second World War, on 6 August 1941, Croatian forces led the Prebilovci Massacre. Some 650 women and children were taken away from their homes, after which they were moved to a place called Šurmanci, where they were later thrown to death into natural pits around that area (the most infamous being Golubinka pit), together with 1,300 other Serbs living in the Čapljina and Mostar municipalities.

=== 1990s war ===
The village was attacked again in 1992, with memorial and remains to the Prebilovci Massacre's victims being destroyed.
