= Hercegovina (journal) =

Hercegovina: journal of cultural heritage and history
- Discipline: humanities
- Language: Croatian, English
- Edited by: Božo Goluža

Publication details
- Publisher: Faculty of Humanities, University of Mostar (Bosnia and Herzegovina)
- Frequency: annual

Standard abbreviations
- ISO 4: Hercegovina

Indexing
- ISSN: 2566-3429

Links
- Journal homepage; Hrčak

Hercegovina: journal of cultural heritage and history (Croatian: Hercegovina: časopis za kulturno i povijesno naslijeđe) is a Bosnian-Herzegovinian interdisciplinary annual bilingual scientific journal of the Cathedra of History of the Faculty of Humanities, University of Mostar. First issue was published in 1981. The journal was not published during the Bosnian War, but was renewed following its ending in 1995. During the 2000s journal changed several co-publishers: National Library in Mostar (1995-2011, 15 issues), Herzegovina Museum and Herzegovina Archive (both 1998–2003, 5 issues). Twenty five issues were published till 2011 when a perennial pause was made. The journal was relaunched in 2015.

Former editors-in-chief were Anđelko Zelenika (1981–90), Tomislav Anđelić (1995-2011) and Šaban Zahirović (1998-2003). Current editor is Božo Goluža.

The journal has been indexed in CEEOL, ERIH PLUS, Slavus – Slavic Humanities Index and Hrčak.
