= Prebilovci massacre =

1941 atrocity in Croatia during World War II

Prebilovci massacres
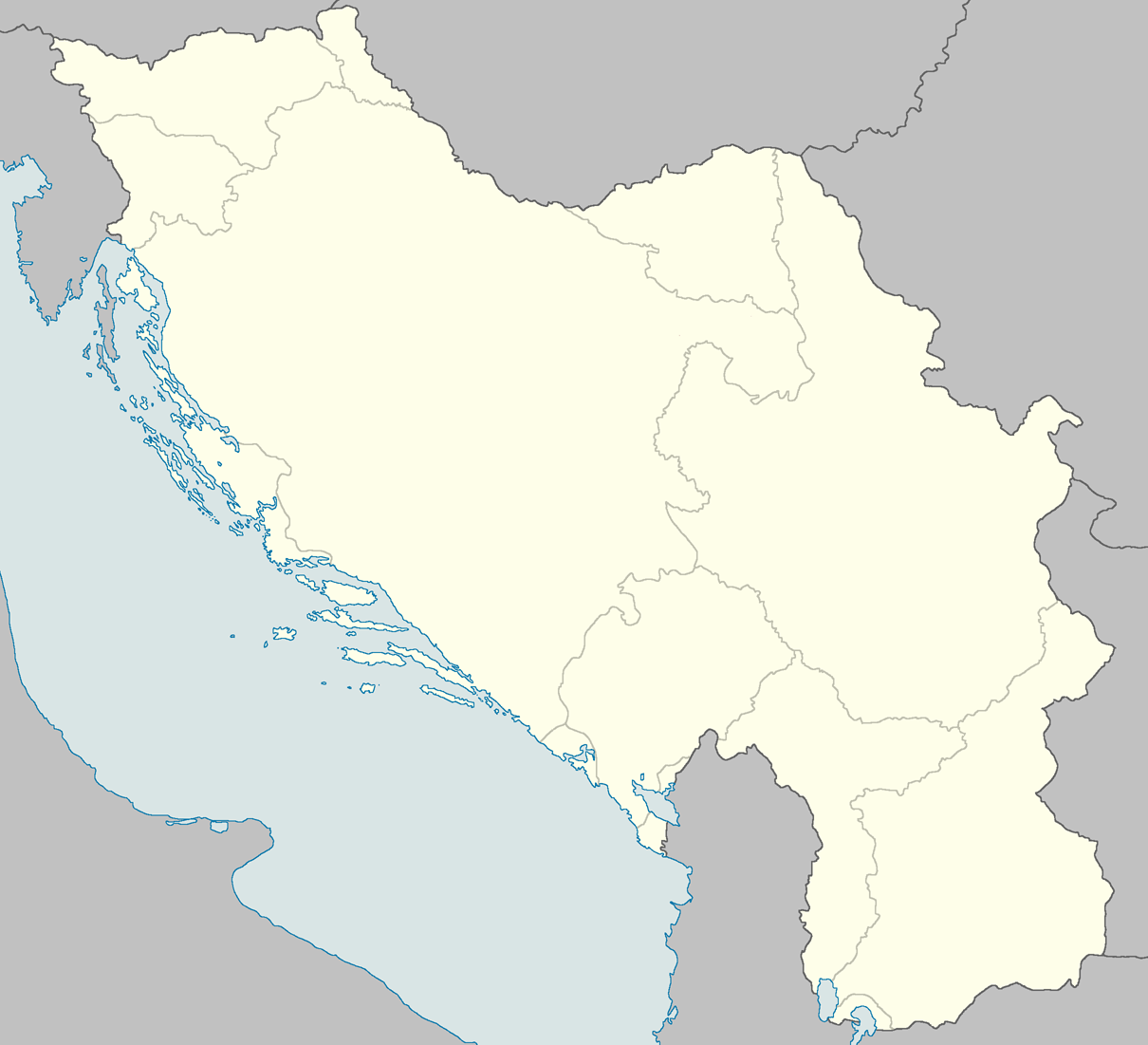
- Location of Prebilovci on a map of Occupied Yugoslavia
- Location: 43°05′39″N 17°45′13″E; Villages of Prebilovci, Šurmanci, Golubinka pit
- Date: August 1941
- Target: Civilian Serbs, including women and children
- Attack type: War crime, civilian massacre
- Deaths: ~800
- Perpetrator: Croatian Ustaše
- Motive: Religious-ethnic cleansing

The Prebilovci massacre (Serbian: Масакр у Пребиловцима) was an atrocity and war crime perpetrated by the Croatian Ustaše in the Independent State of Croatia during the World War II genocide of Serbs. On 6 August 1941, the Ustaše killed around 600 women and children from the village of Prebilovci, Herzegovina, by throwing them into the Golubinka pit, near Šurmanci.

During the summer of 1941, the Ustaša continued with mass murders of Serbs – of 1,000 inhabitants of Prebilovci, 820 of them were killed, while in the neighbouring places of the lower basin of the Neretva river, including Šurmanci, around 4,000 Serbs were killed. The Golubinka pit was covered with concrete in 1961.

== Persecution ==
During the Second World War the Serb inhabitants of Prebilovci, a small village near Čapljina, fell victim to genocide. At the beginning of 1941, the village had a population of 1,000. Earlier, it had given volunteers to join the Bosnian-Herzegovinian uprising against the Turks in 1875-78, and contributed 20 volunteers to the Serbian Army in Salonica during World War I.

Many villagers died as prisoners in the Austro-Hungarian Empire concentration camps. Croat nationalists reportedly harboured hatred at Prebilovci's contribution to the World War I Serbian army. Prebilovci was surrounded on the night of 4 August 1941 by some 3,000 Ustaša made up of the village's Croats.

== Massacre ==
In August 1941, some 650 women and children were taken away from their homes, moved to Šurmanci where they were later thrown into natural pits around that area — either dead or half-dead according to accounts – together with a thousand or so other Serbs from the Čapljina and Mostar municipalities. The men were in the mountains, hiding, in the deluded belief that the Ustaše would not harm their women and children.

The Serbs of Prebilovci were herded together with other Serbs from the western part of Herzegovina and eventually six carloads of them were sent off on a train that was supposedly to take them to Belgrade. They were ordered out of the six cars they occupied at a town called Šurmanci, on the west bank of the Neretva, and marched off into the hills never to return.

Atrocities began in the villages including the killing of 50 infants who were swung by their legs so that their heads could be dashed against the school wall. There was continuous rape of young girls both there and at other locations. On 6 August, 150 Ustaša under Ivan Jovanović (known as "Blacky") were joined by another 400 Ustaša from Čapljina, and took the prisoners in rail cattle-cars to Vranac, some 500 to 1,000 m from the Golubinka pit, one of many such natural, near-vertical cave formations in the region, where some 550 Ustaša took small groups of prisoners to the pit and, family-by-family, pushed them into it. The initial vertical fall was some 27 m, followed by a 100 m steep slope to the base of the pit. Small children were thrown up into the air before falling into the pit. One woman is known to have given birth as she fell into the pit. The newborn infant died with her under the crush of bodies.

Here is how the Catholic Bishop of Mostar, Alojzije Mišić, described this and other massacres perpetrated by the Ustasha around the city of Mostar, in his letter to Bishop Alojzije Stepinac, dated 7 November 1941:

People were captured like animals. Slaughtered, killed - thrown alive into the abyss. Women, mothers with children, adult girls, women and children, both male and female were thrown into the pits. The Vice Mayor of Mostar Mr. Baljić, proclaimed publicly, as a clerk, he should be silent instead of talking, that in the town of Ljubinje, into only one pit, 700 Orthodox Christians were thrown. From Mostar and Čapljina six full rail wagons transported wives, mothers and girls younger than ten, to the station at Šurmanci, where they were taken to the hills, living mothers with children thrown down steep cliffs. Everyone was tossed down the cliffs and killed. In the parish Klepci, from surrounding villages N. N., 3,700 Orthodox Christians were killed. The poor souls, they remained peaceful. I won't enumerate further. I'd go too far. In the city of Mostar hundreds were tied, taken outside the town and killed like animals

One entire clan of 78 persons died in the crush of the Golubinka pit near the village of Šurmanci. And after all were pushed into it, the Ustaša sat around drinking and celebrating. Only 170 villagers survived. Forty-five survived the crush of the pits and escaped later to tell of the disaster. 300 children and infants were massacred that day alone.

== Aftermath ==
=== Trials ===
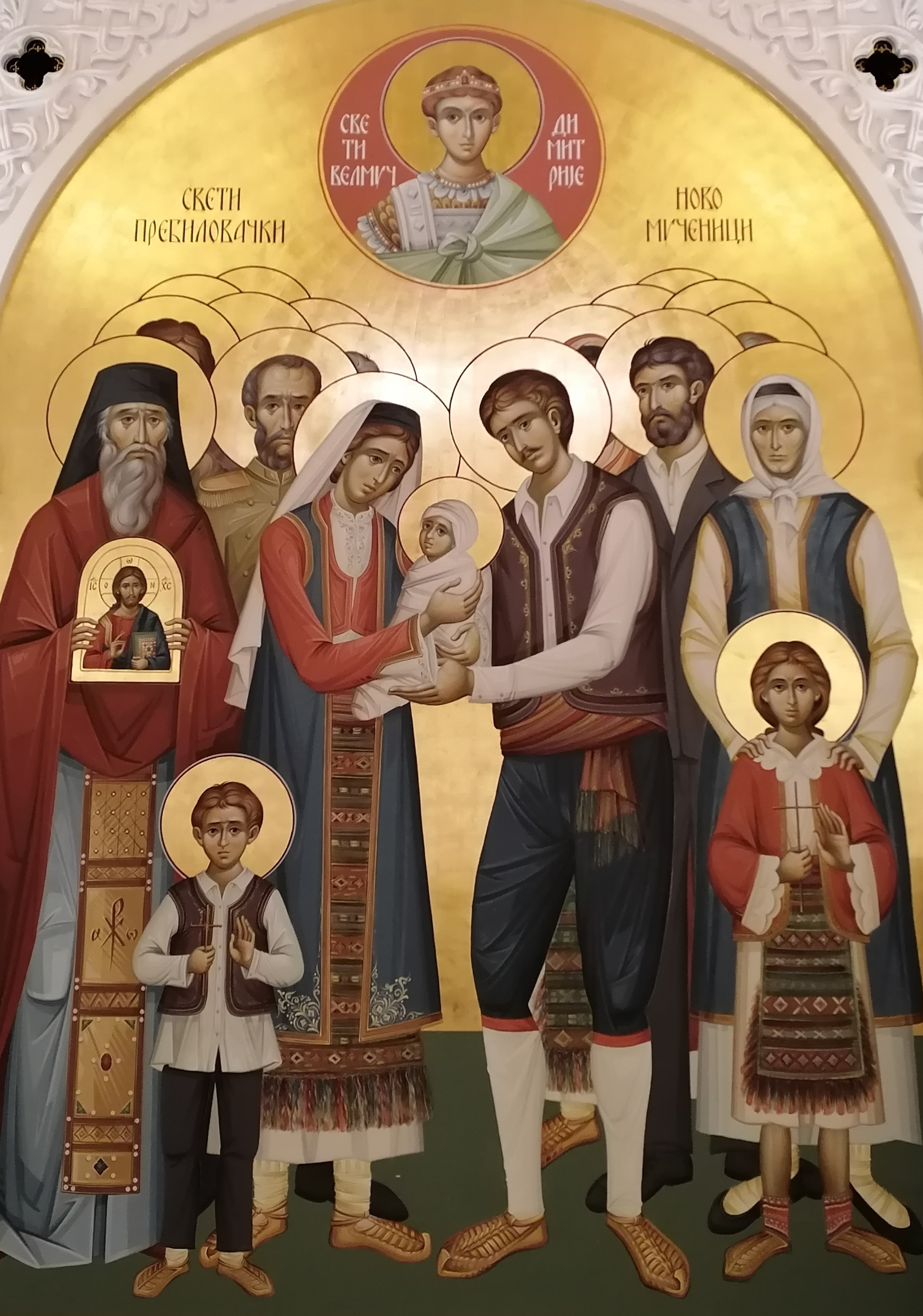
Fresco of the Holy martyrs of Prebilovci in the crypt of the church of Saint Sava, Belgrade

A group of 170 villagers, which primarily consisted of men, survived the massacre. Two Roman Catholic priests, Ilija Tomas and Marko Hovko, were among the murderers. Few of the Ustaša who took part were tried after the war had ended. Only 14 of the 550 known Ustaša were brought to trial after the war, and one of the judges was himself an Ustaša close to the crime. Six were sentenced to death, the remainder received prison sentences, the majority around three years.

=== Memory ===
The Golubinka pit was opened in 1990 when Serbian priests headed by patriarch Pavle entered it and held a memorial service over the remnants of the victims. Around 1550 remnants were taken out from the pit. In 1991, on the 50th anniversary of the massacre, some 4000 victims, taken out from the Golubinka and from the surrounding 15 pits, were buried in the crypt of the Church of the Synaxis of Serbian Saints and Martyrs of Prebilovci.

=== 1990s civil war ===
In June 1992, members of the Army of the Republic of Croatia burnt the village and destroyed the crypt and the church. The remnants of the holy relics are today held in the crypt of the temple under reconstruction.

== See also ==
- List of massacres in Yugoslavia during World War II

== Sources ==
- Mirković, Jovan (2014). Злочини над Србима у Независној Држави Хрватској – фотомонографија/Crimes against Serbs in the Independent State of Croatia – photomonograph. Svet knjige Belgrade. ISBN 978-86-7396-465-2. Archived from the original on 2016-04-08.
- Šarić, Mitar (1992). Greh ćutanja je prekinut: ustaški genocid nad srpskim narodom u selu Prebilovci avgusta 1941. Ministarstvo za informacije Republike Srbije.
- Skoko, Savo (1991). Pokolji hercegovačkih Srba '41. Belgrade: Stručna knjiga.
- Vojinović, Novica (1991). Srpske jame u Prebilovcima: genocid hrvatskih kleroustaša nad Srbima u Hercegovini. Titograd: N. Vojinović.
