= Elvis Ljajić =

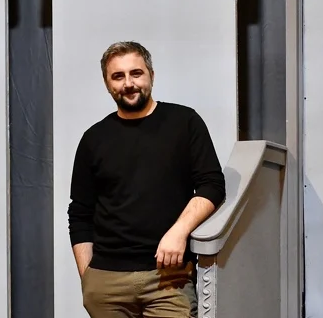
- Born: Elvis Ljajić; May 10, 1983 (age 42); Sjenica
- Education: Faculty of Philosophy - University of Sarajevo
- Known for: writing, critics
- Notable work: Zmaj od Bosne (drama); Godina kad smo odrasli (proza)
- Spouse: Vildana Bratić

Elvis Ljajić is a Bosnian playwright, writer and critic.

== Biography ==
Elvis Ljajić was born on May 20, 1983 in Sjenica, Serbia. He finished elementary school and secondary medical school in Zenica. He received his master's degree from the Faculty of Philosophy of the University of Sarajevo, studying comparative literature and librarianship.

He is one of the founders and editors of the online magazine for theatre, literary and film criticism Kritika. He was a contributor to the magazine for literature and culture Život, he published in Sarajevo Notebooks, Oslobođenje, the newsletters of Theatre Games in Jajce, the Festival of Bosnian-Herzegovinian Drama Zenica, and the Meeting of Theatres of the Brčko District of BiH.

He was a member of the expert jury of the 40th jubilee theater/theatre games in Jajce, and the president of the jury for the selection of the best monodrama text at the 2nd "InBox" monodrama festival.

He is a member of the editorial board of the online magazine for poetry and short literary forms Fragment.

Together with poet Goran Vrhunac, he is the author and host of the Literary Corner.

He is member of PEN Centre in Bosnia and Herzegovina.

== Works ==
The historical drama "Zmaj od Bosne" ("Dragon of Bosnia") was awarded the biennial Revival Award "Alija Isaković" for the best dramatic text in the Bosnian language for 2021

He is the author of the book of short stories "Godina kad smo odrasli" ("The Year We Grow Up"), which was published in 2023 with the help of the Ministry of Culture of the Sarajevo Canton.

== Awards ==
- 2019. WHF, third place for short story, Široki Brijeg
- 2021. "Alija Isaković" Award, Sarajevo
