= Grahovik =

- Village
- Location within Bosnia and Herzegovina
- Coordinates: 44.2095847°N 17.6714863°E
- Country: Bosnia and Herzegovina
- Entity: Federation of Bosnia and Herzegovina
- Canton: Central Bosnia
- Municipality: Travnik

Area
  - Total: 0.34 sq mi (0.87 km^{2})

Population (2013)
  - Total: 277
  - Density: 820/sq mi (320/km^{2})
- Time zone: UTC+1 (CET)
  - Summer (DST): UTC+2 (CEST)

Grahovik is a village in the municipality of Travnik, Bosnia and Herzegovina.

== Demographics ==
According to the 2013 census, its population was 277.

Ethnicity in 2013
Ethnicity	Number	Percentage
Bosniaks	182	65.7%
Croats	80	28.9%
Serbs	4	1.4%
other/undeclared	11	4.0%
Total	277	100%
