= Darko Tanasković =

Serbian diplomat and philologist

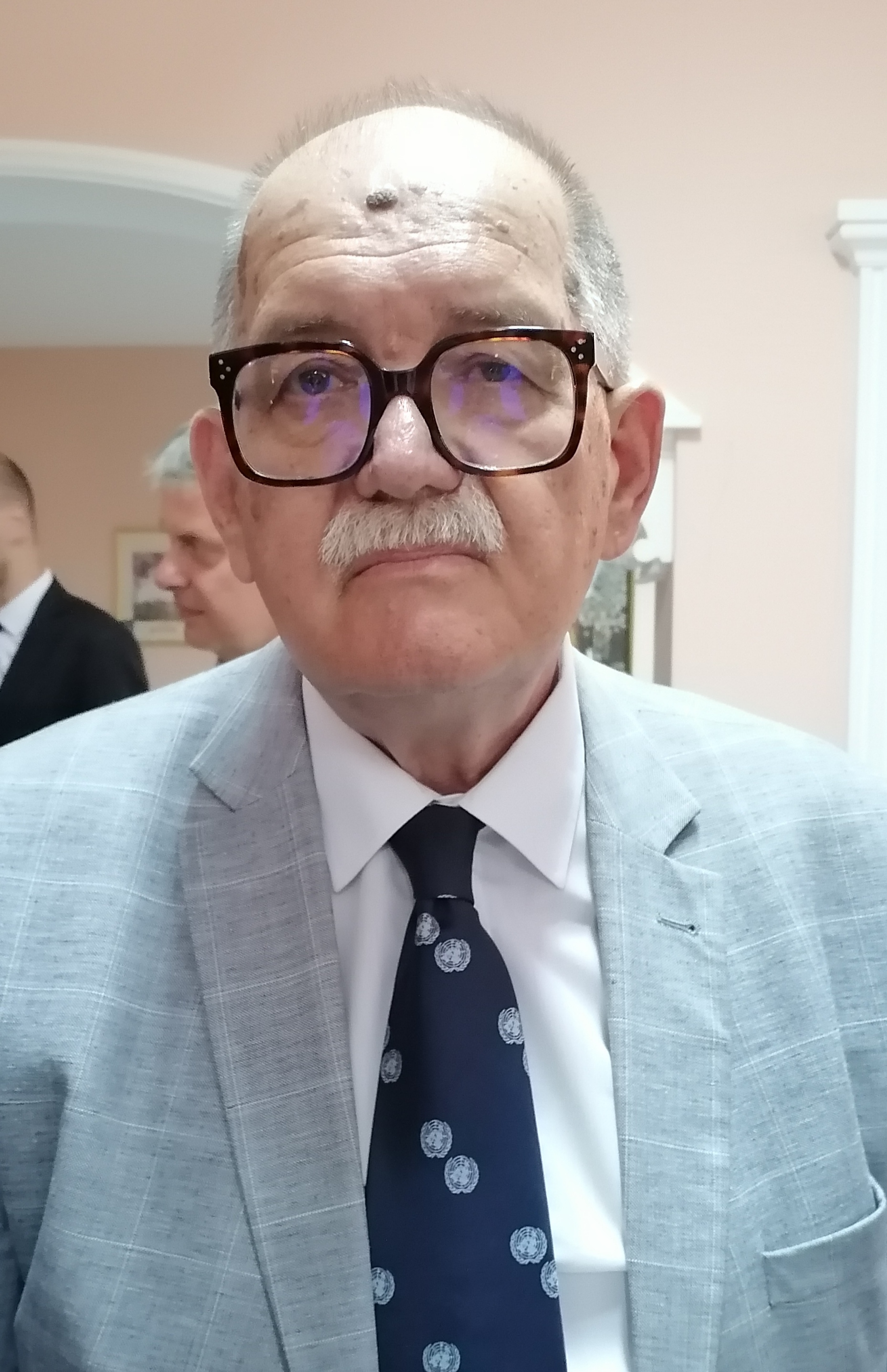
- Tanasković in 2023
- Born: 4 January 1948 (age 78); Zagreb, FPR Yugoslavia
- Education: University of Belgrade Faculty of Philology
- Occupations: University professor, ambassador, writer, translator
- Awards: Order of Pope Pius IX, Order of St. Sava

Darko Tanasković (Serbian Cyrillic: Дарко Танасковић; 4 January 1948) is a Serbian university professor of Oriental studies, writer, translator, academic and diplomat.

Tanasković was the Ambassador of Serbia to Turkey, Azerbaijan, Vatican City, Sovereign Military Order of Malta and UNESCO.

He authored over 600 scientific works and articles.

== Selected works ==
- Bošnjaci na stranputici "bosanstva" (2023)
- Pusto tursko (2021)
- Autonomija mišljenja: novi razgovori sa Darkom Tanaskovićem (2016)
- Veliki povratak Turske?: Neoosmanizam ili Islamizam (2015)
- Belezi vremena (2014)
- Golub koji nije postao ptica (2012)
- Neoosmanizam - povratak Turske na Balkan: doktrina i spoljnopolitička praksa (2010; 2011)
- Islam: dogma i život (2008)
- Gramatika arapskog jezika (co-authored with A. Mitrović, 2005)
- Jugoistok Srbije: Kontinuitet krize i mogući ishodi (s grupom autora, 2001)
- Tanasković, Darko (2000). Islam i mi (1. ed.). Beograd: Partenon.
  - Tanasković, Darko (2002). Islam i mi (2. ed.). Beograd: Partenon.
    - Tanasković, Darko (2006). Islam i mi (3. ed.). Beograd: Partenon.
      - Tanasković, Darko (2010). Islam i mi (4. ed.). Beograd: Partenon.
- Autonomija mišljenja (2000)
- Na Istoku Zapada (2000)
- Tursko-srpski rečnik (co-author with S. Đinđić i M. Teodosijević, 1997)
- Tanasković, Darko (1995). "Protivrečnosti neobošnjaštva". Bosna i Hercegovina od srednjeg veka do novijeg vremena. Beograd: Istorijski institut SANU. pp. 47–56. ISBN 9788677430078.
- U dijalogu s islamom (1992)
- Kontrastivna analiza arapskog i srpskohrvatskog jezika (1982)
- Arapski jezik u savremenom Tunisu (1982)
- Sufizam (co-authored with I. Šop)
- Arapska poezija (1977)
