= Faculty of Humanities, University of Mostar =

Faculty of Humanities and Social Sciences, University of Mostar
- Filozofski fakultet Sveučilišta u Mostaru
- Type: Public
- Established: 1 October 2005
- Affiliations: University of Mostar
- Dean: Dražen Barbarić
- Students: 3,000
- Location: Mostar, Bosnia and Herzegovina; 43°20′38″N 17°47′50″E
- Website: ff.sve-mo.ba

Faculty of Humanities and Social Sciences, University of Mostar (Croatian: Filozofski fakultet Sveučilišta u Mostaru) is a public institution belonging to the University of Mostar, located in Mostar, Bosnia and Herzegovina.

== History ==
The Faculty of Humanities derived from the Faculty of Pedagogy during the 2005/06 academic year. At first, it was named Faculty of Humanities and Social Sciences, but later changed it to the current name.

The activity of the Faculty is determined in the Faculty's Statute. Since its foundation, the Faculty of Humanities adopet programme of the Bologna declaration 3 + 2 + 3.

== Organization ==
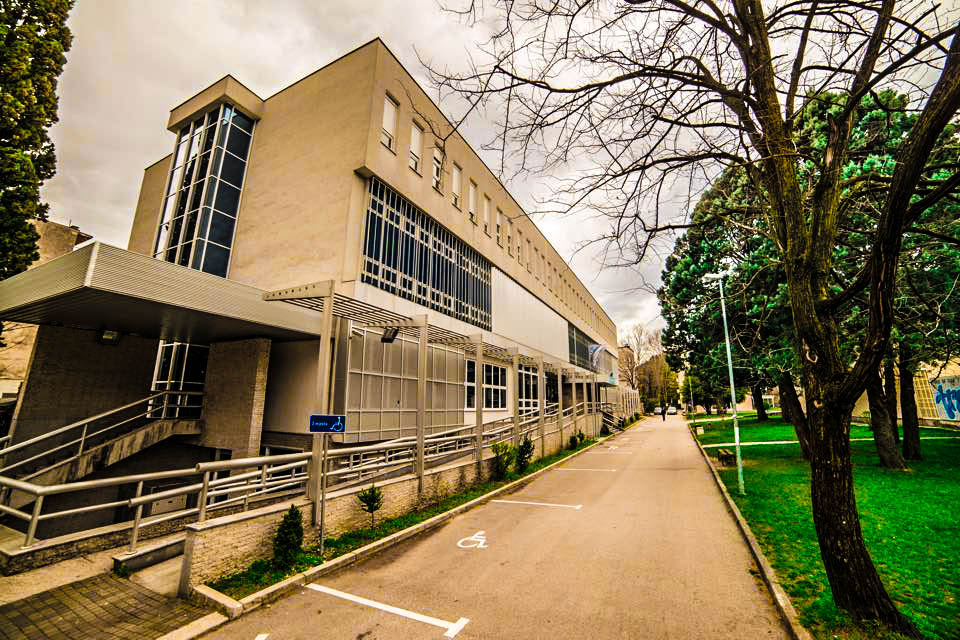
Faculty of Humanities and Social Sciences in Mostar

The undergraduate studies of the Faculty of Humanities and Social Sciences cover nine single majors and twelve double majors that can be combined in various ways, so they made 69 different majors. The graduate studies have eight single majors and as many double majors, which together combine 38 different majors. The Faculty of Humanities also provides additional training in public relations, social work and librarianship. Those trainings can be taken by students with college education with during 3rd and 4th academic year of a study. Also, the Faculty of Humanities performs graduate doctoral studies in Languages and Cultures in Contact that covers humanities and social sciences, and is divided in seven fields of study: Croatian, English and German studies, Latin language, history, philosophy, information Science and communication Science.

In the academic year 2013/14, the Faculty of Humanities had more than 3,000 students, which makes it the largest faculty within the University of Mostar. It has 219 lecturers, out of which 140 have PhDs.

The Faculty of Humanities has its dislocated departments in Kiseljak and Orašje. Since 2014, the Faculty's department in Kiseljak also teaches political science for undergraduate students, while in Orašje the department has undergraduate and graduate studies of the Croatian language and literature, the journalism and the social work, as well as 1st academic year in the English language and literature and additional training in social work.

The professional staff that works at the Faculty, except those from the University of Mostar, which also comes from the universities in Zagreb, Zadar, Split, Osijek, Sarajevo, as well as respective institutes from Zagreb and Dubrovnik.

== Activity ==
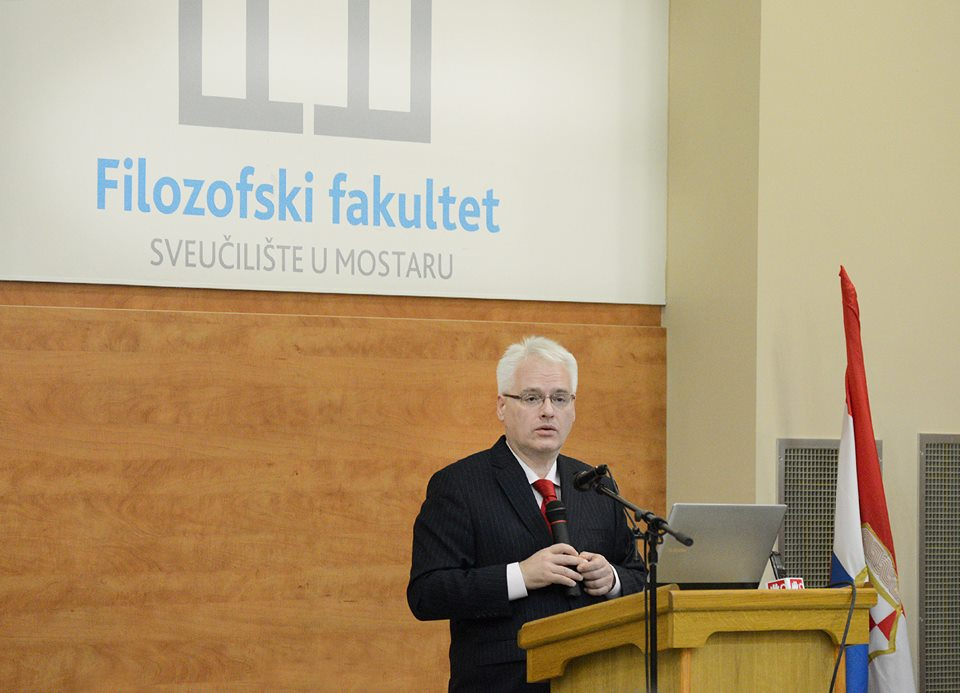
Croatian president Ivo Josipović gives a lecture at the Faculty of Humanities

Every year, the Faculty of Humanities organizes scientific conferences that are said to be of great importance. With its teachings and scientific-research activity, the Faculty of Humanities cooperates with the Institute for Croatian Language, Literature and History, the Institute for Latinity and other members of the University of Mostar. The Faculty of Humanities also works on establishing and maintaining cooperation with other related studies in Bosnia and Herzegovina, Croatia and other European countries.

The Faculty of Humanities publishes a magazine, the Hum, a scientific publication. The first issue of the Hum was printed in December 2006. Cathedra of History publishes journal Hercegovina.

The building of the Faculty of Humanities has an adequate space for performing lecturing, modern equipped amphitheaters and classrooms.

== See also ==
- Faculty of Philosophy, University of Sarajevo
- Faculty of Humanities and Social Sciences, University of Zagreb
- University of Belgrade Faculty of Philosophy
- Faculty of Philosophy, University of Montenegro
