= Milan Vasić =

- Born: 19 December 1928; Donja Pecka, Mrkonjić Grad, Kingdom of Serbs, Croats and Slovenes
- Died: 26 December 2003 (aged 75); Banja Luka, Republic of Srpska, Bosnia and Herzegovina
- Occupation: historian
- Known for: being president of the Academy of Sciences and Arts of the Republika Srpska
- Spouse: Lela
- Parents: Ostoja Vasic (father); Janja Videkanjic (mother)

Milan Vasić (19 December 1928, Donja Pecka, Mrkonjić Grad, Kingdom of Serbs, Croats and Slovenes – 26 December 2003, Banja Luka, Republic of Srpska, Bosnia and Herzegovina) was a Serbian historian. He was a member of the Academy of Sciences and Arts of the Republika Srpska since 1997 and its president in 2003. He was corresponding member of the Academy of Science and Arts of Bosnia and Herzegovina since 1987.
