= Svetozar Koljević =

Serbian academic (1930–2016)

Svetozar Koljević (Serbian Cyrillic: Светозар Кољевић; 9 September 1930 – 29 May 2016) was a Serbian author, historian, translator, and professor, member of the Serbian Academy of Sciences and Arts and Academy of Sciences and Arts of the Republika Srpska. He was the elder brother of Nikola Koljević. His studies focused on South Slavic epic poetry.

== Selected works ==
- Trijumf inteligencije, Belgrade, 1963
- Humor i mit, Belgrade, 1968
- Naš junački ep, Belgrade, 1974
- Putevi reči, Sarajevo, 1978
- The Epic in the Making, Oxford, 1980
- Pripovetke Ive Andrića, Belgrade, 1983
- Viđenja i snoviđenja, Sarajevo, 1986
- Hirovi romana, Sarajevo, 1988
- Postanje epa, Novi Sad, 1998
- Njegoš u engleskoj i američkoj kulturi, Podgorica, 1999
- Engleski pesnici dvadesetog veka, Belgrade, 2002
- Engleski romansijeri dvadesetog veka, Belgrade, 2003
- Vavilonski izazovi, Novi Sad, 2007
- Odjeci reči, Belgrade, 2009
