= Historical Metallurgy Society =

British learned society

- Abbreviation: HMS
- Predecessor: Historical Metallurgy Group
- Formation: 1962; 64 years ago
- Founders: R C Benson, W I Pumphrey, and R F Tylecote
- Type: Nonprofit Limited Liability Company
- Legal status: Learned society
- Purpose: Record and document the history of metal working
- Location: Tunbridge Wells, Kent, United Kingdom
- Region served: Worldwide
- Services: Journals, news letters and organise events
- Fields: Metallurgy
- Official language: English
- Chairman: Mike Charlton
- Publication: Historical Metallurgy Journal, The Crucible news letter
- Funding: Membership fees and donations
- Website: historicalmetallurgy.org

The Historical Metallurgy Society is a British learned society providing an international forum for exchange of information and research in historical metallurgy.

The Historical Metallurgy Society publishes Historical Metallurgy an internationally recognised peer-reviewed journal, published annually in two parts. The society also issues a newsletter The Crucible three times a year, and has published edited collections based on the papers given at several of its conferences in an Occasional Papers series.

The Historical Metallurgy Society is a company limited by guarantee (no. 1442508) and a registered charity (no. 279314).

== History ==
It was founded as the Historical Metallurgy Group in 1963. All aspects of the history of metals and associated materials are covered from prehistory to the present, from processes and production through technology and economics to archaeology and conservation.

The Historical Metallurgy Society origins were partly a response to the damage and destruction of many historically important metallurgical sites. Conservation, research and protection remain important parts of the society’s role.

Each year the society holds a two-day conference (usually in the United Kingdom) with a program of papers covering a particular area of metallurgical interest. In addition to this, it also runs other day meetings.

== Notable Members ==
- Jack Nutting
- Ronald F. Tylecote
