= Šurmanci =

Šurmanci Шурманци
- Village
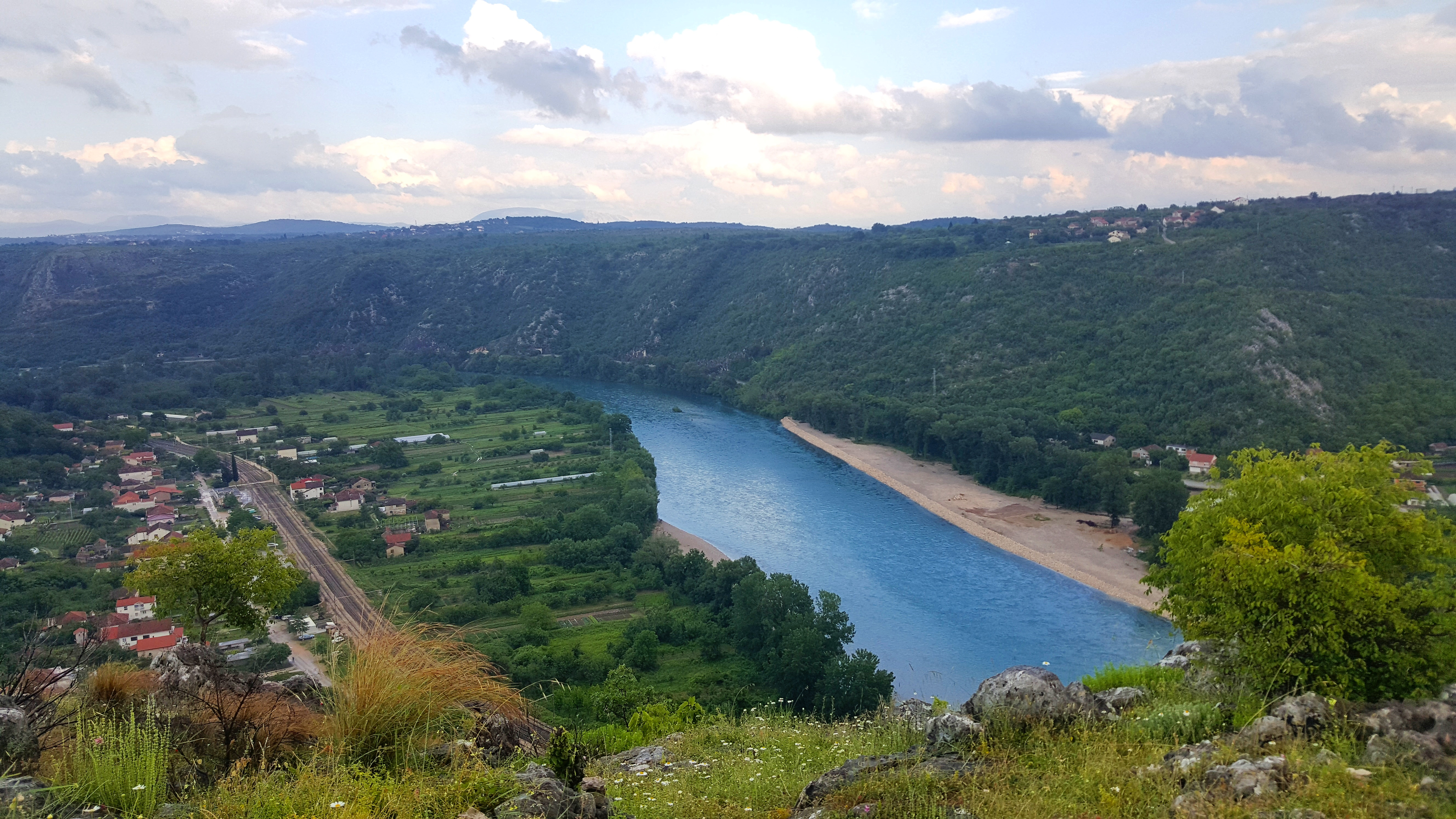

- Location within Bosnia and Herzegovina
- Coordinates: 43°09′33″N 17°45′02″E
- Country: Bosnia and Herzegovina
- Entity: Federation of Bosnia and Herzegovina
- Canton: Herzegovina-Neretva
- Municipality: Čapljina

Area
  - Total: 4.65 sq mi (12.05 km^{2})

Population (2013)
  - Total: 301
  - Density: 64.7/sq mi (25.0/km^{2})
- Time zone: UTC+1 (CET)
  - Summer (DST): UTC+2 (CEST)

Šurmanci (Serbian Cyrillic: Шурманци) is a village in Bosnia and Herzegovina. According to the 1991 census, the village is located in the municipality of Čapljina and Parish Medjugorje.

== History and people ==
Šurmanci is currently composed of about 100 households, approximately 350 people, mostly Croats (religion mostly Catholic) and Bosniaks (religion mostly Muslim). The village belongs to municipality Čapljina and Parish Medjugorje. It is home to a Merciful Jesus Church, famous for the Merciful Jesus painting, visited by thousands of pilgrims each year, who visit the village while on their pilgrimage to Medjugorje.

During the Second World War, between 530 and 550 Serbs—mostly women and children—met their deaths in this pit. The majority of those killed were from the village of Prebilovci. At the trial of the criminals, members of the Ustaše regime of the NDH (Independent State of Croatia), it was proven that from Prebilovci alone, 600 women and children perished in the pit. In 1962, the communist authorities sealed the pit with concrete.

Near the pit, on the evening of June 24, 1981, the Virgin Mary allegedly appeared to children from Medjugorje. At the request of the victims’ relatives, the pit was opened in 1990, and the remains of the victims were transferred to the crypt of the memorial church in Prebilovci. During the 1992–1995 war, the church in Prebilovci was destroyed, and the village was burned down during a military operation by the Croatian Army and the HVO, which was commanded by General Janko Bobetko.

== Demographics ==
According to the 2013 census, its population was 301.

Ethnicity in 2013
Ethnicity	Number	Percentage
Croats	287	95.3%
Bosniaks	6	2.0%
other/undeclared	8	2.7%
Total	301	100%
