= Marko Šunjić =

Bosnian historian

- Born: 15 November 1927; Mostar, Kingdom of Yugoslavia
- Died: 30 March 1998 (aged 70); Sarajevo, Bosnia and Herzegovina
- Resting place: Gradsko groblje Bare (English: City Cemetery Bare), Sarajevo
- Citizenship: Bosnia and Herzegovina
- Education: Faculty of Philosophy, University of Sarajevo
- Known for: Bosna i Venecija: odnosi u 14. i 15. stoljeću (English: Bosnia and Venice: relations in 14th and 15th century, Sarajevo 1996)
- Scientific career
- Fields: historian
- Workplaces: Faculty of Philosophy, Department of History, Sarajevo
- Thesis: Establishment and Organization of Venetian Power in Dalmatia in the 15th Century

Marko Šunjić (15 November 1927, in Mostar – 30 March 1998, in Sarajevo), was Bosnian historian, medievalist, and the member of the Academy of Sciences and Arts of Bosnia and Herzegovina (ANU BiH). He was born in Rodoč, near Mostar.

After completing primary and secondary education, he studied history at the Faculty of Philosophy in Sarajevo. He graduated in 1955. He was employed at the same faculty at the Middle Ages Department under academician Ante Babić. In 1964 he defended his doctoral thesis at the Faculty of Philosophy in Sarajevo, entitled "Establishment and Organization of Venetian Power in Dalmatia in the 15th Century". He has completed all his university vocations in General History of the Middle Ages. He was member of the Academy of Sciences and Arts of Bosnia and Herzegovina and the Croatian Society for Sciences and Arts. He was the president of the Society of Historians of Bosnia and Herzegovina, the editor of the historical journal Yearbook of the Society of Historians of Bosnia and Herzegovina, and the journal of culture Papers of the Croatian Society for Science and Art. He was a member of the editorial boards of the Contributions of the Institute of History and the Review both in Sarajevo, and Most in Mostar.

The subject of Marko Šunjić's study is the history of Bosnia and Dalmatia in the Middle Ages, and the general history of the early Middle Ages in Bosnia. He has published four books and about 100 scientific and professional papers, reviews and retrospects.

== Bibliography ==
Bibliography of Marko Šunjić.

=== Books ===
- Dalmacija u XV. stoljeću, Svjetlost, Sarajevo 1967;
- Hrestomatija izvora za opštu istoriju srednjeg vijeka, Svjetlost, Sarajevo 1980;
- Bosna i Venecija (odnosi u XIV. i XV. st.), Hrvatsko kulturno društvo Napredak, Sarajevo 1996;
- Narodi i države ranog srednjeg vijeka, Rabic, Sarajevo 2003.

=== Articles, discussions, contributions, papers, notes ===
This list is incomplete.

1. Jajce (Historija), Enciklopedija Jugoslavije IV, Jugoslavenski leksikografski zavod, 1. izdanje, Zagreb 1960, 447-448. #Jedan novi podatak o gostu Radinu i njegovoj sekti, Godišnjak Društva historičara Bosne i Hercegovine 11 (1960), Sarajevo 1961, 265-268.
2. Prilozi za istoriju bosansko - venecijanskih odnosa 1420-1463, Historijski zbornik 14, Zagreb 1961, 119-145.
3. Đuzepe (Giuseppe) Praga i njegov rad na dalmatinskoj istoriji, Godišnjak Društva istoričara Bosne i Hercegovine 11 (1960), Sarajevo 1961, 328-338.
4. Bilješka o državnom arhivu u Veneciji, Glasnik arhiva i Društva arhivskih radnika Bosne i Hercegovine 1, Sarajevo 1961, 214-216.
5. Stipendiarii Veneti u Dalmaciji i Dalmatinci kao mletački plaćenici u XV. vijeku, Godišnjak Društva historičara Bosne i Hercegovine 13 (1962), Sarajevo 1963, 251-288.
6. Nekoliko podataka o srednjovjekovnim bosanskim izrađevinama od srebra, Radovi Filozofskog fakulteta I (1963), Sarajevo 1963, 345-348.
7. Političke prilike u mletačkoj Dalmaciji XV. stoljeća, Radovi Filozofskog fakulteta II (1964), Sarajevo 1964, 281-308.
8. Pomjeranje mletačkih granica u Dalmaciji i odnosi sa susjedima tokom XV. stoljeća, Godišnjak Društva historičara Bosne i Hercegovine 15 (1964), Sarajevo 1966, 47-62.

=== Prikazi, reviews, retrospectives, other ===
This list is incomplete.

1. H. Pirenne, Srednjeveška mesta, Ljubljana 1956, Godišnjak Društva istoričara Bosne i Hercegovine 9 (1957), Sarajevo 1958, 313-316.
2. Hans Planitz, Die Deitsche Stadt im Mittelalter (von Römerzeit bis zu den 2. Zunftkämpfen), Böhlau-Verlag, Graz-Köln, 1954, Godišnjak Društva istoričara Bosne i Hercegovine 9 (1957), Sarajevo 1958, 316-317.
3. Justus Hashagen, Europa im Mittelalter, Verlag E. Bruckman, München 1951, 3. Godišnjak Društva istoričara Bosne i Hercegovine 9 (1957), Sarajevo 1958, 318-321.
4. Grga Novak, Povijest Splita I, Split 1957, 4. Godišnjak Društva istoričara Bosne i Hercegovine 10 (1959), Sarajevo 1959, 397-399.
5. Godišnjak Istoriskog društva Bosne i Hercegovine IX, Sarajevo 1958, str. 338, 5. Pregled 49/4-5, Sarajevo 1959, 413-415.
6. Redovna dvogodišnja skupština Društva istoričara BiH, 6. Pregled (52)/11-12, Sarajevo 1962, 494-495.
7. Grga Novak, Povijest Splita II (1420-1797), MH, Split 1961. str. 560, 7. Godišnjak Društva istoričara Bosne i Hercegovine 13 (1962), Sarajevo 1963, 387-388.
8. Sima M. Ćirković, Herceg Stefan Vukčić-Kosača i njegovo doba, Posebna izdanja 8. SAN, knj. 386, Beograd 1964, Godišnjak Društva istoričara Bosne i Hercegovine 15 (1964), Sarajevo 1966, 271-275.
9. M. Dinić, Humsko-trebinjska vlastela, Posebna izdanja SAN, knj. 397, Beograd 9. 1967, Godišnjak Društva istoričara Bosne i Hercegovine 16 (1965), Sarajevo 1967, 292-294
