= Desanka Kovačević-Kojić =

Bosnian and Yugoslav historian (1925–2022)

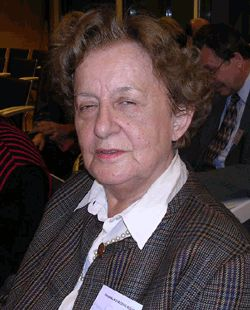
- Born: 3 October 1925
- Died: 13 August 2022 (aged 96)

Desanka Kovačević-Kojić (Serbian Cyrillic: Десанка Ковачевић-Којић; 3 October 1925 – 13 August 2022) was a Yugoslav, Bosnian and Serbian medievalist, specialized in the medieval history of Serbia and Bosnia, and in particular urban history, trade and commercial relations.

She left Sarajevo in 1993, after the Siege of Sarajevo had been imposed on her hometown and the Bosnian War was in full swing at that point. She settled in Belgrade, in Serbia, where she continued her work until her death.

Desanka Kovačević-Kojić studied history at the Faculty of Philosophy of the University of Belgrade, graduating in 1950. She was professor at the University of Sarajevo, and since 1993 has worked in the Institute for History in Belgrade. During the 1960s, she spent a year with Radovan Samardžić in Paris, specializing in history at the seminary of Fernand Braudel. She has published several monographs and more than a hundred studies and articles in Serbian and French. She was a member of the ANUBiH, and after moving to Belgrade in 1993, she also became a member of the Serbian Academy of Science and Arts.

She died on 13 August 2022, at the age of 96.

== Selected works ==
- “Trgovina u srednjovjekovnoj Bosni”, Naučno društvo Bosne i Hercegovine, Djela 18, Odjeljenje istorijsko-filoloških nauka 13, Sarajevo 1961.
- Gradska naselja srednjovjekovne bosanske države, Veselin Masleša, Sarajevo 1978;
- Trgovačke knjige braće Kabužić (Caboga) 1426–1433, Spomenik SANU 137, Odeljenje istorijskih nauka 11, Serbian Academy of Sciences and Arts, Beograd 1999.
- Srednjovjekovna Srebrenica XIV-XV vijek, Srpska akademija nauka i umetnosti, Beograd 2010. ISBN 978-86-7025-529-6
- Gradski život u Srbiji i Bosni (XIV-XV vijek), Istorijski institut, Studia Historica Collecta, Knjiga 2, Beograd 2007. 978-86-7743-059-7
- La Serbie et les pays serbes : l'économie urbaine, XIVe-XVe siècles; Institut des Etudes balkaniques, ASSA. Belgrade 2012 ISBN 978-86-17-18055-1
