= Adam Šukalo =

Serbian politician

Adam Šukalo (Serbian Cyrillic: Адам Шукало; born 2 September 1978) is a Bosnian Serb politician. He served in the National Assembly of the Republika Srpska from 2014 to 2018 as a member of Napredna Srpska. He subsequently relocated to Belgrade, Serbia, and has served in the National Assembly of Serbia since 2020 as a member of the Serbian Progressive Party (Srpska napredna stranka, SNS).

== Early life and career ==
Šukalo was born in Gradiška, in what was then the Socialist Republic of Bosnia and Herzegovina in the Socialist Federal Republic of Yugoslavia. He later moved to Banja Luka. Šukalo holds a Bachelor of Laws degree.

== Politician ==
=== Republika Srpska ===
Šukalo was the leader of the Serbian Progressive Party of Republika Srpska in the early 2010s, when the party was aligned with the Progressive Party in Serbia. He was a Progressive candidate in the 2010 Republika Srpska general election, in which the party did not cross the electoral threshold to win representation in the assembly. The Republika Srpska Progressives subsequently became divided between different factions and Šukalo became the leader of a new party called Napredna Srpska (English: "Progressive Srpska") following a split in 2013.

Napredna Srpska contested the 2014 Republika Srpska general election on an electoral list led by the Democratic People's Alliance (Demokratski narodni savez, DNS), and Šukalo was elected to the assembly after being awarded a compensatory mandate under the Republika Srpska's system of proportional representation. Following the election, Šukalo called for a "grand coalition" government between the two largest parties, the rival Alliance of Independent Social Democrats (Savez nezavisnih socijaldemokrata, SNSD) and Serb Democratic Party (Srpska demokratska stranka, SDS). In so doing, he suggested the prospect of Napredna Srpska acting as a bridge between the parties. This ultimately did not occur; the DNS joined a coalition government led by the SNSD, and Napredna Srpska became part of the Alliance for Change, a coalition of opposition parties.

In 2017, Šukalo called for stronger inter-communal relations in Bosnia and Herzegovina and identified both Republika Srpska president Milorad Dodik and Party of Democratic Action leader Bakir Izetbegović as obstacles to progress.

Šukalo was replaced as leader of Naprenda Srpska by Goran Đorđić in March 2017. This occurred against the backdrop of merger negotiations with the Party of Democratic Progress (Partija demokratskog progresa, PDP). Šukalo subsequently announced that he would sit in caucus with the PDP as an independent member.

During his time in the Republika Srpska assembly, Šukalo was a frequent critic of the Dodik administration and was known for his verbal battles with interior minister Dragan Lukač. He was also a prominent member of the "Justice of David" movement, calling for an investigation into the death of David Dragičević. He served on the Committee for European integration and regional cooperation. and

He sought election to the House of Representatives of Bosnia and Herzegovina in the 2018 Bosnian general election on the PDP's electoral list and was narrowly defeated.

=== Member of the National Assembly of Serbia ===
Šukalo received the 125th position on the Serbian Progressive Party's Aleksandar Vučić — For Our Children coalition list in the 2020 Serbian parliamentary election and was elected when the list won a landslide majority with 188 out of 250 mandates. He is now a member of the committee on administrative, budgetary, mandate, and immunity issues; a deputy member of the European integration committee and the committee on constitutional and legislative issues; a substitute member of Serbia's delegation to the Parliamentary Dimension of the Central European Initiative; and a member of the parliamentary friendship groups with Azerbaijan, Bosnia and Herzegovina, Brazil, Cuba, Germany, Greece, Italy, Montenegro, North Macedonia, Russia, Spain, and the United States of America.

== Election results ==
=== Republika Srpska ===
2018 Bosnia and Herzegovina State House of Representatives election results: Republika Srpska, Division One

Party	Votes	%	Mandates
Alliance of Independent Social Democrats	116,915	40.01	1 + 2
Party of Democratic Progress	53,406	18.27	1 + 1
SDS–NDP–NS–SRS	52,365	17.92	1
Democratic People's Alliance	30,934	10.58	
Socialist Party	13,399	4.58	
Party of Democratic Action	9,967	3.41	
Social Democratic Party of Bosnia and Herzegovina	4,493	1.54	
First Serb Democratic Party	3,485	1.19	
Serbian Progressive Party of Republika Srpska	2,743	0.94	
HDZ–HSS–HKDU–HSP-HNS–HSP-AS BiH–HDU BiH	2,378	0.81	
Union for a Better Future of BiH	1,394	0.48	
Party of Democratic Activity	443	0.15	
Lijevo Krilo	322	0.11	
Total valid votes	292,244	100.00	

Party of Democratic Progress candidate preference votes
Ballot #	Name	Votes	Notes
1	Branislav Borenović	24,164	Elected
3	Adam Šukalo	20,927	
2	Mira Pekić	2,984	Awarded compensatory mandate
4	Dijana Ješić	3,599	
5	Mladen Kulundžija	2,922	
6	Dragana Đukić	2,444	
7	Saša Čekrlja	2,888	
8	Vlastimir Vidić	2,001	

Source: Verified results of the 2018 General Election, Central Election Committee of Bosnia and Herzegovina.

2014 Republika Srpska National Assembly election results: Division Two

Party	Votes	%	Mandates
Alliance of Independent Social Democrats	30,154	40.85	3
SDS–PUP–SRS RS	21,318	28.88	2
Party of Democratic Progress	4,974	6.74	1
DNS-NS-SRS	4,791	6.49	1 + 1
National Democratic Movement	3,297	4.47	
Homeland	2,684	3.64	
Socialist Party	2,050	2.78	+ 1
Serbian Progressive Party of Republika Srpska	1,286	1.74	
Fair Policy Party	1,067	1.45	
Social Democratic Party of Bosnia and Herzegovina	851	1.15	
For Justice and Red List	479	0.65	
Peasant Party	429	0.58	
Fighters for a New Politics	212	0.29	
HDZ–HSS–HKDU–HSP HB	100	0.14	
Party of Economic and Social Justice	87	0.12	
Croatian Democratic Union 1990	29	0.04	
Total valid votes	73,808	100.00	

Democratic People's Alliance–Napredna Stranka–Serbian Radical Party Dr. Vojislav Šešelj candidate preference votes
Ballot #	Name	Votes	Notes
3	Goran Đorđić	1,540	Elected
4	Vladimir Janković	1,216	
5	Zorica Jusupović	1,116	
1	Nebojša Ličanin	822	
7	Milorad Kondić	458	
9	Sanja Bajić	311	
12	Adam Šukalo	260	Awarded compensatory mandate
11	Branka Malbašić	253	
2	Vera Jelić	177	
6	Ognjen Vučen	202	
8	Milena Majstorović	55	
10	Dušan Marić	173	

Source: Verified results of the 2014 General Election, Central Election Committee of Bosnia and Herzegovina.

2010 Republika Srpska National Assembly election results: Division One

Party	Votes	%	Mandates
Alliance of Independent Social Democrats	55,509	39.67	6 + 1
Serb Democratic Party	22,751	16.26	3
Democratic People's Alliance	13,367	9.55	1 + 1
Party of Democratic Progress	10,472	7.48	1 + 1
Social Democratic Party of Bosnia and Herzegovina	5,121	3.66	1
Party of Democratic Action	4,521	3.23	1
Party for Bosnia and Herzegovina	4,123	2.95	
Democratic Party of Republika Srpska	4,074	2.91	
Serbian Radical Party of Republika Srpska	4,018	2.87	
Serbian Progressive Party of Republika Srpska	3,369	2.41	
Socialist Party–Party of United Pensioners	3,067	2.19	
National Democratic Party	2,821	2.02	
Our Party–New Socialist Party	1,841	1.32	
Serbian Radical Party Dr. Vojislav Šešelj	1,725	1.23	
Union for a Better Future of BiH	1,312	0.94	
Alliance for Serbian Democracy	717	0.51	
People's Party for Work and Betterment	462	0.33	
Croatian Democratic Union of Bosnia and Herzegovina	251	0.18	
Democratic People's Union	160	0.11	
Ecological Party	125	0.09	
Croatian Coalition	80	0.06	
Liberal Democratic Party–European Ecological Party E-5	33	0.02	
Total valid votes	139,919	100.00	

Serbian Progressive Party of Republika Srpska candidate preference votes
Ballot #	Name	Votes	Notes
1	Adam Šukalo	1,387	
5	Željko Blagojević	797	
3	Stanko Vujković	568	
17	Nevenka Glišić	290	
16	Dejan Stanišljević	276	
2	Nada Milovanović	255	
15	Milan Popović	243	
9	Jovo Biga	206	
4	Sanja Kovačević	142	
6	Radovan Bratić	66	
7	Teodor Vučić	142	
8	Tanja Nedimović	76	
10	Drago Mastikosa	114	
11	Slavica Savanović	88	
12	Aleksandar Kukobat	67	
13	Svetislav Kuzmanović	123	
14	Gordana Kragulj	89	
18	Slobodan Tuta	133	

Source: Verified results of the 2010 General Election, Central Election Committee of Bosnia and Herzegovina.
