= 2010 Republika Srpska general election =

Bosnian subnational election

← 2007	3 October 2010	2014 →
- Presidential election
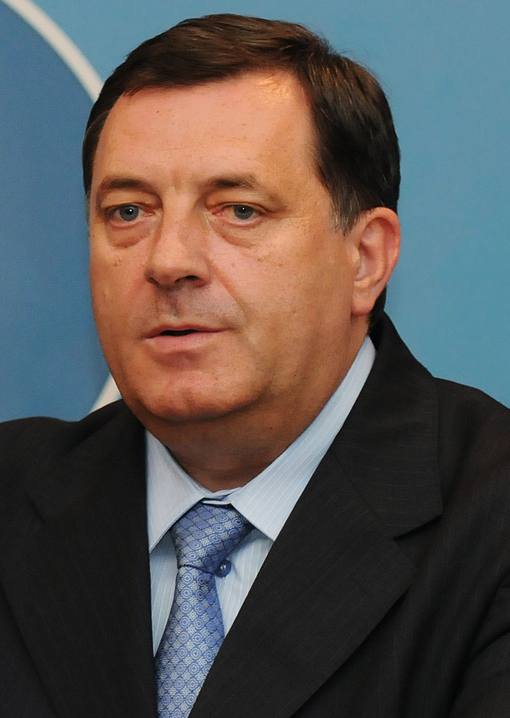

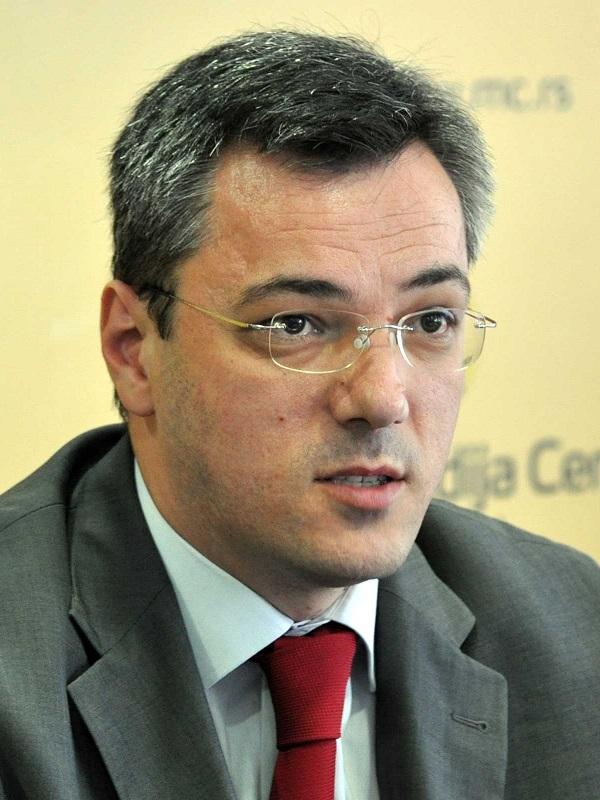
Candidate	Milorad Dodik	Ognjen Tadić
Party	SNSD	Together for Srpska
Popular vote	319,618	227,239
Percentage	50.52%	35.92%
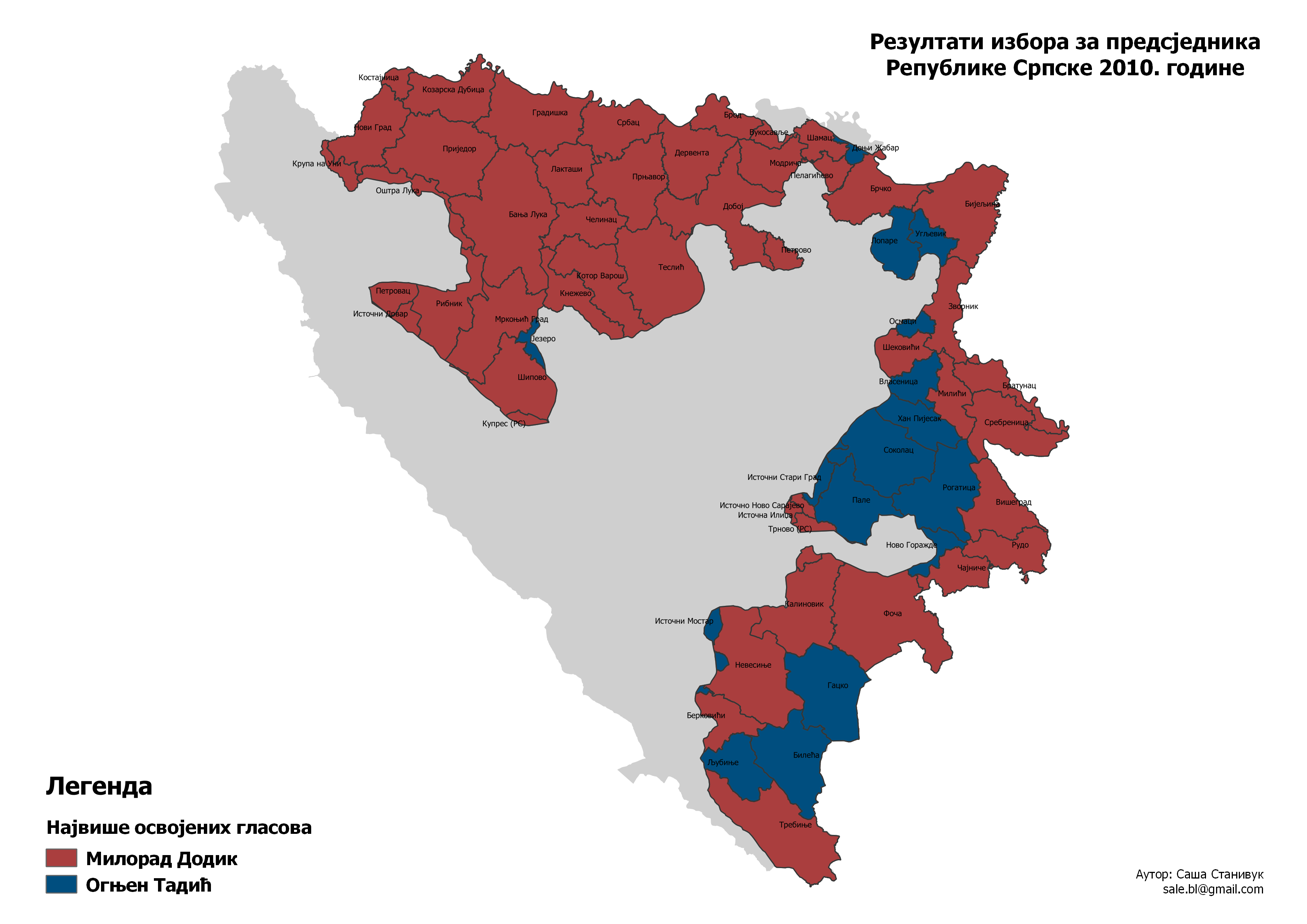
- Results by municipality.
President before election
Rajko Kuzmanović
SNSD
Elected President
Milorad Dodik
SNSD
- National Assembly election
- 83 seats in the National Assembly; 42 seats needed for a majority
Party	Leader	Vote %	Seats	+/–
SNSD	Milorad Dodik	38.00	37	−4
SDS	Mladen Bosić	18.97	18	+1
PDP	Mladen Ivanić	7.55	7	−1
DNS	Marko Pavić	6.09	6	+2
SP	Petar Đokić	4.23	4	+1
DP	Dragan Čavić	3.41	3	New
SDP BiH	Zlatko Lagumdžija	3.05	3	+2
SDA	Sulejman Tihić	2.66	2	−1
SRS RS	Milanko Mihajlica	2.39	1	−1
NDS	Krsto Jandrić	2.12	2	+2
This lists parties that won seats. See the complete results below.
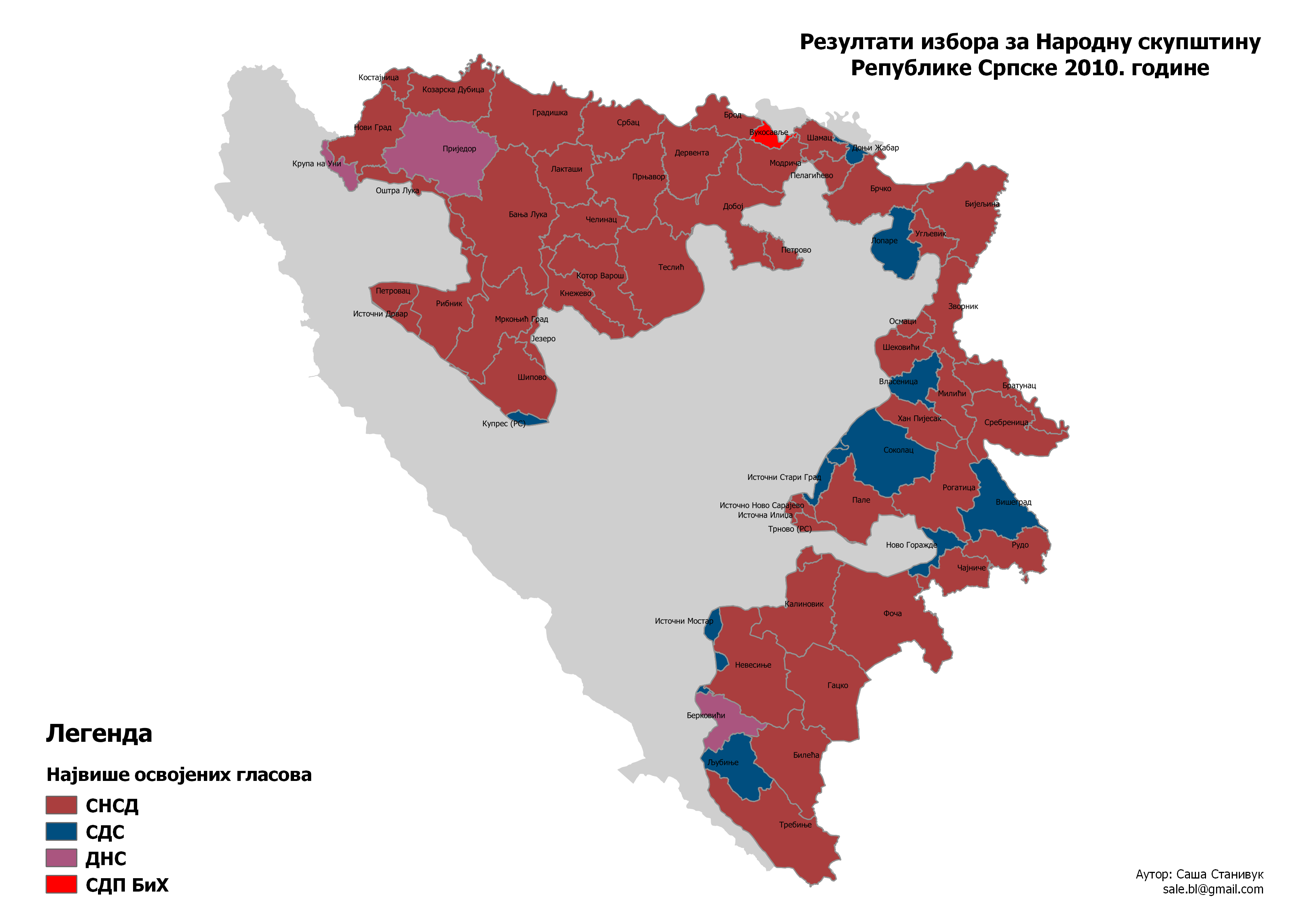
Colours denote the party with the most votes by municipalities.
Prime Minister before	Prime Minister after
Milorad Dodik; SNSD	Aleksandar Džombić; SNSD

General elections were held in Republika Srpska on 3 October 2010, as part of the general elections across Bosnia and Herzegovina. The presidential elections were won by Milorad Dodik of the Alliance of Independent Social Democrats.

== Results ==
=== President ===
Candidate	Party	Votes	%
Milorad Dodik	Alliance of Independent Social Democrats	319,618	50.52
Ognjen Tadić	Together for Srpska	227,239	35.92
Enes Suljkanović	Social Democratic Party	15,425	2.44
Ševket Hafizović	Party of Democratic Action	14,843	2.35
Muharem Murselović	Party for Bosnia and Herzegovina	14,177	2.24
Dragan Đurđević	Serbian Radical Party "Dr. Vojislav Šešelj"	8,178	1.29
Emil Vlajki	National Democratic Party	6,101	0.96
Sadmir Nukić	Union for a Better Future of BiH	5,565	0.88
Ivan Krndelj	Croatian Peasant Party	5,487	0.87
Ivo Kamenjašević	Croatian Democratic Union	4,128	0.65
Dragan Kalinić	Alliance for Srpska Democracy	4,043	0.64
Besim Hamidović	Party of Democratic Action	1,605	0.25
Željko Matić	Croatian Coalition	1,199	0.19
Agan Delibajrić	Bosnian-Herzegovinian Patriotic Party	1,185	0.19
Dragan Mrgan	People's Party Work for Prosperity	1,006	0.16
Goran Matić	Independent	980	0.15
Ljiljana Knežević	Turnaround Coalition (GDS–NEP)	809	0.13
Bego Sulejmanović	LDS–EES E-5	684	0.11
Slavko Dragičević	Social Democratic Union	402	0.06
Total		632,674	100.00
Valid votes		632,674	94.32
Invalid/blank votes		38,082	5.68
Total votes		670,756	100.00
Source: Central Elections Citizens committee

=== National Assembly ===
Party	Votes	%	Seats			
Party	Votes	%	Direct	Compensatory	Total	+/–
Alliance of Independent Social Democrats	240,727	38.00	28	9	37	–4
Serb Democratic Party	120,136	18.97	14	4	18	+1
Party of Democratic Progress	47,806	7.55	5	2	7	–1
Democratic People's Alliance	38,547	6.09	4	2	6	+2
Socialist Party–Party of United Pensioners	26,824	4.23	3	1	4	+1
Democratic Party	21,604	3.41	1	2	3	New
Social Democratic Party	19,297	3.05	2	1	3	+2
Party of Democratic Action	16,861	2.66	2	0	2	–1
Serbian Radical Party	15,166	2.39	1	0	1	–1
Serbian Radical Party "Dr. Vojislav Šešelj"	13,731	2.17	0	0	0	0
National Democratic Party	13,440	2.12	2	0	2	+2
Party for Bosnia and Herzegovina	11,952	1.89	0	0	0	–4
Serb Progressive Party	11,384	1.80	0	0	0	New
Our Party	10,010	1.58	0	0	0	New
Alliance for Srpska Democracy	7,004	1.11	0	0	0	New
Union for a Better Future of BiH	5,744	0.91	0	0	0	New
Croatian Peasant Party	4,100	0.65	0	0	0	0
Croatian Democratic Union	2,833	0.45	0	0	0	0
People's Party Work for Prosperity	2,528	0.40	0	0	0	0
Ecological Party	1,031	0.16	0	0	0	New
Croatian Coalition	866	0.14	0	0	0	0
Bosnian-Herzegovinian Patriotic Party	478	0.08	0	0	0	0
Democratic People's Union	329	0.05	0	0	0	0
Party of Democratic Activity	323	0.05	0	0	0	New
Kokuza Party	234	0.04	0	0	0	New
LDS–EES E-5	162	0.03	0	0	0	0
Bosnian Party	141	0.02	0	0	0	0
Straight Way Party	49	0.01	0	0	0	New
Democratic Party of the Disabled	46	0.01	0	0	0	New
Social Democratic Union	44	0.01	0	0	0	New
Independent Democratic Party	16	0.00	0	0	0	0
Independents	16	0.00	0	0	0	0
Total	633,429	100.00	62	21	83	0
Valid votes	633,429	94.44				
Invalid/blank votes	37,301	5.56				
Total votes	670,730	100.00				
Source: CEC
