= NDP =

NDP may stand for:

== Computing ==
- Neighbor Discovery Protocol, an Internet protocol
- Nortel Discovery Protocol, a layer two Internet protocol, also called SONMP
- Nondeterministic programming, a type of computer language

== Government ==
- National Development Plan, in Ireland
- National Development Policy, in Malaysia
- Norwegian Petroleum Directorate, agency responsible for the regulation of Norwegian oil resources

== Political parties ==
- Nagaland Democratic Party, India (1999–2004)
- National Defence Party (disambiguation), any of several parties
- National Democratic and Labour Party, United Kingdom (1918–1923)
- National Democratic Movement (Bosnia and Herzegovina)
- National Democratic Party (disambiguation), any of several parties
- Nebraska Democratic Party, U.S.
- New Democratic Party (disambiguation), any of several parties, most notably in Canada
- Newfoundland Democratic Party (1959)
- Nuclear Disarmament Party, Australia (1984–2009)
- National Development Party (disambiguation), any of several parties

=== Other disambiguations ===
- National Democrats (disambiguation)
- Democratic National Party (disambiguation)

== Other ==
- National Day of Prayer, an annual US observance on the first Thursday of May
- NDP (gene), Norrie disease protein
- Neodymium phosphide, a compound with the chemical formula NdP
- Net domestic product, an economic quantity
- New Douglas Park, a football stadium which is the home of Scottish Premiership side Hamilton Academical F.C.
- Northumberland Development Project, a proposed football stadium and commercial development in Tottenham, London
- Northern Dutchess Paramedics, an advanced life support ambulance service in the Hudson Valley of New York
- Notre-Dame de Paris
- National Day Parade, an annual parade in Singapore celebrating the independence of the country
- Neutron depth profiling, an analytical technique for measuring isotopic mass in near surface of samples
