= Vladimir Mandić (handballer) =

Serbian former handball player and businessman

Personal information
- Nationality: Serbian
- Born: 10 February 1980 (age 46) Sarajevo, SFR Yugoslavia
- Height: 2.02 m (6 ft 8 in)

Sport
- Sport: Handball
- Position: Left back
- Number: 1

Youth career
- Years: Team
- –: Crvena zvezda

Senior clubs
- Years: Team
- 1995–1997: Crvena zvezda
- 1997–2004: Partizan
- 2004: SC Magdeburg
- 2005: Vojvodina
- 2006: Altea
- 2008: Vojvodina
- 2010–2011: Vojvodina
- 2011–2012: Partizan
- 2014: Partizan
National team
- Years: Team
- –: FR Yugoslavia

Vladimir Mandić (Serbian Cyrillic: Владимир Мандић; born 10 February 1980) is a Serbian former handball player and businessman. A member of the main board of the ruling populist Serbian Progressive Party (SNS), Mandić is considered to be the man in charge of the "confidential affairs" of the party.

== Career ==
Mandić was born on 10 February 1980 in Sarajevo, SR Bosnia and Herzegovina, SFR Yugoslavia. He moved to Belgrade in the early 1990s.

=== Club ===
He started his career in Crvena zvezda (Red Star) where he was a champion with cadets, juniors and seniors. From Crvena zvezda he moved to their rival Partizan. Then numerous titles followed. Already in 1998, he won the national cup, and the following year the championship of FR Yugoslavia. Two years later, with Partizan, he won the Cup again, and in 2002 and 2003, he became national champion twice in a row.

In 2004, he signed for Magdeburg, with whom he played in the semi-finals of the EHF Champions League. After Magdeburg, he returned to Serbian handball and signed for Vojvodina, with which he became the champion of Serbia and Montenegro in the 2004/05 season. In 2006, he played for Altea, but soon left the club and took a break in his handball career due to family problems. He returned to handball and signed for Vojvodina once again, with which he won the Serbian Cup in the 2010/11 season.

In May 2011, he announced that he was returning to Partizan for the 2011/12 season. Season 2011/12 was extremely successful for Partizan, with whom Mandić won the Championship, Cup and Supercup of Serbia and participated in the group stage of the Champions League. After a great season in which he won three trophies, Mandic announced that he was retiring. In January 2014, he returned to handball and joined Partizan in the desire to help the club win the title. However, that season, Partizan did not manage to win the title, and Mandić definitely decided to retire.

=== International ===
Mandić played for the FR Yugoslavia national team at the 2003 World Championship in Portugal. In total, he played 45 games for the national team.

== Business and political activities ==
Following his retirement from handball, Mandić became a successful businessman. Mandić is a member of the main board of the ruling populist Serbian Progressive Party (SNS) and considered to be the man in charge of the "confidential affairs" of the party, such as dispersal of protests and rallies of opposition parties in Serbia.

During the local elections campaign in Nikšić, Montenegro, in February 2021, Mandić was detained along with eight other people after he was allegedly involved in the pre-election campaign in Nikšić and logistically and financially helping the "For the Future of Nikšić" coalition. In late September 2022, prior to the Republika Srpska general election, Mandić was detained in Banja Luka along with Adam Šukalo, also a high-ranking member of SNS. They were released from custody shortly after. It has been alleged that their arrest was directly ordered by Milorad Dodik, presidency member of Bosnia and Herzegovina and president of the Alliance of Independent Social Democrats (SNSD), as Mandić and Šukalo were allegedly organizing vote buying on behalf of the opposition in Republika Srpska under the orders of Aleksandar Vučić in order to topple Dodik. He was banned entry to Montenegro on 14 October 2022 for "national security reasons".

== Personal life ==
His father Momčilo is an influential business and political figure and served as justice minister of Republika Srpska in 1992 during the Bosnian War. Momčilo Mandić was elected member of the National Assembly of Serbia in the 2016 parliamentary election on the electoral list of the ultranationalist Serbian Radical Party (SRS).

Mandić has four children.

=== 2002 attempted murder charge ===
He was accused of assisting in the attempted murder of his father's former driver Dejan Marković in 2002. According to the indictment, Mandić lured Dejan Marković, the former driver of his father Momčilo Mandić to Ušće where his cousin Draženko Mandić wounded him. In 2016, the Court of Appeal acquitted Mandić of attempted murder.
