= Outline of Republika Srpska =

Overview of and topical guide to Republika Srpska

The Flag of Republika Srpska

The Seal of Republika Srpska

The following outline is provided as an overview of and topical guide to Republika Srpska:

Republika Srpska – unitary democratic parliamentary entity of the Western Balkans state of Bosnia and Herzegovina. Entity's population of 1.3 million, consisting of a constituent peoples: Serbs, Bosniaks, and Croats. The Serbs are most populous, and the most common religious denomination is Serbian Orthodoxy.

== General reference ==
- Common English country name: Republika Srpska
- Official English country name: Republika Srpska
- Common endonym: Republika Srpska
- Official endonym: Republika Srpska
- Etymology: Name of Republika Srpska
- International rankings of Republika Srpska
- ISO country codes: BA-SRP
- ISO region codes: See ISO 3166-2:BA
- Internet country code top-level domain: .ba

== Geography of Republika Srpska ==
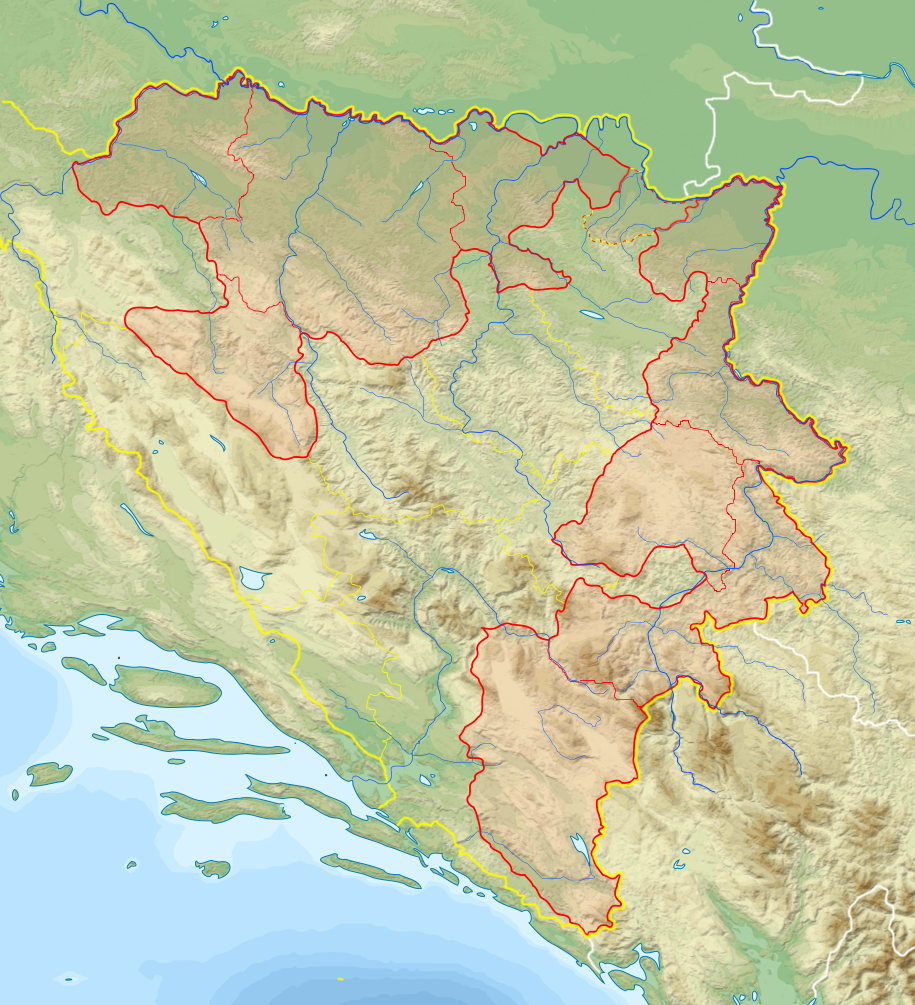
An enlargeable topographic map of Republika Srpska

- Republika Srpska is: an entity of Bosnia and Herzegovina
- Location:
  - Eastern Hemisphere
  - Northern Hemisphere
    - Eurasia
      - Europe
        - Southern Europe
          - Balkans (also known as "Southeastern Europe")
  - Time zone: Central European Time (UTC+01), Central European Summer Time (UTC+02)
  - Extreme points of Republika Srpska
    - High: Maglić 2,386 m (7,828 ft)
  - Land boundaries: 2,170 km

internal entity boundary
Federation of Bosnia and Herzegovina 1,150 km
as part of Bosnia and Herzegovina international border
Croatia 369 km
Serbia 357 km
Montenegro 294 km

- Population of Republika Srpska: 1,326,991
- Area of Republika Srpska: 24,857 km^{2} (9,597 sq mi)
- Atlas of Republika Srpska

=== Environment of Republika Srpska ===
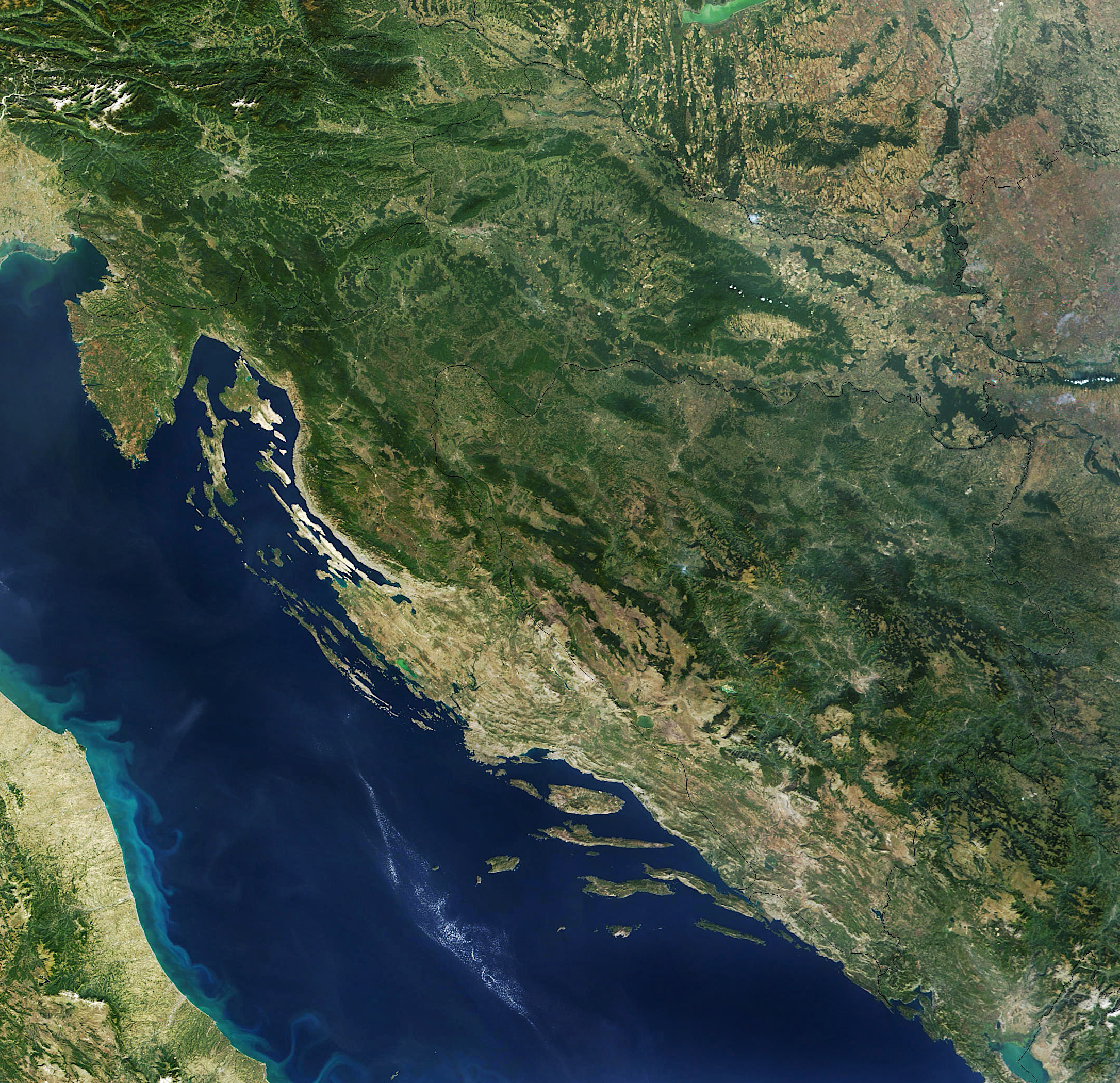
An enlargeable satellite image of Republika Srpska

- Climate of Republika Srpska
- Renewable energy in Republika Srpska
- Geology of Republika Srpska
- Protected areas of Republika Srpska
  - Biosphere reserves in Republika Srpska
  - National parks of Republika Srpska
- Wildlife of Republika Srpska
  - Fauna of Republika Srpska
    - Birds of Republika Srpska
    - Mammals of Republika Srpska

==== Natural geographic features of Republika Srpska ====
- Lakes of Republika Srpska
- Mountains of Republika Srpska
- Rivers of Republika Srpska
- World Heritage Sites in Republika Srpska

=== Regions of Republika Srpska ===
Regions of Republika Srpska

- Bosanska Krajina
- East Herzegovina
- Podrinje
- Posavina
- Romanija
- Pousorje

==== Administrative divisions of Republika Srpska ====
Administrative divisions of Republika Srpska

- Municipalities of Republika Srpska
- Regions of Republika Srpska

===== Municipalities of Republika Srpska =====
- Cities of Republika Srpska

=== Demography of Republika Srpska ===
- Serbs of Bosnia and Herzegovina
- Bosniaks of Bosnia and Herzegovina
- Croats of Bosnia and Herzegovina

== Government and politics of Republika Srpska ==
- Form of government: parliamentary representative democratic republic
- Capital of Republika Srpska: Sarajevo
- Elections in Republika Srpska
  - Republika Srpska general election, 2002
  - Republika Srpska general election, 2006
  - Republika Srpska presidential election, 2007
  - Republika Srpska general election, 2010
  - Republika Srpska general election, 2010
- Political parties in Republika Srpska

=== Branches of government ===
==== Executive branch of the government of Republika Srpska ====
- Head of state: President of Republika Srpska, Milorad Dodik (2010-)
- Head of government: Prime Minister of Republika Srpska, Željka Cvijanović (2013-)
- Government of Republika Srpska

==== Legislative branch of the government of Republika Srpska ====
- People's Assembly (unicameral)

==== Judicial branch of the government of Republika Srpska ====
- Constitutional Court of Republika Srpska
- Supreme Court of Republika Srpska

=== Foreign relations of Republika Srpska ===
- Diplomatic missions in Republika Srpska
- Diplomatic missions of Republika Srpska

=== Law and order in Republika Srpska ===
Law of Republika Srpska

- Capital punishment in Republika Srpska
- Constitution of Republika Srpska
- Crime in Republika Srpska
- Human rights in Republika Srpska
  - LGBT rights in Republika Srpska
  - Freedom of religion in Republika Srpska
- Law enforcement in Republika Srpska

== History of Republika Srpska ==
- Military history of Republika Srpska

== Culture of Republika Srpska ==
- Architecture of Republika Srpska
- Cuisine of Republika Srpska
- Ethnic minorities in Republika Srpska
- Festivals in Republika Srpska
- Languages of Republika Srpska
- Media in Republika Srpska
- Museums in Republika Srpska
- National symbols of Republika Srpska
  - Seal of Republika Srpska
  - Flag of Republika Srpska
  - National anthem of Republika Srpska
- People of Republika Srpska
- Prostitution in Republika Srpska
- Public holidays in Republika Srpska
- Records of Republika Srpska
- Religion in Republika Srpska
  - Orthodoxy in Republika Srpska
  - Islam in Republika Srpska
  - Catholicism in Republika Srpska
  - Judaism in Republika Srpska
  - Buddhism in Republika Srpska
- World Heritage Sites in Republika Srpska

=== Art in Republika Srpska ===
- Art of Republika Srpska
- Cinema of Republika Srpska
- Literature in Republika Srpska
- Music of Republika Srpska
- Television in Republika Srpska
- Theatre in Republika Srpska

=== Sports in Republika Srpska ===
Sports in Republika Srpska

- Football in Republika Srpska
  - Republika Srpska national football team

== Economy and infrastructure of Republika Srpska ==
- Agriculture in Republika Srpska
- Banking in Republika Srpska
  - Banks in Republika Srpska
- Communications in Republika Srpska
  - Internet in Republika Srpska
- Companies of Republika Srpska
- Energy in Republika Srpska
  - Energy policy of Republika Srpska
  - Oil industry in Republika Srpska
- Health care in Republika Srpska
- Mining in Republika Srpska
- Banja Luka Stock Exchange
- Tourism in Republika Srpska
- Transportation in Republika Srpska
  - Airports in Republika Srpska
  - Rail transport in Republika Srpska
  - Roads in Republika Srpska
    - Highways in Republika Srpska
    - State routes in Republika Srpska

== Education in Republika Srpska ==
- List of schools in Republika Srpska
  - List of high schools in Republika Srpska
- Institutions of higher education in Republika Srpska
  - University of Banja Luka
  - University of Istočno Sarajevo
  - University of Bijeljina

== See also ==
- Index of Republika Srpska-related articles
- List of Republika Srpska-related topics
- List of international rankings
- Outline of Europe
- Outline of geography
