= NDM =

NDM may refer to:

- National Democratic Movement (disambiguation)
  - National Democratic Movement (Bosnia and Herzegovina)
  - National Democratic Movement (Guatemala)
  - National Democratic Movement (Jamaica)
  - National Democratic Movement (Pakistan)
- National Moravian-Silesian Theatre (Czech: Národní divadlo moravskoslezské; NDM), Ostrava Czech Republic
- Naturalistic decision-making, in psychology
- Ndam language (ISO 639:ndm)
- Neonatal diabetes mellitus
- New Deal Movement, a political party in Liberia
- New Delhi metallo-beta-lactamase 1, an enzyme
- Network Data Mover, original name of Connect:Direct software
- Non-denominational Muslim
