= 2014 Republika Srpska general election =

Bosnian subnational election

- 12 October 2014
- Presidential election
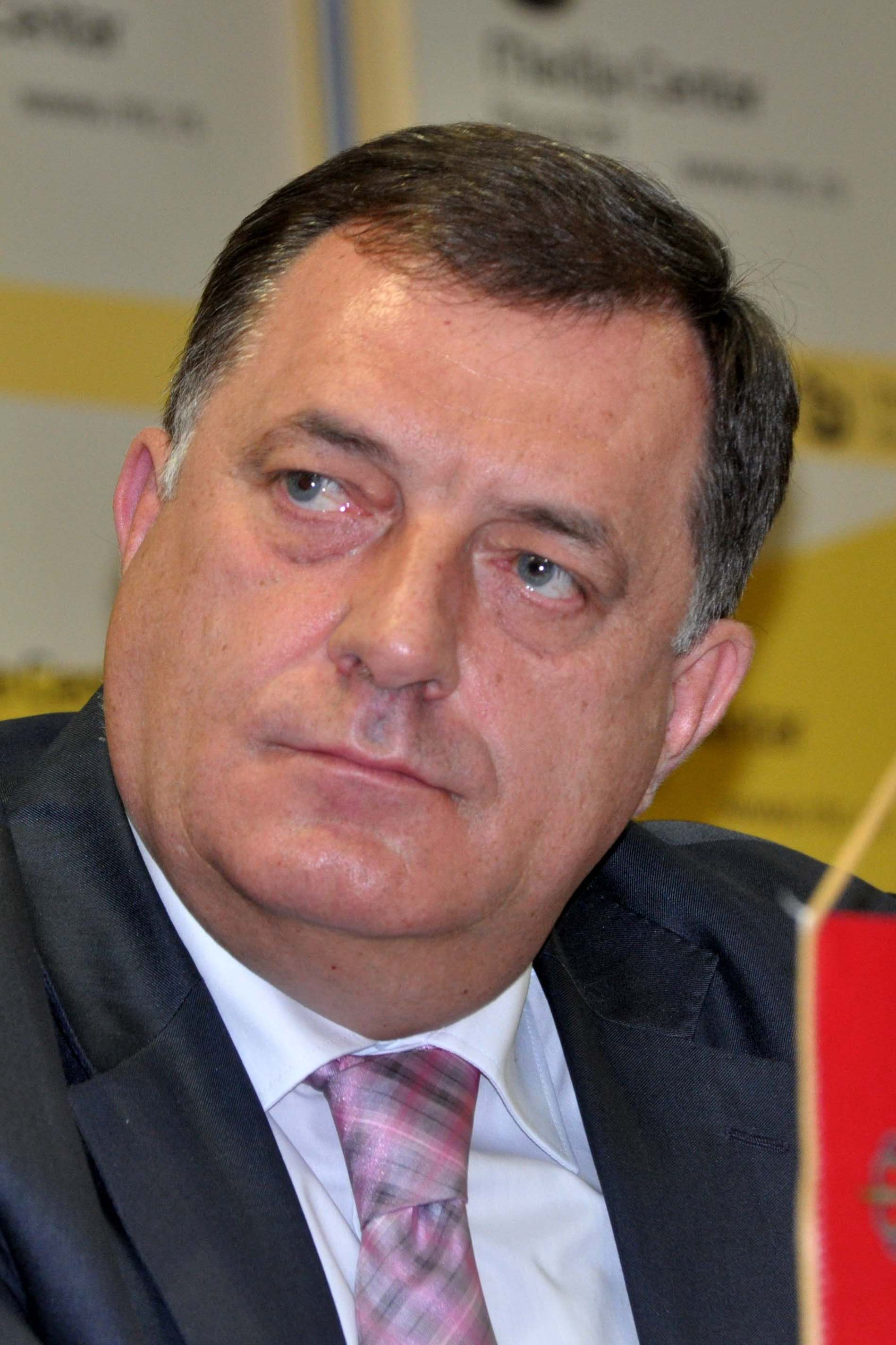

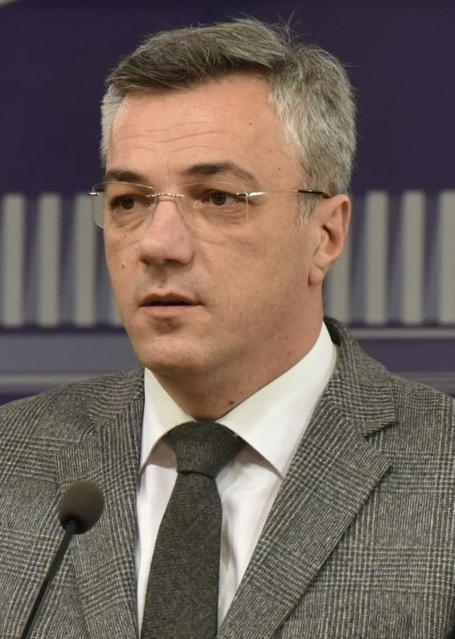
Candidate	Milorad Dodik	Ognjen Tadić
Party	SNSD	SDS
Popular vote	303,496	296,021
Percentage	45.40%	44.28%
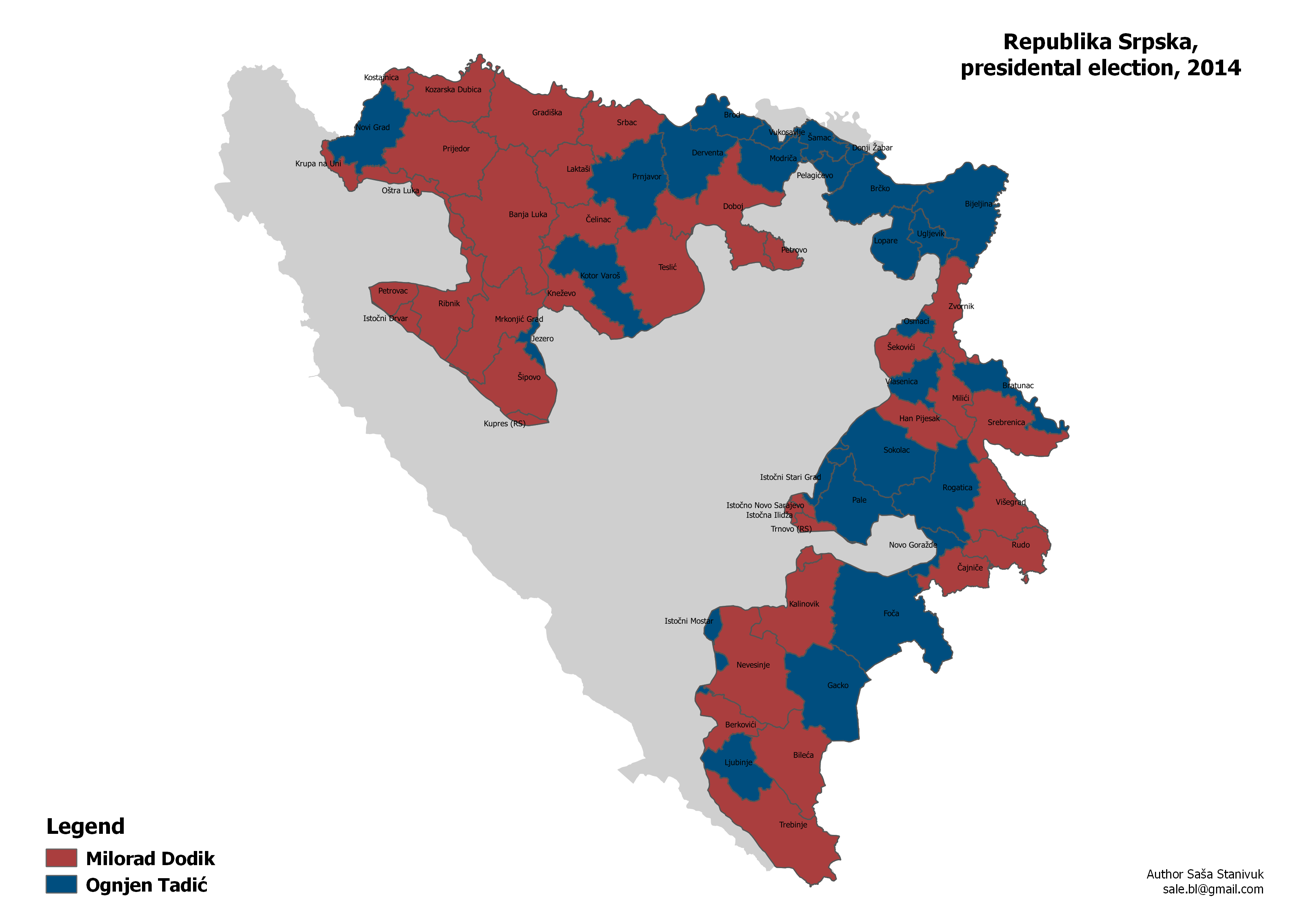
- Results by municipality.
President before election
Milorad Dodik
SNSD
Elected President
Milorad Dodik
SNSD
- National Assembly election
Party	Leader	Vote %	Seats	+/–
SNSD	Milorad Dodik	32.28	29	−8
SDS–PUP–SRS RS	Mladen Bosić	26.26	24	+4
DNS–NS–SRS VS	Marko Pavić	9.22	8	+2
PDP	Mladen Ivanić	7.38	7	0
Homeland	Adil Osmanović	5.22	5	+3
NDP	Dragan Čavić	5.13	5	0
SP	Petar Đokić	5.09	5	+2
This lists parties that won seats. See the complete results below.
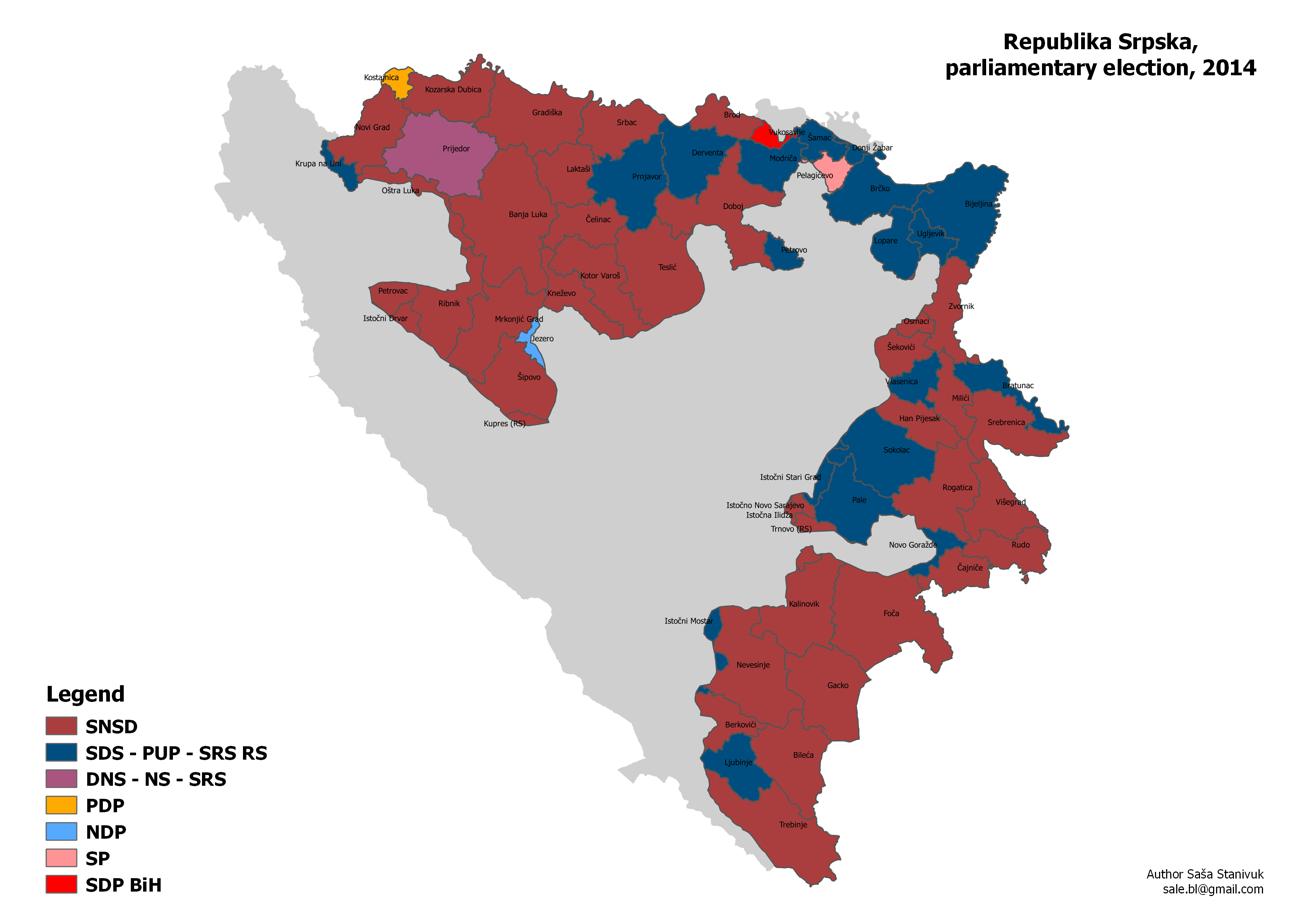
Colours denote the party with the most votes by municipalities.
Prime Minister before	Prime Minister after
Aleksandar Džombić; SNSD	Željka Cvijanović; SNSD

General elections were held in the Republika Srpska entity of Bosnia and Herzegovina on 12 October 2014 as part of the Bosnian general elections. Incumbent President Milorad Dodik was re-elected, running on a joint Alliance of Independent Social Democrats–Democratic People's Alliance–Socialist Party platform, whilst his Alliance of Independent Social Democrats remained the largest in the National Assembly.

== Results ==
=== President ===
Candidate	Party	Votes	%
Milorad Dodik	SNSD–DNS–SP	303,496	45.40
Ognjen Tadić	Alliance for Change (SDS–PDP–SRS RS–PUP)	296,021	44.28
Ramiz Salkić	Homeland	24,294	3.63
Sejfudin Tokić	Party of Democratic Activity	11,312	1.69
Dragomir Jovičić	Fair Policy Party	7,569	1.13
Enes Suljkanović	Social Democratic Party	6,809	1.02
Josip Jerković	HDZ–HSS–HKDU–HSP HB	6,562	0.98
Emil Vlajki	Party of Economic and Social Justice	3,202	0.48
Amir Horić	Bosnian-Herzegovinian Patriotic Party	2,216	0.33
Sanda Stojaković	Communist Party	959	0.14
Vladan Marković	Independent	948	0.14
Milko Stojanović	Independent	873	0.13
Ivo Blažanović	Democratic Party of the Disabled	812	0.12
Mladen Nešković	Independent	783	0.12
Senad Bešić	Independent	754	0.11
Samir Palić	Social Democratic Union	605	0.09
Toma Sedlo	Party of Justice and Trust	582	0.09
Indira Muharemović	First Party	565	0.08
Petrit Čenaj	Independent	166	0.02
Total		668,528	100.00
Valid votes		668,528	94.47
Invalid/blank votes		39,163	5.53
Total votes		707,691	100.00
Source: CEC

=== National Assembly ===
Party	Votes	%	Seats			
Party	Votes	%	Direct	Compensatory	Total	+/–
Alliance of Independent Social Democrats	213,665	32.28	24	5	29	–8
SDS–PUP–SRS RS	173,824	26.26	20	4	24	+4
DNS–NS–SRS VS	61,016	9.22	6	2	8	+2
Party of Democratic Progress	48,845	7.38	6	1	7	0
Homeland	34,583	5.22	3	2	5	+3
National Democratic Movement	33,977	5.13	3	2	5	0
Socialist Party	33,695	5.09	1	4	5	+2
Serb Progressive Party	13,942	2.11	0	0	0	0
Social Democratic Party	12,471	1.88	0	0	0	–3
For Justice and Order	8,874	1.34	0	0	0	New
Fair Policy Party	8,588	1.30	0	0	0	New
Fighters for a New Politics	3,385	0.51	0	0	0	New
Croatian Democratic Union 1990	3,698	0.56	0	0	0	0
Peasant Party	2,021	0.31	0	0	0	New
HDZ–HSS–HKDU–HSP HB	1,810	0.27	0	0	0	0
Power of the People	1,768	0.27	0	0	0	New
Bosnian-Herzegovinian Patriotic Party	1,141	0.17	0	0	0	0
Together for Change (SPP–SDU–DNZ–LDS)	1,060	0.16	0	0	0	–
Communist Party	936	0.14	0	0	0	New
Party of Economic and Social Justice	484	0.07	0	0	0	New
United People's Party	475	0.07	0	0	0	–
Democratic Party of the Disabled	172	0.03	0	0	0	0
First Party	154	0.02	0	0	0	New
Bosnian Party	150	0.02	0	0	0	0
Social Democratic Union – Union for Us All	121	0.02	0	0	0	0
Independents	1,055	0.16	0	0	0	0
Total	661,910	100.00	63	20	83	0
Valid votes	661,910	93.66				
Invalid/blank votes	44,801	6.34				
Total votes	706,711	100.00				
Source: CEC

== See also ==
- 2014 Bosnian general election
- 2014 Federation of Bosnia and Herzegovina general election
