= 2007 Republika Srpska presidential election =

Subnational election in Bosnia and Herzegovina

- 9 December 2007
- Turnout: 37.11%
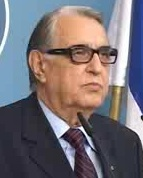

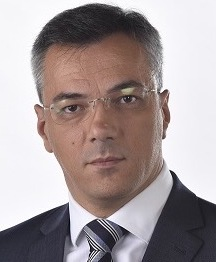

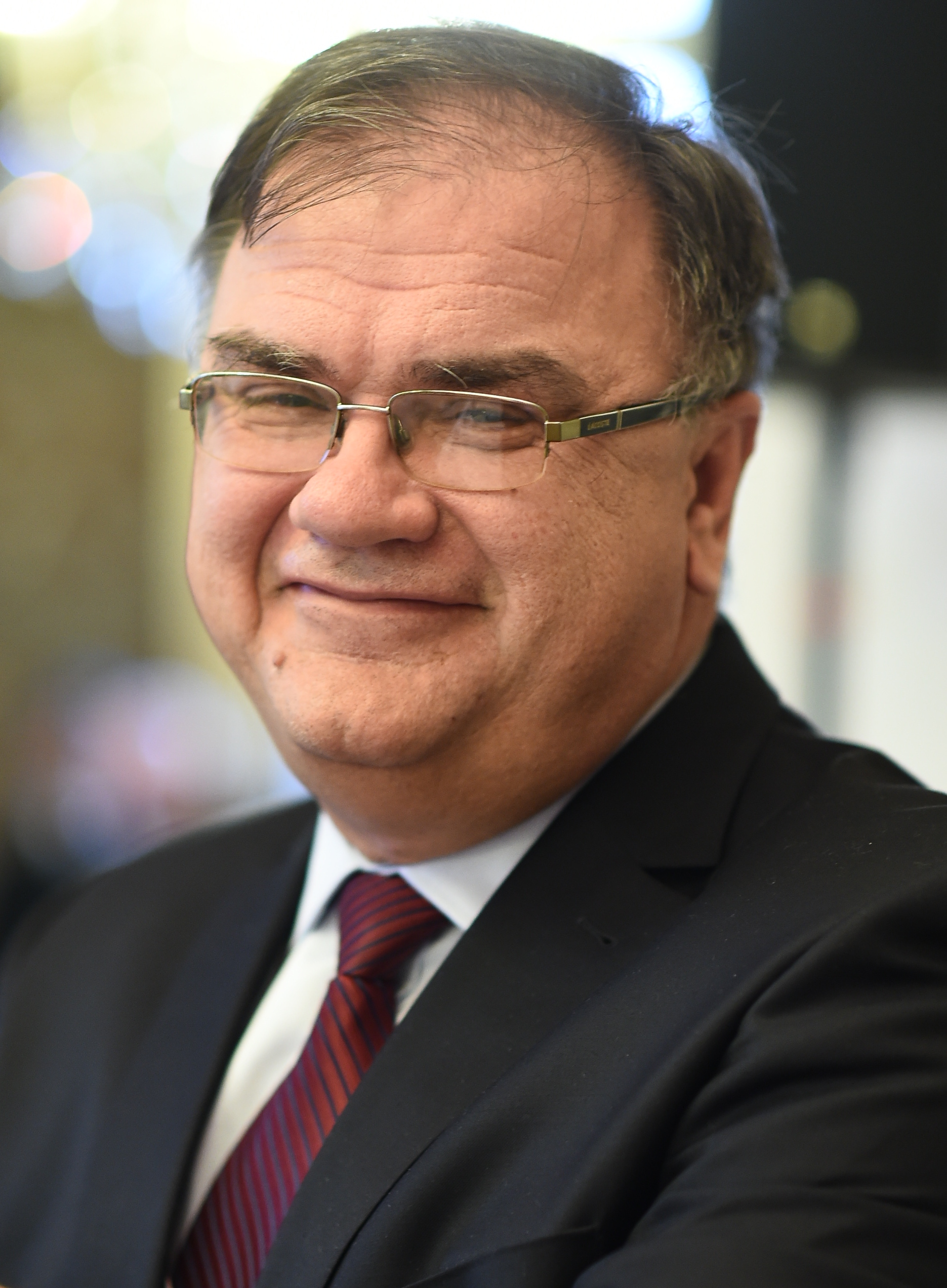
Candidate	Rajko Kuzmanović	Ognjen Tadić	Mladen Ivanić
Party	SNSD	SDS	PDP
Popular vote	169,863	142,898	69,522
Percentage	41.33%	34.77%	16.91%
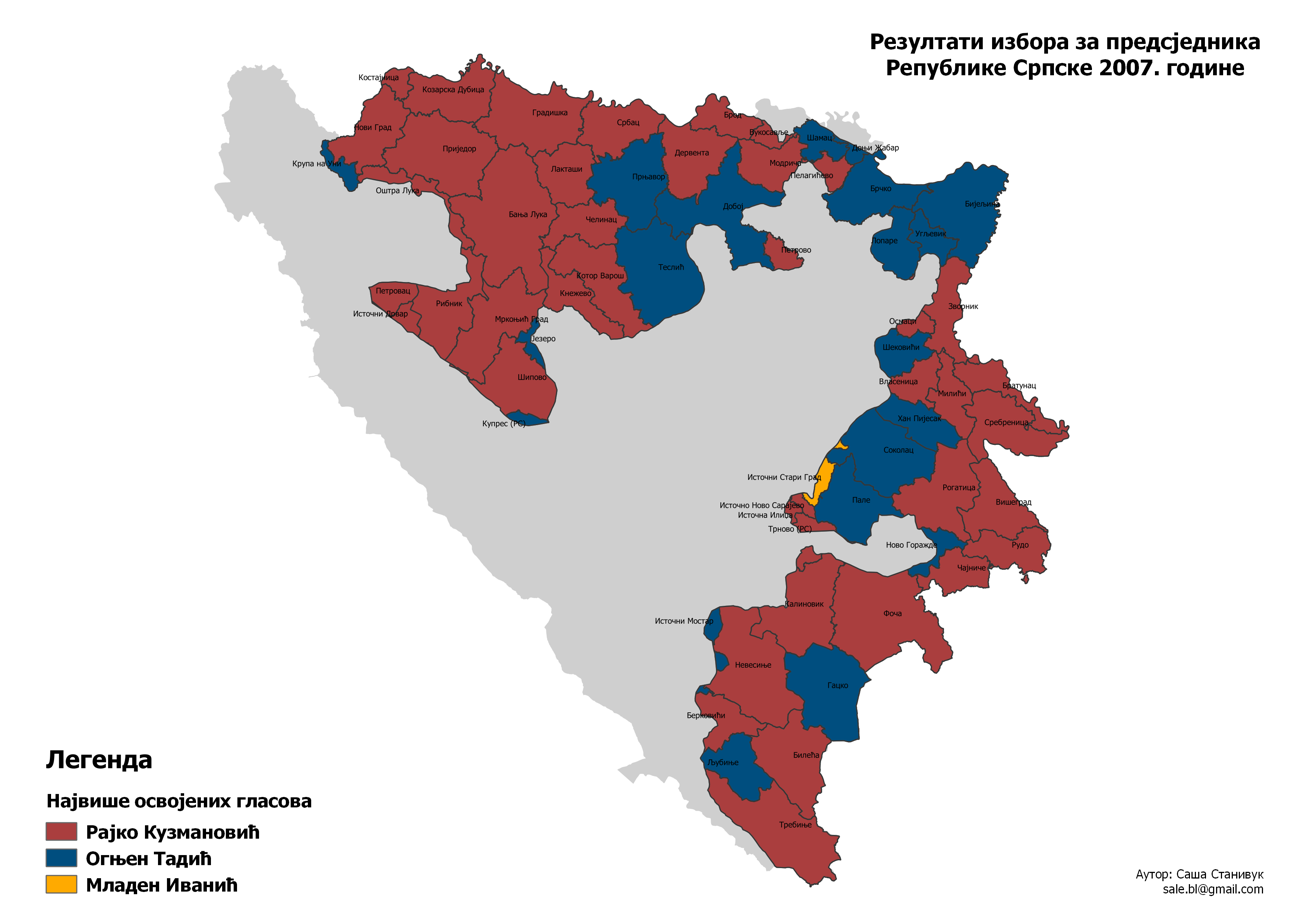
- Colours denote the candidate with the most votes by municipalities.
President before election
Igor Radojičić
(Acting)
SNSD
Elected President
Rajko Kuzmanović
SNSD

Early presidential elections were held in Republika Srpska, an entity of Bosnia and Herzegovina, on 9 December 2007 after the premature death of President Milan Jelić on 30 September 2007. Until the election took place, Igor Radojičić, also from the ruling Alliance of Independent Social Democrats, was acting president. The election had to be called within fifteen days of Jelić's death; it was called on 11 October 2007, with candidates to be nominated by 16 October 2007.

== Candidates ==
There were ten candidates, with the frontrunners being the Republika Srpska Academy of Sciences chairman Rajko Kuzmanović of the ruling Alliance of Independent Social Democrats, MP Ognjen Tadić of the main opposition Serb Democratic Party, and former Prime Minister of Republika Srpska and Bosnia and Herzegovina Foreign Minister Mladen Ivanić of the Party of Democratic Progress.

All three main candidates supported Republika Srpska's status in Bosnia and Herzegovina and the Dayton Accords. President of Serbia Boris Tadić and the Democratic Party in Serbia supported the SNSD and its candidate Kuzmanović. According to the electoral law, there would be no run-off.

The other candidates were:

- Mirko Blagojević of the Serbian Radical Party "Dr. Vojislav Šešelj"
- Slobodan Popović of the Social Democratic Party
- Krsto Jandrić of the National Democratic Party
- Anton Josipović of the People's Party Work for Prosperity
- Nedžad Delić of the Democratic Party of the Disabled
- Dragan Đokanović independent candidate
- Nikola Lazarević of the European Ecological Party E5

== Results ==
According to unofficial results (with 55% of the votes counted), Kuzmanović won the election with 44.53% of the votes to Tadić's 33.28% and Ivanić's 16%. Turnout was close to 36%.

Official results released on 2007-12-17 confirmed these preliminary results. Kuzmanović was sworn in on 2007-12-28.

Candidate	Party	Votes	%
Rajko Kuzmanović	Alliance of Independent Social Democrats	169,863	41.33
Ognjen Tadić	Serb Democratic Party	142,898	34.77
Mladen Ivanić	Party of Democratic Progress	69,522	16.91
Slobodan Popović	Social Democratic Party	8,659	2.11
Mirko Blagojević	Serbian Radical Party "Dr. Vojislav Šešelj"	7,526	1.83
Nedžad Delić	Democratic Party of the Disabled	4,499	1.09
Krsto Jandrić	National Democratic Party	3,945	0.96
Anton Josipović	People's Party Work for Prosperity	2,529	0.62
Dragan Đokanović	Independent	849	0.21
Nikola Lazarević	European Ecological Party E5	733	0.18
Total		411,023	100.00
Valid votes		411,023	98.68
Invalid/blank votes		5,491	1.32
Total votes		416,514	100.00
Registered voters/turnout		1,122,491	37.11
Source: CEC
