= National Democratic Party =

National Democratic Party may refer to:

== A–L ==
- National Democratic Party (Argentina), 1931–1955
- National Democratic Party (Austria, 1967–88)
- National Democratic Party (Bangladesh)
- National Democratic Party (Barbados)
- National Democratic Party (Bosnia and Herzegovina)
- National Democratic Party (British Guiana), led by Rudy Kendall
- National Democratic Party (British Virgin Islands)
- National Democratic Party (Bulgaria)
- National Democratic Party (Cayman Islands)
- National Democratic Party (Chile)
- National Democratic Party (Czechoslovakia)
- National Democratic Party (Djibouti)
- National Democratic Party (Egypt), founded by President Anwar El Sadat in 1978 - dissolved in 2011
- National Democratic Party (El Salvador)
- National Democratic Party (Finland)
- National Democratic Party (Fiji, 1960s)
- National Democratic Party (Fiji, 2006)
- National Democratic Party (Georgia)
- National Democratic Party of Germany (East Germany)
- National Democratic Party of Germany
- National Democratic Party (Ghana)
- National Democratic Party (Gold Coast), active from 1950 to 1952
- National Democratic Party (Greece), in the 1920s led by Georgios Kondylis
- National Democratic Party (Hungary)
- National Democratic Party (India)
- NasDem Party, Indonesia
- National Democratic Party (Kerala), in Kerala, India from 1974 to 1996
- National Democratic Party (Iraq, 1946)
- National Democratic Party (Iraq)
- National Democratic Party (Ireland)
- National Democratic Party (Japan, 1929), led by Miyazaki Ryusuke
- National Democratic Party (Japan), from 1950 until 1952
- National Democratic Party of Liberia
- National Democratic Party of Lithuania

== M–Z ==
- National Democratic Party (Morocco)
- National Democratic Party (Namibia)
- National Democratic Party (Nepal)
- National Democratic Party (Nigeria)
- National Democratic Party (North Macedonia)
- National Democratic Party (Northern Ireland)
- National Democratic Party (Pakistan)
- National Democratic Party (Philippines)
- National-Democratic Party (Poland)
- National Democratic Party (Rhodesia), predecessor of the Zimbabwe African People's Union
- National Democratic Party (Romania)
- National Democratic Party (Sint Maarten)
- National-Democratic Party (Slovakia), predecessor of the Democratic Union
- National Democratic Party (Slovenia)
- National Democratic Party of Spain
- National Democratic Party (Suriname)
- National Democratic Party of Tibet, the primary political party of the Tibetan government in exile
- National Democratic and Labour Party, a British party often known as the National Democratic Party
- National Democratic Party (UK, 1966)
- National Democratic Party (United States), historic political party, not to be confused with the modern United States Democratic Party
- National Democratic Party of Alabama, in U.S., opposed George Wallace
- National Democratic Party (Venezuela)

== See also ==
- Democratic National Party (disambiguation)
- National Democrats (disambiguation)
- National Party (disambiguation)
- NDP (disambiguation)
- National Democracy (disambiguation)
- National Democratic Movement (disambiguation)
- Nationalist Democracy Party, a former political party in Turkey
- Rashtriya Loktantrik Party, India
- National Loktantrik Party, India
