= Milan Jelić =

Bosnian Serb politician (1956–2007)

- Милан Јелић
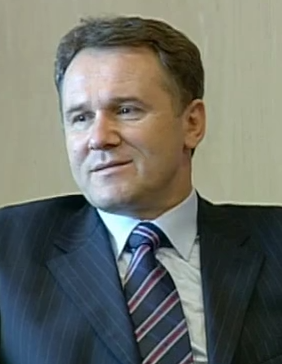
- Jelić in 2007

President of Republika Srpska
- In office 9 November 2006 – 30 September 2007
- Vice President: Adil Osmanović; Davor Čordaš
- Preceded by: Dragan Čavić
- Succeeded by: Rajko Kuzmanović
Additional positions
Member of the Presidency of the Football Association of Bosnia and Herzegovina
In office May 2002 – 30 September 2007
Preceded by	Jusuf Pušina; Jerko Doko
Succeeded by	Bogdan Čeko
President of the Football Association of Republika Srpska
In office 1998 – 30 September 2007
Preceded by	Branko Lazarević
Succeeded by	Mile Kovačević

Personal details
- Born: 26 March 1956 Modriča, SR Bosnia and Herzegovina, SFR Yugoslavia
- Died: 30 September 2007 (aged 51) Doboj, Bosnia and Herzegovina
- Party: Alliance of Independent Social Democrats

Milan Jelić (Serbian Cyrillic: Милан Јелић; 26 March 1956 – 30 September 2007) was a Bosnian Serb politician who served as president of Republika Srpska from 2006 until his death in 2007.

== Education ==
Born near Modriča on 26 March 1956, Jelić completed his secondary education in Doboj and graduated from the University of Novi Sad Faculty of Economics at Subotica, Serbia. He gained a doctorate from the University of Banja Luka.

== Career ==
Jelić spent four years on the local council in Modriča, and at the beginning of 1987 he was appointed manager of OOUR in the town. There he spent seven years, until he was appointed general manager of Modriča. After the Dayton Agreement was signed he was elected to the National Assembly of Republika Srpska. He also served as president of the Football Association of Republika Srpska, and was member of the Presidency of the Football Association of Bosnia and Herzegovina.

== Personal life ==
Jelić has two sons, Petar and Dimitrije. Petar is a professional footballer.

=== Death ===
On the afternoon of 30 September 2007, during his usual training session in Modriča, Jelić experienced heart failure, and died shortly afterwards, after an unsuccessful resuscitation attempt in a Doboj hospital.

Political offices
Preceded by Dragan Čavić	President of Republika Srpska; 2006–2007	Succeeded by Igor Radojičić (acting)
