= Anton Kasipović =

Bosnian Croat politician, lawyer and journalist (born 1956)

- Антон Касиповић
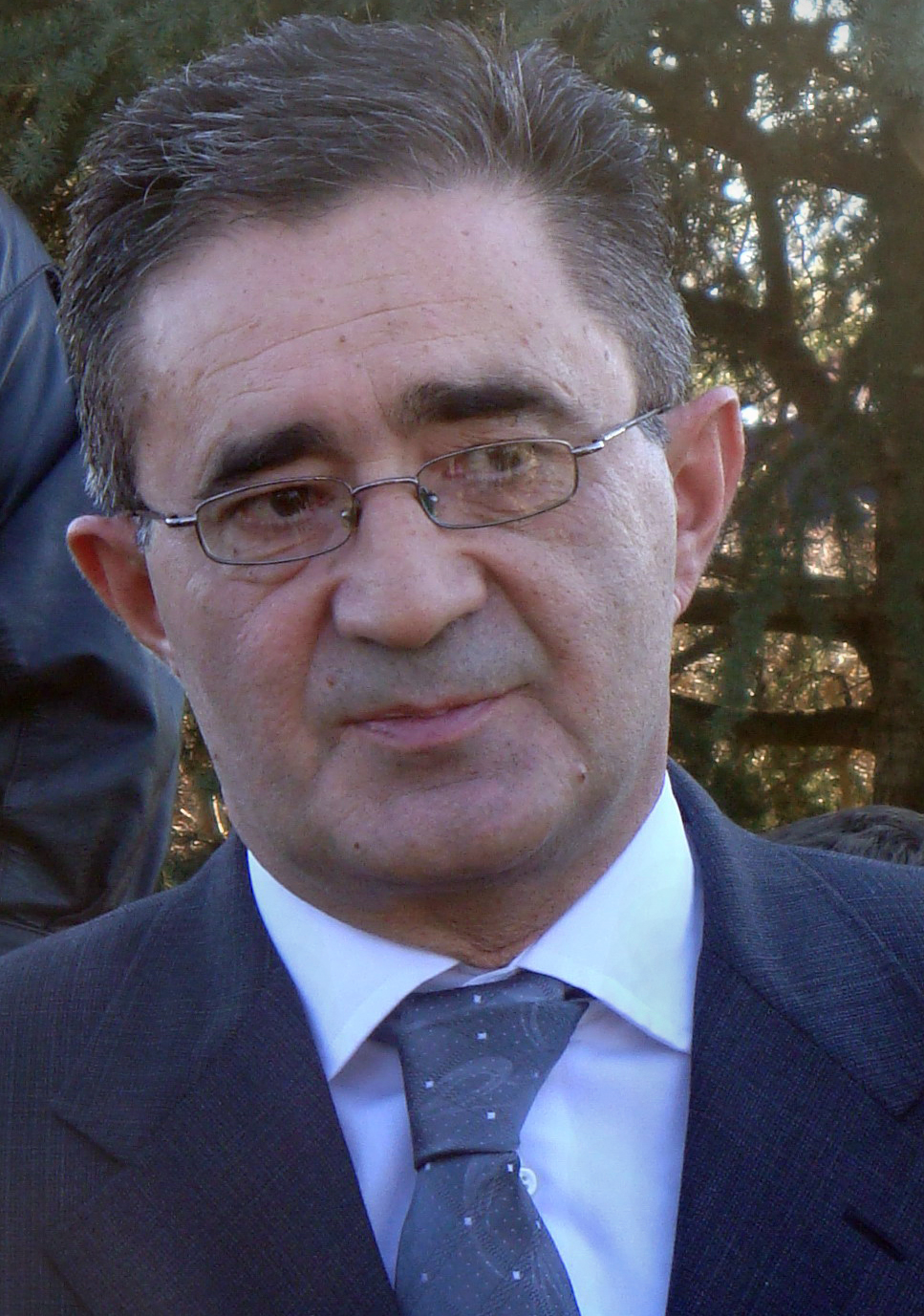
- Kasipović in 2011

Prime Minister of Republika Srpska
- Acting
- In office 15 November 2010 – 29 December 2010
- President: Milorad Dodik
- Preceded by: Milorad Dodik
- Succeeded by: Aleksandar Džombić

Personal details
- Born: 30 August 1956 (age 70) Banja Luka, SR Bosnia and Herzegovina, SFR Yugoslavia
- Party: Independent
- Spouse: Biljana
- Children: 1
- Education: University of Banja Luka

Anton Kasipović (Serbian Cyrillic: Антон Касиповић; born 30 August 1956) is a Bosnian Croat politician, lawyer and journalist who served as acting Prime Minister of Republika Srpska from November to December 2010. He served as Minister of Justice of Republika Srpska. He previously served as Minister of Education and Culture.

== Biography ==
Kasipović completed primary and secondary school in Banja Luka and graduated from the Faculty of Law in Banja Luka. He was a journalist for the daily newspaper Glas Srpske, where he worked as director and editor-in-chief. He also worked as a correspondent for Television Sarajevo. He came to the post of Minister from the position of marketing director of the Public Radio and TV Service Service of BiH. He is married and has one child.

Kasipović was elected to the position of Minister of Education and Culture of Republika Srpska in three governments, the second and third governments of Milorad Dodik, and the government of Aleksandar Džombić, who resigned on 27 February 2013, and served until 12 March 2013.

After the election of the President of Republika Srpska in 2010, and the election of the then Prime Minister of Republika Srpska Milorad Dodik to the post of President, Kasipović was acting Prime Minister for a short period.
