= Democratic National Party =

Democratic National Party may refer to:

- Democratic National Party (Cyprus)
- Democratic National Party (Peru)

== See also ==
- Democratic Nationalist Party (disambiguation)
- National Democratic Party (disambiguation)
- National Democrats (disambiguation)
- National Party (disambiguation)
