= National Democratic Movement =

National Democratic Movement may refer to:

- National Democratic Movement (Bosnia and Herzegovina)
- National Democratic Movement (Guatemala)
- National Democratic Movement (Jamaica)
- National Democratic Movement (Pakistan)
- The National Democratic Movement (South Sudan)

== See also ==
- National Democratic Party (disambiguation)
- National Democrats (disambiguation)
- National Democracy (disambiguation)
