= National Democracy =

National Democracy may refer to:

- National democracy (Marxism–Leninism)
  - National liberation struggle, the struggle of the colonised to establish an independent state
  - National democratic revolution, the revolutionary seizure of power in newly-independent states
  - National democratic state, a state taken over by revolutionary elements to safeguard their states independence
- National Democracy (Czech Republic)
- National Democracy (Italy)
- National Democracy (Philippines)
- National Democracy (Poland)
- National Democracy (Spain)
- National Democracy (Ukraine)

== See also ==
- Civic nationalism, a general concept
- National Democratic Movement (disambiguation)
- National Democratic Party (disambiguation)
- National Democrats (disambiguation)
- Nationalist Democracy Party, Turkey
- Party for National Democracy, Myanmar
