= Ognjen Tadić =

Bosnian Serb politician (born 1974)

- Огњен Тадић
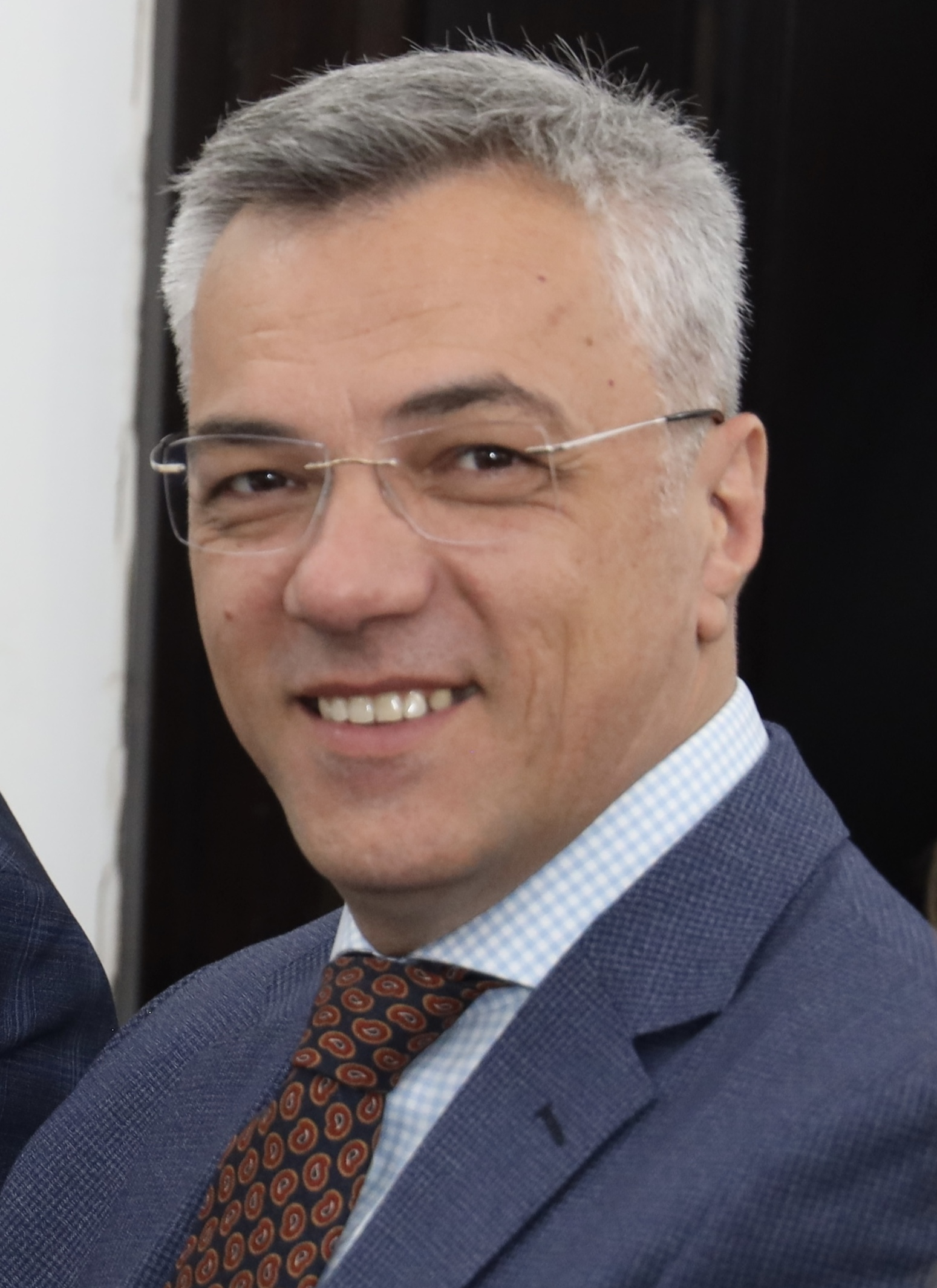
- Tadić in 2025

Member of the House of Peoples
- In office 9 June 2011 – 28 February 2019

Member of the National Assembly of Republika Srpska
- In office 9 November 2006 – 15 November 2010

Personal details
- Born: 20 April 1974 (age 52) Sarajevo, SR Bosnia and Herzegovina, SFR Yugoslavia
- Party: Democratic People's Alliance (2018–2020)
- Other political affiliations: Serb Democratic Party (2006–2017)
- Spouse: Daliborka Tadić
- Children: 3
- Education: University of Banja Luka (LLB, MA)

Ognjen Tadić (Serbian Cyrillic: Огњен Тадић; born 20 April 1974) is a Bosnian Serb politician, lawyer, journalist and sociologist who served as member of the national House of Peoples from 2011 to 2019. Previously, he served as member of the National Assembly of Republika Srpska from 2006 to 2010.

Tadić studied at the University of Banja Luka, where he earned degrees from the Faculty of Law and from the Faculty of Political Science. He is a lawyer, journalist and sociologist.

Tadić was a prominent figure of the Serb Democratic Party, until he left it in 2017 to join the Democratic People's Alliance a year later. He left the Democratic People's Alliance in 2020.

== Personal life and education ==
Tadić was born in Sarajevo, SFR Yugoslavia, present-day Bosnia and Herzegovina in 1974. He holds a degree in law and political science from the University of Banja Luka.

He is married to Daliborka Tadić and together they have three children.

== Political career ==
Tadić was the Head of the Office (1998–99), Social Affairs Advisor (1999–2000) and Political Affairs Advisor (2005–06) of the president of Republika Srpska.

From 9 November 2006 to 15 November 2010, he was a member of the National Assembly of Republika Srpska. From 9 June 2011 until 28 February 2019, Tadić was a member of the national House of Peoples as well.

At the 2007 Republika Srpska presidential election, he won 34.77% of the vote as a candidate of the Serb Democratic Party. At the 2010 Republika Srpska general election, Tadić won 35.92% of votes as a candidate for president of the Together for Srpska coalition. At the 2014 general election, he won 44.28% of votes as a candidate for president of the Alliance for Change coalition.

Tadić was a member of the Parliamentary Assembly of the Mediterranean from 2011 to 2019. He was also an observer in the Assembly of the Western European Union from 2008 until 2010.
