= Party of United Pensioners =

The Party of United Pensioners (Serbian: Партија уједињених пензионера, Partija ujedinjenih penzionera, PUP) is a centrist political party representing the interests of pensioners in Republika Srpska.

== History ==
The PUP contested the 2010 elections in Republika Srpska in an alliance with the Socialist Party, winning four seats.

The 2014 elections saw the party join an alliance with the Serb Democratic Party and the Serbian Radical Party. The alliance emerged as the second largest faction in the National Assembly, winning 24 of the 83 seats.
