= Homeland (political alliance) =

Bosnian political alliance

Homeland Domovina
- Leader: Collective leadership
- Ideology: Unitarism; Conservatism; Pro-Europeanism Internal factions: Bosniak nationalism; Croatian nationalism
- Political position: Big tent

Homeland (Bosnian: Domovina) was an electoral alliance in Republika Srpska, one of two entities of Bosnia and Herzegovina, forming a joint parliamentary group in the National Assembly.

The alliance consisted of the Party of Democratic Action, the Union for a Better Future, the Croatian Party of Rights, the Democratic Front, the Party for Bosnia and Herzegovina, the Diaspora Party of Bosnia and Herzegovina and the Posavina Party.

== History ==
Consisting of the Party of Democratic Action, the Union for a Better Future, the Croatian Party of Rights, the Democratic Front, the Party for Bosnia and Herzegovina, the Diaspora Party of Bosnia and Herzegovina and the Posavina Party, the alliance was formed to contest the 2014 general election in Republika Srpska.

In the general election, the alliance received 5.22% of the vote, winning five seats in the National Assembly.

== Member parties ==
Name	Abbr.	Position	Ideology
Party of Democratic Action; Stranka demokratske akcije	SDA	Centre-right to right-wing	Bosniak nationalism Conservatism; Pro-Europeanism
Union for a Better Future; Savez za bolju budućnost	SBB	Centre-right	Conservatism; Secularism; Pro-Europeanism
Croatian Party of Rights; Hrvatska stranka prava	HSP BiH	Far-right	Croatian nationalism Neo-fascism
Democratic Front; Demokratska fronta	DF	Centre to centre-left	Unitarism; Civic nationalism Pro-Europeanism
Party for Bosnia and Herzegovina; Stranka za Bosnu i Hercegovinu	SBiH	Centre	Social conservatism Bosnian unitarism Pro-Europeanism

== Election results ==
=== National Assembly of Republika Srpska ===
Election	Vote	%	Seats	+/–	Status
2014	34,583	5.22	5 / 83	New	Opposition

=== President of Republika Srpska ===
Election	Place	Candidate	Votes	%	Result
2014	3rd	Ramiz Salkić	24,294	3.63%	Lost
