= Democratic Nationalist Party =

Democratic Nationalist Party may refer to:

- Democratic Nationalist Party (Malta, 1921–26), a conservative political party in Malta
- Democratic Nationalist Party (Malta, 1959–66), a political party in Malta between 1959 and 1966
- Democratic Nationalist Party (Romania), a political party in Romania
- Democratic Nationalist Party (South Korea), a conservative political party in South Korea
