= National Democrats =

- National Democrats (Germany)
- National Democrats (Northern Ireland) (1965–1970)
- National Democrats (Norway, 1991)
- National Democrats (Norway) (2006–2007)
- National Democrats (Poland) (1886–1947)
- National Democrats (Sweden) (2001–2014)
- National Democrats (United Kingdom) (1995–2011)

== See also ==
- National Democratic Movement (disambiguation)
- National Democratic Party (disambiguation)
- Democratic National Party (disambiguation)
- National Democracy (disambiguation)
