= National Defence Party =

National Defence Party may refer to:

- National Defence Party (Iceland) 1902–1912
- National Defence Party (Palestine)
- Rashtriya Raksha Dal, a political party in India
