= Rajko Kuzmanović =

President of Republika Srpska from 2007 to 2010

- Рајко Кузмановић
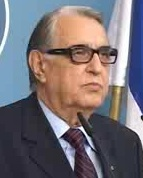
- Kuzmanović in 2010

President of Republika Srpska
- In office 9 December 2007 – 15 November 2010
- Vice President: Adil Osmanović; Davor Čordaš
- Preceded by: Igor Radojičić (acting)
- Succeeded by: Milorad Dodik

Personal details
- Born: 1 December 1931 (age 94) Čelinac, Kingdom of Yugoslavia
- Party: Alliance of Independent Social Democrats
- Education: University of Zagreb (BA, MA); University of Mostar (PhD)

Rajko Kuzmanović (Serbian Cyrillic: Рајко Кузмановић; born 1 December 1931) is a Bosnian Serb retired politician who served as the President of Republika Srpska from 2007 to 2010. He is a member of the Alliance of Independent Social Democrats.

== Education ==
Kuzmanović graduated from Teaching school in Banja Luka in 1954, before studying law in Zagreb. In 1973, he graduated from the Faculty of Philosophy in Zagreb, receiving the title of Professor of Pedagogy and Sociology. In 1977, he received a PhD from the Faculty of Law in Mostar. He joined the University of Banja Luka's law school in 1975, working as a lecturer and professor. He was Dean of the Faculty of Law from 1983 to 1985 and then from 1996 until 2000, and two years as the Dean of the Faculty of Business Economics. He served as vice-chancellor from 1986 to 1988 and chancellor from 1988 to 1992.

== Career ==
After working as a judge, Kuzmanović became president of the Constitutional Court of Law of Republika Srpska in 1998. In 2002, he became a member of the High Judicial Council and the High Prosecutor's Council.

Kuzmanović won the 2007 Republika Srpska presidential election against Ognjen Tadić of the Serb Democratic Party with nearly 42% of the vote. He succeeded the Acting President Igor Radojičić.
