= Momčilo Mandić =

Bosnian Serb political and business figure

Momčilo Mandić (Serbian Cyrillic: Момчило Мандић; born 1 May 1954) is a Bosnian Serb political and business figure. He was justice minister in the government of the breakaway Republika Srpska during the Bosnian War before being reassigned to Belgrade as head of the Bosnian Serb territory's government bureau in Serbia. He was later acquitted of war crimes charges by a Bosnian court but convicted of financial offices in a separate trial and issued a five-year prison sentence.

In the 2016 Serbian parliamentary election, Mandić was elected to the National Assembly of Serbia on the electoral list of the far-right Serbian Radical Party.

== Early life and career ==
Mandić was born in Kalinovik, in what was then the People's Republic of Bosnia and Herzegovina in the Federal People's Republic of Yugoslavia. He received a Bachelor of Laws degree and trained as a lawyer, worked in the narcotics division of the Sarajevo police department, and later became a judge in the Sarajevo Municipal Court. He was Bosnia and Herzegovina's deputy interior minister from 1991 to 1992, working under minister Alija Delimustafić.

== The Bosnian War (1992–95) and its aftermath ==
Mandić relocated to Pale at the outbreak of the Bosnian War. He was appointed as assistant to Republika Srpska internal affairs minister Mićo Stanišić on April 1, 1992, and served in this role for twenty days before being appointed as justice minister. In December of the same year, he was reassigned by the governing Serb Democratic Party as head of the Republika Srpska's government bureau (i.e., a de facto embassy) in Belgrade. In 1994, Mandić indicated that the bureau, in addition to representing the interests of the Bosnian Serb government, was responsible for the care of Bosnian Serb refugees living in Serbia. Jovo Đogo, a colonel in the Bosnian Serb Army, later said that it was also responsible for ensuring Bosnian Serb military conscripts in Serbia returned to the battlefield.

Mandić rose to the upper echelons of the Bosnian Serb leadership during the Bosnian War, establishing high-level political contacts in both Bosnia and Serbia and playing an important role in the informal economy of the region. Following the end of the Bosnian War, he set up the bank Privredna Banka Sarajevo and the company ManCo, both of which were frequently accused of questionable financial practices.

Mandić was appointed as the Republika Srpska's deputy interior minister in September 1997, reportedly at the instigation of Momčilo Krajišnik and his allies. In October 1997, Mandić announced that terrorists based in Tuzla were threatening to attack the city of Brčko in a bid to undermine both the Bosnian Serb entity and the Serb Democratic Party; he added that his police forces would not permit this to happen. Later in the same month, he took part in negotiations between his ministry and a members of a dissident police organization in Trebinje. He stood down from office not long after this time, presumably after Milorad Dodik, a political rival, became prime minister in January 1998.

Mandić was identified as one of the wealthiest individuals in the Republika Srpska in a 2002 news article. He was a prominent financial supporter of the Serb Democratic Party during this time (having by his own acknowledgement donated about half a million dollars to the party prior to each recent election) and also provided financial support to the Democratic Party of Serbia in a bid to remove Serbian prime minister Zoran Đinđic from office.

== Relations with Radovan Karadžić and 2003 arrest ==
In January 2003, various international authorities accused Mandić of bankrolling former Republika Srpska president Radovan Karadžić's private security at a time when the former Bosnian Serb leader was a fugitive wanted on war crimes charges by the International Criminal Tribunal for the Former Yugoslavia in The Hague. Mandić denied the accusation, saying, "I wish Radovan Karadžić health and happiness and I hope he will never be caught, but as far as financial assistance is concerned, these allegations are simply not true." This notwithstanding, Mandić's financial assets were subsequently frozen by various international agencies, and the United States Department of State described him as "a major funding source for Radovan Karadžić through [his] control of an elaborate network of criminal enterprises engaged in embezzlement, business fraud, fictitious loans, and various other activities that generate funds to financially support the protection of Karadžić." In July of the same year, Mandić was banned from entering the European Union.

Mandić was arrested by Serbian officials in April 2003 on suspicion of having committed a number of criminal acts; this occurred in the aftermath of Zoran Đinđic's assassination and in the context of a large-scale crackdown on organized crime. In July 2003, the Second Municipal Court in Belgrade announced that Mandić was being investigated on suspicion of having overseen up to six million euros' worth of illegal transactions from the Federal Republic of Yugoslavia into Bosnia and Herzegovina between November 2002 and March 2003. He was released in early September, when the Supreme Court of Serbia ruled there were "no grounds for extending the custody." The court's investigation into Mandić's financial activities ended in March 2004 with no charges filed.

Following his release from custody, Mandić said that his relations with Karadžić during the Bosnian War had in fact been quite tense, and that the two were not personal friends. In the same interview, he said that he was no longer a supporter of the Serb Democratic Party and that the net worth of his business holdings had been reduced from several millions to several hundred thousand euros.

In November 2004, High Representative for Bosnia and Herzegovina Paddy Ashdown liquidated the Privredna Banka Srpsko Sarajevo, of which Mandić was managing director. Ashdown charged that Mandić and his associates had diverted public funds to themselves and that some of the funds may have ended up in the hands of war criminals.

Mandić testified at the International Criminal Tribunal trial of Momčilo Krajišnik in late 2004. He was subsequently asked, upon his return to Serbia, if he himself could have been at risk of being indicted by the tribunal. He responded, "Now that this is over, I can inform the public that I was never at risk of becoming one of the Hague indictees. This is because I was the first minister of civilian judiciary and I did not have any competences in the war or for the war. [...] Some Serbian and Bosnian media have exaggerated my role at the beginning of the war. The Bosnian public and the public of the whole former Yugoslavia know that I was in the war for five or six months only, as the minister of civilian judiciary, which is far less important than any other institution at any level in the Serb Republic and the Federation."

Mandić also testified at Karadžić's trial in The Hague in 2010, following the latter's capture and extradition. In the course of his testimony, he described the paramilitary groups that crossed from Serbia into Bosnia in 1992 as "villains" guilty of rape and murder. He said that he and Mićo Stanišić sought to suppress the paramilitaries and described Biljana Plavšić, who openly supported the paramilitary groups, as "not a nationalist but an evil person."

== Conviction on financial changes ==
Mandić was arrested in Budva, Montenegro, on a Bosnian warrant in August 2005, on charges of fraud and embezzlement. In February 2006, he was formally charged with "helping war crimes fugitives, abuse of office, fraud and organised crime." In October of the same year, he was sentenced to nine years in prison (later reduced to five) for embezzlement and abuse of power, and ordered to pay 2.3 million euros in damages to the Privredna Banka Sarajevo. He was, however, acquitted of providing financial support to Karadžić.

== Trial and acquittal on war crimes charges ==
While Mandić was already in detention for financial offences, the Prosecutor's Office of Bosnia and Herzegovina launched an investigation against him for alleged war crimes committed during the Bosnian War. In July 2006, he was charged with having been "exclusively responsible [in his capacity as justice minister] for the functioning of the correctional facilities in the Serb Republic between May and December 1992" when three prisons (two near Sarajevo, the other in Foča) were used as detention camps where non-Serbs were illegally imprisoned and treated harshly. He was also charged with leading an attack by Bosnian Serb forces on the Bosnian interior ministry's training centre in Sarajevo at the start of the war in April 1992.

Mandić was acquitted of all charges in July 2007. Concerning the charge pertaining to the oversight of the prisons, the presiding judge ruled that there was no evidence Mandić was in charge of the institutions or that he directly supervised those responsible for crimes committed there.

== Member of the National Assembly of Serbia ==
Mandić was given the thirteenth position on the far-right Serbian Radical Party's electoral list in the 2016 Serbian parliamentary election and was elected when the party won twenty-two mandates. The election was won by the Serbian Progressive Party and its allies, and Mandić sits as a member of the opposition. He is currently a member of the parliamentary defence and internal affairs committee; a deputy member of three other committees; and a member of the parliamentary friendship groups with Belarus, Greece, Kazakhstan, and Russia.
