= Dragan Čavić =

Bosnian Serb politician (born 1958)

- Драган Чавић
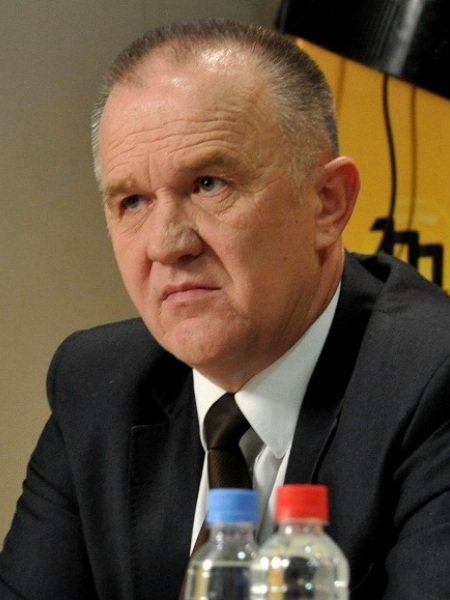
- Čavić in 2013

President of Republika Srpska
- In office 28 November 2002 – 9 November 2006
- Preceded by: Mirko Šarović
- Succeeded by: Milan Jelić

President of the Serb Democratic Party
- In office 20 July 2004 – 15 December 2006
- Preceded by: Dragan Kalinić
- Succeeded by: Mladen Bosić

Personal details
- Born: 10 March 1958 (age 68) Zenica, Yugoslavia
- Party: Serb Democratic Party (until 2009); Democratic Party (2009–2013); NDP (since 2013)
- Education: University of Banja Luka
- Profession: Economist

Dragan Čavić (Serbian Cyrillic: Драган Чавић; born 10 March 1958) is a Bosnian Serb politician who served as President of Republika Srpska from 2002 to 2006. He previously served as Vice President from 2000 to 2002. He was the president of the Serb Democratic Party from 2004 to 2006.

== Education and personal life ==
Čavić attended elementary and high school in Banja Luka, and graduated from the Economics Faculty of the University of Banja Luka in 1980. He worked as an economist, financial manager and commercial director in several public and private companies. Čavić is married and has a son and a daughter.

== Political career ==
Čavić is a former member of the Serb Democratic Party: he served as president of the party until 2006, after having been deputy president of the party presidency from June 1998 to March 2002. At the party elections in 2002 he was elected deputy president of the party.

In 1998, he was elected deputy in the National Assembly of Republika Srpska. He was removed from office by the then High Representative Carlos Westendorp since he was deemed obstructing implementation of the Dayton Peace Agreement, and banned from political activity. The decision was overturned in 1999 by Vestendorp's successor, Wolfgang Petritsch.

Čavić became the president of Republika Srpska on 28 November 2002, after the municipal elections in Bosnia and Herzegovina in October, thus replacing the former president Mirko Šarović. He received 35.9% of votes, while his most successful rival, Milan Jelić, won 22.1%. Voter turnout was 53.9%.

At the 2006 Bosnian general election, Čavić lost in the race for president of Republika Srpska to his rival Milan Jelić (SNSD). Shortly afterwards he was blamed for the defeat and resigned as president of the SDS. The SDS was then split between two factions in conflicts: the reformists led by Čavić, and the conservatives backed by Dragan Kalinić, former President of the SDS.

On 11 December 2008, he announced at a press conference his retirement from the SDS and the launch of a new party, together with the RS MP Vojislav Gligić and Branislav Škobo, also former SDS MPs. On 15 January 2009 in Banja Luka Čavić registered the Democratic Party of Republika Srpska, whose co-founders are Momčilo Novaković, Gligić, Škobo and Đorđe Milićević. Since 2010, he has been a deputy of this party in the National Assembly of Republika Srpska.

At the 2012 municipal elections, Čavić run for mayor of Banja Luka; with 32.2% of the vote, he came second to Slobodan Gavranović (SNSD), elected with 40.2% of the votes.

In 2013, his Democratic Party merged with the National Democratic Party to form the National Democratic Movement.

== Honors ==
- Order of the Republika Srpska (2012)
