= Democratic Party of Republika Srpska =

Serbian political party in Bosnia and Herzegovina

Democratic Party of Republika Srpska Демократска партија
- President: Dragan Čavić
- Founded: 2009
- Dissolved: 2013; 13 years ago
- Split from: Serb Democratic Party
- Succeeded by: National Democratic Movement
- Headquarters: Nikole Tesle 1A, Banja Luka, Republika Srpska, Bosnia and Herzegovina
- Ideology: Conservatism
- Political position: Center-right

The Democratic Party of Republika Srpska (Serbian: Демократска Странка Републике Српске, Demokratska Stranka Republike Srpske) was a Serbian political party in Bosnia and Herzegovina.

== History ==
The party was established in 2009 by Dragan Čavić, who left the Serbian Democratic Party. In 2013 it merged with the National Democratic Party to form the National Democratic Movement.
