= Aleksandar Džombić =

Bosnian Serb politician (born 1968)

- Александар Џомбић
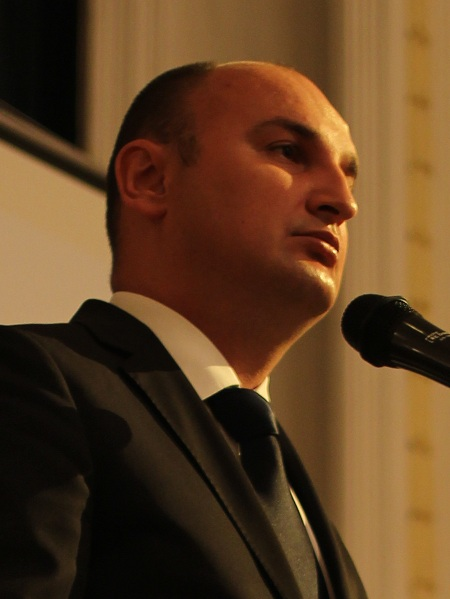
- Džombić in 2011

Prime Minister of Republika Srpska
- In office 29 December 2010 – 12 March 2013
- President: Milorad Dodik
- Preceded by: Anton Kasipović (acting)
- Succeeded by: Željka Cvijanović
Ministerial offices
Minister of Finance of Republika Srpska
In office 30 November 2006 – 29 December 2010
Preceded by	Svetlana Cenić
Succeeded by	Zoran Tegeltija

Personal details
- Born: 15 April 1968 (age 58) Čelinac, SR Bosnia and Herzegovina, SFR Yugoslavia
- Party: Alliance of Independent Social Democrats
- Spouse: Sana Džombić
- Children: 2
- Education: University of Banja Luka

Aleksandar Džombić (born 15 April 1968) is a Bosnian Serb politician who served as Prime Minister of Republika Srpska from 2010 to 2013. A member of the Alliance of Independent Social Democrats, he previously served as Minister of Finance of Republika Srpska from 2006 to 2010.

Džombić is currently the Managing Partner for Grant Thornton in Bosnia and Herzegovina.

== Early life and education ==
Džombić was born on 15 April 1968 in Čelinac, SR Bosnia and Herzegovina, SFR Yugoslavia. He graduated from the University of Banja Luka. He worked in the City Administration of Banja Luka, in Kristal Bank AD Banja Luka as a clerk, head of department and project manager, and in Agroprom Bank AD Banja Luka as director.

== Political career ==
Džombić is a member of the Alliance of Independent Social Democrats. He served as Minister of Finance of Republika Srpska from 30 November 2006 to 29 December 2010. He was then appointed Prime Minister of Republika Srpska, serving until 12 March 2013.

== Legal issues ==
On 17 January 2022, the District Court in Banja Luka confirmed the indictment for abuse of official position and authority against Džombić. The indictment was filed by the Republic Public Prosecutor's Office of Republika Srpska, Special Department for the Suppression of Corruption, Organised and Serious Forms of Economic Crime and as it announced in early January 2022, Džombić was charged with illegal granting of a loan from the Investment and Development Bank of Republika Srpska to the company "Energolinija" d.o.o. Zvornik in 2012 in the amount of 19,400,000 BAM (close to 10 million euros).

Džombić was ultimately acquitted on 27 October 2023. Had he been convicted, Džombić would have faced up to 15 years in prison.

== Personal life ==
Aleksandar is married to Sana Džombić and together they have one children.
