= Serbian Radical Party "9th January" =

The Serbian Radical Party "9th January" (Serbian: Српска радикална странка „9. јануар”), formerly Serbian Radical Party "Dr. Vojislav Šešelj" (Serbian: Српска радикална странка „др Војислав Шешељ“), is a minor Serbian nationalist party in Bosnia and Herzegovina, active in Republika Srpska. The party consisted of the Bosnian faction that remained under the wings of the Serbian Radical Party (SRS) and its leader Vojislav Šešelj after his departure to the Hague; the branch that split off was the Serbian Radical Party of Republika Srpska under the leadership of Milanko Mihajlica. The party's chairman is undetermined, it was Mirko Blagojević until 2013, and the party has since chosen Dragan Đurđević, though the former still claims leadership.

== Parliamentary elections ==
Parliament of Republika Srpska
Year	Popular vote	% of popular vote	# of seats	Seat change	Coalition	Government
2018	TBD	TBD	0 / 83			TBD
