= National Democratic Movement (Bosnia and Herzegovina) =

National Democratic Movement Народни демократски покрет Narodni demokratski pokret
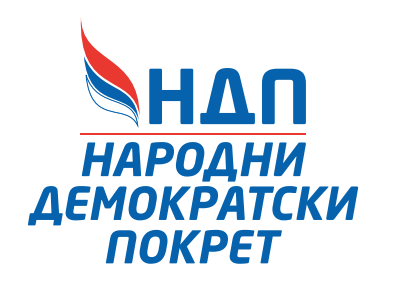
- President: Bojan Šapurić
- General Secretary: Aleksandar Lukić
- Founder: Dragan Čavić
- Founded: 9 June 2013
- Ideology: Conservatism; Pro-Europeanism
- Political position: Centre-right
- HoR BiH: 0 / 42
- HoP BiH: 1 / 15
- NA RS: 0 / 83

Website
- www.ndprs.org

The National Democratic Movement (Serbian: Народни демократски покрет/Narodni demokratski pokret, NDP) is a political party founded in Banja Luka, Republic of Srpska, Bosnia and Herzegovina led by Bojan Šapurić.

== History ==
The party was established on 9 June 2013 as a merger of the Democratic Party and the National Democratic Party. In April 2014 the New Socialist Party merged into the NDP. In the 2014 elections the party contested the national elections in an alliance with the Party of Democratic Progress, with the alliance winning a single seat in the national House of Representatives. The NDP contested the elections in Republika Srpska alone, winning five seats in the National Assembly.

== Presidents ==
#	President	Born-Died	Start date	End date
1.	Dragan Čavić	1958–	9 June 2013	10 June 2023
2.	Bojan Šapurić	1994–	10 June 2023	present

== Election results ==
From the SP-NDP-SNP coalition, five candidates secured seats in the National Assembly of the Republic of Srpska in the elections held in 2022.

Election	Votes	%	Seats	Status
2014	33,977	5.13%	5 / 83	Opposition
2018	28,183	4.12%	4 / 83	Government
2022	33,977	5.13%	5 / 83	Government
