= National Democratic Party (Bosnia and Herzegovina) =

The National Democratic Party (Serbian: Народна демократска странка, Narodna Demokratska Strakna, NDS) was a political party in Bosnia and Herzegovina.

== History ==
The party was established in 2003. It contested the 2006 general elections in an alliance with the Pensioners' Party, but failed to win a seat in either the national or Republika Srpska elections.

In 2010 the NDS contested both national and Republika Srpska elections. In the elections to the national House of Representatives, the party received 1.1% of the vote in Republika Srprska, failing to win a seat. In Republika Srprska elections the party received 2.1% of the vote, winning two seats.

In 2013 the party merged with the Democratic Party to form the National Democratic Movement.
