= Elections in Bosnia and Herzegovina =

At state level, Bosnia and Herzegovina votes for the rotating Presidency of Bosnia and Herzegovina and the Parliamentary Assembly. President is elected for a four-year term by constituencies referring to the three main ethnic groups. The candidate with the most votes in a constituency is elected. The Parliamentary Assembly (Parlamentarna Skupština) has two chambers. The House of Representatives (Predstavnički dom/Zastupnički dom) has 42 members, elected for a four-year term by proportional representation in each main ethnic group. The House of Peoples (Dom Naroda) has 15 members, appointed by the parliaments of the two Entities. Bosnia and Herzegovina has a multi-party system, with numerous political parties in which no one party has a chance of gaining power alone, and parties must work with each other to form coalition governments. Each main ethnic group has its own dominant political party.

== Schedule ==
=== Election ===
| Position | 2018 | 2019 | 2020 | 2021 | 2022 |
|---|---|---|---|---|---|
| Type | General elections (October) | None | Local elections (October) | None | General elections (October) |
| Presidency | All members | None | None | None | All members |
| Parliamentary Assembly | All seats | None | None | None | All seats |
| Cantons, cities and municipalities | none | None | All positions | None | none |

== Latest elections ==
=== 2026 presidential election ===
| Candidate | Party | Votes | % |
Bosniak member
| Denis Bećirović | Social Democratic Party | 222,484 | 38.10 |
| Bakir Izetbegović | Party of Democratic Action | 199,337 | 34.14 |
| Semir Efendić | Party for Bosnia and Herzegovina | 149,541 | 25.61 |
| Fahrudin Radončić | Union for a Better Future | 12,526 | 2.15 |
| Total | | 583,888 | 100.00 |
Croat member
| Darijana Filipović | Croatian Democratic Union | 120,701 | 47.28 |
| Slaven Kovačević | Democratic Front | 76,655 | 30.03 |
| Zdenko Lučić | Independent | 57,924 | 22.69 |
| Total | | 255,280 | 100.00 |
Serb member
| Željka Cvijanović | Alliance of Independent Social Democrats | 319,705 | 55.57 |
| Marinko Božović | Serb Democratic Party | 151,746 | 26.38 |
| Nebojša Vukanović | For Justice and Order | 103,871 | 18.05 |
| Total | | 575,322 | 100.00 |
| Valid votes | | 1,414,490 | 95.65 |
| Invalid/blank votes | | 64,403 | 4.35 |
| Total votes | | 1,478,893 | 100.00 |
| Registered voters/turnout | | 3,338,946 | 44.29 |
Source: Central Electoral Commission

=== 2026 parliamentary election ===
| Party | Votes | % | +/– | Seats | +/– |
|---|---|---|---|---|---|
| Party of Democratic Action | 266,930 | 19.72 | +2.51 | 9 | 0 |
| Alliance of Independent Social Democrats | 229,513 | 16.96 | +0.62 | 6 | 0 |
| Social Democratic Party | 122,764 | 9.07 | +0.97 | 5 | 0 |
| Croatian Democratic Union (Note: The coalition consisted of HDZ, HSP, HKDU, HSP AS, HDU, HSP HB and HRAST.) | 110,255 | 8.15 | –0.68 | 4 | 0 |
| Safe Srpska Movement (Note: The coalition consisted of PDP, which won 2 seats in the 2022 election, and NPSP.) | 81,851 | 6.05 | New | 2 | New |
| Party for Bosnia and Herzegovina | 74,573 | 5.51 | +3.84 | 3 | +3 |
| Serb Democratic Party | 71,489 | 5.28 | –1.78 | 2 | 0 |
| People and Justice–Social Democrats | 58,837 | 4.35 | –1.41 | 2 | –1 |
| Democratic Front–Civic Alliance | 51,088 | 3.77 | –2.65 | 2 | –1 |
| Croatian Five (Note: The coalition consisted of HDZ 1990 and HNP, which ran together in 2022 but failed to win any seats; HRS, which ran separately; HSS BiH and HD, which did not run.) | 36,637 | 2.71 | +0.35 | 1 | +1 |
| People's European Union–Forward!–Movement of Democratic Action | 33,324 | 2.46 | –1.45 | 1 | –1 |
| Our Party | 32,310 | 2.39 | –0.73 | 1 | –1 |
| For Justice and Order | 31,582 | 2.33 | +0.26 | 1 | 0 |
| Democratic People's Alliance–People's Party of Srpska | 29,416 | 2.17 | +0.80 | 1 | +1 |
| Socialist Party–Democratic Union | 25,769 | 1.90 | –1.47 | 1 | 0 |
| United Srpska | 23,747 | 1.75 | +0.23 | 1 | 0 |
| Socialist Party of Srpska–Goran Selak | 17,441 | 1.29 | New | 0 | New |
| People's Front | 11,554 | 0.85 | New | 0 | New |
| Union for a Better Future | 10,029 | 0.74 | –0.81 | 0 | 0 |
| Bosnian-Herzegovinian Initiative | 9,502 | 0.70 | –0.57 | 0 | –1 |
| Bosnian-Herzegovinian Greens | 8,359 | 0.62 | +0.41 | 0 | 0 |
| The Will of the People of Srpska | 7,200 | 0.53 | New | 0 | New |
| Labour Party | 3,594 | 0.27 | +0.04 | 0 | 0 |
| Republicans of Bosnia and Herzegovina | 2,876 | 0.21 | New | 0 | New |
| Red Lines | 2,726 | 0.20 | New | 0 | New |
| Total | 1,353,366 | 100.00 | – | 42 | 0 |
| Valid votes | 1,353,366 | 91.57 | | | |
| Invalid/blank votes | 124,607 | 8.43 | | | |
| Total votes | 1,477,973 | 100.00 | | | |
| Registered voters/turnout | 3,338,946 | 44.26 | | | |
Source: Central Electoral Commission

== See also ==
- Electoral calendar
- Electoral system
- Central Election Commission of Bosnia and Herzegovina, administrative body responsible for regulating and supervising Elections in Bosnia and Herzegovina
- Elections in Yugoslavia
