= 2nd electoral unit of the House of Representatives of Bosnia and Herzegovina (Federation of Bosnia and Herzegovina) =

Parliamentary constituency

2nd electoral unit of the Federation of Bosnia and Herzegovina
- House of Representatives of Bosnia and Herzegovina constituency
- Electoral unit within Bosnia and Herzegovina

Current constituency
- Created: 2000
- Seats: 3
- Representatives: Šerif Špago (SDA); Predrag Kožul (HDZ BiH); Antea Čilić (HDZ BiH)

The second electoral unit of the Federation of Bosnia and Herzegovina is a parliamentary constituency used to elect members to the House of Representatives of Bosnia and Herzegovina since 2000. It consists of Herzegovina-Neretva Canton and West Herzegovina Canton.

== Demographics ==
Ethnicity	Population	%
Bosniaks	92,723	29.3
Croats	212,022	66.9
Serbs	6,533	2.1
Did Not declare	1,830	0.6
Others	3,178	1
Unknown	619	0.2
Total	316,905	

== Representatives ==
Convocation	Representatives		
2000–2002	Sead Buturović (SDA)	Marofil Ljubić (HDZ BiH)	Miro Grabovac-Titan (HDZ BiH)
2002–2006	Fatima Leho (SDA)	Bariša Čolak (HDZ BiH)	Martin Raguž (HDZ 1990)
2006–2010	Edin Mušić (SDA)	Dragan Vrankić (HDZ BiH)	Martin Raguž (HDZ 1990)
2010–2014	Salko Sokolović (SDA)	Dragan Čović (HDZ BiH)	Božo Ljubić (HDZ 1990)
2014–2018	Salko Sokolović (SDA)	Vjekoslav Bevanda (HDZ BiH)	Monika Tomić (HDZ BiH)
2018–2022	Edin Mušić (SDA)	Predrag Kožul (HDZ BiH)	Darijana Filipović (HDZ BiH)
2022–2026	Šerif Špago (SDA)	Predrag Kožul (HDZ BiH)	Darijana Filipović (HDZ BiH)
2026-2030	Šerif Špago (SDA)	Predrag Kožul (HDZ BiH)	Antea Čilić (HDZ BiH)

== Election results ==
=== 2026 election ===
Party	Votes	%	Mandates
Croatian Democratic Union and allies	55,838	49.30	2
Party of Democratic Action	21,632	19.10	1
Croatian Five	15,12	13.35	0
Social Democratic Party	8,197	7.23	0
Democratic Front - Civic Alliance	3,304	2.91	0
People's European Union - Forward! - Movement of Democratic Action	2,476	2.18	0
Party for Bosnia and Herzegovina	2,231	1.96	0
People and Justice - Social Democrats	1,803	1.59	0
Our Party	1,103	0.97	0
Alliance of Independent Social Democrats	493	0.43	0
Republicans of Bosnia and Herzegovina	466	0.41	0
Union for a Better Future of BiH	383	0.33	0
Bosnian-Herzegovinian Greens	208	0.18	0

=== 2022 election ===
Party	Votes	Mandates
Croatian Democratic Union	70902	2
Party of Democratic Action	19280	1
HDZ 1990	12294	0
Social Democratic Party	11862	0
HRS	8508	0
DF	5984	0
NES	3835	0
People and Justice	2762	0
Party for Bosnia and Herzegovina	1805	0
Union for a Better Future of BiH	1305	0
PzP–NB	1226	0
Our Party	1099	0
Alliance of Independent Social Democrats	760	0
Bosnian Party	488	0
Bosnia and Herzegovina Greens	157	0
United Srpska	143	0
Party of Democratic Progress	68	0
Bosnia and Herzegovina Initiative	48	0
Union for New Politics	36	0
SMS	32	0
The Left Wing	23	0
Re-Balance	22	0
Circle	11	0

=== 2018 election ===
Party	Votes	%	Mandates
Croatian Democratic Union	68846	50.6	2
Party of Democratic Action	22355	16.43	1
HDZ 1990-HSP	14692	10.8	0
Social Democratic Party	11417	8.39	0
Democratic Front	6268	4.61	0
Union for a Better Future of BiH	5125	3.77	0
Our Party	1646	1.21	0
Independent Bloc	1406	1.03	0
Bosnian-Herzegovinian Patriotic Party	1237	0.91	0
Party for Bosnia and Herzegovina	1089	0.8	0
Alliance of Independent Social Democrats	1041	0.77	0
People and Justice	303	0.22	0
Party of Democratic Activity	251	0.18	0
Bosnian Party	186	0.14	0
Union for New Politics	157	0.12	0
Lijevo Krilo	35	0.03	0

=== 2014 election ===
Party	Votes	%	Mandates
HDZ–HSS–HKDU–HSP-AS BiH–HSP HB	54905	41947	2
Party of Democratic Action	21050	16082	1
Croatian Democratic Union 1990	15676	11976	0
Union for a Better Future of BiH	7957	6079	0
Social Democratic Party	7253	5541	0
Democratic Front	6934	5298	0
Hrvatski Savez Hkdu - Hrast	4080	3117	0
Bosnian-Herzegovinian Patriotic Party-Sefer Halilović	3877	2962	0
People's Party for Work and Betterment	2578	1970	0
SPP–SDU–DNZ	2504	1913	0
HSP–DSI	2403	1836	0
Party for Bosnia and Herzegovina	1327	1014	0
Social Democratic Union - Union for Us All	346	0.264	0
Diaspora Party	1016	0.825	0
Social Democratic Union - Union for Us All	250	0.203	0
Bosnian Party	179	0.145	0
HSP–DSI	121	0.098	0
Total valid	132456	100	

=== 2010 election ===
Party	Votes	%	Mandates
Croatian Democratic Union of BiH	50071	37.45	1
Croatian Democratic Union 1990	25134	18.80	1
Party of Democratic Action	16755	12.53	1
Social Democratic Party	15267	11.42	0
People's Party for Work and Betterment	8676	6.49	0
Union for a Better Future of BiH	8585	6.42	0
Party for Bosnia and Herzegovina	5055	3.78	0
Patriotic Party	1746	1.31	0
Jump Cacaus	896	0.67	0
Our Party	561	0.42	0
Democratic Party of the disabled	519	0.39	0
Bosnian Party	453	0.34	0
Total valid	133718	100	

=== 2006 election ===
Party	Votes	%	Mandates
HDZ-HNZ	27004	23.72	1
Croatian Democratic Union 1990	26288	23.09	1
Party of Democratic Action	17300	15.20	1
Party for Bosnia and Herzegovina	13895	12.20	0
Croatian Party of Rights	8563	7.52	0
Social Democratic Party	6634	5.83	0
People's Party for Work and Betterment	4664	4.10	0
Patriotic Party	2973	2.61	0
Alliance of Independent Social Democrats	1428	1.25	0
Pensioners' Party	1155	1.01	0
Liberal Democratic Party	666	0.58	0
Bosnian Patriotic Block	605	0.53	0
Democratic Party of the disabled	531	0.47	0
Movement for changes	508	0.45	0
Youth Political Movement	465	0.41	0
Bosnian National Party	278	0.24	0
European Ecological Party	253	0.22	0
Civil Democratic Party	217	0.19	0
Socialist Party	177	0.16	0
Democratic People's Union	107	0.09	0
Justice and Morals	90	0.08	0
Bosansko Podrinjska Narodna Stranka	47	0.04	0
Total valid	96721	100	

=== 2002 election ===
Party	Votes	Mandates
Croatian Democratic Union- Democrats	55587	2
Party of Democratic Action	16648	1

=== 2000 election ===
Party	Votes	Mandates
Croatian Democratic Union	82754	2
Party of Democratic Action	17711	1
