= 2026 West Herzegovina parliamentary election =

Cantonal election in Bosnia and Herzegovina

- 4 October 2026
- All 23 seats in the Assembly of the West Herzegovina Canton; 12 seats needed for a majority
- Turnout: 40.92% (▼15.86 pp) (Note: Turnout is calculated from 31,655 ballots cast and the 77,362 registered voters listed in the Central Election Commission decision for the register as at 4 October 2026. The change is relative to 56.78% in 2022.)
Party	Leader	Vote %	Seats	+/–
HDZ BiH	Dario Knezović	72.58	17	+3
HDZ 1990–HSS	Josip Pinjuh	9.84	2	−2
HRS	Tomislav Bandić	8.08	2	0
HSP BiH	Zvonko Jurišić	4.38	1	0
HSP Dr. AS BiH–HSP HB BiH	Ante Paponja	4.23	1	−1
This lists parties that won seats. See the complete results below.
Prime Minister before
Predrag Čović; HDZ BiH

The 2026 West Herzegovina parliamentary election was held on 4 October 2026 to elect all 23 members of the Assembly of the West Herzegovina Canton in West Herzegovina Canton, one of the ten cantons of the Federation of Bosnia and Herzegovina. It participated in the 2026 Bosnian general election.

According to the published results, the Croatian Democratic Union of Bosnia and Herzegovina (HDZ BiH) received the most votes and won 17 of the 23 seats, up three from 2022.

== Results ==
Results were reported from all 123 polling stations (100.00%). The count comprised 29,667 valid votes and 1,988 invalid ballots.

Final results
Party or alliance	Votes	%	Seats	Change from 2022 (Note: HDZ BiH is compared with the 2022 HDZ BiH–HDU–HSS–HKDU coalition; HDZ 1990–HSS with the 2022 HDZ 1990 list; and HSP Dr. AS BiH–HSP HB BiH with the combined two seats won by its constituent parties in 2022.)
HDZ BiH	21,534	72.58	17	+3
HDZ 1990–HSS	2,921	9.84	2	−2
HRS	2,398	8.08	2	0
HSP BiH	1,300	4.38	1	0
HSP Dr. AS BiH–HSP HB BiH	1,257	4.23	1	−1
SDP BiH	257	0.86	0	0
Total	29,667	100.00	23	0
Source: Central Election Commission of Bosnia and Herzegovina (votes and seat allocation; 2022 results for comparison).

Ballot totals and turnout
Ballot category	Number	% of ballots cast
Valid votes	29,667	93.72
Invalid votes, excluding blank ballots	1,472	4.65
Blank ballots	516	1.63
Total ballots cast	31,655	100.00
Registered voters (registered as at 4 October 2026)	77,362	—
Turnout	40.92% (▼15.86 pp)	
Source: Central Election Commission of Bosnia and Herzegovina.

Votes by voting method
Party or alliance	Regular	Postal	Absentee, mobile team and diplomatic/consular	Tendered	Total
HDZ BiH	21,133	37	332	32	21,534
HDZ 1990–HSS	2,887	15	10	9	2,921
HRS	2,371	6	8	13	2,398
HSP BiH	1,291	3	3	3	1,300
HSP Dr. AS BiH–HSP HB BiH	1,247	5	4	1	1,257
SDP BiH	235	14	8	0	257
Total	29,164	80	365	58	29,667
Source: Central Election Commission of Bosnia and Herzegovina.
