= 2022 West Herzegovina parliamentary election =

Cantonal election in Bosnia and Herzegovina

- 2 October 2022
- All 23 seats in the Assembly of the West Herzegovina Canton; 12 seats needed for a majority
- Turnout: 56.78% (▲5.18 pp)
| Party | Leader | Vote % | Seats | +/– |
|---|---|---|---|---|
| HDZ BiH–HDU–HSS–HKDU | Zdenko Ćosić | 63.26 | 14 | −2 |
| HDZ 1990 | Antonija Banožić | 15.85 | 4 | +1 |
| HRS | Ivan Landeka | 7.50 | 2 | 0 |
| HSP BiH | Zvonko Jurišić | 4.82 | 1 | 0 |
| HSP Dr. AS BiH | Marija Lovrić | 4.19 | 1 | 0 |
| HSP HB BiH | Zrinko Čuvalo | 3.50 | 1 | +1 |
This lists parties that won seats. See the complete results below.
| Prime Minister before | Prime Minister after |
|---|---|
| Zdenko Ćosić; HDZ BiH | Predrag Čović; HDZ BiH |

The 2022 West Herzegovina parliamentary election was held on 2 October 2022 to elect all 23 members of the Assembly of the West Herzegovina Canton in West Herzegovina Canton, one of the ten cantons of the Federation of Bosnia and Herzegovina. It was part of the 2022 Bosnian general election.

The HDZ BiH–HDU–HSS–HKDU coalition retained its absolute majority, winning 14 of the 23 seats, two fewer than in 2018.

== Results ==
Results were reported from all 120 polling stations (100.00%). Ten lists contested the election, with 138 candidates. There were 40,909 valid votes and 1,423 invalid ballots. The results were certified on 2 November 2022. Percentages are reproduced as reported; rounding may cause totals to differ from 100%.

Certified results
| Party or alliance | Votes | % | Seats | Change from 2018 (Note: The HDZ BiH–HDU–HSS–HKDU coalition is compared with the HDZ BiH-led list in 2018; HDZ 1990 is compared with the Hrvatsko zajedništvo coalition led by that party.) |
|---|---|---|---|---|
| HDZ BiH–HDU–HSS–HKDU | 25,880 | 63.26 | 14 | −2 |
| HDZ 1990 | 6,483 | 15.85 | 4 | +1 |
| HRS | 3,068 | 7.50 | 2 | 0 |
| HSP BiH | 1,971 | 4.82 | 1 | 0 |
| HSP Dr. AS BiH | 1,713 | 4.19 | 1 | 0 |
| HSP HB BiH | 1,430 | 3.50 | 1 | +1 |
| SDP BiH | 270 | 0.66 | 0 | 0 |
| BOSS | 51 | 0.12 | 0 | 0 |
| HNP | 24 | 0.06 | 0 | 0 |
| HSS SR | 19 | 0.05 | 0 | 0 |
| Total | 40,909 | 100.00 | 23 | |
Source: Central Election Commission of Bosnia and Herzegovina.

Ballot totals and turnout
| Ballot category | Number | % of ballots cast |
|---|---|---|
| Valid votes | 40,909 | 96.64 |
| Invalid votes, excluding blank ballots | 1,213 | 2.87 |
| Blank ballots | 210 | 0.50 |
| Total ballots cast | 42,332 | 100.00 |
| Registered voters | 74,553 | — |
| Turnout | 56.78% | |
Source: Central Election Commission of Bosnia and Herzegovina.

Votes by voting method
| Party or alliance | Regular | Postal | Absentee, mobile team and diplomatic/consular | Tendered | Total |
|---|---|---|---|---|---|
| HDZ BiH–HDU–HSS–HKDU | 25,515 | 106 | 258 | 1 | 25,880 |
| HDZ 1990 | 6,465 | 2 | 16 | 0 | 6,483 |
| HRS | 3,054 | 6 | 8 | 0 | 3,068 |
| HSP BiH | 1,963 | 4 | 4 | 0 | 1,971 |
| HSP Dr. AS BiH | 1,710 | 1 | 2 | 0 | 1,713 |
| HSP HB BiH | 1,426 | 3 | 1 | 0 | 1,430 |
| SDP BiH | 226 | 36 | 8 | 0 | 270 |
| BOSS | 39 | 12 | 0 | 0 | 51 |
| HNP | 22 | 0 | 2 | 0 | 24 |
| HSS SR | 19 | 0 | 0 | 0 | 19 |
| Total | 40,439 | 170 | 299 | 1 | 40,909 |
Source: Central Election Commission of Bosnia and Herzegovina.

== Government formation ==
On 27 March 2023, the Assembly confirmed a new government headed by Predrag Čović, who succeeded Zdenko Ćosić as prime minister. The formal handover took place on 31 March 2023.
