= Croatian Five =

Political coalition of Croat political parties in Bosnia and Herzegovina

Croatian Five Hrvatska petorka
- Leader: Collective leadership
- Founded: 22 January 2026; 9 months ago
- Headquarters: Mostar
- Ideology: Conservatism; Anti-corruption; Croatian nationalism Pro-Europeanism
- Political position: Centre-right
- HoR BiH: 1 / 42
- HoP BiH: 1 / 15
- HoR FBiH: 6 / 98
- HoP FBiH: 5 / 80

Website
- hrvatskapetorka.ba

The Croatian Five (Croatian: Hrvatska petorka, H5) is a political alliance in Bosnia and Herzegovina, formed ahead of the 2026 general election. The alliance consists of the Croatian Democratic Union 1990, Croatian Republican Party, Croatian Peasant Party, Croatian Democratic Alliance and Croatian National Shift.

== History ==
Formed in April 2025 as an unofficial coalition, and formalized on 22 January 2026, ahead of the Bosnian general elections, the alliance was createad as a unified Croat opposition to the Croatian Democratic Union and their governance in the country, entity and cantons.

=== 2026 general election ===
For the 2026 general election, the coalition selected Zdenko Lučić, a lawyer and former Croatian Defence Council brigadier general, as its candidate for Croat member of the Presidency of Bosnia and Herzegovina. In the election, Lučić earned 22.69% of the vote and failed to get elected; Croatian Democratic Union member Darijana Filipović won with 47.28% of the vote, while Democratic Front candidate Slaven Kovačević obtained 30.03%. The alliance also contested the House of Representatives election together, winning one seat for Ilija Cvitanović.

== Member parties ==
Name	Abbr.	Leader	Position	Ideology
Croatian Democratic Union 1990; Hrvatska demokratska zajednica 1990	HDZ 1990	Ilija Cvitanović	Centre-right	Christian democracy Pro-Europeanism; Croatian nationalism
Croatian Republican Party; Hrvatska republikanska stranka	HRS	Slaven Raguž	Centre-right	Conservatism; Pro-Europeanism; Croatian nationalism
Croatian Peasant Party; Hrvatska seljačka stranka Bosne i Hercegovine	HSS BiH	Mario Karamatić	Centre	Agrarianism; Croatian nationalism
Croatian Democratic Alliance; Hrvatski demokratski savez	HDS	Ivo Tadić	Centre-right	Regionalism; Croatian nationalism
Croatian National Shift; Hrvatski nacionalni pomak	HNP	Ivan Vukadin	Centre-right	Conservatism; Regionalism

== Election results ==
=== Parliamentary Assembly of Bosnia and Herzegovina ===
Parliamentary Assembly of Bosnia and Herzegovina
Year	Popular vote	%	HoR	Seat change	HoP	Seat change	Government
2026	36,637	2.71	1 / 42	New	TBD	TBD	TBD

=== Presidency elections ===
Presidency of Bosnia and Herzegovina
Election year	#	Candidate	Votes	%	Representing	Elected?
2026	3rd	Zdenko Lučić	57,924	22.69	Croats	No
