= 9th electoral unit of the House of Representatives of the Federation of Bosnia and Herzegovina =

Parliamentary constituency

9th electoral unit
- House of Representatives of the Federation of Bosnia and Herzegovina constituency
- Electoral unit within the Federation of Bosnia and Herzegovina

Current constituency
- Created: 2000
- Seats: 12 (2000-2002); 8 (2002-present)

The ninth electoral unit of the Federation of Bosnia and Herzegovina is a parliamentary constituency used to elect members to the House of Representatives of the Federation of Bosnia and Herzegovina since 2000. It consists of Herzegovina-Neretva Canton.

== Demographics ==
Ethnicity	Population	%
Bosniaks	92,005	41.4
Croats	118,297	53.3
Serbs	6,432	2.9
Did Not declare	1,764	0.8
Others	3,054	1.4
Unknown	455	0.2
Total	222,007	

== Representatives ==
Convocation	Representatives											
2000-2002	Salko Sokolović (SDA)	Omer Hujdur (SDA)	Josip Merdžo (HDZ)	Jerko Pavličević (HDZ)	Frano Ljubić (HDZ)	Ivica Karlović (HDZ)	Nermin Nikšić (SDP)	Dževad Hadžihusejnović (SBiH)	Sead Đulić (SDP)	Enver Kreso (SBiH)	Jasna Zlomislić (HDZ)	Ivan Vrankić (HDZ)
2002-2006	Salko Sokolović (SDA)	Omer Hujdur (SDA)	Josip Merdžo (HDZ)	Dragan Vrankić (HDZ	Željko Raguž (HDZ)	Vesna Čović (HDZ)	Nermin Nikšić (SDP)	Ahmed Jusufbegović (SBiH)	8 seats			
2006-2010	Zijat Mušić (SDA)	Enver Mujala (SDA)	Vjekoslav Mandić (HDZ)	Miroslav Ćorić (HDZ)	Jure Musa (HDZ 1990)	Jozo Ivančević (HDZ 1990)	Nermin Nikšić (SDP)	Safet Omerović (SBiH)	8 seats			
2010-2014	Edin Mušić (SDA)	Enver Mujala (SDA)	Mladen Bošković (HDZ)	Vjekoslav Bevanda (HDZ)	Davor Pehar (HDZ)	Srećko Boras (HDZ 1990)	Nermin Nikšić (SDP)	Nihad Alikadić (SBB)	8 seats			
2014-2018	Edin Mušić (SDA)	Salmir Kaplan (SDA)	Mladen Bošković (HDZ)	Darijana Filipović (HDZ)	Marin Barbarić (HDZ)	Zdravko Kuzman (HDZ 1990)	Nermin Nikšić (SDP)	Faruk Ćupina (SBB)	8 seats			
2018-2022	Osman Ćatić (SDA)	Salmir Kaplan (SDA)	Mladen Bošković (HDZ)	Jelka Miličević (HDZ)	Goran Opsenica (HDZ)	Luka Faletar (HDZ 1990)	Lana Prlić (SDP)	Ahmed Džubur (DF)	8 seats			
2022-2026	Edin Mušić (SDA)	Sanel Kajan (DF)	Mladen Bošković (HDZ)	Antonio Sesar (HDZ)	Vlatka Martinović (HDZ)	Luka Faletar (HDZ 1990)	Aner Žuljević (SDP)	Slaven Raguž (HRS)	8 seats			
2026-2030	Kenan Greda (SDA)	Haris Šabanović (SDA)	Slaven Zeljko (HDZ)	Andrijana Katić (HDZ)	Marija Buhač (HDZ)	Kristina Šimović (HDZ)	Lana Prlić (SDP)	Slaven Raguž (HRS)	8 seats			
