= 2026 Bosnian general election =

- 4 October 2026
- Turnout: 43.39% (presidential) ▼8.06 pp 43.36% (parliamentary) ▼8.09 pp
- Bosniak member of the presidency

Candidate	Denis Bećirović	Bakir Izetbegović
Party	SDP BiH	SDA
Popular vote	222,484	199,337
Percentage	38.10%	34.14%
- Results by municipality for the Bosniak member of the Presidency
- Croat member of the presidency

Candidate	Darijana Filipović	Slaven Kovačević
Party	HDZ BiH	DF
Popular vote	120,701	76,655
Percentage	47.28%	30.03%
- Results by municipality for the Croat member of the Presidency
- Serb member of the presidency
Candidate	Željka Cvijanović	Marinko Božović
Party	SNSD	SDS
Popular vote	319,705	151,746
Percentage	55.57%	26.38%
- Results by municipality for the Serb member of the Presidency
Presidency members before election
Denis Bećirović (Bosniak)
Željko Komšić (Croat)
Željka Cvijanović (Serb)
Elected Presidency members
Denis Bećirović (Bosniak)
Darijana Filipović (Croat)
Željka Cvijanović (Serb)
- House of Representatives
- All 42 seats in the House of Representatives; 22 seats needed for a majority
Party	Leader	Vote %	Seats	+/–
SDA	Bakir Izetbegović	19.72	9	0
SNSD	Milorad Dodik	16.96	6	0
SDP BiH	Nermin Nikšić	9.07	5	0
HDZ BiH	Dragan Čović	8.15	4	0
PSS (Note: The coalition consisted of PDP, which won 2 seats in the 2022 election, and NPSP.)	Draško Stanivuković	6.05	2	New
SBiH	Semir Efendić	5.51	3	+3
SDS	Branko Blanuša	5.28	2	0
NiP–SD BiH	Elmedin Konaković	4.35	2	−1
DF–GS	Željko Komšić	3.77	2	−1
H5 (Note: The coalition consisted of HDZ 1990 and HNP, which ran together in 2022 but failed to win any seats; HRS, which ran separately; HSS BiH and HD, which did not run.)	Ilija Cvitanović	2.71	1	+1
NES–PDA–NPD	Nermin Ogrešević	2.46	1	−1
NS	Sabina Ćudić	2.39	1	−1
ZPR	Nebojša Vukanović	2.33	1	0
DNS–NPS	Nenad Nešić	2.17	1	+1
SP–DEMOS	Petar Đokić	1.90	1	0
US	Nenad Stevandić	1.75	1	0
This lists parties that won seats. See the complete results below.

Chairwoman before
Borjana Krišto; HDZ BiH

General elections were held in Bosnia and Herzegovina on 4 October 2026. They decided the makeup of the presidency as well as national, entity and cantonal governments. Voter turnout was 43.39% for the presidential election, and 43.36% for the parliamentary election, the lowest ever voter turnout for a general election in Bosnia and Herzegovina.

These were the first elections in Bosnia and Herzegovina in which new Specific election technologies were officially used. These technologies ensured the highest possible integrity of the elections throughout the country. Electronic ballot counting, electronic voter identification, and video surveillance (recording of polling stations and counting centers) were introduced.

Incumbent presidency members Denis Bećirović and Željka Cvijanović were eligible for re-election, while Željko Komšić was ineligible to run for a third consecutive term. Bećirović of the Social Democratic Party (SDP BiH) and Cvijanović of the Alliance of Independent Social Democrats (SNSD) were re-elected to a second term, representing the Bosniaks and Serbs respectively, while Croatian Democratic Union (HDZ BiH) member Darijana Filipović was elected for the first time to represent the Croats.

The Party of Democratic Action emerged as the largest party in the House of Representatives for the fourth consecutive time, winning 19.72% of the vote, its largest vote share since the 2002 election. The SNSD earned 16.96%, the largest for the party since the 2006 election. They both won the same seat share as in 2022. The Troika alliance (comprising the SDP BiH, People and Justice and Our Party), which governed alongside the SNSD and the HDZ BiH after the 2022 election, suffered a drop in its vote and seat total; while the SDP BiH saw an increase in its vote share as opposed to 2022, retaining the same amount of seats, both People and Justice and Our Party lost a seat each. The HDZ BiH and the Serb Democratic Party (SDS) repeated their result from the previous election, winning 4 and 2 seats respectively, although the SDS recorded its lowest ever vote share in a general election. The Party for Bosnia and Herzegovina under Semir Efendić more than doubled its vote total from four years ago, earning seats in the House of Representatives for the first time since 2010. The newly established Safe Srpska Movement, consisting among others of the Party of Democratic Progress, won two seats.

== Background ==
=== Amendment to the Election Law ===
On 26 March 2024, Christian Schmidt, the High Representative for Bosnia and Herzegovina, issued a decree amending the country's Election Law to strengthen election integrity across the nation. In response, on 19 April, Republika Srpska adopted its own election law, which would establish a new entity-level election commission that would oversee all electoral processes within the entity. Milorad Dodik, Republika Srpska president, pledged that the entity would enforce its own Election Law in the 2026 general election.

=== Political background of the governing coalition ===
Following the 2022 election, a coalition led by the Alliance of Independent Social Democrats (SNSD), the Croatian Democratic Union (HDZ BiH) and the liberal alliance Troika reached an agreement on the formation of a new government, designating HDZ BiH deputy president Borjana Krišto as the new chairwoman of the Council of Ministers.

In January 2025, Troika announced that it was rescinding its support for the coalition with the SNSD, following the latter failing to vote for two laws concentrated on European Union accession. The legislation was ultimately passed with votes from the SNSD's opposition in Republika Srpska. Since then, Krišto has been accused of intentionally ignoring the appointment of Troika-backed Republika Srpska opposition politician and outspoken Dodik critic Nebojša Vukanović as the new minister of security following the office's vacancy in January 2025. Krišto's actions sparked up renewed stories of the SNSD's and HDZ BiH's long-standing relations. Some opposition parties have called for Krišto's resignation and for a vote of no confidence.

=== Indictment and trial of Milorad Dodik ===
Milorad Dodik (pictured) was removed from the office of president of Republika Srpska following his conviction in 2025

In February 2025, Bosnian Serb leader Milorad Dodik was convicted by the Court of Bosnia and Herzegovina in a first-instance verdict and was sentenced to one year imprisonment, and was also banned from performing the duties of the president of Republika Srpska for six years due to anti-constitutional conduct. Dodik refused to recognize the ruling and introduced laws barring federal law enforcement agencies from operating in Republika Srpska, prompting the Court of Bosnia and Herzegovina to issue arrest warrants against him and other senior officials of Republika Srpska in March 2025. The court also requested the issuance of an international arrest warrant against Dodik and Republika Srpska National Assembly speaker Nenad Stevandić from Interpol. Ultimately, Interpol rejected the request for the arrest warrant, deeming the persecution of Dodik and Stevandić as politically motivated.

On 4 July 2025, Dodik voluntarily appeared before the Court of Bosnia and Herzegovina. The hearing was conducted following a motion submitted by the Prosecutor’s Office of Bosnia and Herzegovina. Acting upon the motion, the Court issued a decision revoking the previously ordered arrest warrant against Dodik, replacing it with a precautionary measure only requiring him to report periodically to a designated state authority.

On 1 August 2025, the first-instance verdict against Dodik from February of that year was confirmed by the court's Appellate panel. On 6 August, the Central Election Commission of Bosnia and Herzegovina ordered Dodik's removal as president of Republika Srpska, a decision which would take effect after an appeals period expired. On 12 August, the Bosnian state court commuted his one year prison sentence to a fine of 36,500 Bosnian marks. On 18 August, Dodik's appeal against the decision of the Central Election Commission was rejected and his mandate as Republika Srpska president was officially terminated, with the termination date marked as 12 June 2025, due to the Bosnian state court's verdict becoming legally binding on that day. The National Assembly of Republika Srpska initially rejected the court's decision and supported Dodik as the president, but eventually accepted it in October 2025.

Consequently, the Central Election Commission announced that early presidential elections in Republika Srpska for a shortened, ten-month term, were scheduled to be held on 23 November 2025. Dodik and the SNSD initially refused to take part in the election, however they later confirmed that they would participate. Conversely, the opposition in Republika Srpska immediately decided to participate.

=== Satirical campaigns ===
Since early 2026, a satirical campaign built around a fictional pigeon, Mehmed Golubović Jr., has appeared on posters in several cities and on social media in Bosnia and Herzegovina. The pigeon is presented as a candidate for all three Presidency seats, promising among other things, sending the local dish sirnica to space, flying trains and abolishing the presidency, but its authors state that it is a satirical project and that Mehmed Golubović Jr. is not on the ballot. The campaign encourages voters to cast invalid ballots as a form of political protest by pointing out that Golubović is not officially eligible to stand for the Presidency and that "pigeons still do not have the right to run for office." The same "candidate" was also in the 2024 municipal elections.

== Electoral system ==
Official logo of the election

=== National elections ===
==== Presidency ====
The three members of the Presidency are elected by plurality. In Republika Srpska voters elect the Serb representative, whilst in the Federation of Bosnia and Herzegovina voters elect the Bosniak and Croat representatives. Voters registered in the Federation of Bosnia and Herzegovina can vote for either the Bosniak or Croat candidate, but cannot vote in both elections.

==== House of Representatives ====
The House of Representatives, the lower chamber of the Bosnian Parliament, has 42 members who are elected at entity level according to proportional representation. Voters in the Brčko District are free to vote for the Republika Srpska or Federal constituency. The Federation sends 28 representatives to parliament, while Republika Srpska send 14 of them. Of the 28 representatives of the Federation, 21 are elected in five multi-person units (number of deputies 3-6), to ensure proportionality, seven compensatory mandates according to the Sainte-Laguë procedure. Of the 14 MPs of Republika Srpska, nine are elected in the units (three MPs each) and five via compensatory mandates. There is a three percent threshold at the entity level.

=== Elections in the Federation of Bosnia and Herzegovina ===
==== Presidency ====
Unlike in Republika Srpska, the president of the Federation and the two vice-presidents are not elected by direct election: The first chamber of the Federal Parliament, the House of Peoples, nominates candidates for the presidency and the vice-presidencies, followed by the second chamber, the House of Representatives, must confirm this nomination by election. Subsequently, confirmation by the majority of the delegates of all three constitutive ethnic groups in the House of Peoples is required.

==== House of Representatives ====
The House of Representatives of the Federation of Bosnia and Herzegovina has a total of 98 members who are elected by proportional representation. The election takes place in 12 multi-person constituencies with entity-wide balancing mandates. In the Federal House of Representatives, each constitutive ethnic group should be represented by at least four members. The threshold is three percent.

==== Cantonal Assemblies ====
The assemblies of the 10 cantons of the Federation are also elected. The election is based on proportional representation with a threshold of three percent. The individual cantonal assemblies send members to the House of Peoples.

=== Elections in Republika Srpska ===
==== Presidency ====
There is a list of candidates, whereby the candidate who gets the most votes (usually a Serb) is elected president; there is no runoff. The first-placed candidates from the other two ethnic groups (usually a Bosniak and a Croat) are elected as vice-presidents. The term of office of the President of Republika Srpska is four years with an option for one-time re-election. A renewed candidacy is possible again after a break of at least one term of office.

==== National Assembly ====
The lower chamber of Republika Srpska, the National Assembly, is composed of 83 members elected by proportional representation. The election takes place in nine multi-person constituencies with entity-wide balancing mandates. Furthermore, at least four representatives should be represented in the National Assembly from each of the constitutive peoples. There is a three percent threshold.

== Presidency candidates ==
Individuals in this section have declared their candidacy for Presidency member.

=== Bosniak member election ===
Candidate	Affiliation	Background	Reference
Denis Bećirović	Social Democratic Party	Member of the Presidency (2022–present); Member of the House of Peoples (2019–2022)	
Bakir Izetbegović	Party of Democratic Action	Member of the Presidency (2010–2018); President of the Party of Democratic Action (2014–present)	
Semir Efendić	Party for Bosnia and Herzegovina	Municipal mayor of Novi Grad Sarajevo (2012–present); President of the Party for Bosnia and Herzegovina (2021–present)	
Fahrudin Radončić	Union for a Better Future	Member of the House of Peoples (2015–2019); President of the Union for a Better Future (2009–present)	

=== Croat member election ===
Candidate	Affiliation	Background	Reference
Darijana Filipović	Croatian Democratic Union	Member of the national House of Representatives (2018–present); Member of the Federal House of Representatives (2014–2018)	
Slaven Kovačević	Democratic Front	Advisor to the Croat member of the Presidency (2018–present)	
Zdenko Lučić	Independent	Member of the Federal House of Representatives (1998–2001); Croatian Defence Council Brigadier general (1992–1995)	

=== Serb member election ===
Candidate	Affiliation	Background	Reference
Željka Cvijanović	Alliance of Independent Social Democrats	Member of the Presidency (2022–present); President of Republika Srpska (2018–2022)	
Nebojša Vukanović	For Justice and Order	Member of the National Assembly of Republika Srpska (2018–present); President of For Justice and Order (2014–present)	
Marinko Božović	Serb Democratic Party	Municipal mayor of Istočna Ilidža (2016–present); Member of the National Assembly of Republika Srpska (2014–2016)	

== Endorsements ==
Denis Bećirović

Political parties

- Our Party
- People and Justice
- People's European Union
- Bosnian-Herzegovinian Initiative
- Forward
- People's Power
- Movement of Democratic Action
- Pensioners' Party of Bosnia and Herzegovina
- Social Democrats
- Bosnian-Herzegovinian Patriotic Party
Semir Efendić

Political parties

- Movement for a Modern and Active Krajina
Darijana Filipović

Political parties

- Croatian Democratic Union (Croatia)
- Croatian Alliance HKDU-HRAST

Heads of state and government

- Andrej Plenković, Prime Minister of Croatia

Deputies

- Željana Zovko, member of the European Parliament
Slaven Kovačević

Political parties

- Civic Alliance
Zdenko Lučić

Political parties

- Croatian Democratic Union 1990
- Croatian Republican Party
- Croatian National Shift
- Croatian Democratic Alliance
- Croatian Peasant Party
- Ramska National Party
- Čapljina Independent Party - Čapljina in Heart
Željka Cvijanović

Political parties

- Socialist Party
- Democratic Union
- United Srpska
- Democratic People's Alliance
- Socialist Party of Srpska
Marinko Božović

Political parties

- Party of Democratic Progress
- Safe Srpska Movement
- National Front (Bosnia and Herzegovina)

== Results ==
=== Presidency ===
Candidate	Party	Votes	%
Bosniak member
Denis Bećirović	Social Democratic Party	222,484	38.10
Bakir Izetbegović	Party of Democratic Action	199,337	34.14
Semir Efendić	Party for Bosnia and Herzegovina	149,541	25.61
Fahrudin Radončić	Union for a Better Future	12,526	2.15
Total		583,888	100.00
Croat member
Darijana Filipović	Croatian Democratic Union	120,701	47.28
Slaven Kovačević	Democratic Front	76,655	30.03
Zdenko Lučić	Independent	57,924	22.69
Total		255,280	100.00
Serb member
Željka Cvijanović	Alliance of Independent Social Democrats	319,705	55.57
Marinko Božović	Serb Democratic Party	151,746	26.38
Nebojša Vukanović	For Justice and Order	103,871	18.05
Total		575,322	100.00
Valid votes		1,414,490	95.65
Invalid/blank votes		64,403	4.35
Total votes		1,478,893	100.00
Registered voters/turnout		3,408,524	43.39
Source: Central Electoral Commission

=== House of Representatives ===
Party	Votes	%	+/–	Seats	+/–
Party of Democratic Action	266,930	19.72	+2.51	9	0
Alliance of Independent Social Democrats	229,513	16.96	+0.62	6	0
Social Democratic Party	122,764	9.07	+0.97	5	0
Croatian Democratic Union (Note: The coalition consisted of HDZ, HSP, HKDU, HSP AS, HDU, HSP HB and HRAST.)	110,255	8.15	–0.68	4	0
Safe Srpska Movement	81,851	6.05	New	2	New
Party for Bosnia and Herzegovina	74,573	5.51	+3.84	3	+3
Serb Democratic Party	71,489	5.28	–1.78	2	0
People and Justice–Social Democrats	58,837	4.35	–1.41	2	–1
Democratic Front–Civic Alliance	51,088	3.77	–2.65	2	–1
Croatian Five	36,637	2.71	+0.35	1	+1
People's European Union–Movement of Democratic Action–Forward!	33,324	2.46	–1.45	1	–1
Our Party	32,310	2.39	–0.73	1	–1
For Justice and Order	31,582	2.33	+0.26	1	0
Democratic People's Alliance–People's Party of Srpska	29,416	2.17	+0.80	1	+1
Socialist Party–Democratic Union	25,769	1.90	–1.47	1	0
United Srpska	23,747	1.75	+0.23	1	0
Socialist Party of Srpska–Goran Selak	17,441	1.29	New	0	New
People's Front	11,554	0.85	New	0	New
Union for a Better Future	10,029	0.74	–0.81	0	0
Bosnian-Herzegovinian Initiative	9,502	0.70	–0.57	0	–1
Bosnian-Herzegovinian Greens	8,359	0.62	+0.41	0	0
The Will of the People of Srpska	7,200	0.53	New	0	New
Labour Party	3,594	0.27	+0.04	0	0
Republicans of Bosnia and Herzegovina	2,876	0.21	New	0	New
Red Lines	2,726	0.20	New	0	New
Total	1,353,366	100.00	–	42	0
Valid votes	1,353,366	91.57			
Invalid/blank votes	124,607	8.43			
Total votes	1,477,973	100.00			
Registered voters/turnout	3,408,524	43.36			
Source: Central Electoral Commission

=== By electoral unit ===
==== Federation of Bosnia and Herzegovina ====
Electoral Unit	SDA	SDP BiH	HDZ BiH	SBiH	NiP-SD BiH	DF–GS	C5	NES–PDA–NPD	NS
1st	26.62	11.81	9.16	5.50	4.38	5.45	9.15	16.06	2.70
2nd	19.10	7.23	49.30	1.96	1.59	2.91	13.35	2.18	0.94
3rd	28.04	16.47	0.78	18.45	14.34	7.75	0.39	1.10	8.47
4th	36.91	16.91	14.00	7.86	3.79	5.13	4.51	2.43	2.16
5th	38.09	18.87	6.40	5.64	7.51	8.97	1.20	4.45	3.97
Total	31.38	15.30	13.55	8.73	6.90	6.37	4.57	4.15	4.03
Source: izbori.ba

==== Republika Srpska ====
Electoral Unit	SNSD	PSS	SDS	ZPR	DNS	PS - DEMOS	US
1st	38.42	19.83	8.74	7.02	4.48	4.22	4.70
2nd	41.55	12.48	16.87	3.96	4.91	6.65	3.22
3rd	44.74	9.25	15.67	5.31	7.18	3.26	4.83
Total	41.03	14.85	12.97	5.68	5.34	4.67	4.31
Source: izbori.ba

== See also ==
- 2026 Federation of Bosnia and Herzegovina general election
- 2026 Republika Srpska general election
