= Zdenko Lučić =

Bosnian Croat politician and lawyer (born 1967)

Member of the Federal House of Representatives
- In office 4 November 1998 – 27 February 2001

Personal details
- Born: 1967 (age 58–59) Ljubuški, SR Bosnia and Herzegovina, SFR Yugoslavia
- Party: Independent
- Other political affiliations: Croatian Democratic Union; Croatian True Revival (2002–2011)
- Spouse: Sandra Lučić
- Children: 3
- Education: University of Mostar (LLB)

Zdenko Lučić (born 1967) is a Bosnian Croat politician, lawyer, businessman, and former military officer. He served as a member of the Federal House of Representatives from 1998 to 2001 and was president of the Youth Organization of the Croatian Democratic Union of Bosnia and Herzegovina (HDZ BiH).

Lučić was an independent joint candidate of the Croatian Five for Croat member of the Presidency of Bosnia and Herzegovina in the 2026 general election, but was not elected.

== Early life ==
Lučić was born in Ljubuški in 1967, and completed primary school there before attending secondary school in Čitluk. He enrolled at the Faculty of Law of the University of Mostar and graduated in 1991. After graduation, he worked as a trainee lawyer in Ljubuški.

During the breakup of Yugoslavia, Lučić became involved in the organization of Croatian defense structures in Bosnia and Herzegovina and Croatia. During the Croatian War of Independence and the Bosnian War, he served with the Croatian Defence Council (HVO) and the Croatian Armed Forces, particularly in military police and security affairs.

He initially joined the Croatian Army and participated in operations involving the capture of Yugoslav People’s Army barracks in Split, Sinj, and Ploče. Following the outbreak of war in Bosnia and Herzegovina in 1992, he joined the HVO and participated in the Battle of Kupres. He later took part in the establishment of HVO security services. In 1996, he moved to Zagreb and joined the Croatian Intelligence Agency (HIS), a predecessor of the Security and Intelligence Agency.

== Academic and business career ==
In 1994, Lučić was appointed teaching assistant at the Faculty of Economics and the Faculty of Law of the University of Mostar. He published works in the fields of commercial law and international economics.

He served as director of Dubrovačka Banka d.d. Mostar and later Auro Bank d.d. Mostar in the 2000s, both associated with his brother Milan. Later, Lučić worked as a consultant on investment and business development projects in Croatia.

== Political career ==
Lučić participated in the founding of the Croatian Democratic Union of Bosnia and Herzegovina (HDZ BiH) in the early 1990s and was elected president of the party’s youth organization in 1997. In the 1998 general election, he was elected to the Federal House of Representatives. After leaving Bosnian politics in 2001, he participated in the founding of the Croatian political party Croatian True Revival (HIP) in 2002, led by Miroslav Tuđman, where Lučić served as secretary-general. The party later merged into the Croatian Democratic Union in 2011.

Lučić returned to Bosnian politics in May 2026, announcing his candidacy for the Presidency of Bosnia and Herzegovina in the October general election, running for Croat member of the presidency. Despite never formally leaving the HDZ BiH, he was a joint candidate of the Croatian Five coalition, consisting of the Croatian Democratic Union 1990, Croatian Republican Party, Croatian National Shift, Croatian Peasant Party and the Croatian Democratic Alliance. In the election, Lučić earned 22.69% of the vote and failed to get elected; HDZ BiH member Darijana Filipović won with 47.28% of the vote, while Democratic Front candidate Slaven Kovačević obtained 30.03%.

== Personal life ==
Zdenko is married to Sandra Lučić and has three children. He practiced karate from an early age and later became active in karate promotion and club development.

One of his brothers, Milan Lučić, is a businessman known for his sex tape with Croatian singer Severina in 2004. His other brother Ivica "Ivo" Lučić is a historian.

== Orders ==
Country	Decoration	Ribbon
Croatia	Order of the Croatian Trefoil	
Croatia	Homeland's Gratitude Medal	
Croatia	Order of the Croatian Interlace	
Croatia	Order of Ante Starčević	
Croatia	Homeland War Memorial Medal	
