= 2010 West Herzegovina parliamentary election =

Cantonal election in Bosnia and Herzegovina

- 3 October 2010
- All 23 seats in the Assembly of the West Herzegovina Canton; 12 seats needed for a majority
- Turnout: 56.52% (▲5.50 pp) (Note: The turnout change is the difference between the published percentages, rounded to two decimal places: 56.52% in 2010 and 51.02% in 2006.)
Party	Leader	Vote %	Seats	+/–
HDZ BiH	Zdenko Ćosić	51.42	13	+4
HDZ 1990	Ivica Gašpar	15.49	4	−4
HSP BiH	Branko Ćorluka	12.70	3	−1
NSRzB	Stipe Šakić	11.61	3	+1
This lists parties that won seats. See the complete results below.
Prime Minister before	Prime Minister after
Zdenko Ćosić; HDZ BiH	Zdenko Ćosić; HDZ BiH

The 2010 West Herzegovina parliamentary election was held on 3 October 2010 to elect all 23 members of the Assembly of the West Herzegovina Canton in West Herzegovina Canton, one of the ten cantons of the Federation of Bosnia and Herzegovina. It was part of the 2010 Bosnian general election.

The Croatian Democratic Union of Bosnia and Herzegovina (HDZ BiH) won an absolute majority with 13 of the 23 seats, four more than in 2006. HDZ 1990 won four seats, while HSP BiH and NSRzB each won three.

== Results ==
The election was contested by 16 lists. There were 35,209 valid votes and 1,815 invalid ballots. The results were certified on 2 November 2010. Vote shares are reproduced as reported and may not sum to 100%.

Final results
Party or alliance	Votes	%	Seats	Change from 2006 (Note: HDZ 1990 is compared with the 2006 Hrvatsko zajedništvo coalition (HDZ 1990–HZ–HSS–HKDU–HDU–Demokršćani), and HSP BiH with the 2006 HSP Đapić–Jurišić–NHI coalition.)
HDZ BiH	18,106	51.42	13	+4
HDZ 1990	5,455	15.49	4	−4
HSP BiH	4,471	12.70	3	−1
NSRzB	4,089	11.61	3	+1
HSP Dr. AS BiH	782	2.22	0	0
HSP Dr. AS Rightists of the 21st century	477	1.35	0	0
SP/U BiH	469	1.33	0	0
Tomislav Soldo (independent)	417	1.18	0	0
DSI	387	1.10	0	0
SDP BiH	287	0.82	0	0
HDU	227	0.64	0	0
SNBiH	12	0.03	0	0
DNZ BiH	10	0.03	0	0
Viktor Roso (independent)	10	0.03	0	0
Turnaround Coalition (GDS BiH–NEP BiH)	6	0.02	0	0
Stipe Herceg (independent)	4	0.01	0	0
Total	35,209	100.00	23	
Source: Central Election Commission of Bosnia and Herzegovina (2010 results and comparison with 2006).

Ballot totals and turnout
Ballot category	Number	% of ballots cast
Valid votes	35,209	95.10
Invalid votes, excluding blank ballots	1,040	2.81
Blank ballots	775	2.09
Total ballots cast	37,024	100.00
Registered voters	65,511	—
Turnout	56.52% (▲5.50 pp)	
Source: Central Election Commission of Bosnia and Herzegovina.

Valid votes by voting method
Voting method	Valid votes	% of valid votes
Regular	34,976	99.34
Postal	117	0.33
Absentee, mobile team and diplomatic/consular	95	0.27
Tendered	21	0.06
Total	35,209	100.00
Source: Central Election Commission of Bosnia and Herzegovina.

== Government formation ==
Zdenko Ćosić (HDZ BiH) became prime minister in September 2010, before the election. On 14 June 2011, the Assembly confirmed a new government headed by Ćosić and composed of HDZ BiH and HDZ 1990.
