= Vukota Govedarica =

Bosnian Serb politician (born 1976)

- Вукота Говедарица

Municipal Mayor of Gacko
- Incumbent
- Assumed office 28 November 2024
- Preceded by: Ognjen Milinković
Parliamentary offices
Member of the National Assembly of Republika Srpska
In office 15 November 2022 – 28 November 2024
Constituency	8th Electoral Unit
In office 9 November 2006 – 19 November 2018
Constituency	8th Electoral Unit
Additional positions
President of the Serb Democratic Party
In office 23 October 2016 – 30 June 2019
Preceded by	Mladen Bosić
Succeeded by	Mirko Šarović

Personal details
- Born: 9 March 1976 (age 50) Gacko, SR Bosnia and Herzegovina, SFR Yugoslavia
- Party: Serb Democratic Party
- Spouse: Olivera Govedarica
- Children: 2
- Education: University of Novi Sad

Vukota Govedarica (Serbian Cyrillic: Вукота Говедарица; born 9 March 1976) is a Bosnian Serb politician who has served as municipal mayor of Gacko since November 2024. He previously served as member of the National Assembly of Republika Srpska from 2006 to 2018 and from 2022 to 2024. He was president of the Serb Democratic Party (SDS) from 2016 to 2019.

Born in Gacko in 1976, Govedarica graduated from the University of Novi Sad. He was elected to the Gacko Municipal Assembly in 2004. He was then elected to the National Assembly of Republika Srpska in the 2006 general election, and served as member until November 2018. Govedarica ran for president of Republika Srpska in the 2018 general election, but was not elected after winning 41.82% of the vote. He was re-elected to the National Assembly in the 2022 general election. He was elected municipal mayor of his hometown Gacko in the 2024 municipal elections.

A member of the SDS since 1999, Govedarica was elected as the party's president in 2016. He was succeeded by Mirko Šarović in 2019.

== Early life and education ==
Govedarica was born on 9 March 1976 in Gacko, FPR Yugoslavia, present-day Bosnia and Herzegovina. He finished elementary school in Foča, and graduated from the Faculty of Sport and Physical Education at the University of Novi Sad in 2000. Upon completing his studies, Govedarica was the technical director of the Gacko Cultural and Sports Center.

== Political career ==
Govedarica joined the Serb Democratic Party (SDS) in 1999. In the 2004 municipal elections, he was elected to the Gacko Municipal Assembly. Two years later, in the 2006 general election, Govedarica was elected to the National Assembly of Republika Srpska. He managed to get re-elected to the National Assembly in the 2010 and 2014 general election.

Govedarica was appointed SDS president on 23 October 2016, following Mladen Bosić's resignation due to the party's poor performance in the 2016 municipal elections. In February 2018, the SDS announced Govedarica's candidacy for president of Republika Srpska in the October 2018 general election. However, he failed to get elected, obtaining 41.82% of the vote compared to Republika Srpska prime minister Željka Cvijanović's 47.04%. In June 2019, Govedarica was succeeded as SDS president by former Bosnian Presidency member Mirko Šarović.

In the 2024 municipal elections, Govedarica was elected municipal mayor of Gacko, securing 53.77% of the vote.

== Personal life ==
Govedarica lives in Gacko with his wife Olivera, with whom he has two children. He is also known as a frequent folk player of the gusle (traditional fiddle).
