= Nebojša Vukanović =

Bosnian Serb politician (born 1978)

- Небојша Вукановић

Member of the National Assembly of Republika Srpska
- In office 19 November 2018 – 16 November 2026
- Constituency: 9th Electoral Unit

Personal details
- Born: 10 January 1979 (age 47) Trebinje, SR Bosnia and Herzegovina, SFR Yugoslavia
- Party: For Justice and Order (2014–present)
- Spouse: Zorana Vukanović (m. 2023)
- Children: 2
- Education: University of Montenegro (BA)

Nebojša Vukanović (Serbian Cyrillic: Небојша Вукановић; born 10 January 1979) is a Bosnian Serb politician and journalist who has served as a member of the National Assembly of Republika Srpska since November 2018. He is the founder and president of the political party For Justice and Order.

== Early life and education ==
Vukanović was born in Trebinje on 10 January 1979. He completed his elementary and high school education in his hometown before pursuing higher education at the University of Montenegro in Nikšić. There, he graduated in 2005 with a degree in history and geography from the Faculty of Philosophy.

After graduation, Vukanović began his professional career as a professor at an elementary school in Trebinje and journalist. From 2007 to 2008, he worked at the national broadcaster RTRS, and later moved to BN TV, where he worked until 2014.

== Political career ==
Vukanović gained public recognition as an outspoken critic of Milorad Dodik and his Alliance of Independent Social Democrats (SNSD) in 2006. His political career began when he ran for mayor of Trebinje in the 2012 municipal elections. Although he garnered significant support, obtaining 27.56% of the vote, he was not elected.

In 2014, Vukanović founded the party For Justice and Order, a move that positioned him as a prominent voice of opposition in Republika Srpska. From 2014 to 2018, he worked as an advisor to Mladen Bosić, chair of the House of Representatives of Bosnia and Herzegovina. Vukanović was elected to the National Assembly of Republika Srpska in the 2018 general election. He was re-elected in the 2022 general election, securing over 5,000 votes.

In January 2025, the liberal alliance Troika announced that it was rescinding its support for the national coalition with the SNSD, following the latter failing to vote for two laws concentrated on European Union accession. The legislation was ultimately passed with votes from the SNSD's opposition in Republika Srpska, including a vote from Vukanović's party. Since then, chairwoman of the Council of Ministers, Borjana Krišto, has been accused of intentionally ignoring the Troika-backed appointment of Vukanović as the new minister of security following the office's vacancy in January 2025.

In October 2025, he claimed that Milorad Dodik is an agent of Croatia's intelligence service and criticised high-ranking SNSD politicians Željka Cvijanović and Siniša Karan for their half-Croat ethnic background. In May 2026, Vukanović declared he was running for Serb member of the Presidency of Bosnia and Herzegovina in the October 2026 general election. In the election, he earned 18.02% of the vote and failed to get elected; the incumbent Željka Cvijanović won with 55.58% of the vote, while Serb Democratic Party candidate Marinko Božović obtained 26.40%.

== Personal life ==
In addition to his political career, Vukanović has, since 2011, maintained a personal blog and a YouTube channel, the latter of which has over 100,000 subscribers.

On 4 September 2021, he was physically attacked in Cetinje by a group of Montenegrin nationalists. He was again attacked in July 2023 at a restaurant near Foča. Most recently, on the night of 13 March 2025, his car was set on fire in front of his home, an act he attributed to Milorad Dodik, whom he has long criticized.

Vukanović has been married to Zorana Vukanović since 2023, and they reside in Trebinje. On 29 October 2026, she gave birth to their twins, Nevena and Vukan.
