= 9th electoral unit of the National Assembly of Republika Srpska =

Parliamentary constituency

9th electoral unit
- National Assembly of Republika Srpska constituency
- Electoral unit within Republika Srpska

Current constituency
- Created: 2002
- Seats: 7

The ninth electoral unit of Republika Srpska is a parliamentary constituency used to elect members to the National Assembly of Republika Srpska since 2002. Prior to 2014, it was called the sixth electoral unit. It consists of the Municipalities of Nevesinje, Kalinovik, Gacko, Foča, Novo Goražde, Čajniče, Rudo, Berkovići, Ljubinje, Bileća, Trebinje, Višegrad and Istočni Mostar.

== Demographics ==
Ethnicity	Population	%
Bosniaks	7,562	6.6
Croats	504	0.4
Serbs	105,274	91.7
Did Not declare	316	0.3
Others	881	0.8
Unknown	261	0.2
Total	114,798	

== Representatives ==
Convocation	Deputies						
2002–2006	Dobroslav Ćuk (SNSD)	Mirjana Košarac (SDS)	Slobodan Prtilo (SDS)	Vlado Kovačević (SDS)	Ranko Savić (PDP)	Slavko Boljanović (SRS RS)	Omer Branković (SDA)
2006–2010	Perica Rajčević (SNSD)	Svetislav Kovačević (SNSD)	Slobodan Prtilo (SDS)	Radovan Vuković (SNSD)	Ranko Savić (PDP)	Goran Lončarević (SNSD)	Vukota Govedarica (SDS)
2010–2014	Ilija Tamindžija (SNSD)	Veljko Marić (SNSD)	Saša Bošković (SNSD)	Miroslav Kojić (SDS)	Slavko Vučurević (PDP)	Slavko Boljanović (SRS RS)	Vukota Govedarica (SDS)
2014–2018	Ilija Tamindžija (SNSD)	Luka Petrović (SNSD)	Srđan Milović (SNSD)	Miroslav Kojić (SDS)	Slavko Vučurević (PDP)	Branko Butulija (SDS)	Zdravko Krsmanović (SP)
2018–2022	Ilija Tamindžija (SNSD)	Luka Petrović (SNSD)	Pero Petrović (SNSD)	Nebojša Vukanović (SDS/ ZPR)	Spomenko Stojanović (DNS)	Branko Butulija (SDS)	Maksim Skoko (SP)
2022–2026	Ilija Tamindžija (SNSD)	Luka Petrović (SNSD)	Nenad Lalović (SNSD)	Nebojša Vukanović (SDS/ ZPR)	Vukota Govedarica (SDS)	Ognjen Bodiroga (SDS)	Ognjen Kuljić (SP)
