= Ivo Miro Jović =

Bosnian Croat politician (born 1950)

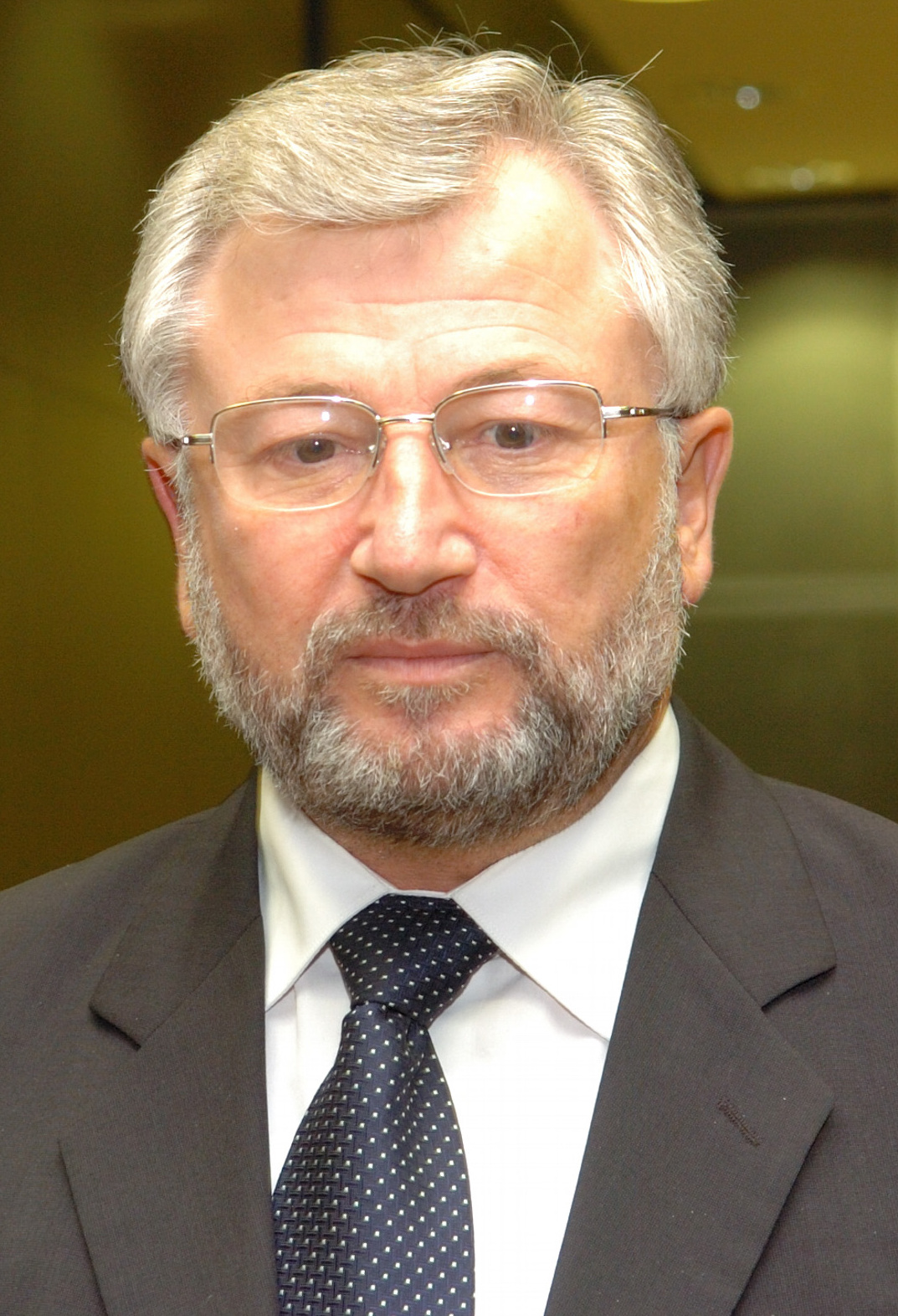
- Jović in 2005

Chairman of the Presidency of Bosnia and Herzegovina
- In office 28 June 2005 – 28 February 2006
- Preceded by: Borislav Paravac
- Succeeded by: Sulejman Tihić

Croat member of the Presidency of Bosnia and Herzegovina
- In office 9 May 2005 – 6 November 2006
- Prime Minister: Adnan Terzić
- Preceded by: Dragan Čović
- Succeeded by: Željko Komšić
Parliamentary offices
Member of the House of Peoples
In office
14 March 2007 – 9 June 2011
Member of the House of Representatives
In office
9 December 2002 – 9 May 2005

Personal details
- Born: 15 July 1950 (age 76) Čapljina, PR Bosnia and Herzegovina, FPR Yugoslavia
- Party: Croatian Democratic Union (1990–present)
- Spouse: Lucija Jović
- Children: 3
- Education: University of Sarajevo (BA); University of Rijeka (MEc)
- Awards: Order of Pope Pius IX (2008)

Ivo Miro Jović (born 15 July 1950) is a Bosnian Croat former politician who served as the Croat member of the Presidency of Bosnia and Herzegovina from 2005 to 2006.

He was a member of both the national House of Peoples and House of Representatives. Jović has been a member of the Croatian Democratic Union since 1990.

== Early career ==
After Jović had graduated as a history teacher from the University of Sarajevo in 1975, he worked as a teacher in Ilijaš, Kiseljak, Kreševo and Fojnica. He became active in politics in 1997, as the Croatian Democratic Union (HDZ BiH) had proposed him for a government position in the Central Bosnia Canton. In 1999, Jović entered the Federal Government as Deputy Minister of Culture, where he remained until 2001. Following the 2002 general election, he was elected as a representative for his party in the national House of Representatives. In 2010, he received a Master's Degree from the Paneuropean University Apeiron in Banja Luka.

== Presidency (2005–2006) ==
On 9 May 2005, Jović was appointed to the post of member of the Presidency of Bosnia and Herzegovina by Parliament, following the sacking of Dragan Čović by the High Representative for Bosnia and Herzegovina on charges of corruption. As a member of the Presidency, he attended the 2005 World Summit in New York City from 14 to 16 September.

In the 2006 general election, Jović was defeated in the race for a second term as the Croat member of the Presidency by Željko Komšić of the Social Democratic Party (SDP BiH). Komšić's victory was widely attributed to a split in the HDZ BiH, enabling the SDP BiH to win a majority of the Bosniaks votes. Komšić was seen by the Croats as their illegitimate representative because he was elected mostly by Bosniak voters.

While serving in the Presidency, Jović was also as its chairman for most of his term.

== Later career ==
Following his presidency, Jović served as the Croat and HDZ BiH's representative in the national House of Peoples from 14 March 2007 until 9 June 2011.

In 2013, he was appointed as an advisor to then Deputy Defence Minister Marina Pendeš. In 2015, she was charged by the State Prosecutor's Office for paying Jović a salary despite his not showing up to work. In February 2016, she was acquitted by the Court of Bosnia and Herzegovina of the charges.

== Personal life ==
Jović is fluent in German, married and father of three children.
