= 8th electoral unit of the National Assembly of Republika Srpska =

Parliamentary constituency

8th electoral unit
- National Assembly of Republika Srpska constituency
- Electoral unit within Republika Srpska

Current constituency
- Created: 2014
- Seats: 4

The eighth electoral unit of Republika Srpska is a parliamentary constituency used to elect members to the National Assembly of Republika Srpska since 2014. It consists of the Municipalities of Sokolac, Han Pijesak, Istočna Ilidža, Istočni Stari Grad, Istočno Novo Sarajevo, Trnovo, Pale and Rogatica.

== Demographics ==
| Ethnicity | Population | % |
|---|---|---|
| Bosniaks | 3,977 | 5.2 |
| Croats | 468 | 0.6 |
| Serbs | 70,548 | 93.1 |
| Did Not declare | 253 | 0.3 |
| Others | 467 | 0.6 |
| Unknown | 56 | 0.1 |
| Total | 75,769 | |

== Representatives ==
| Convocation | Deputies | | | |
|---|---|---|---|---|
| 2014–2018 | Marko Vidaković (SNSD) | Milorad Jagodić (SNSD) | Marinko Božović (SDS) | Milovan Bjelica (SDS) |
| 2018–2022 | Miroslav Vujičić (SNSD) | Nataša Trifković (SNSD) | Darko Babalj (SDS) | Aleksandar Glavaš (DNS) |
| 2022–2026 | Damjan Škipina (SNSD) | Ljubiša Ćosić (SNSD) | Marinko Božović (SDS) | Aco Stanišić (DEMOS /SNSD) |
| 2026-2030 | Jovan Katić (SNSD) | Dejan Kojić (PSS) | Bojo Gašanović (SDS) | Aco Stanišić (DEMOS /SNSD) |
