= Central Election Commission of Bosnia and Herzegovina =

- Centralna izborna komisija Bosne i Hercegovine / Централнa изборнa комисијa Боснe и Херцеговинe; Središnje izborno povjerenstvo Bosne i Hercegovine
- Coat of arms of Bosnia and Herzegovina
- Abbreviation: CECBiH (CIK / SIP BiH)
- Predecessor: Provisional Election Commission (PEC)
- Established: 28 September 2001; 25 years ago
- Type: Election commission
- Purpose: Regulating and supervising the election process in Bosnia and Herzegovina
- Headquarters: Danijela Ozme 7
- Location: Sarajevo, Bosnia and Herzegovina
- Coordinates: 43.86°N 18.41°E
- Region served: Bosnia and Herzegovina
- Official languages: Bosnian, Serbian, Croatian
- First President: Lidija Korać
- Current President: Jovan Kalaba
- Main organ: Parliamentary Assembly of Bosnia and Herzegovina
- Budget: 17.380.000 BAM (est. $10.767.221) (2021)
- Website: izbori.ba
- Formerly called: Election Commission of Bosnia and Herzegovina

The Central Election Commission of Bosnia and Herzegovina (CEC BiH; Bosnian: Centralna izborna komisija Bosne i Hercegovine - CIK BiH, Croatian: Središnje izborno povjerenstvo - SIP BiH, Serbian: Централнa изборнa комисијa Боснe и Херцеговинe - ЦИК БиХ / Centralna izborna komisija Bosne i Hercegovine - CIK BiH) is the administrative body responsible for regulating and supervising the election process in Bosnia and Herzegovina. The CEC also oversees the work of local and regional election commissions, which regulate the electoral process in lower administrative units.

== History ==
=== Establishment ===
The Provisional Election Commission (PEC) ceased to exist after the Parliamentary Assembly of Bosnia and Herzegovina adopted the Election Law of Bosnia and Herzegovina at a session of the House of Representatives held on 21 August 2001, and at a session of the House of Peoples held on 23 August 2001. The Election Commission of Bosnia and Herzegovina was thus established, assuming the previous tasks carried out by the PEC.

On 16 November 2001, the High Representative appointed members of the Election Commission from the list proposed by the Provisional Commission for Appointments which consisted of members of the Commission for Electing and Appointing Judges of the Court of Bosnia and Herzegovina and international members of the Election Commission.

The following persons were appointed as members of the Election Commission: Branko Petrić, representative of the Serbs, Lidija Korać, representative of the Croats people, Hilmo Pašić, representative of the Bosniaks, Vehid Šehić, representative of the Others and Robert S. Beecroft, Gerhard Enver Schrönbergs and Ambassador Victor Tkachenko, representatives of the International community.

=== First and second sessions ===
The constitutional first session of the Election Commission was held on 20 November 2001, and thus the Provisional Election Commission officially ceased to exist. A decision on establishing the Secretariat of the Election Commission was passed at the same session. The Secretariat conducts professional and administrative-technical duties for the Election Commission, the Complaints and Appeals Council and the Appellative Council.

At the second session of the Election Commission held on 27 November 2001, Lidija Korać was elected its first president. The Election Commission of Bosnia and Herzegovina adopted its Rules of Procedure at the same session.

=== Rotation procedure ===
At 46th session of the Election Commission held on 27 February 2003, a rotation procedure on the office of president of this institution was made. Hilmo Pašić was elected second president and Vehid Šehić was elected third president. Since 1 January 2024, Irena Hadžiabdić has served as president of the Central Election Commission of Bosnia and Herzegovina.

Pursuant to Article 2.6 of the Election Law of Bosnia and Herzegovina, the President of the Central Election Commission is appointed from amongst its members. Each member of the Central Election Commission, a Croat, a Bosniak, a Serb and a representative of the Others, shall perform the duty of the president of the Central Election Commission according to the rotation principle, once in seven (7) years for the period of twenty-one (21) months.

The Election Commission of Bosnia and Herzegovina changed its name to the Central Election Commission of Bosnia and Herzegovina in April 2006.

== Members ==
The current members of the Central Election Commission of Bosnia and Herzegovina are:

- Irena Hadžiabdić, president
- Vlado Rogić, member
- Ahmet Šantić, member
- Jovan Kalaba, member
- Vanja Bjelica-Prutina, member
- Željko Bakalar, member
- Suad Arnautović, member

== List of presidents ==
At the 46th session of the Election Commission of Bosnia and Herzegovina, held on 27 February 2003, the rotation procedure on the office of president of this institution was made.

Name	Mandate
Lidija Korać	27 November 2001 – 27 February 2003
Hilmo Pašić	27 February 2003 – 20 May 2004
Vehid Šehić	20 May 2004 – 18 August 2005
Branko Petrić	18 August 2005 – 16 November 2006
Stjepan Mikić	16 November 2006 – 15 February 2008
Suad Arnautović	15 February 2008 – 8 May 2009
Irena Hadžiabdić	8 May 2009 – 29 September 2011
Branko Petrić	29 September 2011 – 26 June 2013
Stjepan Mikić	26 June 2013 – 31 March 2015
Ahmet Šantić	31 March 2015 – 1 January 2017
Irena Hadžiabdić	1 January 2017 – 31 September 2018
Branko Petrić	1 October 2018 – 11 May 2020
Vanja Bjelica-Prutina	16 May 2020 – 31 June 2020
Željko Bakalar	1 July 2020 – 29 March 2022
Suad Arnautović	30 March 2022 – 31 December 2024
Irena Hadžiabdić	1 January 2024 – 1 October 2025
Jovan Kalaba	1 October 2025 – Incumbent

== See also ==
- Politics of Bosnia and Herzegovina
- Elections in Bosnia and Herzegovina
  - Elections in Republika Srpska
