= Croatian Democratic Alliance (Bosnia and Herzegovina) =

Croatian Democratic Alliance Hrvatski demokratski savez
- Abbreviation: HDS
- President: Ivo Tadić
- Founder: Ivo Tadić
- Founded: 11 February 2024; 2 years ago
- Split from: Croatian Democratic Union of Bosnia and Herzegovina
- Headquarters: Stjepana Tomaševića bb Žepče
- Ideology: Regionalism; Croatian nationalism
- Political position: Centre-right
- National affiliation: Croatian Five
- Colours: Red; Blue
- Slogan: Snažno i odlučno! (Strong and determined!)
- HoR BiH: 0 / 42
- HoP BiH: 0 / 15
- HoR FBiH: 0 / 98
- HoP FBiH: 1 / 80

Website
- hdsbih.org

The Croatian Democratic Alliance (Croatian: Hrvatski demokratski savez, HDS) is a minor Croat political party in Bosnia and Herzegovina.

== History ==
HDS was founded on 11 February 2024 by Ivo Tadić, member of the Assembly of the Zenica-Doboj Canton and the House of Peoples of the Federation of Bosnia and Herzegovina, and former member of the Croatian Democratic Union of Bosnia and Herzegovina (HDZ BiH). HDS was founded and is the only political party headquartered in Žepče.

HDS was formed as opposition to HDZ BiH cooperating with other Bosnian Croat opposition parties like HDZ 1990, HNP, HRS and HSS BiH.

HDS is mostly focused on Žepče and the Zenica-Doboj Canton. The party participated in the 2024 municipal elections in Žepče, Vareš and Maglaj.

== Election results ==
=== Parliamentary Assembly of Bosnia and Herzegovina ===
Parliamentary Assembly of Bosnia and Herzegovina
Year	#	Popular vote	%	HoR	Seat change	HoP	Seat change	Government
2026 (Note: Run as part of Croatian Five, which won a single seat that went to HDZ 1990.)	10th	36,637	2.71	0 / 42	New	0 / 15	New	Extra-parliamentary
