= Darko Babalj =

Bosnian Serb politician (born 1974)

- Дарко Бабаљ
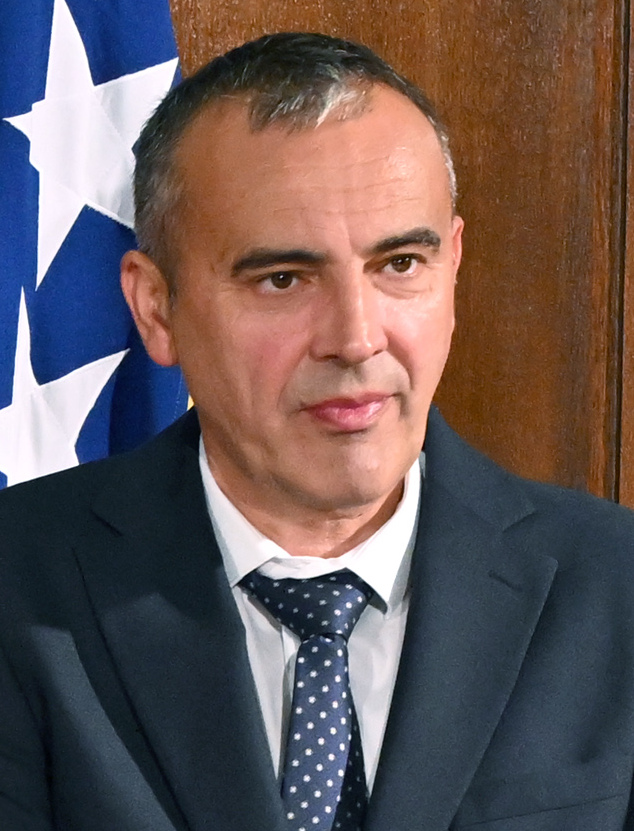
- Babalj in 2025

Member of the House of Representatives
- Incumbent
- Assumed office 1 December 2022
- Constituency: 3rd Electoral Unit
- In office 30 November 2010 – 9 December 2014
- Constituency: 3rd Electoral Unit
Parliamentary offices
Member of the National Assembly of Republika Srpska
In office 19 November 2018 – 15 November 2022
Constituency	8th Electoral Unit
Member of the House of Peoples
In office 16 February 2015 – 28 February 2019

Personal details
- Born: 12 December 1974 (age 51) Sarajevo, SR Bosnia and Herzegovina, SFR Yugoslavia
- Party: Serb Democratic Party (1991–present)
- Spouse: Ana Babalj
- Children: 2

Darko Babalj (born 12 December 1974) is a Bosnian Serb politician serving as member of the national House of Representatives since December 2022, having previously served from 2010 to 2014. He also served as member of the National Assembly of Republika Srpska from 2018 to 2022.

A member of the Serb Democratic Party, Babalj was a delegate in the House of Peoples from 2015 to 2019. He was most recently elected to the House of Representatives in the 2022 general election.

== Early life and education ==
Born in Sarajevo on 12 December 1974, Babalj completed his primary and secondary education before earning a degree from the Higher School of Sports Management in Belgrade in 2001. In 2007, he graduated from the Faculty of Service Business in Novi Sad.

Babalj participated in the Bosnian War (1992–1995). After the war, he worked as the director of the Vizantija Gallery in Istočno Sarajevo until 2004.

== Political career ==
Babalj has been a member of the Serb Democratic Party since 1991, joining at just 17 years old. Currently, he also serves on the party's Main Board. Following the 2004 municipal elections, he became deputy mayor of Istočna Ilidža, and after the 2008 elections, he was elected president of the Assembly of the City of Istočno Sarajevo.

In the 2010 general election, Babalj was elected to the House of Representatives of Bosnia and Herzegovina for the 3rd Electoral Unit of RS, but after failing to secure re-election in 2014, he was delegated to the national House of Peoples. In the 2018 general election, he won a seat in the National Assembly of Republika Srpska, and in 2022, he returned to the House of Representatives.

In January 2025, upon the initiative of Our Party member Sabina Ćudić, Nebojša Radmanović was removed from the House of Representatives collegium. As his replacement, the liberal alliance Troika reached an agreement with the opposition parties from Republika Srpska to appoint Babalj as the new member of the collegium in February 2025.

== Personal life ==
Babalj lives with his wife Ana in Istočno Sarajevo, with whom he has two children. He is also known to be an avid art collector.
