= Social Democrats (Bosnia and Herzegovina) =

Social Democrats Socijaldemokrate Социјалдемократе
- President: Husein Tokić
- Founder: Enver Bijedić
- Founded: 7 September 2019
- Split from: Social Democratic Party
- Headquarters: Turalibegova 22/1, Tuzla
- Ideology: Social democracy; Pro-Europeanism
- Political position: Centre-left
- HoR BiH: 0 / 42
- HoP BiH: 0 / 15
- HoR FBiH: 0 / 98
- HoP FBiH: 1 / 80
- NA RS: 0 / 83
- NA BD: 0 / 35

Website
- sdbih.ba

The Social Democrats of Bosnia and Herzegovina (Bosnian: Socijaldemokrate Bosne i Hercegovine (SD BiH) / Социјалдемократе Босне и Херцеговине) is a social-democratic political party in Bosnia and Herzegovina.

== History ==
The Social Democrats of Bosnia and Herzegovina (SD BiH) were formed in Tuzla, Bosnia and Herzegovina on 7 September 2019. The party was formed after disagreements within the membership of the Social Democratic Party. Founder Enver Bijedić was chosen as president of the SD BiH.

The party currently has two seats in the Tuzla Cantonal Assembly. In September 2023, Bijedić decided to leave the party after months of intra-party conflicts, which culminated in him getting succeeded as president.

== Ideology ==
Much like the Social Democratic Party, the Social Democrats are a left-wing democratic party. The program vision corresponds to values and ideas of social democracy in Europe and the world. The SD BiH is a civic party that is particularly interested in improving the social status of workers, rural population, students, youth, veterans, women, pensioners and citizens of Bosnia and Herzegovina in the diaspora.

== List of presidents ==
#	Name (Born–Died)	Portrait	Term of Office	
1	Enver Bijedić (b. 1961)		7 September 2019	3 September 2023
2	Husein Tokić (b. 1977)		3 September 2023	present

== Election results ==
=== Parliamentary elections ===
Parliamentary Assembly of Bosnia and Herzegovina
Year	#	Popular vote	%	HoR	Seat change	HoP	Seat change	Government
2022	23rd	11,831	0.75	0 / 42	New	0 / 15	New	Extra-parliamentary
2026 (Note: Run in coalition with NiP, which won both seats obtained by the coalition.)	8th	58,837	4.35	0 / 42	0	0 / 15	0	Extra-parliamentary

=== Cantonal elections ===
Cantonal election	Cantonal Assembly										
Cantonal election	Una-Sana	Posavina	Tuzla	Zenica-Doboj	Bosnian Podrinje Goražde	Central Bosnia	Herzegovina-Neretva	West Herzegovina	Sarajevo	Canton 10	Total won / Total contested
2022	0 / 30	0 / 21	2 / 35	0 / 35	0 / 25	0 / 30	0 / 30	0 / 23	0 / 35	0 / 25	2 / 289
