= Denis Bećirović =

Bosnian politician (born 1975)

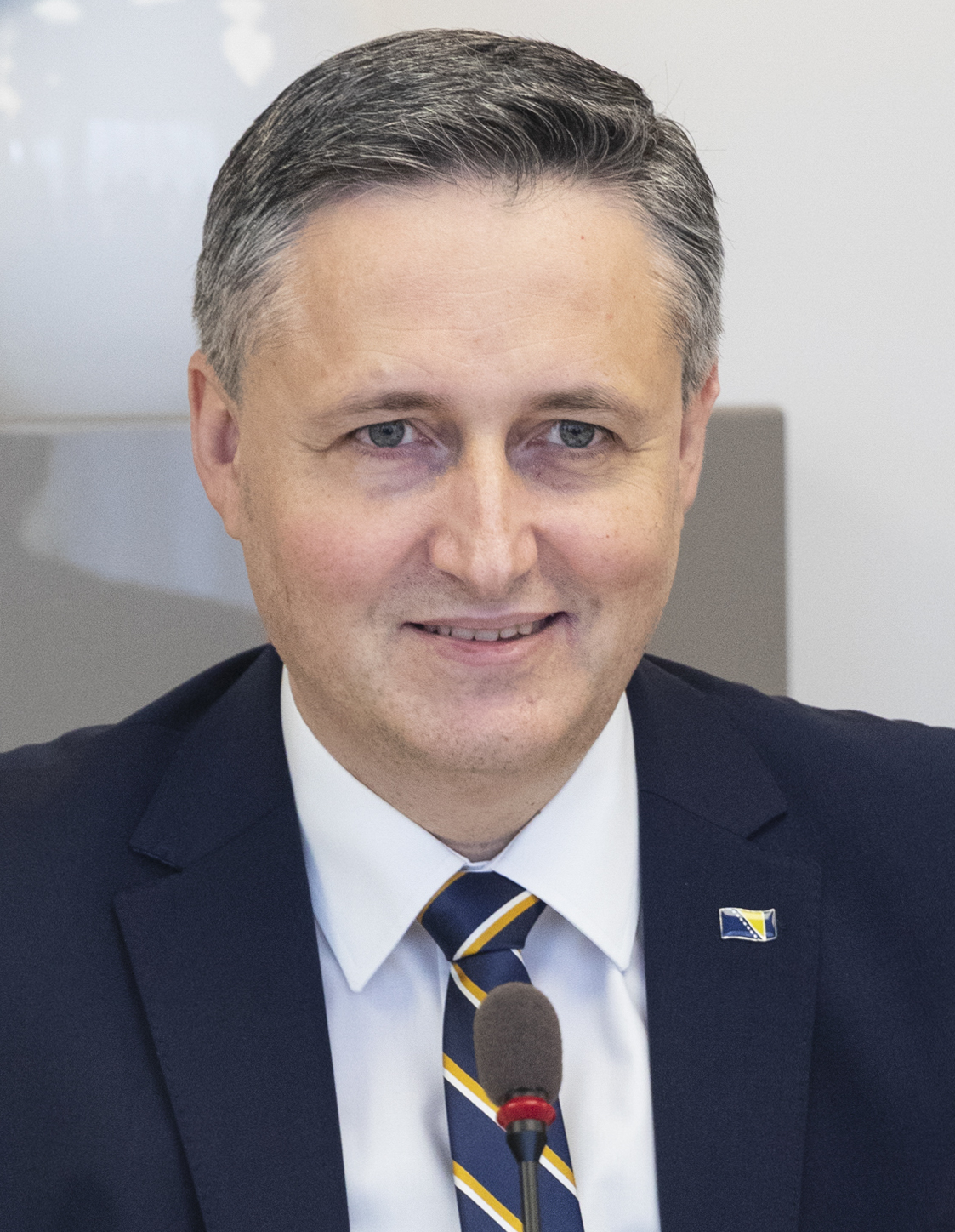
- Bećirović in 2026

Bosniak member of the Presidency of Bosnia and Herzegovina
- Incumbent
- Assumed office 16 November 2022 (Note: Serving as the Chairman of the Presidency from 16 March 2024 to 16 November 2024, and from 16 March 2026 to 16 November 2026.)
- Prime Minister: Zoran Tegeltija; Borjana Krišto
- Preceded by: Šefik Džaferović
Parliamentary offices
Member of the House of Peoples
In office 28 February 2019 – 16 November 2022
Member of the House of Representatives
In office 20 November 2006 – 6 December 2018
Constituency	5th Electoral Unit

Personal details
- Born: 28 November 1975 (age 50) Tuzla, SR Bosnia and Herzegovina, SFR Yugoslavia
- Party: Social Democratic Party (1993–present)
- Spouse: Mirela Bećirović
- Children: 2
- Education: University of Tuzla (BA); University of Sarajevo (MA, PhD)

Denis Bećirović (born 28 November 1975) is a Bosnian politician, professor and historian who has served as the Bosniak member of the Presidency of Bosnia and Herzegovina since 2022. Previously, Bećirović was a member of the national House of Peoples from 2019 to 2022. He is a member and former vice-president of the Social Democratic Party (SDP BiH).

Born in Tuzla, Bećirović graduated from the city's University in 1998. He enrolled in postgraduate studies at the Faculty of Humanities at the University of Sarajevo in 2000. Prior to his political engagement, Bećirović was a history teacher at a primary school in Tuzla. From 1998 to 2002, he worked at the Secondary School of Economics in his hometown.

Bećirović has been a member of the SDP BiH since 1993. In 1998, he became a member of the Federal Parliament. Two years later, he entered the Tuzla Cantonal Assembly and was appointed member of the Federal House of Peoples. In the 2006 general election, Bećirović was elected to the national House of Representatives. In the 2018 general election, he ran as the SDP BiH's candidate for a seat in the Presidency of Bosnia and Herzegovina as a Bosniak member, but was not elected. Following the general election, he became a member of the national House of Peoples.

In the 2022 general election, Bećirović ran once again for a seat in the Presidency as a Bosniak member and was elected, defeating former Presidency member Bakir Izetbegović. Bećirović was sworn in as Presidency member in November 2022. He was re-elected to a second term in the 2026 election.

== Early life and education ==
Bećirović was born on 28 November 1975 in Tuzla, where he was raised by his parents, Sead and Jasminka Bećirović.

He graduated in 1998 with a bachelor's degree in history and geography from the Faculty of Humanities at the University of Tuzla. In 2000, he began postgraduate studies in history at the University of Sarajevo, earning a master's degree in 2004 and a doctorate in 2010. Since 2010, Bećirović has been a member of the academic staff at the University of Tuzla, specializing in contemporary history. He was appointed assistant professor in 2010 and promoted to associate professor in 2017.

== Political career ==
Bećirović joined the Social Democratic Party in 1993 and has held several positions within the party. Prior to his political engagement, Bećirović was a history teacher at a primary school in his hometown of Tuzla, and from 1998 to 2002, he worked at the Secondary School of Economics in his hometown. He has been an assistant professor at the Faculty of Humanities in Tuzla since 2010. In 1998, Bećirović became a member of the Federal Parliament. Two years later, in the 2000 parliamentary election, he entered the Tuzla Cantonal Assembly and the Federal House of Peoples.

In the 2002 general election, Bećirović was re-elected to the Cantonal Assembly, and four years later, in the 2006 general election, he became a member of the national House of Representatives. He renewed his term in the 2010 general election as well. In the 2014 general election, Bećirović won his third consecutive term in the national Parliament.

In the 2018 general election, Bećirović ran for a seat in the Presidency of Bosnia and Herzegovina as a Bosniak member, but was not elected, obtaining 33.53% of the vote, with Šefik Džaferović of the Party of Democratic Action getting elected with 36.61% of the vote. In February 2019, following the election, Bećirović was appointed member of the national House of Peoples.

== Presidency (2022–present) ==
=== 2022 general election ===
The three-party liberal coalition of the Social Democratic Party, the People and Justice party and Our Party, known as Troika, additionally supported by the Union for a Better Future and the People's European Union (NES), announced Bećirović's candidacy in the Bosnian general election on 21 May 2022, running once more for Presidency member and representing the Bosniaks.

In the general election, held on 2 October 2022, he was elected to the Presidency, having obtained 57.37% of the vote. The Party of Democratic Action candidate and former Bosniak Presidency member, Bakir Izetbegović, was second with 37.25%.

=== 2026 general election ===
In January 2026, Bećirović announced his bid for re-election in the October 2026 general election. As in 2022, he was backed by an alliance consisting of 14 parties, including Troika, the NES, and other minor parties. On 4 October, Bećirović was re-elected to a second four-year term, defeating Bakir Izetbegović for a second time, as well as Semir Efendić and Fahrudin Radončić. However, Bećirović won with a far smaller margin as opposed to the 2022 election, winning 38.10% of the vote; Izetbegović received 34.14%, Efendić earned 25.61%, while Radončić got just 2.15% of the total vote share.

=== Domestic policy ===
Bećirović was sworn in as Presidency member on 16 November 2022, alongside newly elected member Željka Cvijanović and re-elected member Željko Komšić.

Following the 2022 general election, a coalition led by the Alliance of Independent Social Democrats, the Croatian Democratic Union and Troika reached an agreement on the formation of a new government, designating Borjana Krišto as the new Chairwoman of the Council of Ministers. The Presidency officially nominated Krišto as chairwoman-designate on 22 December; Bećirović and Cvijanović voted for, while Komšić voted against. Bećirović said after the vote that "It's time to give a chance to development, cooperation and dialogue in Bosnia and Herzegovina" and that the "Citizens and peoples of Bosnia must no longer be held hostages of permanent blockades, blackmails and quarrels."

On 27 June 2023, the National Assembly of Republika Srpska voted to suspend rulings by the Constitutional Court of Bosnia and Herzegovina and stopping publishing the High Representative's decrees and laws in the official gazette. Bećirović later called on the High Representative to sanction Republika Srpska president Milorad Dodik and his allies for derogating the peace agreement.

=== Foreign policy ===
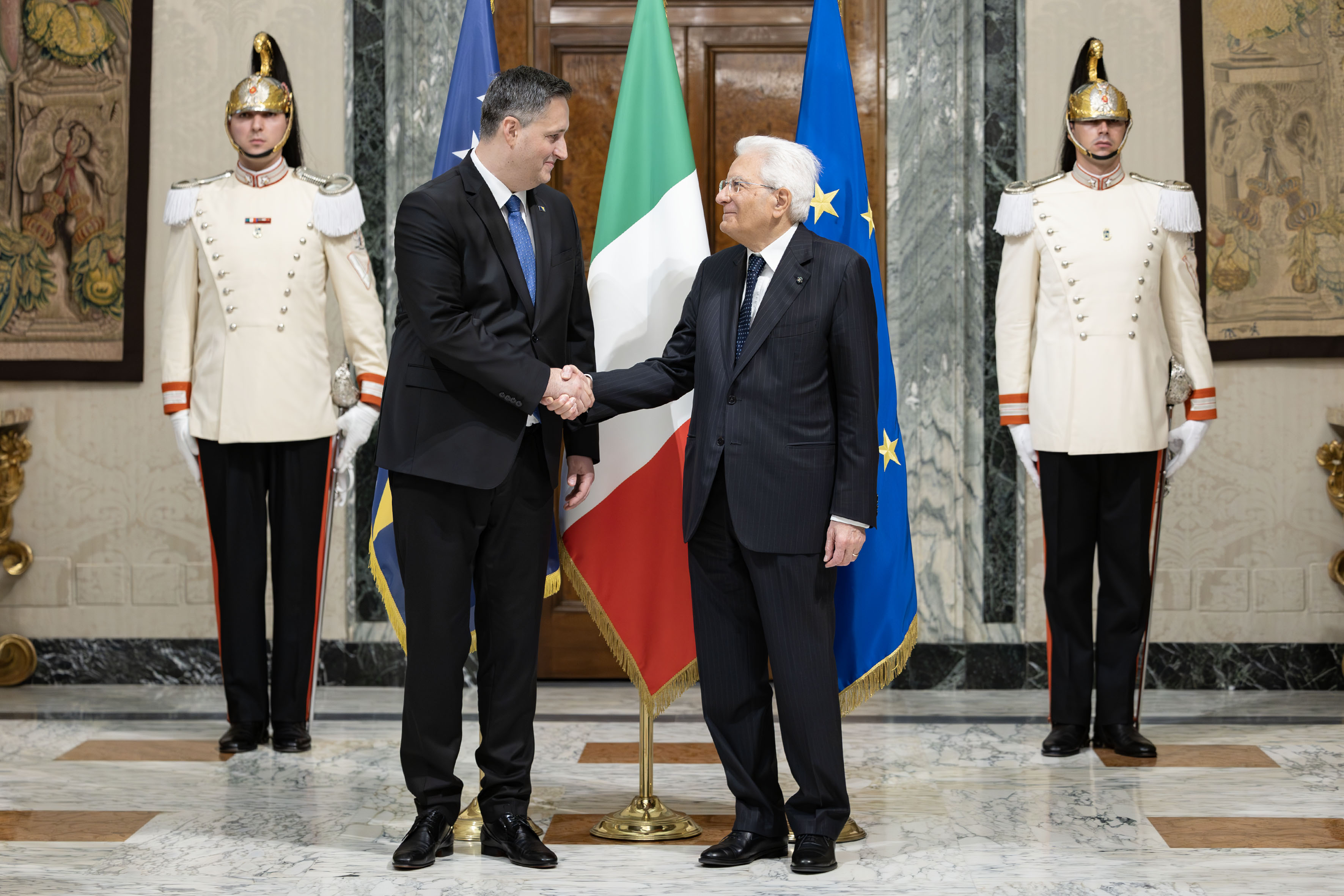
Bećirović greeting Italian President Sergio Mattarella, 2 July 2024

On 4 July 2023, Bećirović met with British prime minister Rishi Sunak during an official visit to the United Kingdom. They discussed bilateral relations between Bosnia and Herzegovina and the United Kingdom, implementing economic reforms, strengthening democracy and reforming the rule of law. In October 2023, he met with Pope Francis in Vatican City.

Following the United Nations General Assembly designating July 11 as the annual International Day of Reflection and Commemoration of the 1995 Genocide in Srebrenica in May 2024, Bećirović bolstered up the decision, declaring that truth and justice had won. Remarks made by Bećirović during the July commemoration prompted a response from Serbia. The Serbian Ministry of Foreign Affairs accused him of using the commemoration for political purposes and said that his remarks did not contribute to reconciliation.

In September 2024, Bećirović met with U.S. president Joe Biden in New York during the United Nations General Assembly session, where they discussed bilateral relations between Bosnia and Herzegovina and the United States, as well as continued U.S. support for Bosnia and Herzegovina's sovereignty, territorial integrity, and Euro-Atlantic integration.

In October 2025, following the brokering of the Gaza peace plan and the start of a third ceasefire in the Gaza war, the Bosnian Presidency unanimously decided to nominate U.S. president Donald Trump for the Nobel Peace Prize for his "commitment to establishing lasting peace in Gaza" and the Middle East. This marked the first official nomination for the 2026 edition of the award.

==== European Union ====
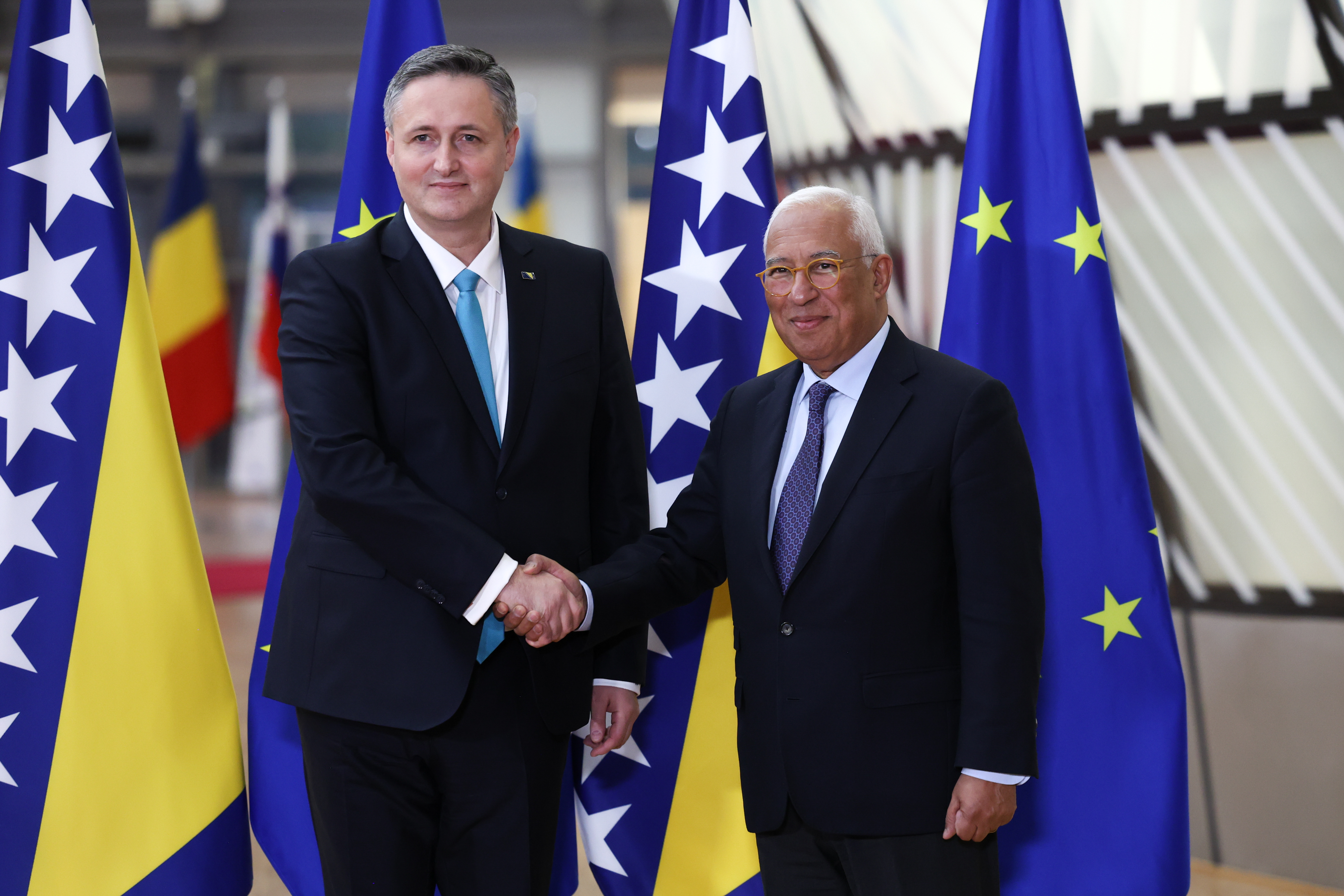
Bećirović with European Council President António Costa, 16 March 2026

Bećirović has consistently advocated Bosnia and Herzegovina's accession to the European Union, describing EU membership as the country's strategic goal and the best framework for long-term stability and prosperity. He has repeatedly emphasized that membership in the European Union represents the country's primary foreign-policy objective and a key guarantee of long-term peace, stability, and economic development.

On 15 December 2022, Bosnia and Herzegovina was recognised by the European Union as a candidate country for accession following the decision of the European Council, which Bećirović welcomed as an important milestone in the country's European integration process. He subsequently supported efforts aimed at fulfilling the priorities identified by the European Commission for opening accession negotiations.

On 8 February 2024, the Presidency unanimously adopted the decision to start negotiations with Frontex, one of the country’s key conditions for opening negotiations with the EU. On 21 March 2024, at a summit in Brussels, all 27 EU leaders, representing the European Council, unanimously agreed to open EU accession talks with Bosnia and Herzegovina after the Council of Ministers adopted two more European laws. Talks are set to begin following the impeding of more reforms.

In June 2026, at an EU-Western Balkans Leaders summit, Bećirović noted that Europe was experiencing "one of the most complex and challenging periods in its modern history. We are witnessing the destabilization of the global order, geopolitical upheavals, wars, hybrid threats, and growing instability. Strengthening ties between the European Union and the countries of the Western Balkans is now more important than ever."

== Personal life ==
Denis is married to Mirela Bećirović, and together they have two children.

== Works ==
Bećirović has written several books and papers dealing with the modern history of Bosnia and Herzegovina. Some of his work include:

- Bećirović, Denis (2012). Informbiro i sjeveroistočna Bosna: odjeci i posljedice sukoba KPJ-Informbiro 1948.-1953 [Informbiro and the North East Bosnia: echoes and consequences of the KPJ-Informbiro conflict 1948-1953] (in Bosnian). Sarajevo: Feri. ISBN 9789958933776.
- Bećirović, Denis (2012). Islamska Zajednica u Bosni i Hercegovini za vrijeme avnojske Jugoslavije (1945-1953) [The Islamic Community in Bosnia and Herzegovina during the AVNOJ Yugoslavia (1945-1953)] (in Bosnian). Sarajevo: Bošnjačka nacionalna zajednica. ISBN 9789535526483.
- Bećirović, Denis (2021). Teritorijalni ekspanzionizam Srbije prema Bosni i Hercegovini (1804-2020) [The territorial expansionism of Serbia towards Bosnia and Herzegovina (1804-2020)] (in Bosnian). Sarajevo: University of Sarajevo. ISBN 9789958028380.

== Notes ==
Political offices
Preceded by Šefik Džaferović	Bosniak member of the Presidency of Bosnia and Herzegovina; 2022–present	Incumbent
Preceded by Željko Komšić	Chairman of the Presidency of Bosnia and Herzegovina; 2024	Succeeded by Željka Cvijanović
Preceded by Željko Komšić	Chairman of the Presidency of Bosnia and Herzegovina; 2026	Succeeded by Željka Cvijanović
