= Salmir Kaplan =

Member of the Federal House of Representatives
- Incumbent
- Assumed office 31 March 2015

Federal Minister of Culture and Sports
- In office 17 March 2011 – 31 March 2015
- Prime Minister: Nermin Nikšić
- Preceded by: Gavrilo Grahovac
- Succeeded by: Zora Dujmović

Personal details
- Born: 26 June 1981 (age 45) Stolac, SR Bosnia and Herzegovina, SFR Yugoslavia
- Party: Party of Democratic Action (2003–present)
- Education: University of Sarajevo; Istanbul University

Salmir Kaplan (born 26 June 1981) is a Bosnian politician who is a current member of the Federal House of Representatives. He also served as the Federal Minister of Culture and Sports from 2011 until 2015.
