= United Nations General Assembly Resolution 78/282 =

2024 resolution concerning Srebrenica

UN General Assembly Resolution 78/282
In favour
Against
Abstained
Absent
Non-UN member
- Date: May 23 2024
- Meeting no.: 82nd Plenary
- Code: A/78/L.67/Rev.1 (Document)
- Subject: International Day of Reflection and Commemoration of the 1995 Genocide in Srebrenica
- Voting summary: 84 voted for; 19 voted against; 68 abstained; 22 absent
- Result: Adopted

United Nations General Assembly Resolution 78/282 is a resolution adopted by the seventy-eighth session of the United Nations General Assembly on May 23, 2024, designating July 11 as the International Day of Reflection and Commemoration of the 1995 Genocide in Srebrenica.

The resolution, sponsored by Germany and Rwanda, and co-sponsored by more than 30 other countries, passed with 84 countries voting in favor, 68 abstaining, and 19 voting against.

== Voting ==
Vote	Tally	States
In favor	84	Albania, Andorra, Australia, Austria, Bangladesh, Belgium, Bosnia and Herzegovina, Brunei, Bulgaria, Cabo Verde, Canada, Chad, Chile, Colombia, Costa Rica, Croatia, Czechia, Denmark, Djibouti, Ecuador, Egypt, El Salvador, Estonia, Fiji, Finland, France, Gambia, Germany, Guinea-Bissau, Guyana, Iceland, Indonesia, Iran, Iraq, Ireland, Italy, Japan, Jordan, Kuwait, Latvia, Libya, Liechtenstein, Lithuania, Luxembourg, Malawi, Malaysia, Malta, Mauritania, Micronesia, Moldova, Montenegro, Myanmar, Netherlands, New Zealand, Niger, North Macedonia, Norway, Pakistan, Palau, Poland, Portugal, Qatar, Romania, Rwanda, San Marino, Saudi Arabia, Senegal, Sierra Leone, Singapore, Slovenia, South Africa, South Korea, Spain, Sweden, Switzerland, Tanzania, Tunisia, Turkey, Ukraine, United Kingdom, United States, Uruguay, Yemen, Zambia
Against	19	Antigua and Barbuda, Belarus, China, Comoros, Cuba, Democratic Republic of the Congo, Dominica, Eritrea, Eswatini, Grenada, Hungary, Mali, Nauru, Nicaragua, North Korea, Russia, São Tomé and Príncipe, Serbia, Syria
Abstain	68	Algeria, Angola, Argentina, Armenia, Bahamas, Bahrain, Barbados, Benin, Bhutan, Botswana, Brazil, Burundi, Cambodia, Cameroon, Cyprus, Dominican Republic, Equatorial Guinea, Ethiopia, Gabon, Georgia, Ghana, Greece, Guatemala, Guinea, Haiti, Honduras, India, Ivory Coast, Jamaica, Kazakhstan, Kenya, Kiribati, Laos, Lebanon, Lesotho, Madagascar, Maldives, Mexico, Mongolia, Mozambique, Namibia, Nepal, Nigeria, Oman, Panama, Papua New Guinea, Paraguay, Peru, Philippines, Republic of the Congo, Saint Kitts and Nevis, Saint Lucia, Saint Vincent and the Grenadines, Seychelles, Slovakia, Solomon Islands, South Sudan, Sri Lanka, Sudan, Suriname, Tajikistan, Thailand, Togo, Trinidad and Tobago, Tuvalu, Uganda, United Arab Emirates, Vietnam
Absent	22	Afghanistan, Azerbaijan, Belize, Bolivia, Burkina Faso, Central African Republic, East Timor, Israel, Kyrgyzstan, Liberia, Marshall Islands, Mauritius, Monaco, Morocco, Samoa, Somalia, Tonga, Turkmenistan, Uzbekistan, Vanuatu, Venezuela, Zimbabwe
Total	193	–

== See also ==
- Mothers of Srebrenica
