= Darijana Filipović =

Bosnian Croat politician (born 1987)

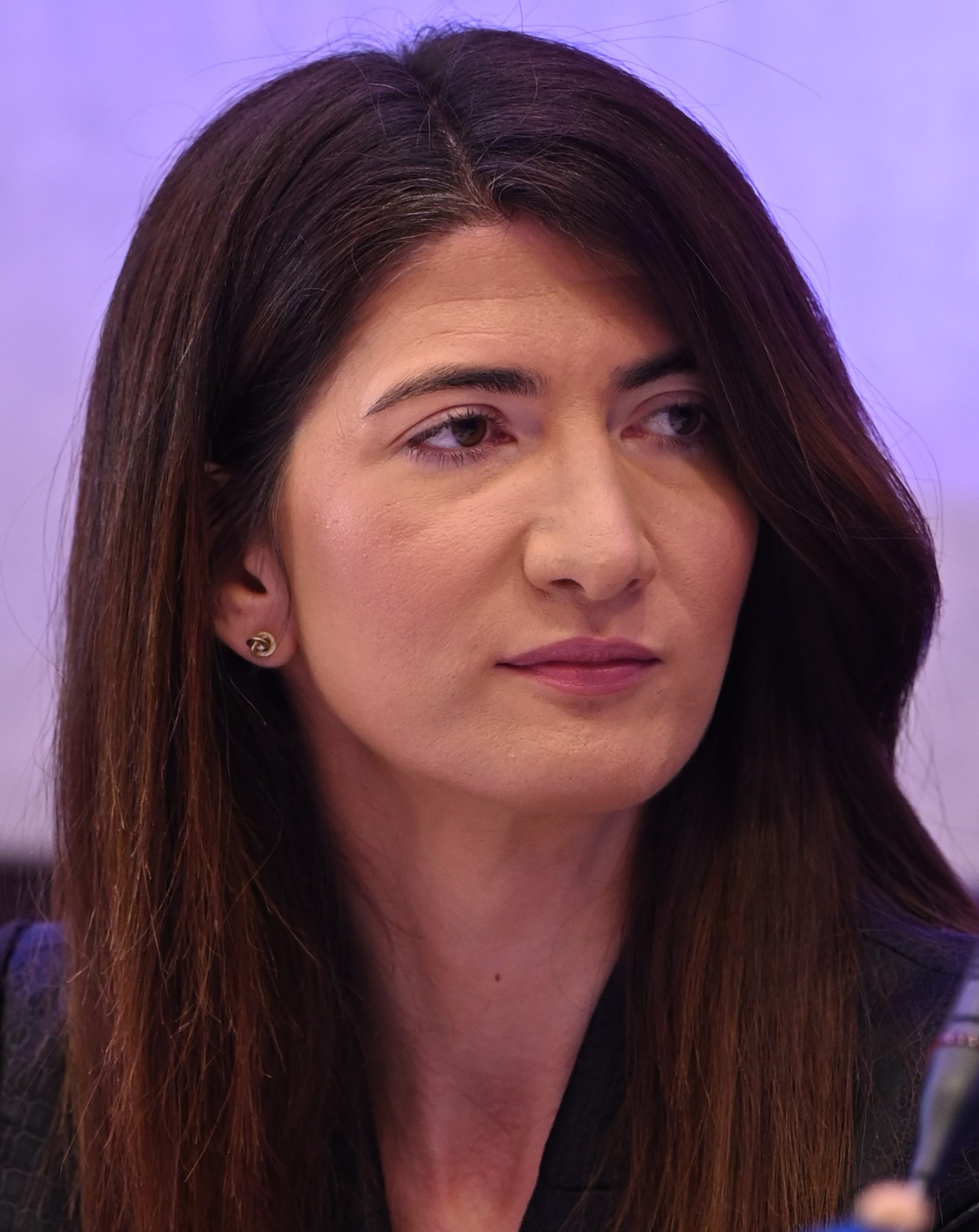
- Filipović in 2025

Croat member of the Presidency of Bosnia and Herzegovina
- Incumbent
- Assumed office 16 November 2026
- Prime Minister: Borjana Krišto
- Preceded by: Željko Komšić
Parliamentary offices
Member of the House of Representatives
In office 6 December 2018 – 16 November 2026
Constituency	2nd Electoral Unit
Member of the Federal House of Representatives
In office 2 December 2014 – 27 November 2018
Constituency	9th Electoral Unit

Personal details
- Born: Darijana Katić; 26 January 1987 (age 39) Mostar, SR Bosnia and Herzegovina, SFR Yugoslavia
- Party: Croatian Democratic Union (since 2011)
- Education: University of Mostar (BEc)

Darijana Filipović (née Katić; born 26 January 1987) is a Bosnian Croat politician who has served as the Croat member of the Presidency of Bosnia and Herzegovina since 2026. She previously served as member of the national House of Representatives from 2018 to 2026. Having also been a member of the Federal House of Representatives from 2014 to 2018, she is the current vice-president of the Croatian Democratic Union.

In the 2026 general election, Filipović was elected to the Bosnian Presidency. She was sworn in as Presidency member in November 2026.

== Early life and education ==
Filipović was born on 26 January 1987 in Mostar and grew up in Stolac, where she finished gymnasium. She graduated at the Faculty of Economics, University of Mostar in 2011.

== Career ==
A member of the Croatian Democratic Union (HDZ BiH) since 2011, Filipović was the secretary general of the HDZ BiH Cantonal Committee of the Herzegovina-Neretva Canton until 2014, and is currently one of the party's vice-presidents.

In the 2014 general election, she was elected to the Federal House of Representatives. She was then elected to the national House of Representatives in the 2018 general election for the 2nd Electoral Unit of the FBiH. She was re-elected to office in the 2022 general election, obtaining over 20,000 votes.

== Presidency (2026–present) ==
=== 2026 general election ===
In April 2026, the HDZ BiH announced Filipović's candidacy for the Presidency of Bosnia and Herzegovina in the October 2026 general election, as a Croat member of the presidency. Filipović went on to win the election, winning 47.28% of the vote, opposed to Democratic Front candidate Slaven Kovačević's 30.03% and independent candidate Zdenko Lučić's 22.69%.

=== Tenure ===
Filipović was sworn in as Presidency member on 16 November 2026, alongside re-elected members Denis Bećirović and Željka Cvijanović.

== Personal life ==
Filipović is married, living in Mostar with her husband. Her twin sister, Andrijana Katić, is also a member of the HDZ BiH and currently serves as the Federal Minister of Traffic and Communication. Their cousin is professional footballer Nikola Katić.

Political offices
Preceded by Željko Komšić	Croat member of the Presidency of Bosnia and Herzegovina; 2026–present	Incumbent
