= Croatian Republican Party =

Bosnian Croat political party

Croatian Republican Party Hrvatska republikanska stranka
- Abbreviation: HRS
- President and founder: Slaven Raguž
- Founded: 11 May 2014; 12 years ago
- Split from: Croatian Democratic Union 1990
- Headquarters: Nikole Šubića Zrinskog 13, Mostar
- Ideology: Conservatism; Christian democracy; Pro-Europeanism; Decentralization; Federalism
- Political position: Centre-right
- National affiliation: Croatian Five
- Colours: Dark gray
- HoR BiH: 0 / 42
- HoP BiH: 0 / 15
- HoR FBiH: 1 / 98
- HoP FBiH: 0 / 80

Website
- hrsbih.org

The Croatian Republican Party (Croatian: Hrvatska republikanska stranka, HRS) is a Croat conservative, centre-right political party in Bosnia and Herzegovina. The party also participates in 11th electoral district for Croatian parliament in cooperation with The Bridge.

== History ==
The HRS was founded on 11 May 2014 by HDZ 1990 dissidents led by Slaven Raguž. At the founding assembly held at the Croatian Lodge "Herceg Stjepan Kosača", Slaven Raguž, who had recently left the HDZ 1990 as president of the Mostar City Committee and a member of the party's Central Committee, was elected acting president of the HRS. In 1990, several former HDZ officials, activists and young Croat intellectuals in BiH founded a new political party aimed at being an alternative to the ruling parties and fighting harder to establish a majority Croat federal unit within BiH. Former member of the HDZ 1990 Presidency, Slaven Bevanda, then Ivica Barabarić, Ivica Pušić and Dalibor Ravić were also elected to the interim presidency, which will lead the party until the convention. According to Raguž, HRS aims to be a political alternative at lower levels, but will be open to co-operation with parties seeking to improve the position of Croats in BiH: "The primary focus is on resolving the constitutional and legal status of Croats in BiH, BiH regulated on consociational and federalist principles, for BiH tailored to all three of its constituent peoples and all its citizens, where the Croatian issue would be resolved through an administrative territorial unit with a relative Croat majority".

In the 2022 Federation of Bosnia and Herzegovina general election, the party won a total of six seats in the Assemblies of the cantons of the Federation of Bosnia and Herzegovina and Raguž won a seat in the House of Representatives in the 9th Electoral Unit.

The party became a member of the Croatian Five coalition in April 2025 which was formalized in January 2026 to run in the 2026 Bosnian general election.

== Elections ==
=== Parliamentary Assembly of Bosnia and Herzegovina ===
Parliamentary Assembly of Bosnia and Herzegovina
Year	#	Popular vote	%	HoR	Seat change	HoP	Seat change	Government
2022	24th	11,231	0.71	0 / 42	New	0 / 15	New	Extra-parliamentary
2026 (Note: Run as part of Croatian Five, which won a single seat that went to HDZ 1990.)	10th	36,637	2.71	0 / 42	0	0 / 15	0	Extra-parliamentary

=== Parliament of the Federation of Bosnia and Herzegovina ===
Parliament of the Federation of Bosnia and Herzegovina
Year	#	Popular vote	%	HoR	Seat change	HoP	Seat change	Government
2018	18th	6,670	0.67	0 / 98	New	0 / 58	New	Extra-parliamentary
2022	15th	13,050	1.34	1 / 98	▲1	0 / 80	0	Opposition
2026 (Note: Run in a coalition with HDZ 1990, HSS BiH and HDS.)	9th	26,520	3.31	1 / 98	0	TBD	TBD	TBD

=== Presidency elections ===
Presidency of Bosnia and Herzegovina
Election year	#	Candidate	Votes	%	Representing	Note	Elected?
2026	3rd	Zdenko Lučić	57,924	22.69%	Croats	Support	No

=== Cantonal assembly elections ===
Cantonal election	Cantonal Assembly										
Cantonal election	Una-Sana	Posavina	Tuzla	Zenica-Doboj	Bosnian Podrinje Goražde	Central Bosnia	Herzegovina-Neretva	West Herzegovina	Sarajevo	Canton 10	Total won / Total contested
2014	0 / 30	0 / 21	0 / 35	0 / 35	0 / 25	0 / 30	0 / 30	0 / 23	0 / 35	0 / 25	0 / 289
2018	0 / 30	0 / 21	0 / 35	0 / 35	0 / 25	0 / 30	1 / 30	2 / 23	0 / 35	1 / 25	4 / 289
2022	0 / 30	1 / 21	0 / 35	0 / 35	0 / 25	0 / 30	2 / 30	2 / 23	0 / 35	1 / 25	6 / 289
2026	0 / 30	1 / 21	0 / 35	0 / 35	0 / 25	0 / 30	2 / 30	2 / 23	0 / 35	0 / 25	5 / 289

=== Croatian Parliament ===
Croatian Parliament
Year	#	Popular vote	% of popular vote	11th district	Seat change	Note
2020	3rd	3,141	6.64%	0 / 3	New	on the MOST list
2024	2nd	2,684	11.05%	0 / 3	Steady	on the MOST list
