= Ilija Cvitanović =

Bosnian politician (born 1974)

- Cvitanović in 2026

Member of the House of Peoples
- Incumbent
- Assumed office 16 February 2023

President of the Croatian Democratic Union 1990
- Incumbent
- Assumed office 9 January 2016
- Preceded by: Martin Raguž

Personal details
- Born: 13 May 1976 (age 50) Prozor-Rama, SR Bosnia and Herzegovina, SFR Yugoslavia
- Party: Croatian Democratic Union 1990
- Spouse: Marija Cvitanović
- Children: 3
- Education: University of Zagreb (BEc)

Ilija Cvitanović (born 13 May 1976) is a Bosnian Croat politician who has served as member of the national House of Peoples since 2023. A member of the Croatian Democratic Union 1990, he has served as the party's president since May 2016. He previously served as the Minister of Transport and Communications of the Herzegovina-Neretva Canton from 2011 to 2014.

== Early life and education ==
Cvitanović was born on 13 May 1976, in Prozor-Rama, SR Bosnia and Herzegovina, SFR Yugoslavia. He completed his secondary education at the Franciscan Classical Grammar School in Visoko in 1995. In 2002, he graduated from the Faculty of Economics and Business at the University of Zagreb, specializing in marketing.

== Career ==
Early in his professional career, Cvitanović worked at the Elektrobosna metal alloy factory in Jajce and later served in the Intelligence-Security Agency of Bosnia and Herzegovina (OSA BiH).

Cvitanović entered politics as a member of the Croatian Democratic Union 1990 (HDZ 1990) and was elected across multiple terms to the Assembly of the Herzegovina-Neretva Canton. On 9 November 2011, following the formation of a new cantonal government, Cvitanović was appointed Minister of Transport and Communications of the Herzegovina-Neretva Canton. He held the position until 13 June 2014, when he was dismissed alongside all other HDZ 1990 cabinet members.

Following the resignation of party president Martin Raguž, Cvitanović was named acting president of the HDZ 1990 on 9 January 2016. On 7 May 2016, he won the party's leadership election, defeating opponent Diana Zelenika with 303 votes to 109.

Cvitanović was selected as one of the five delegates representing Croats in the national House of Peoples following the 2022 general election.

== Personal life ==
Cvitanović is married to Marija Cvitanović and they have three sons. They live in Mostar.
