= Slaven Kovačević =

Bosnian university lecturer and politician (born 1955)

- Born: 3 March 1972 (age 54); Sarajevo, SR Bosnia and Herzegovina, SFR Yugoslavia
- Education: University of Sarajevo (BA, MA, PhD)
- Political party: Democratic Front
- Other political affiliations: Social Democratic Party

Slaven Kovačević (born 3 March 1972) is a Bosnian political scientist, university lecturer, and politician. He has been active in academia and in local and national politics, and is a member of the Democratic Front.

Kovačević is known for his legal challenge before the European Court of Human Rights concerning electoral discrimination in Bosnia and Herzegovina. He ran for Croat member of the Presidency of Bosnia and Herzegovina in the 2026 general election, but failed to get elected.

== Education and academic career ==
Born in Sarajevo on 3 March 1972, Kovačević completed his higher education at the University of Sarajevo's Faculty of Political Sciences, where he obtained a PhD in Political Science in 2016. He has been engaged in teaching and academic work since the mid-2010s. In 2015, he worked as a professor at the Second Gymnasium in Sarajevo. Since 2019, Kovačević has served as a docent at the Faculty of Administration in Sarajevo, where he teaches courses related to European integration and governance.

== Political career ==
Formerly a member of the Social Democratic Party (SDP BiH), Kovačević served as a councilor in the Municipal Council of Centar, Sarajevo during three terms (2004–2008, 2008–2012, and 2012–2016). In addition, he was a councilor in the Sarajevo City Council from 2010 to 2012 and from 2014 until 2016.

After leaving the SDP BiH, Kovačević joined the Democratic Front, and was appointed Advisor for Foreign Policy in the Cabinet of Željko Komšić, the Croat member of the Presidency of Bosnia and Herzegovina, in 2018. In December 2025, he announced his intent to run for the Croat member of the presidency in the October 2026 general election. Ultimately, Kovačević failed to get elected, earning 30.03% of the vote, opposed to Darijana Filipović's (HDZ BiH) 47.28% who was elected.

== Legal proceedings and judgment ==
Kovačević brought an application against Bosnia and Herzegovina before the European Court of Human Rights (ECHR) in 2022, claiming that his right to political participation had been violated. He argued that, as a citizen who does not declare affiliation with any of the country’s constituent peoples (Bosniaks, Croats, or Serbs), he was discriminated against and prevented from standing for election to the Presidency of Bosnia and Herzegovina and the House of Peoples of Bosnia and Herzegovina.

In an initial judgment delivered in August 2023, a Chamber of the Court found that the constitutional and electoral framework of Bosnia and Herzegovina had violated his rights under the European Convention on Human Rights. However, following a referral, the case was reviewed by the Grand Chamber of the European Court of Human Rights, which in June 2025 overturned the earlier judgment. The Grand Chamber held that Kovačević had failed to demonstrate that he was directly and personally affected by the alleged violations, that he had not exhausted available domestic legal remedies, and that his application constituted an abuse of the right to petition. The Court therefore concluded that he did not have victim status under the Convention and dismissed the application.

Kovačević publicly stated that he considered the decision to be politically motivated, disputing the Court’s reasoning and maintaining that the judgment failed to address systemic discrimination embedded in Bosnia and Herzegovina’s constitutional and electoral framework.
