= Marinko Božović =

Bosnian Serb politician (born 1983)

- Маринко Божовић

Municipal Mayor of Istočna Ilidža
- Incumbent
- Assumed office 8 November 2016
- Preceded by: Miljan Damjanović (acting)
Parliamentary offices
Member of the National Assembly of Republika Srpska
In office 24 November 2014 – 8 November 2016
Constituency	8th Electoral Unit

Personal details
- Born: 27 January 1985 (age 41) Sarajevo, SR Bosnia and Herzegovina, SFR Yugoslavia
- Party: Serb Democratic Party
- Children: 2
- Education: University of East Sarajevo (BEc)

Marinko Božović (Serbian Cyrillic: Маринко Божовић; born 27 January 1985) is a Bosnian Serb politician who has served as municipal mayor of Istočna Ilidža since 2016. He previously served as member of the National Assembly of Republika Srpska from 2014 to 2016. He is a member of the Serb Democratic Party.

Božović ran for Serb member of the Presidency of Bosnia and Herzegovina in the 2026 general election, but failed to get elected.

== Education ==
Božović was born on 27 January 1985 in Sarajevo. He graduated from the Faculty of Economics at the University of East Sarajevo in 2009.

== Career ==
After completing his studies, Božović began his career at UNIQA Insurance as an analyst and sales associate before being promoted to branch manager in Istočno Sarajevo. He later joined the Municipality of Istočna Ilidža, where he served as an adviser to the mayor on economic affairs and cooperation with non-governmental organizations.

A member of the Serb Democratic Party (SDS), Božović was elected to the National Assembly of Republika Srpska in the 2014 general election. In the 2016 municipal elections, he was elected municipal mayor of Istočna Ilidža. He was re-elected in 2020 and 2024.

In July 2026, the SDS announced Božović's candidacy for the Presidency of Bosnia and Herzegovina in the October 2026 general election, as a Serb member of the presidency. Ultimately, he failed to get elected, earning 26.38% of the vote, opposed to the re-elected incumbent Željka Cvijanović's 55.57% total vote share.

== Personal life ==
Božović is married and has two children.
