= House of Peoples of Bosnia and Herzegovina =

Upper house of Bosnia and Herzegovina

House of Peoples of Bosnia and Herzegovina Dom naroda Bosne i Hercegovine Дом народа Босне и Херцеговине
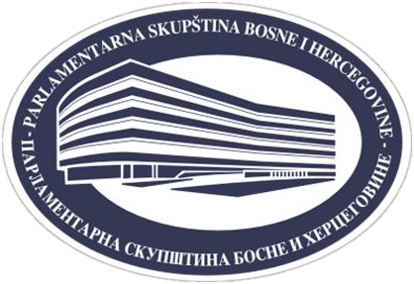

Type
- Type: Upper house

History
- Founded: 3 January 1997; 29 years ago

Leadership
- Chairman: Dragan Čović (HDZ BiH) since 16 June 2026
- Vice-chairmen: Nikola Špirić (SNSD); Kemal Ademović (CL)

Structure
- Seats: 15
- Political groups: Bosniak caucus (5): SDA (2); SBiH (1); DF (1); CL (1); Croat caucus (5): HDZ BiH (3); HDZ 1990 (1); Independent (1); Serb caucus (5): SNSD (3); SDS (1); PDP (1)
- Length of term: 4 years
- Salary: 2,564 EUR per month

Elections
- Last election: 16 February 2023

Meeting place
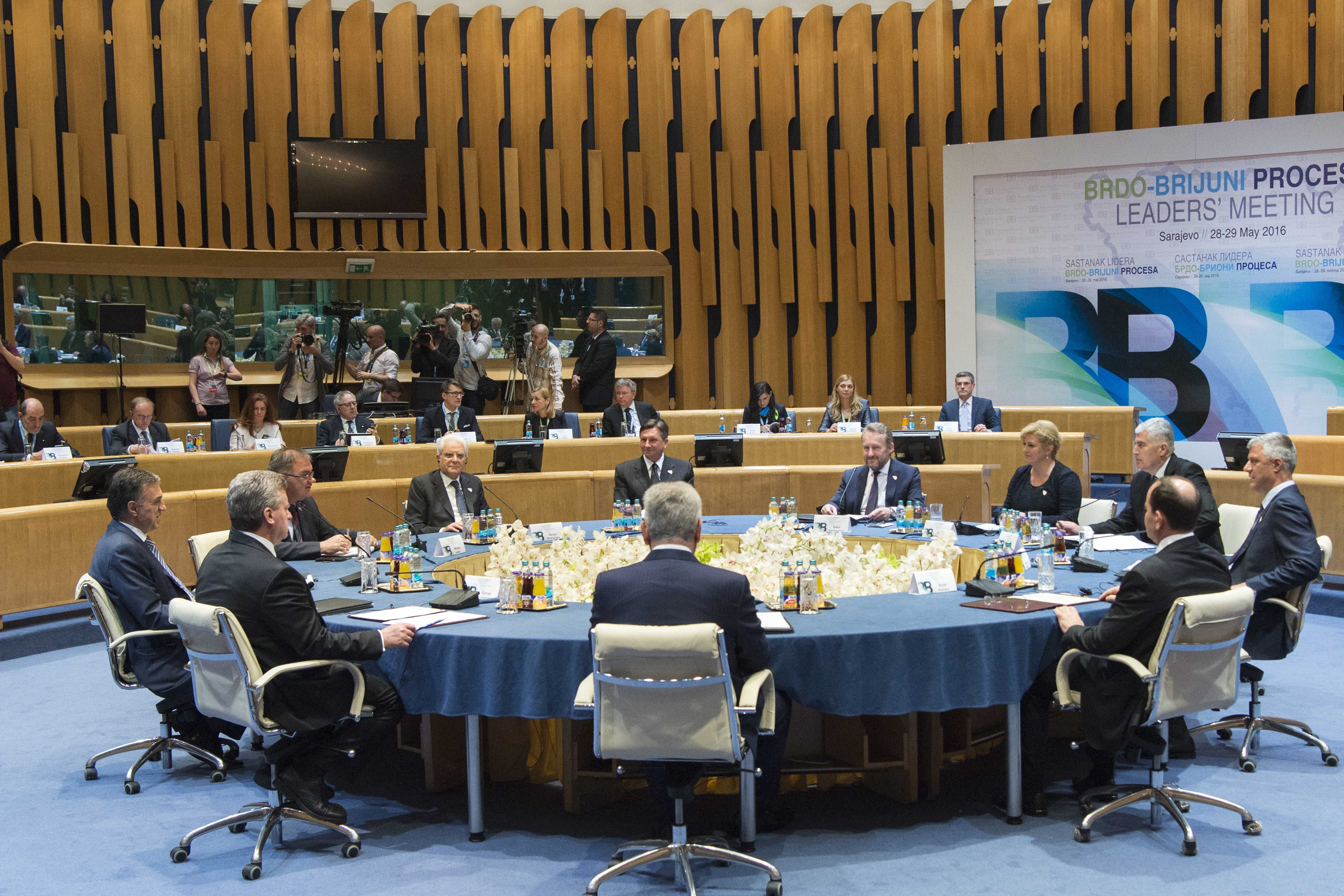
- House of Peoples Chamber; Parliament Building; Sarajevo, Bosnia and Herzegovina; 43°51′16.48″N 18°24′20.63″E

Website
- www.parlament.ba

The House of Peoples of Bosnia and Herzegovina (Serbo-Croatian: Dom naroda Bosne i Hercegovine/Дом народа Босне и Херцеговине) is one of the two chambers of the Parliamentary Assembly of Bosnia and Herzegovina, with the other chamber being the House of Representatives of Bosnia and Herzegovina. It was established through the signing of the Dayton Agreement in 1995.

It has 15 members equally distributed among the three ethnic groups in Bosnia and Herzegovina: 5 Bosniaks, 5 Serbs, and 5 Croats. According to the Constitution of Bosnia and Herzegovina, the members of the House of Peoples are appointed so that "designated Croat and Bosniak delegates from the Federation shall be selected, respectively, by the Croat and Bosniak delegates to the House of Peoples of the Federation. Delegates from Republika Srpska shall be selected by the National Assembly of the Republika Srpska."

== List of delegates ==
=== Bosniak delegates ===
Convocation	Delegates				
1996–1998	Mirsad Ćeman (SDA)	Avdo Čampara (SDA)	Adem Borić (SDA)	Mehmed Čorhodžić (SDA)	Salih Kulenović (SDA)
1998–2000	Šefik Džaferović (SDA)	Avdo Čampara (SDA)	Ismet Šarčević (SDA)	Mugdim Herceg (SDP BiH)	Izet Žigić (SBiH)
2000–2002	Šefik Džaferović (SDA)	Halid Genjac (SDA)	Ibrahim Spahić (GDS)	Sejfudin Tokić (SDP BiH)	Munib Jusufović (SBiH)
2002–2006	Hasan Čengić (SDA)	Halid Genjac (SDA)	Osman Brka (SDA)	Hilmo Neimarlija (SDA)/(SBiH)	Mustafa Pamuk (SBiH)
2006–2010	Sulejman Tihić (SDA)	Hazim Rančić (SDA)	Alma Čolo (SDA)	Hilmo Neimarlija (SDA)/(SBiH)	Adem Ibrahimpašić (SDP BiH)
2010–2014	Sulejman Tihić (SDA)	Halid Genjac (SDA)	Nermina Kapetanović (SDA)	Seudin Hodžić (SDP BiH)	Mehmed Bradarić (SDP BiH)
2014–2018	Safet Softić (SDA)	Halid Genjac (SDA)	Sead Kadić (SDA)	Sifet Podžić (DF)	Fahrudin Radončić (SBB BiH)
2018–2022	Bakir Izetbegović (SDA)	Asim Sarajlić (SDA)	Amir Fazlić (SDA)	Denis Bećirović (SDP BiH)	Munib Jusufović (SBB BiH)
2022–	Šefik Džaferović (SDA)	Safet Softić (SDA)	Kemal Ademović (NiP)/(CL)	Dženan Đonlagić (DF)	Džemal Smajić (SBiH)

=== Croat delegates ===
Convocation	Delegates				
1996–1998	Mariofil Ljubić (HDZ BiH)	Petar Majić (HDZ BiH)	Pero Marković (HDZ BiH)	Stipo Vujević (HDZ BiH)	Ivo Andrić Lužanski (HDZ BiH)
1998–2000	Ivan Madunić (HDZ BiH)	Zoran Marić (HDZ BiH)	Vladimir Šoljić (HDZ BiH)	Vinko Zorić (HDZ BiH)	Ivo Živković (HDZ BiH)/(NHI)
2000–2002	Ivo Divković (SDP BiH)	Niko Sušac (SDP BiH)	Jerko Ivanković (NSRzB)	Ilija Šimić (HSS BiH)	Ivo Živković (HDZ BiH)/(NHI)
2002–2006	Tomislav Limov (SDP BiH)	Velimir Jukić (HDZ BiH)	Anto Spajić (HDZ BiH)	Branko Zrno (HDZ BiH)	Ilija Filipović (HDZ BiH)
2006–2010	Rudo Vidović (HDZ 1990)	Božo Rajić (HDZ 1990)	Ivo Miro Jović (HDZ BiH)	Branko Zrno (HDZ BiH)	Ilija Filipović (HDZ BiH)
2010–2014	Krunoslav Vrdoljak (SDP BiH)	Martin Raguž (HDZ 1990)	Stjepan Krešić (HSP BiH)	Dragan Čović (HDZ BiH)	Borjana Krišto (HDZ BiH)
2014–2018	Mario Karamatić (HSS BiH)	Martin Raguž (HDZ 1990)	Ljilja Zovko (HDZ BiH)	Zdenka Džambas (HDZ BiH)	Bariša Čolak (HDZ BiH)
2018–2022	Zlatko Miletić (DF)/(ZNG)	Lidija Bradara (HDZ BiH)	Marina Pendeš (HDZ BiH)	Dragan Čović (HDZ BiH)	Bariša Čolak (HDZ BiH)
2022–	Zlatko Miletić (DF)/(ZNG)	Ilija Cvitanović (HDZ 1990)	Marina Pendeš (HDZ BiH)	Dragan Čović (HDZ BiH)	Zdenko Ćosić (HDZ BiH)

=== Serb delegates ===
Convocation	Delegates				
1996–1998	Momir Tošić (SDS)	Milan Krnjajić (SDS)	Vojislav Maksimović (SDS)	Borislav Paravac (SDS)	Borivoje Sendić (SDS)
1998–2000	Momir Tošić (SDS)	Drago Ljubičić (SNS)	Đoko Pajić (SRSRS)	Momir Malić (SP)	Ristan Ristić (SNSD)
2000–2002	Momčilo Novaković (SDS)	Nikola Špirić (PDP)	Dragutin Rodić (DNS)	Dragutin Ilić (SP)	Goran Turjačanin (SNSD)
2002–2006	Nade Radović (SDS)	Goran Milojević (PDP)	Vinko Radovanović (PDP)	Zoran Spasojević (SDS)	Boško Šiljegović (SDS)
2006–2010	Slobodan Šaraba (SDS)	Mladen Ivanić (PDP)	Dušanka Majkić (SNSD)	Drago Ljubičić (SNSD)	Zoran Koprivica (SNSD)
2010–2014	Ognjen Tadić (SDS)/(DNS)	Mladen Ivanić (PDP)	Dragutin Rodić (DNS)	Krstan Simić (SNSD)	Staša Košarac (SNSD)
2014–2018	Ognjen Tadić (SDS)/(DNS)	Darko Babalj (SDS)	Dragutin Rodić (DNS)	Nebojša Radmanović (SNSD)	Sredoje Nović (SNSD)
2018–2022	Lazar Prodanović (SNSD)	Mladen Bosić (SDS)	Dušanka Majkić (SNSD)	Nikola Špirić (SNSD)	Sredoje Nović (SNSD)
2022–	Radovan Kovačević (SNSD)	Želimir Nešković (SDS)	Nenad Vuković (PDP)	Nikola Špirić (SNSD)	Sredoje Nović (SNSD)

== Chairmen of the House of Peoples ==
#	Name	Term of Office		Party
1	Momir Tošić	3 January 1997	2 September 1997	SDS
2	Avdo Čampara	3 September 1997	2 May 1998	SDA
3	Petar Majić	3 May 1998	3 December 1998	HDZ BiH
4	Vladimir Šoljić	4 December 1998	3 August 1999	HDZ BiH
5	Izet Žigić	4 August 1999	3 April 2000	SBiH
6	Drago Ljubičić	4 April 2000	20 March 2001	SNS
7	Ilija Šimić	20 March 2001	19 November 2001	HSS BiH
8	Sejfudin Tokić	20 November 2001	19 July 2002	SDP BiH
9	Nikola Špirić	20 July 2002	31 January 2003	SNSD
10	Velimir Jukić	31 January 2003	29 September 2003	HDZ BiH
11	Mustafa Pamuk	30 September 2003	30 May 2004	SDA
12	Goran Milojević	31 May 2004	30 January 2005	PDP
13	Velimir Jukić	31 January 2005	29 September 2005	HDZ BiH
14	Mustafa Pamuk	30 September 2005	30 May 2006	SDA
15	Goran Milojević	31 May 2006	14 March 2007	PDP
16	Ilija Filipović	14 March 2007	13 November 2007	HDZ BiH
17	Sulejman Tihić	14 November 2007	13 July 2008	SDA
18	Mladen Ivanić	14 July 2008	26 February 2009	PDP
19	Dušanka Majkić	26 February 2009	13 March 2009	SNSD
20	Ilija Filipović	14 March 2009	13 November 2009	HDZ BiH
21	Sulejman Tihić	14 November 2009	13 July 2010	SDA
22	Dušanka Majkić	14 July 2010	9 June 2011	SNSD
23	Ognjen Tadić	9 June 2011	8 February 2012	SDS
24	Dragan Čović	9 February 2012	8 October 2012	HDZ BiH
25	Sulejman Tihić	9 October 2012	8 June 2013	SDA
26	Ognjen Tadić	9 June 2013	5 November 2013	SDS
27	Staša Košarac	5 November 2013	8 February 2014	SNSD
28	Dragan Čović	9 February 2014	17 November 2014	HDZ BiH
29	Bariša Čolak	16 February 2015	16 October 2015	HDZ BiH
30	Ognjen Tadić	17 October 2015	15 June 2016	SDS
31	Safet Softić	16 June 2016	15 February 2017	SDA
32	Bariša Čolak	16 February 2017	15 October 2017	HDZ BiH
33	Ognjen Tadić	16 October 2017	15 June 2018	DNS
34	Safet Softić	16 June 2018	6 December 2018	SDA
35	Bariša Čolak	7 December 2018	28 February 2019	HDZ BiH
36	Bakir Izetbegović	28 February 2019	28 October 2019	SDA
37	Dragan Čović	28 October 2019	28 June 2020	HDZ BiH
38	Nikola Špirić	28 June 2020	28 February 2021	SNSD
39	Bakir Izetbegović	28 February 2021	28 October 2021	SDA
40	Dragan Čović	28 October 2021	28 June 2022	HDZ BiH
41	Nikola Špirić	28 June 2022	16 October 2023	SNSD
42	Kemal Ademović	16 October 2023	16 June 2024	NiP
43	Dragan Čović	16 June 2024	16 February 2025	HDZ BiH
44	Nikola Špirić	16 February 2025	16 October 2025	SNSD
45	Kemal Ademović	16 October 2025	16 June 2026	CL
46	Dragan Čović	16 June 2026	Incumbent	HDZ BiH

== See also ==
- Politics of Bosnia and Herzegovina
- House of Representatives of Bosnia and Herzegovina
- Parliamentary Assembly of Bosnia and Herzegovina
