= Croatian Democratic Union 1990 =

Croatian Democratic Union 1990 Hrvatska demokratska zajednica 1990
- President: Ilija Cvitanović
- Founder: Božo Ljubić
- Founded: 16 April 2006
- Split from: Croatian Democratic Union of Bosnia and Herzegovina
- Headquarters: Kneza Branimira 2, Mostar
- Youth wing: Youth of the HDZ 1990
- Ideology: Christian democracy Conservatism; Croatian nationalism Federalism; Pro-Europeanism
- Political position: Centre-right
- National affiliation: Croatian Five; HDZ 1990 – HNP
- European affiliation: European People's Party (observer)
- International affiliation: International Democracy Union (formerly)
- HoR BiH: 1 / 42
- HoP BiH: 1 / 15
- HoR FBiH: 3 / 98
- HoP FBiH: 3 / 80
- NA RS: 0 / 83

Website
- hdz1990.ba

The Croatian Democratic Union 1990 (Croatian: Hrvatska demokratska zajednica 1990, abbr. HDZ 1990) is a political party of Croats in Bosnia and Herzegovina. It split from the Croatian Democratic Union of Bosnia and Herzegovina and is led by Ilija Cvitanović. In 2006, it was the leading member of the Croats Together (Hrvatsko zajedništvo) coalition.

On 12 September 2014, the HDZ 1990 was admitted as an observer member to the European People's Party.

== History ==
The Croatian Democratic Union 1990 was founded on 8 April 2006 in Mostar. It was formed by splitting from the Croatian Democratic Union of Bosnia and Herzegovina (HDZ BiH). Božo Ljubić, who in July 2005 was the opponent of Dragan Čović for the position of president of the HDZ BiH, was elected president.

At the time of the attempted constitutional changes in 2006, HDZ 1990 opposed the changes contained in the "April Package", which according to the party was "harmful to the Croat position". In the House of Representatives of Bosnia and Herzegovina, the HDZ 1990 Club independently offered its own amendments and, subject to their acceptance, expressed its readiness to accept the constitutional changes, but their amendments were not accepted. For this reason, on April 26, 2006, representatives of HDZ 1990, together with representatives of Haris Silajdžić's Party for Bosnia and Herzegovina, defeated the Travanjski package in the House of Representatives of the Federation of Bosnia and Herzegovina. The overthrow of the April package, which would have cemented the two-entity BiH, made HDZ 1990 popular among Croats.

Following the 2006 Bosnian general election, HSP, SDA and SNSD. Nediljko Rimac of HDZ 1990 was appointed Prime Minister of Canton 10, and Drago Stanić of the HSP was appointed President of the Canton.

In January 2007, Zvonko Jurišić, the president of the HSP, was appointed Prime Minister of the West Herzegovina Canton.

At the Fourth Congress of HDZ 1990 held on 6 July 2013, Martin Raguž was elected party president. He received 395 votes in the election, while his opponent, Slaven Raguž, received 136 votes. Božo Ljubić left the party on 29 April 2014.

In the 2014 general elections, HDZ 1990 nominated Martin Raguž as its candidate for the Croat member of the Presidency of Bosnia and Herzegovina, but he finished second, with 94,695 votes, or 38.6%. The majority of Raguž's votes came from Bosniak-majority areas. Raguž received significant support in Sarajevo, Tuzla, Zenica and other Bosniak-majority cities, while his party received minor support in those areas. Dragan Čović was elected as the Croat member of the Presidency.

The HDZ 1990 County Board of the West Herzegovina Canton requested Raguž's resignation in December 2015 due to "general inactivity and party laziness and the worsening party situation on the ground". Raguž resigned on 23 December 2015, citing health problems with his spine. He was replaced by Ilija Cvitanović.

== Election results ==
=== Parliamentary elections ===
Parliamentary Assembly of Bosnia and Herzegovina
Year	#	Popular vote	%	HoR	Seat change	HoP	Seat change	Government
2006 (Note: Run as part of the Croats Together coalition.)	7th	52,686	3.73	2 / 42	New	2 / 15	New	Coalition
2010 (Note: Run as part of the Croatian Coalition.)	8th	50,071	3.05	1 / 42	▼1	1 / 15	▼1	Coalition
2014	9th	40,113	2.46	1 / 42	0	1 / 15	0	Opposition
2018 (Note: Run in coalition with HSP.)	14th	28,962	1.75	0 / 42	▼1	0 / 15	▼1	Extra-parliamentary
2022 (Note: Run in coalition with HNP.)	14th	25,691	1.62	0 / 42	0	1 / 15	▲1	Support
2026 (Note: Run as part of Croatian Five, which won a single seat that went to HDZ 1990.)	10th	36.637	2.71	1 / 42	▲1	TBD	TBD	TBD

=== Presidency elections ===
Presidency of Bosnia and Herzegovina
Election year	#	Candidate	Votes	%	Representing	Note	Elected?
2006	3rd	Božo Ljubić	53,325	18.2%	Croats	—	No
2010	3rd	Martin Raguž	60,266	10.84%	Croats	—	No
2014	2nd	Martin Raguž	94,695	38.61%	Croats	—	No
2018	3rd	Diana Zelenika	25,890	6.04%	Croats	—	No
2022	2rd	Borjana Krišto	180,255	44.20%	Croats	Support	No
2026	3rd	Zdenko Lučić	56,208	22.78%	Croats	Support	No

=== Cantonal elections ===
Cantonal election	Cantonal Assembly										
Cantonal election	Una-Sana	Posavina	Tuzla	Zenica-Doboj	Bosnian Podrinje Goražde	Central Bosnia	Herzegovina-Neretva	West Herzegovina	Sarajevo	Canton 10	Total won / Total contested
2006	0 / 30	5 / 21	0 / 35	0 / 35	0 / 25	3 / 30	7 / 30	8 / 23	0 / 35	6 / 25	29 / 289
2010	0 / 30	5 / 21	0 / 35	0 / 35	0 / 25	2 / 30	3 / 30	4 / 23	0 / 35	4 / 25	18 / 289
2014	0 / 30	7 / 21	0 / 35	0 / 35	0 / 25	2 / 30	3 / 30	4 / 23	0 / 35	4 / 25	20 / 289
2018	0 / 30	3 / 21	0 / 35	0 / 35	0 / 25	1 / 30	2 / 30	3 / 23	0 / 35	4 / 25	13 / 289
2022	0 / 30	2 / 21	0 / 35	0 / 35	0 / 25	2 / 30	3 / 30	4 / 23	0 / 35	4 / 25	15 / 289
2026	0 / 30	1 / 21	0 / 35	0 / 35	0 / 25	2 / 30	2 / 30	2 / 23	0 / 35	4 / 25	11 / 289

== See also ==
- Croatian Democratic Union of Bosnia and Herzegovina
- Croatian Democratic Union
