= Lukavica (Istočno Novo Sarajevo) =

Lukavica Лукавица
- Urban neighborhood
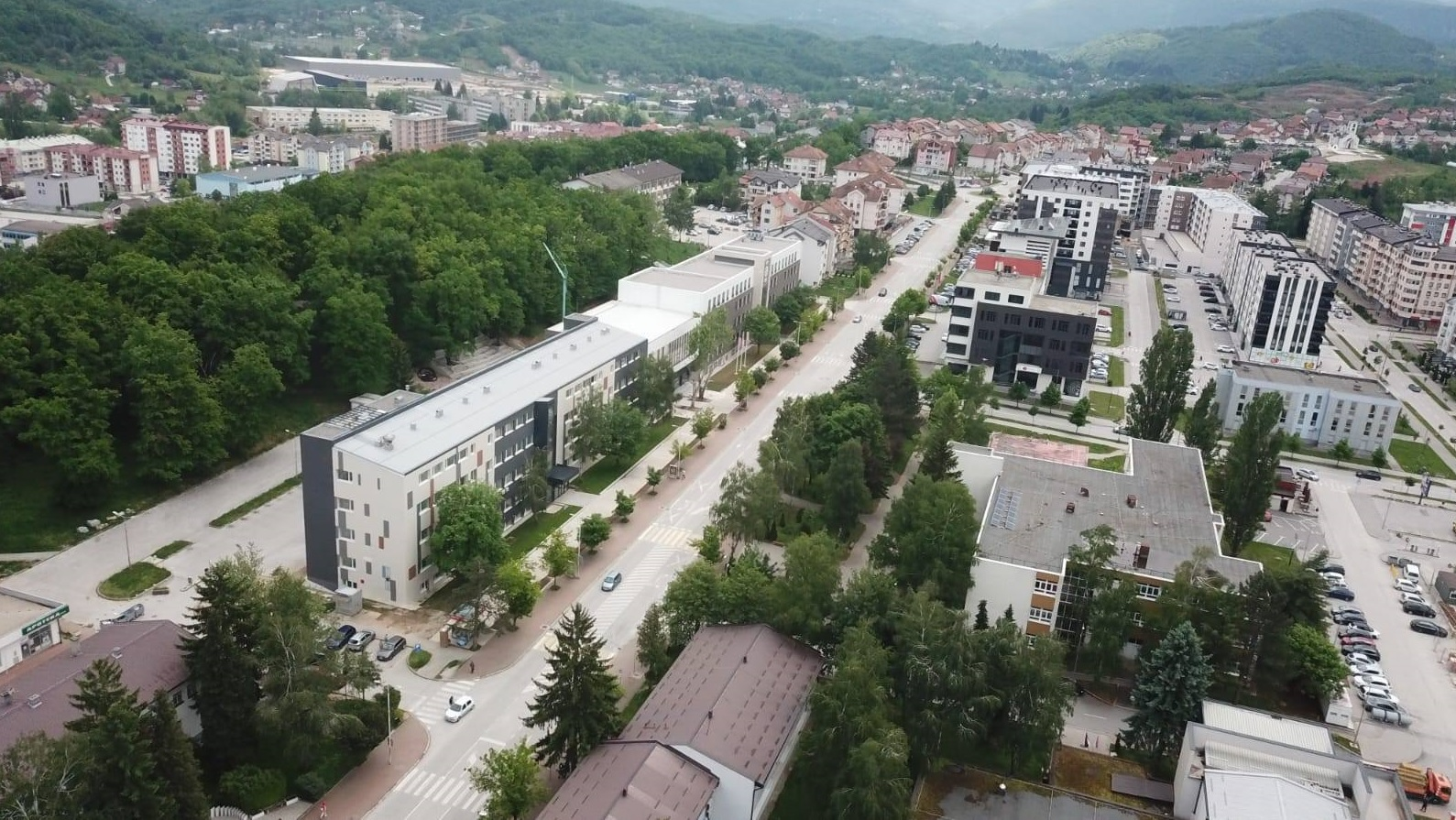
- Lukavica skyline

- Location within Bosnia and Herzegovina
- Coordinates: 43°49′18″N 18°22′06″E
- Country: Bosnia and Herzegovina
- entity: Republika Srpska
- City: Istočno Sarajevo
- Municipality: Istočno Novo Sarajevo

Area
  - Total: 6.58 km^{2} (2.54 sq mi)

Population (2013)
  - Total: 7.785
  - Density: 1.18/km^{2} (3.06/sq mi)
- Time zone: UTC+1 (CET)
  - Summer (DST): UTC+2 (CEST)
- Area code: +387(0)57

Lukavica (Serbian Cyrillic: Лукавица) is an urban neighborhood of the city of Istočno Sarajevo, Republika Srpska, Bosnia and Herzegovina. The administrative, business, cultural and sports center of the Istočno Sarajevo. It is located in municipality of Istočno Novo Sarajevo and administratively distinguished between Lukavica-Center and Lukavica. It is urban area of the Istočno Sarajevo and suburban part of the Sarajevo.

== History ==
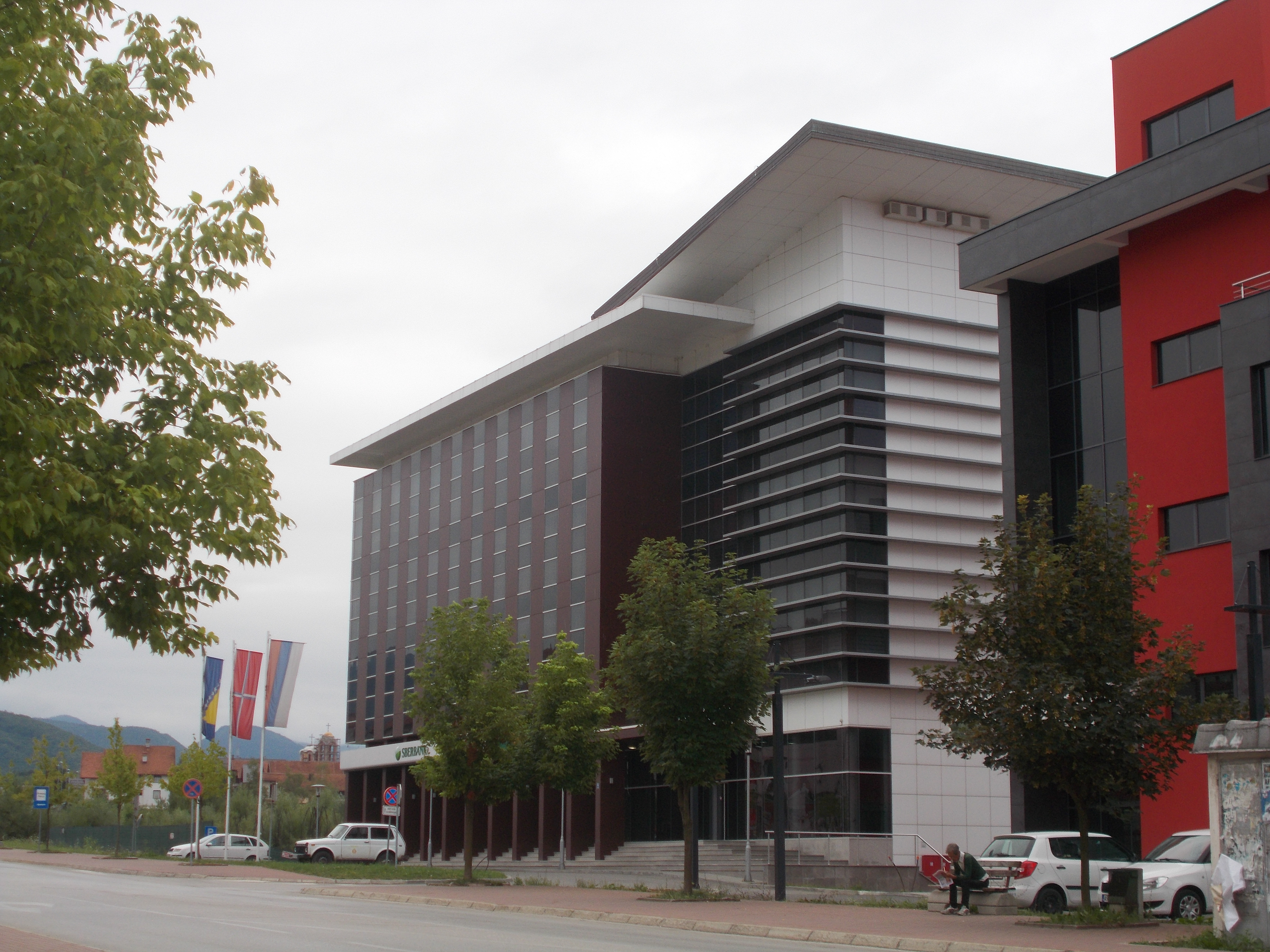
Istočno Sarajevo City Administration building is located in Lukavica

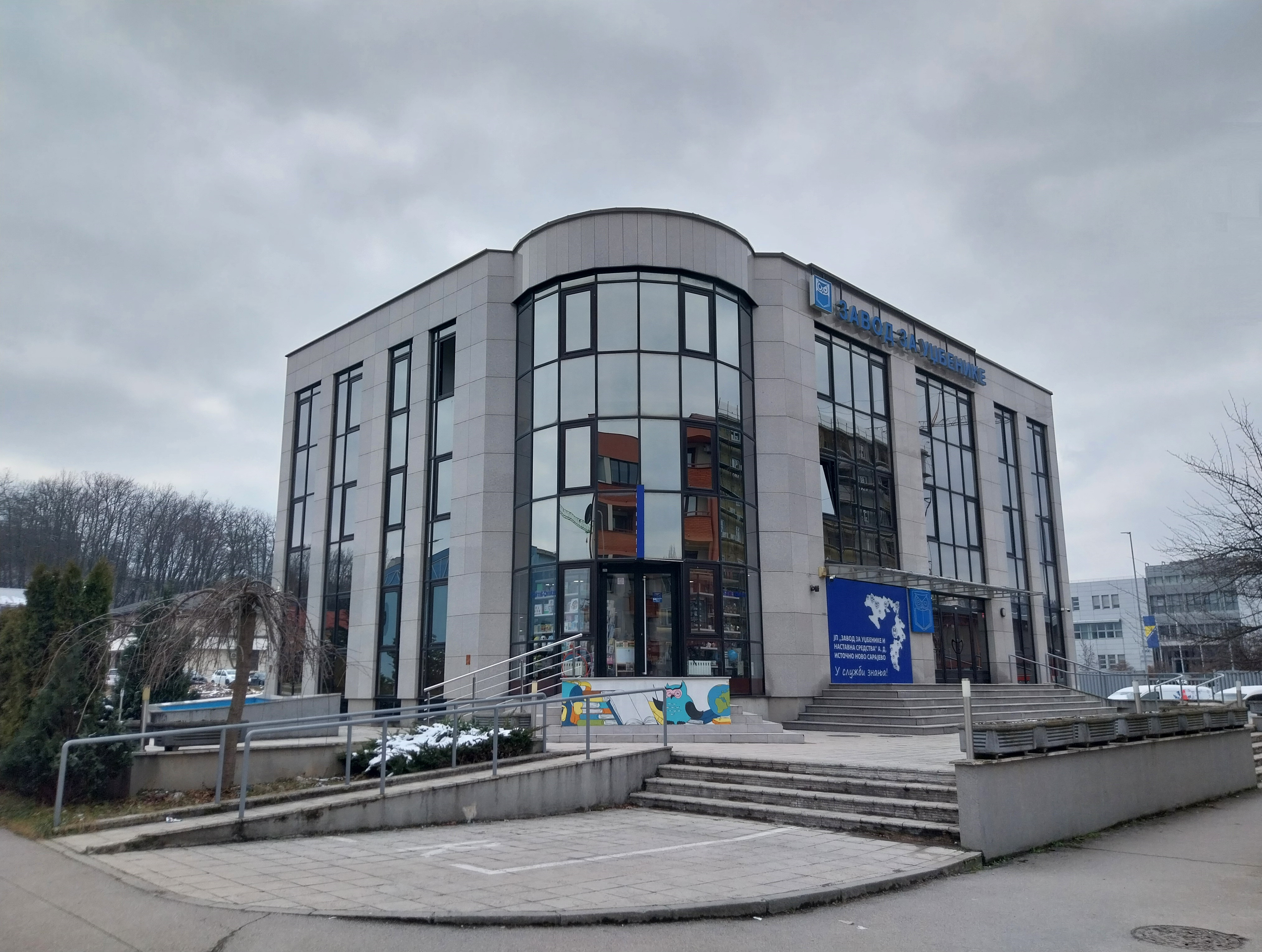
Institute for Textbooks and Teaching Aids of the Republika Srpska is located in Lukavica

Lukavica is located 8 kilometers south-west of the center of Sarajevo (Baščaršija). Until 1992, it was part of Novo Sarajevo municipality. Since 1992 and the Bosnian War, neighbourhood has been part of the municipality of Istočno Novo Sarajevo (formerly known as Srpska opština Novo Sarajevo and Srpsko Novo Sarajevo).

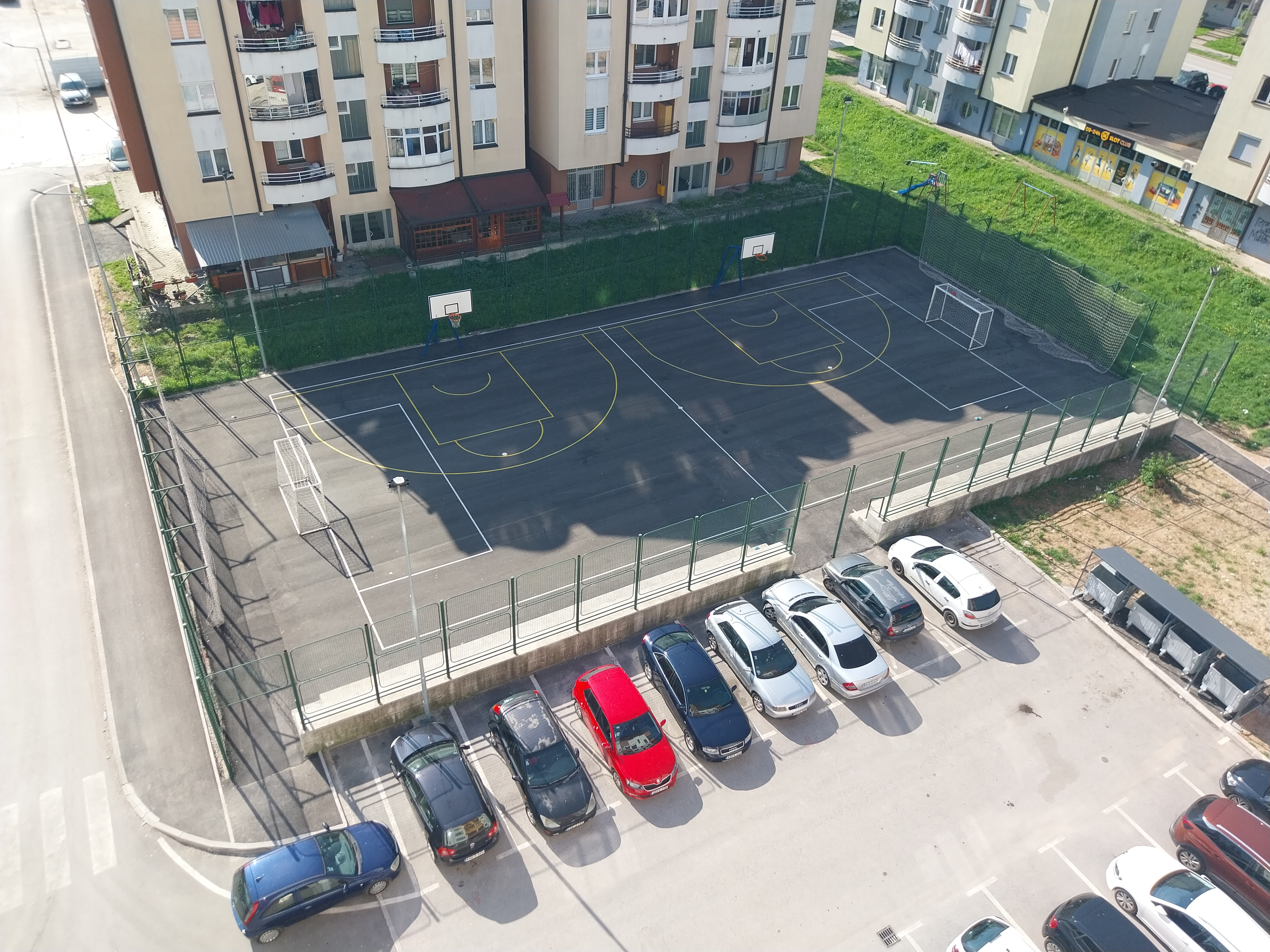
Playground in Karađorđeva Street in Lukavica

In socialist period, Lukavica was famous military place in Sarajevo. There were located bases of Yugoslav People's Army. Military base "Slaviša Vajner Čiča" i military base "Slobodan Princip Seljo". During the Bosnian War used by Army of Republika Srpska. In May 1992, the President of the Presidency of the Republic of Bosnia and Herzegovina Alija Izetbegović was kidnapped from Sarajevo International Airport. He was taken to the "Slobodan Princip Seljo" military base in Lukavica, and the news of his kidnapping was shockingly announced live during Dnevnik on TV BiH. Military base "Slobodan Princip Seljo" was damaged during the 1995 NATO bombing of Republika Srpska.

Now, in building of the "Slobodan Princip Seljo" military base is Rectorate building of the University of Istočno Sarajevo. Building of the second military base was reconstructed to public dormitory. Other military buildings were demolished and in those places build new residential apartments.

Lukavica is urban neighborhood and homeplace of most institutions of the City of Istočno Sarajevo. There are located four faculties of the University of Istočno Sarajevo. Also, National Theatre, City Administration building, the natural gas transportation and distribution company, the heating plant and the water supply company of the Istočno Sarajevo are also located in the Lukavica. There is also the headquarters of the State Investigation and Protection Agency (SIPA), as well as the Institute for Textbooks and Teaching Aids of the Republika Srpska. It is known for its green spaces. The parks such like Princip, Sunce and Park Velikana make the neighborhood recognizable.

Most of Lukavica lies east of the inter-entity boundary line, in the territory of Republika Srpska. Only its western parts are in the territory of Federation of Bosnia and Herzegovina, in the municipality of Novo Sarajevo.

== Neighborhoods ==
Being scattered, Lukavica has many sub-neighborhoods, like Naselje Slobode, Naselje Tat and Vranješ. Some of streets such like Nikola Tesla Street and Karađorđeva Street are neighborhood for itself.

Unlike Sarajevo's neighborhoods, these are not real neighbourhoods of buildings in either architectonic or geographical form, simply named so when they were constructed as the neighborhoods didn't exist and had no previous, historical names.

== Notable residents ==
- Mirko Šarović, politician
- Ljubiša Ćosić, politician

== Demographics ==
Lukavica
year of census	2013	1991	1981	1971
Serbs	7,440 (95.6%)	1,353 (73.21%)	1,137 (81.21%)	1,004 (85.22%)
Bosniaks	39 (0,5%)	370 (20.02%)	95 (6.78%)	86 (7.30%)
Croats	91 (1.2%)	19 (1.02%)	37 (2.64%)	73 (6.19%)
Yugoslavs	-	47 (2.54%)	94 (6.71%)	4 (0.33%)
Others	215 (2,8%)	59 (3.19%)	37 (2.64%)	11 (0.93%)
total	7,785	1,848	1,400	1,178

== Gallery ==
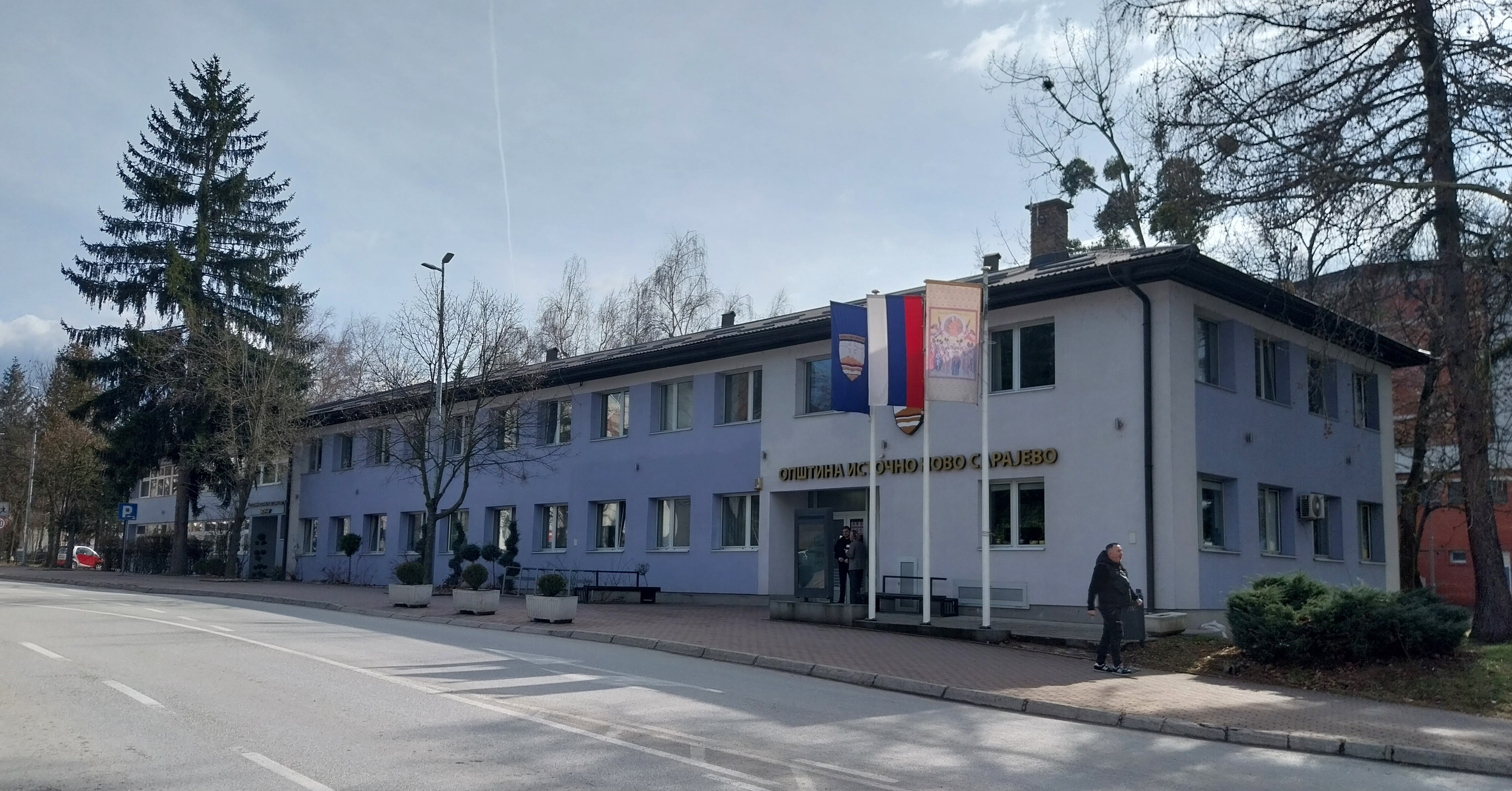
Municipality Building of Istočno Novo Sarajevo

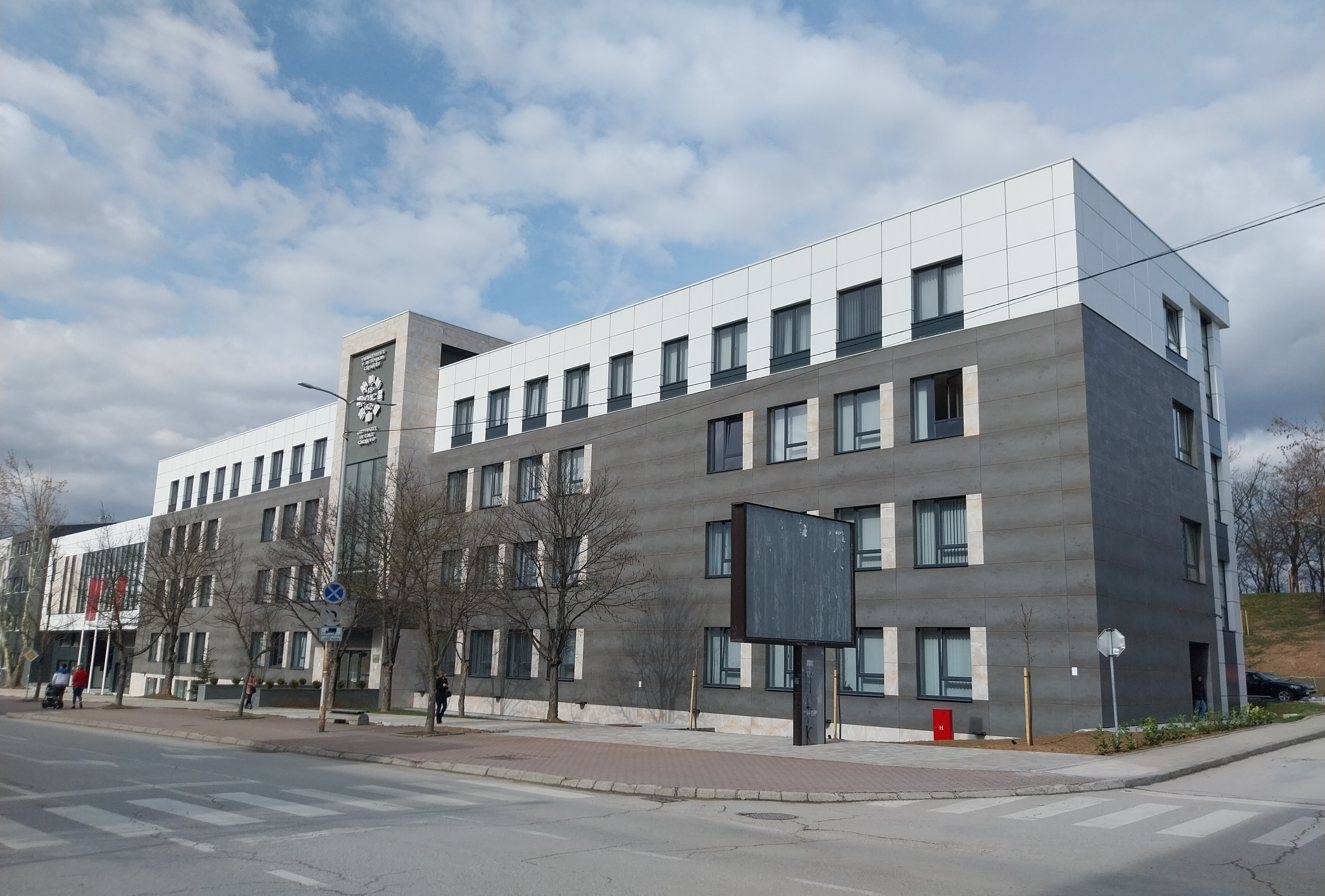
Rectorate of the University of Istočno Sarajevo

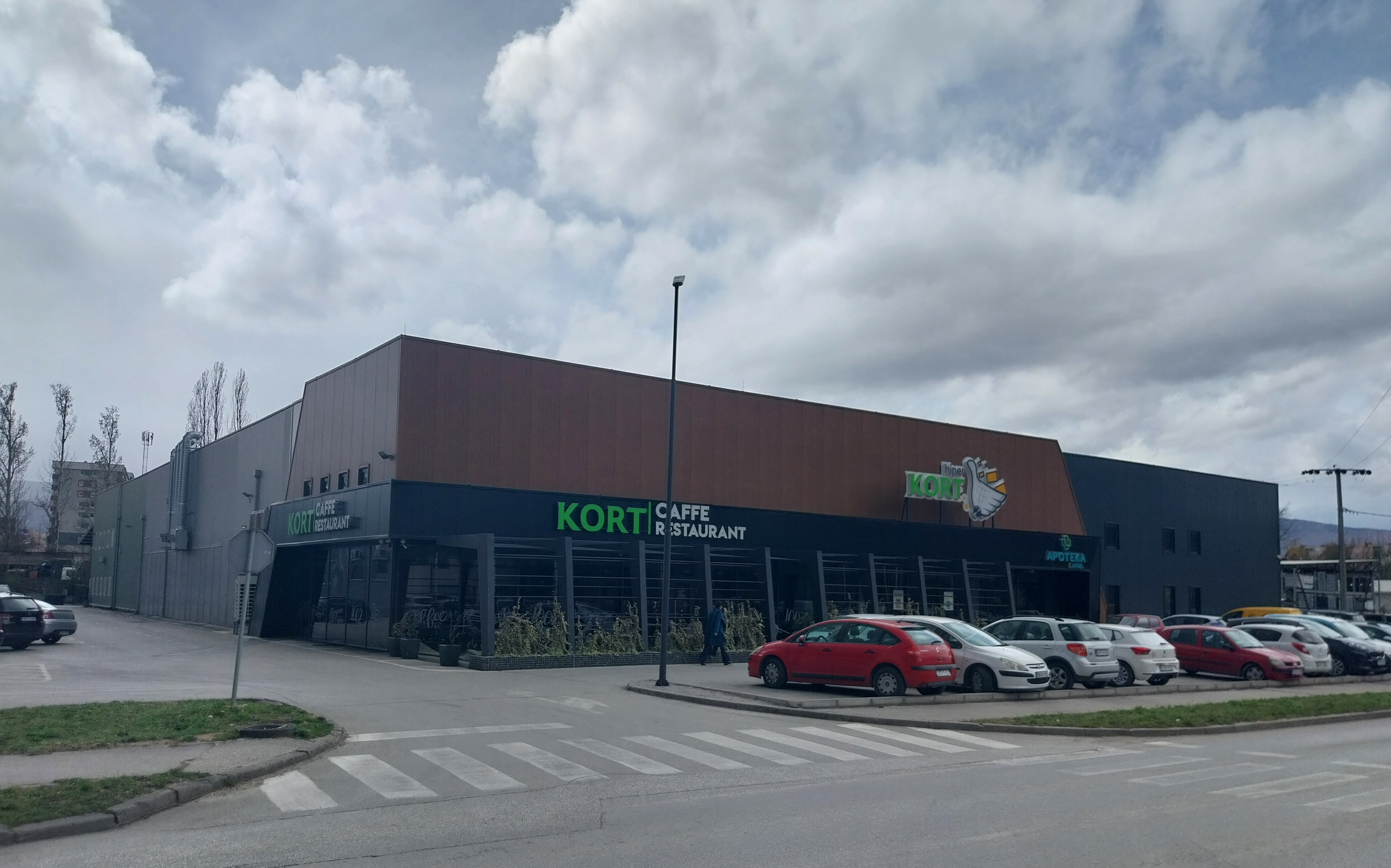
Hiper Kort Market

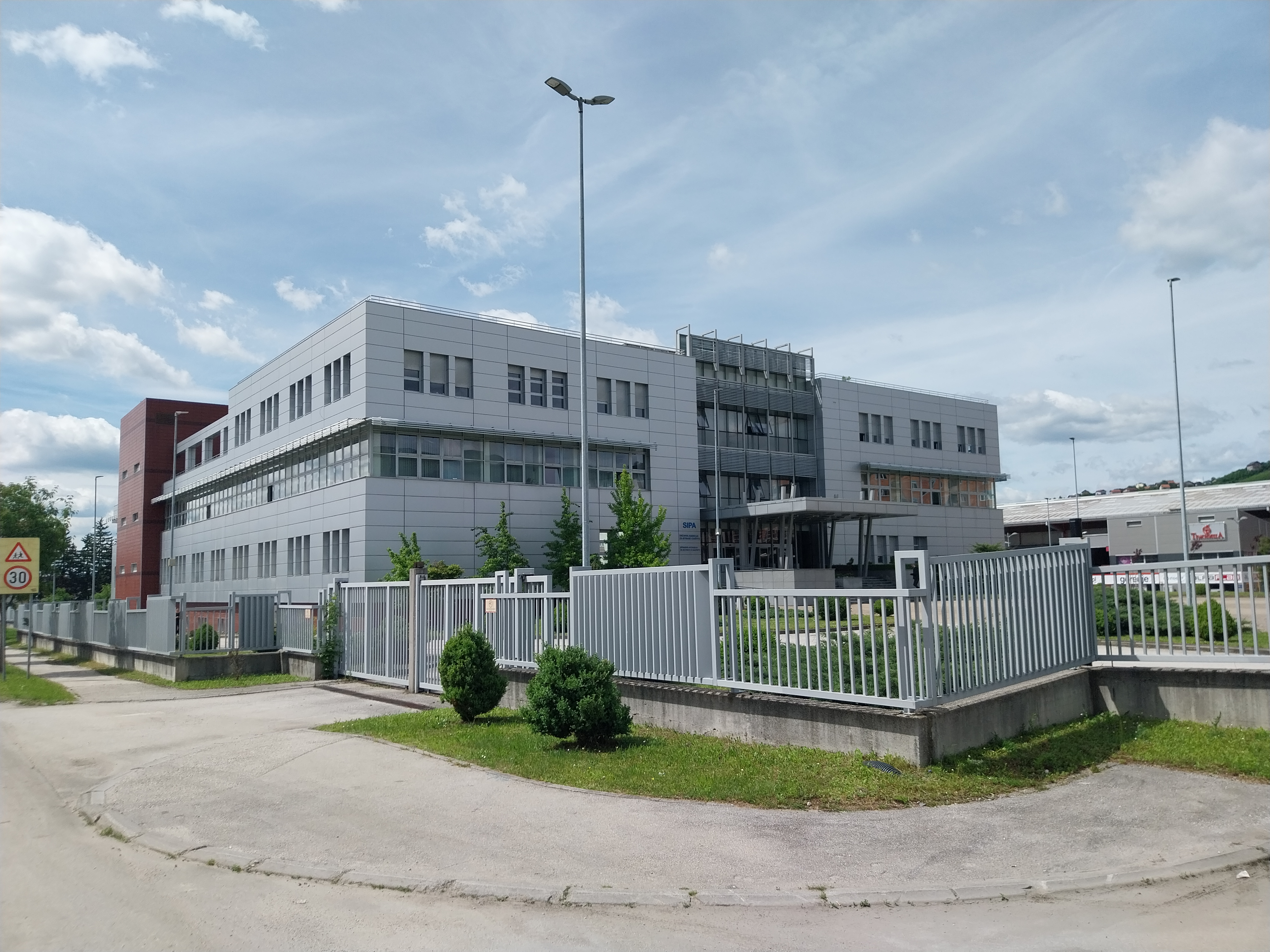
SIPA
