= Nišić =

Nišić is a South Slavic surname. Its bearers are ethnic Serbs, Croats and Bosniaks.

Bearers of the surname live mostly in Bosnia and Herzegovina (Sarajevo, Kasindo and Toplik in East Sarajevo, Šipovo, Olovo, etc.), and in Croatia (Zagreb, Karlovac, Varaždin, etc.), Montenegro (Nikšić, Cetinje, Jabuke), Serbia (Belgrade), Western Europe, United States and Canada.

It may refer to:

- Ermina Nišić - Bosnian actress
- Jovan Nišić (born 1998), Serbian footballer
- Nedim Nišić (born 1984), Bosnian-American swimmer who represented Bosnia and Herzegovina at the 2008 Olympic games.
- Radovan Nišić - Croatian architect
- Tatjana Nišić- Serbian and Bosnian politician

== See also ==
- Nišići, village located near Sarajevo.

== Sources ==
- Stara Crna Gora, Jovan Erdeljanovic, Slovo ljubve, Beograd
- Đorđe Janjatović, Prezimena Srba u Bosni, Sombor, 1993.
