= Kozarevići =

Kozarevići Козаревићи
- Village
- Location within Bosnia and Herzegovina
- Coordinates: 43°49′02″N 18°24′52″E
- Country: Bosnia and Herzegovina
- Entity: Republika Srpska
- Municipality: Istočno Novo Sarajevo
- Time zone: UTC+1 (CET)
  - Summer (DST): UTC+2 (CEST)

Kozarevići (Serbian: Козаревићи) is a village in Bosnia and Herzegovina. According to the 2013 census, it had a population of 413 inhabitants. The village is located in the municipality of Istočno Novo Sarajevo.
