= Tvrdimići =

Tvrdimići Тврдимићи
- Village
- Location within Bosnia and Herzegovina
- Coordinates: 43°47′N 18°27′E
- Country: Bosnia and Herzegovina
- Entity: Republika Srpska
- Municipality: Istočno Novo Sarajevo
- Time zone: UTC+1 (CET)
  - Summer (DST): UTC+2 (CEST)

Tvrdimići (Serbian: Тврдимићи) is a village in Bosnia and Herzegovina. According to the 2013 census, it had a population of 18 inhabitants. The village is located in the municipality of Istočno Novo Sarajevo.
