= Miljevići, Istočno Novo Sarajevo =

Miljevići Миљевићи
- Village
- Location within Bosnia and Herzegovina
- Coordinates: 43°50′09″N 18°24′36″E
- Country: Bosnia and Herzegovina
- Entity: Republika Srpska
- Region: Istočno Sarajevo
- Municipality: Istočno Novo Sarajevo

Area
  - Total: 1.19 sq mi (3.09 km^{2})

Population (2013)
  - Total: 1,281
  - Density: 1,070/sq mi (415/km^{2})
- Time zone: UTC+1 (CET)
  - Summer (DST): UTC+2 (CEST)

Miljevići (Serbian Cyrillic: Миљевићи) is a village in the municipality of Istočno Novo Sarajevo, Bosnia and Herzegovina. According to the 2013 census, it had a population of 1,281 inhabitants.

== Population ==
Miljevići
year of census	1991.	1981.	1971.
Serbs	985 (94,25%)	846 (90,96%)	624 (92,17%)
Muslims	25 (2,39%)	16 (1,72%)	28 (4,13%)
Croats	12 (1,14%)	3 (0,32%)	13 (1,92%)
Yugoslavs	14 (1,33%)	59 (6,34%)	0
others and unknown	9 (0,86%)	6 (0,64%)	12 (1,77%)
total	1.045	930	677

Ethnicity in 2013
Ethnicity	Number	Percentage
Serbs	1,264	98.7%
Croats	9	0.7%
Bosniaks	2	0.2%
other/undeclared	6	0.5%
Total	1,281	100%
