= List of mayors of Istočno Sarajevo =

Mayor of Istočno Sarajevo
- Gradonačelnik Istočnog Sarajeva
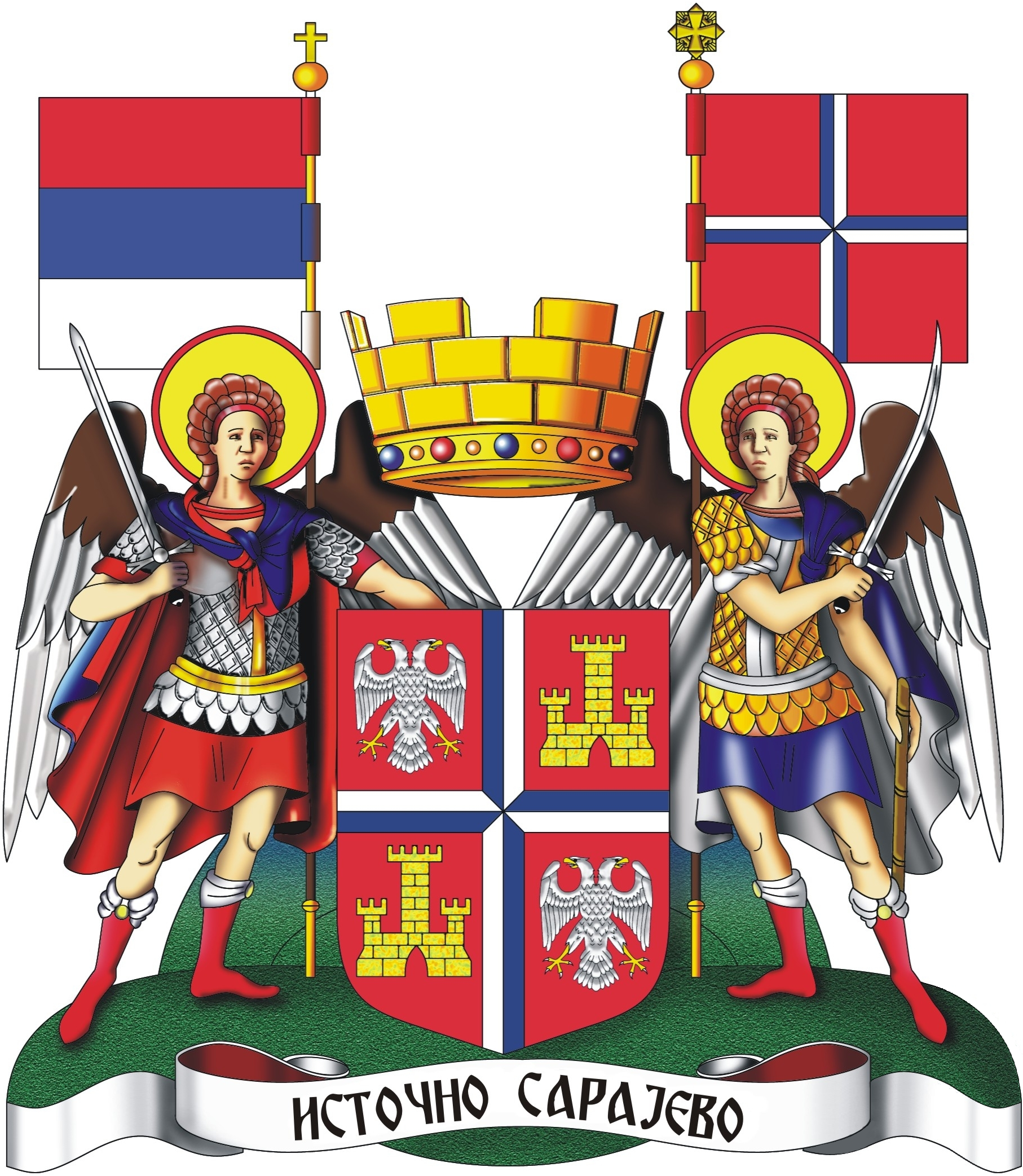
- The Coat of arms of Istočno Sarajevo
- Incumbent; Ljubiša Ćosić since 2020
- Seat: City Administration building, Istočno Sarajevo
- Appointer: Assembly of the City of Istočno Sarajevo
- Term length: Four years, renewable
- Inaugural holder: Mirko Šarović
- Formation: 1997
- Website: City of Istočno Sarajevo website

This is a list of people who have served as mayor or president of the Assembly of the City of Istočno Sarajevo, a city in Bosnia and Herzegovina. Istočno Sarajevo has had eight different mayors since the position was created in 1997, after the Bosnian War.

== Responsibilities ==
The role of the mayor is to represent the City, establish the City Administration, manage its work and be responsible for its work. The duties of the mayor are defined by the Law on Local Self-Government of Republika Srpska and the Law on the City of Istočno Sarajevo.

== Mayors ==
Serb Democratic Party Party of Democratic Progress Alliance of Independent Social Democrats

Portrait	Name (Birth–Death)	Term of office		Political party
Portrait	Name (Birth–Death)	Took office	Left office	Political party
1	Mirko Šarović (b. 1956)	1997	1999	SDS
2	Predrag Lasica (1955–2003)	2000	2003	SDS
3	Milivoje Gutalj	2003	2005	SDS
4	Radivoje Kezunović (b. 1950)	2005	2009	SDS
5	Vinko Radovanović (1957–2021)	2009	2013	PDP
6	Nenad Samardžija (b. 1958)	2013	2017	SDS
7	Nenad Vuković (b. 1978)	6 February 2017	2020	PDP
8	Ljubiša Ćosić (b. 1979)	2020	Incumbent	SNSD
