= Sarajevo-Dio Novog Sarajeva =

Sarajevo-Dio Novog Sarajeva Сарајево-Дио Новог Сарајева
- Town
- Location within Bosnia and Herzegovina
- Coordinates: 43°50′21″N 18°23′24″E
- Country: Bosnia and Herzegovina
- Entity: Republika Srpska
- Region: East Sarajevo
- Municipality: Istočno Novo Sarajevo

Area
  - Total: 0.14 sq mi (0.35 km^{2})

Population (2013)
  - Total: 84
  - Density: 620/sq mi (240/km^{2})
- Time zone: UTC+1 (CET)
  - Summer (DST): UTC+2 (CEST)

Sarajevo-Dio Novog Sarajeva (Serbian Cyrillic: Сарајево-Дио Новог Сарајева) is a village in the municipality of Istočno Novo Sarajevo, Republika Srpska.

== Demographics ==
According to the 2013 census, its population was 84.

Ethnicity in 2013
Ethnicity	Number	Percentage
Serbs	81	96.4%
Croats	1	1.2%
other/undeclared	2	2.4%
Total	84	100%
