= Toplik =

Toplik Топлик
- Village
- Location within Bosnia and Herzegovina
- Coordinates: 43°51′N 18°34′E
- Country: Bosnia and Herzegovina
- Entity: Republika Srpska
- Municipality: Istočno Novo Sarajevo
- Time zone: UTC+1 (CET)
  - Summer (DST): UTC+2 (CEST)

Toplik (Serbian: Топлик) is a village in Bosnia and Herzegovina. According to the 2013 census, it had a population of 644 inhabitants. The village is located in the municipality of Istočno Novo Sarajevo.
