= Ljubiša Ćosić =

Bosnian Serb politician

8th Mayor of Istočno Sarajevo
- Incumbent
- Assumed office 2020
- Preceded by: Nenad Vuković

Mayor of Istočno Novo Sarajevo
- In office 2012–2020
- Preceded by: Gojko Drašković
- Succeeded by: Jovan Katić

Personal details
- Born: 2 October 1979 (age 46) Sarajevo, SR Bosnia and Herzegovina, SFR Yugoslavia
- Party: SNSD

Ljubiša Ćosić (Serbian Cyrillic: Љубиша Ћосић; born 2 October 1979) is a Bosnian Serb politician serving as the 8th mayor of Istočno Sarajevo. He previously served as the municipal mayor of Istočno Novo Sarajevo from 2012 to 2020. He is member of the Alliance of Independent Social Democrats (SNSD).

Ćosić has a master's degree in economics and is a PhD student at the University of Banja Luka. Ćosić worked as interpreter for the OSCE, and as intern at the Parliamentary Assembly of Bosnia and Herzegovina and at the National Democratic Institute in Washington, DC. He then worked for the Sarajevo Regional Development Agency (SERDA, 2004–06) and the State Investigation and Protection Agency of BiH (SIPA, 2006–08). He served as an advisor to the Minister of Foreign Trade and Economic Relations of Bosnia and Herzegovina Mladen Zirojević (SNSD, 2008–11), and as an advisor for economic issues to the Serb member of the Presidency of Bosnia and Herzegovina, Nebojša Radmanović (SNSD, 2011–12).

Ćosić was elected mayor of the municipality of Istočno Novo Sarajevo in 2012 and 2016. Since March 2017, he is President of the Association of Municipalities and Cities of Republika Srpska. In October 2020, at the first direct elections for the post, he was elected Mayor of the City of Istočno Sarajevo.
