= Istočno Novo Sarajevo =

Municipality in Bosnia and Herzegovina

Istočno Novo Sarajevo Источно Ново Сарајево East New Sarajevo
- Municipality
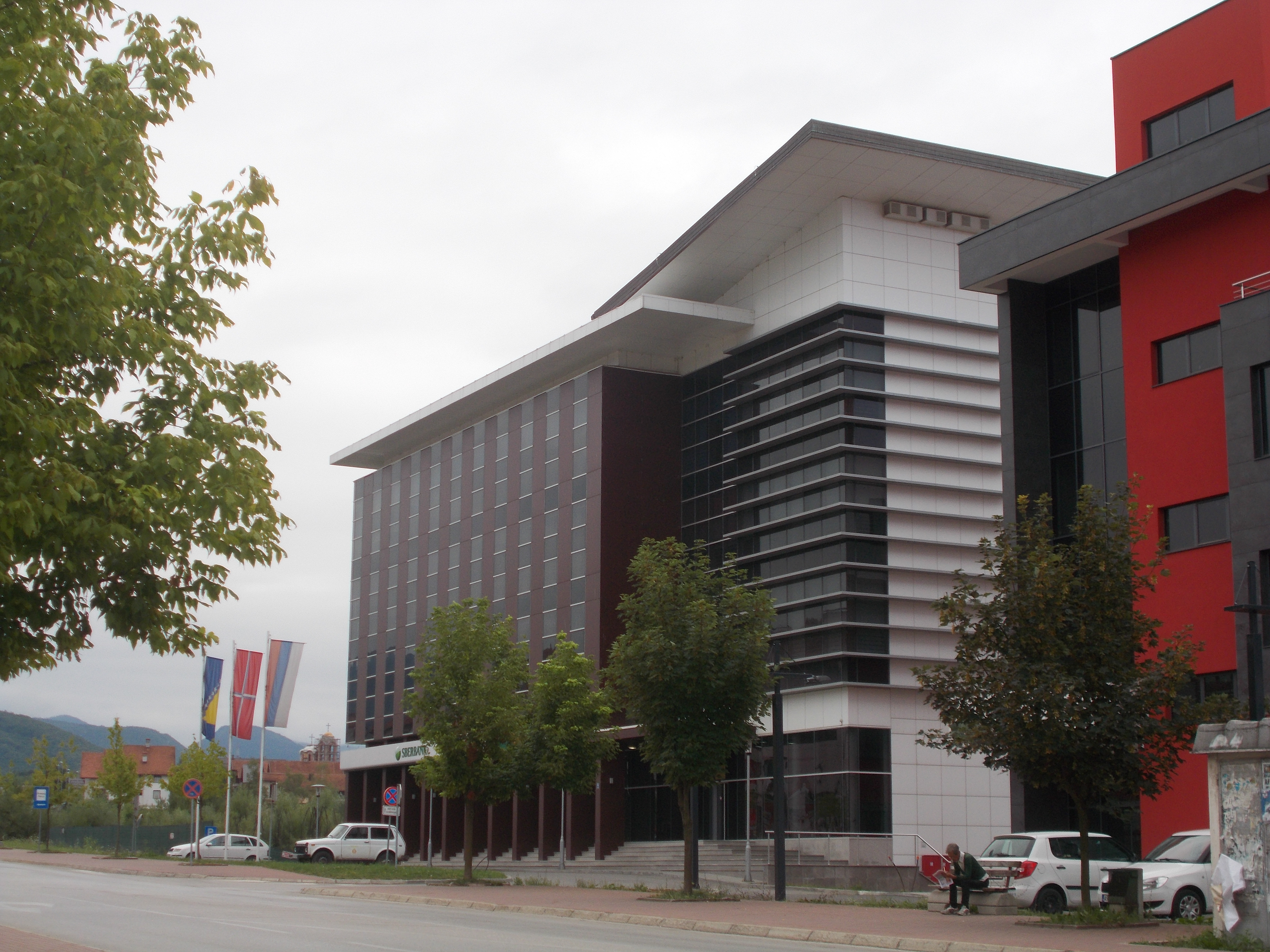
- Istočno Sarajevo City Administration building is located in Istočno Novo Sarajevo

- Coat of arms

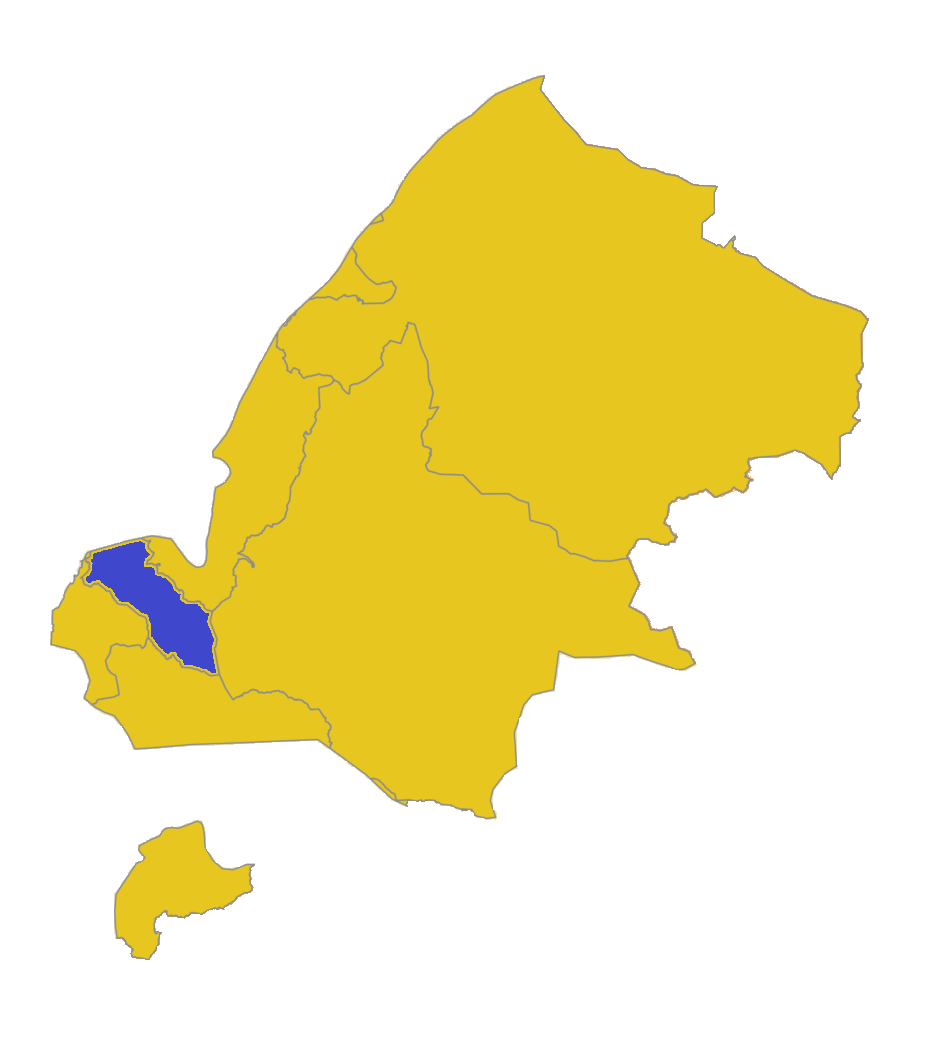
- Location of Istočno Novo Sarajevo within the city of Istočno Sarajevo
- Coordinates: 43°49′12″N 18°21′33″E
- Country: Bosnia and Herzegovina
- Entity: Republika Srpska
- City: Istočno Sarajevo
- Status: Urban
- Founded: 1992; 34 years ago

Government
  - Municipal mayor: Jovan Katić (SNSD)

Area
  - Total: 34.69 km^{2} (13.39 sq mi)

Population (2013 census)
  - Total: 10,642
  - Density: 3,308/km^{2} (8,570/sq mi)
- Time zone: UTC+1 (CET)
  - Summer (DST): UTC+2 (CEST)
- Postal code: 71123
- Area code: +387 57
- Website: www.opstinains.net

Istočno Novo Sarajevo (Serbian Cyrillic: Источно Ново Сарајево, lit. East New Sarajevo) is a municipality of the city of Istočno Sarajevo, Republika Srpska, Bosnia and Herzegovina. It is the suburban part of Sarajevo, estimated that in 2022 it had a population of 12,552 inhabitants. The seat of the municipality is the neighborhood of Lukavica, where as well located many institutions of the city of Istočno Sarajevo.

== History ==
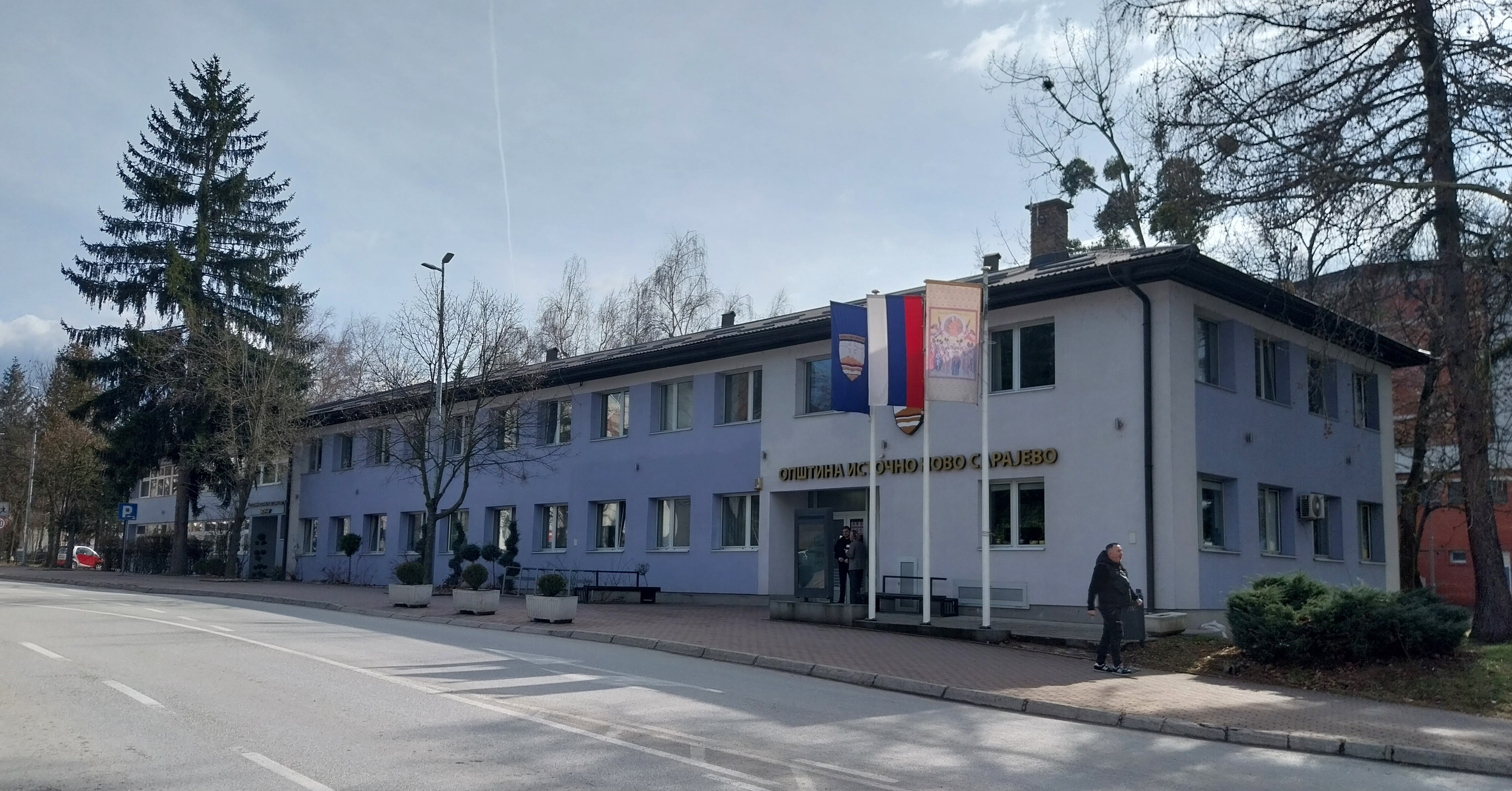
Municipality Building of Istočno Novo Sarajevo

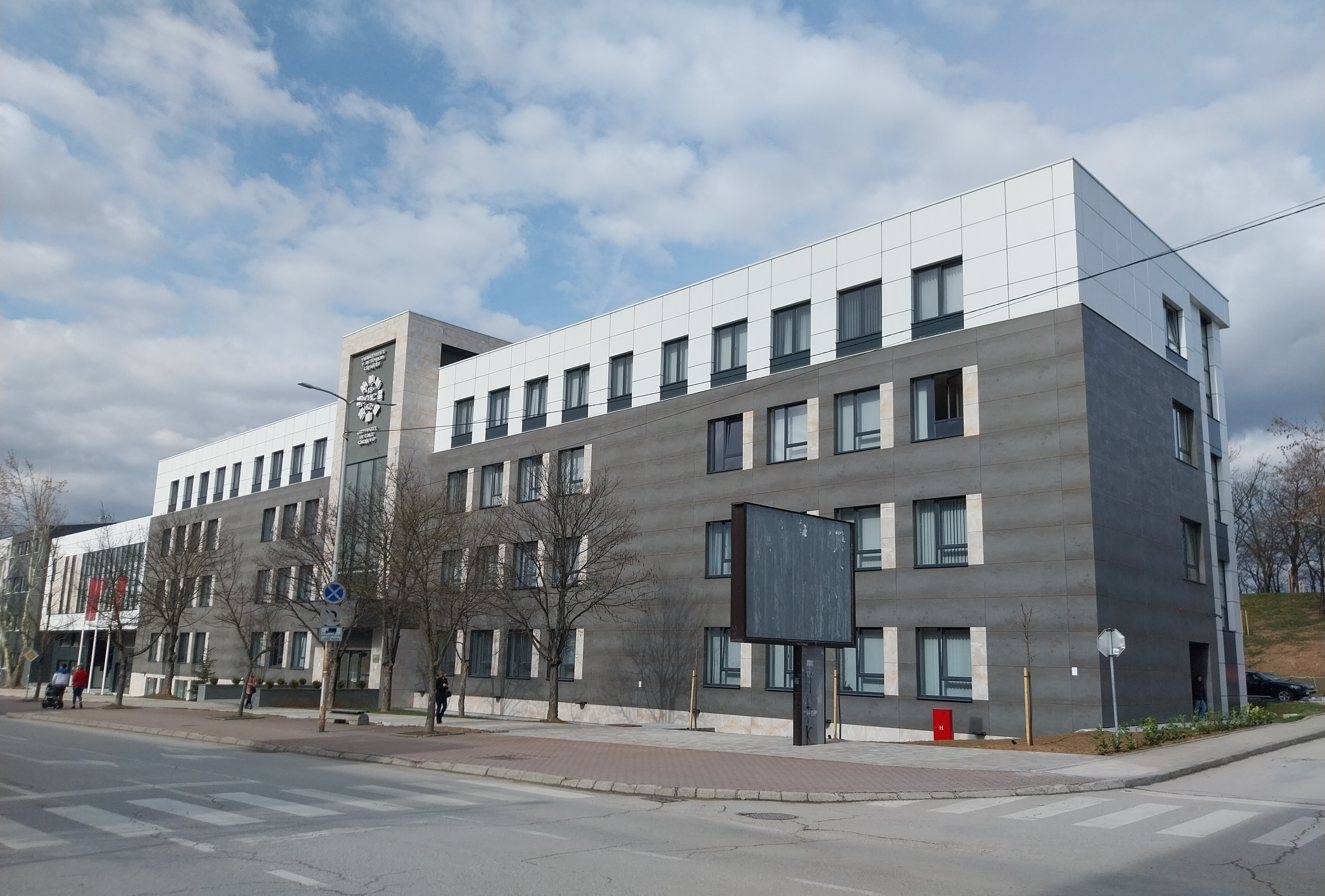
Rectorate of the University of Istočno Sarajevo is located in Istočno Novo Sarajevo

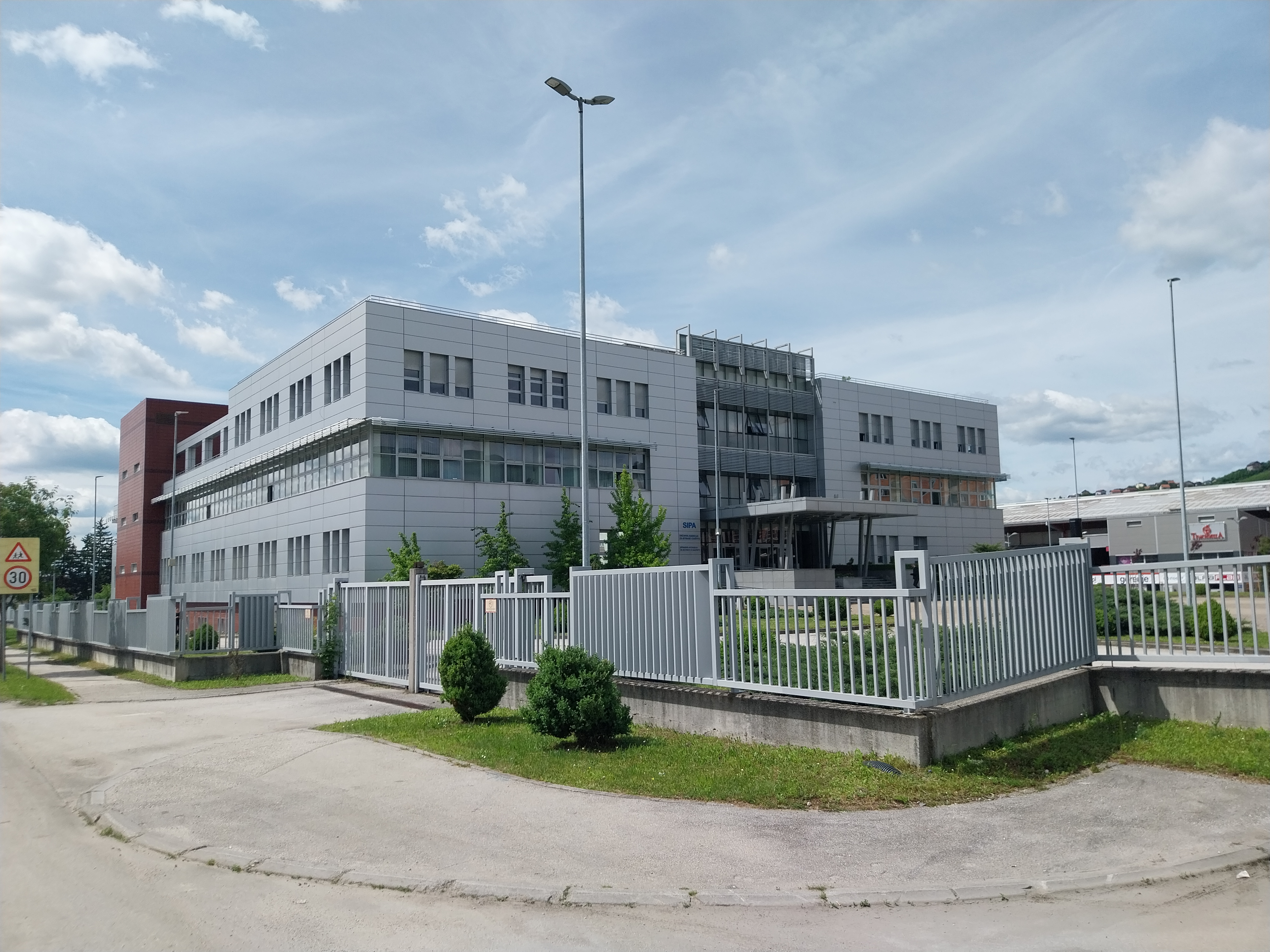
Headquarters of the State Investigation and Protection Agency (SIPA) is located in Istočno Novo Sarajevo

It was created 1992. as the Srpska opština Novo Sarajevo (Serbian Municipality of Novo Sarajevo) from part of the pre-war municipality of Novo Sarajevo (the other part of the pre-war municipality is now in the City of Sarajevo in the Federation of Bosnia and Herzegovina). After the signing of the Dayton Peace Agreement, the municipality changed name to Srpsko Novo Sarajevo (Serbian New Sarajevo). Following the decision on the name of the cities in 2004 by the Constitutional Court of Bosnia and Herzegovina, which outruled the use of the prefix Srpski (Serbian), the municipality 2005 was renamed Istočno Novo Sarajevo (East New Sarajevo). From 2004 to 2005 the municipality was used name Lukavica. With an area of 38 km^{2}, it is territorially among the smallest municipalities in the Bosnia and Herzegovina.

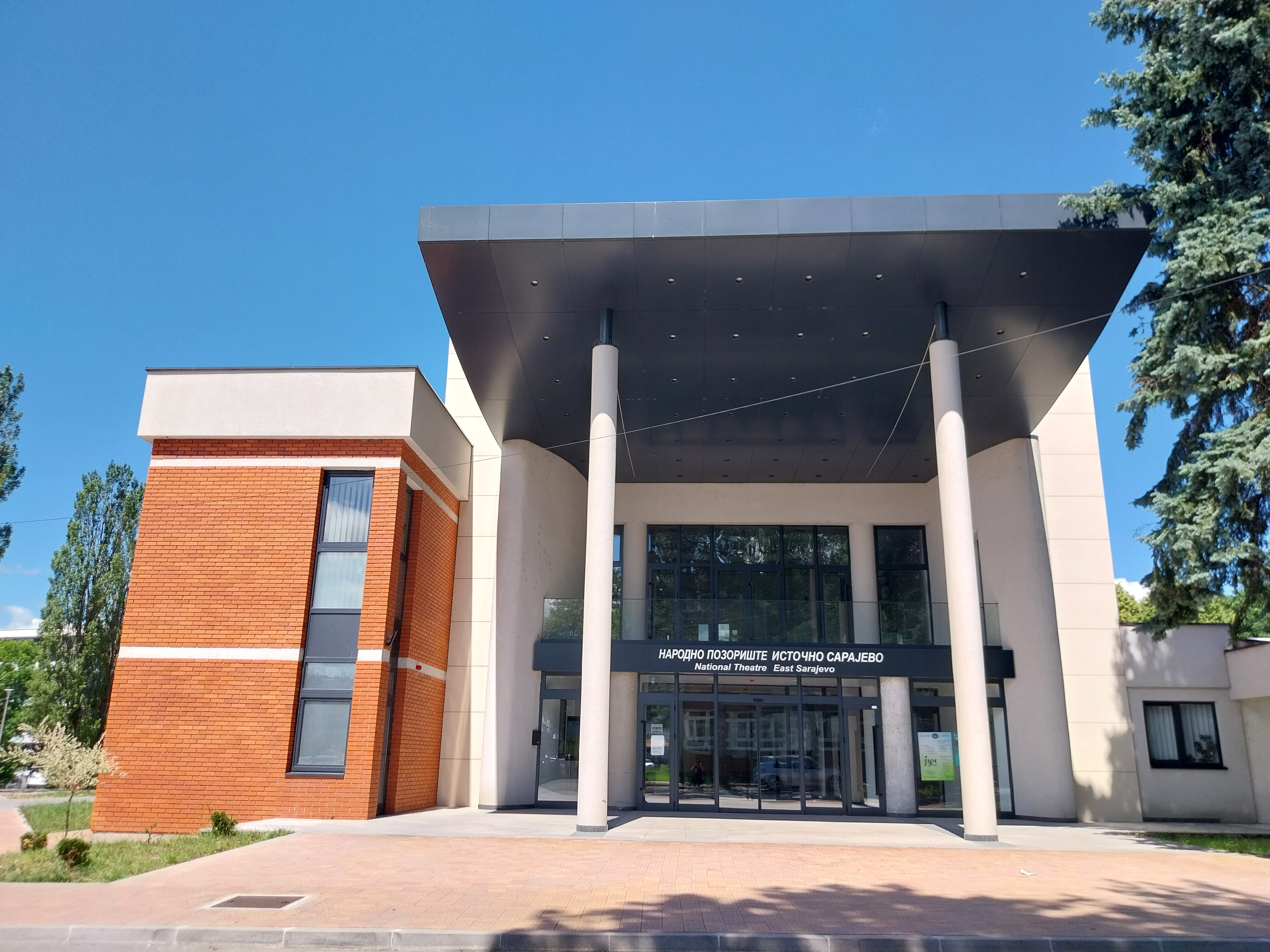
National Theatre Istočno Sarajevo is located in Istočno Novo Sarajevo

In Istočno Novo Sarajevo there is one elementary school "Sveti Sava" (Grades 1–9) and one high school "Srednja stručna škola 28. Juni". Four faculties of the University of Istočno Sarajevo are situated in the municipality: the Faculty of Electrical Engineering, Faculty of Mechanical Engineering, Music Academy and Faculty of Agriculture. The National Theatre Istočno Sarajevo is also located in this municipality. On 27 June 2014, a statue to Gavrilo Princip was inaugurated in Lukavica. The city park (gradski park) was also named after Princip.

The municipality also hosts the headquarters of the State Investigation and Protection Agency (SIPA) and the Institute for Textbooks and Teaching Aids of the Republika Srpska. Istočno Sarajevo City Administration building, the natural gas transportation and distribution company of Istočno Sarajevo, the heating plant and the water supply company of Istočno Sarajevo are also located in the Istočno Novo Sarajevo.

Municipality is one of the most developed municipalities in Republika Srpska. Also, in Bosnia and Herzegovina, Istočno Novo Sarajevo is one of the municipalities with the highest population growth.

The local football club is Slavija that plays in the second League of Bosnia and Herzegovina. Basketball Club Slavija is a basketball club from the Istočno Novo Sarajevo that competes in the National Championship of Bosnia and Herzegovina. Also, Istočno Novo Sarajevo are homeplace of martial arts associations (Jujutsu, Judo, Karate, Kickboxing and Real Aikido)

== Administration ==
=== Settlements ===
The municipality of Istočno Novo Sarajevo consists of six settlements: Lukavica, Lukavica-Center, Miljevići, Petrovići, Vraca and Toplik-Tilava. All institutions of municipality are located in Lukavica.

=== Municipal mayors ===
Municipal mayors were:

- Milivoje Prijić, SDS (1992 — 1993)
- Milorad Katić, SDS (1993 — 1998)
- Milenko Todorović, SDS (1998 — 2000)
- Slavko Tošović, SDS (2000 — 2004)
- Milan Kovačević, SDS (2004 — 2008)
- Gojko Drašković, SDS (2008 — 2012)
- Ljubiša Ćosić, SNSD (2012 — 2020)
- Jovan Katić, SNSD (2020 — present)

== Demographics ==
Ethnic composition of Istočno Novo Sarajevo
year of census	2013	1991
Serbs	10,248 (96.3%)	3,496 (84.8%)
Bosniaks	44 (0.4%)	423 (10.3%)
Croats	107 (1.0%)	43 (1.0%)
Others	243 (2.3%)	160 (3.9%)
total	10,642	4,122

== International cooperation ==
Istočno Novo Sarajevo is twinned with the following cities and municipalities:

- Blace, Serbia
- Čukarica, Serbia
- Ub, Serbia
- Krupanj, Serbia
- Nikšić, Montenegro

== Notable residents ==
- Mirko Šarović, politician
- Ljubiša Ćosić, politician

== Gallery ==
Headquarters of the Sarajevo-gas Istočno Sarajevo

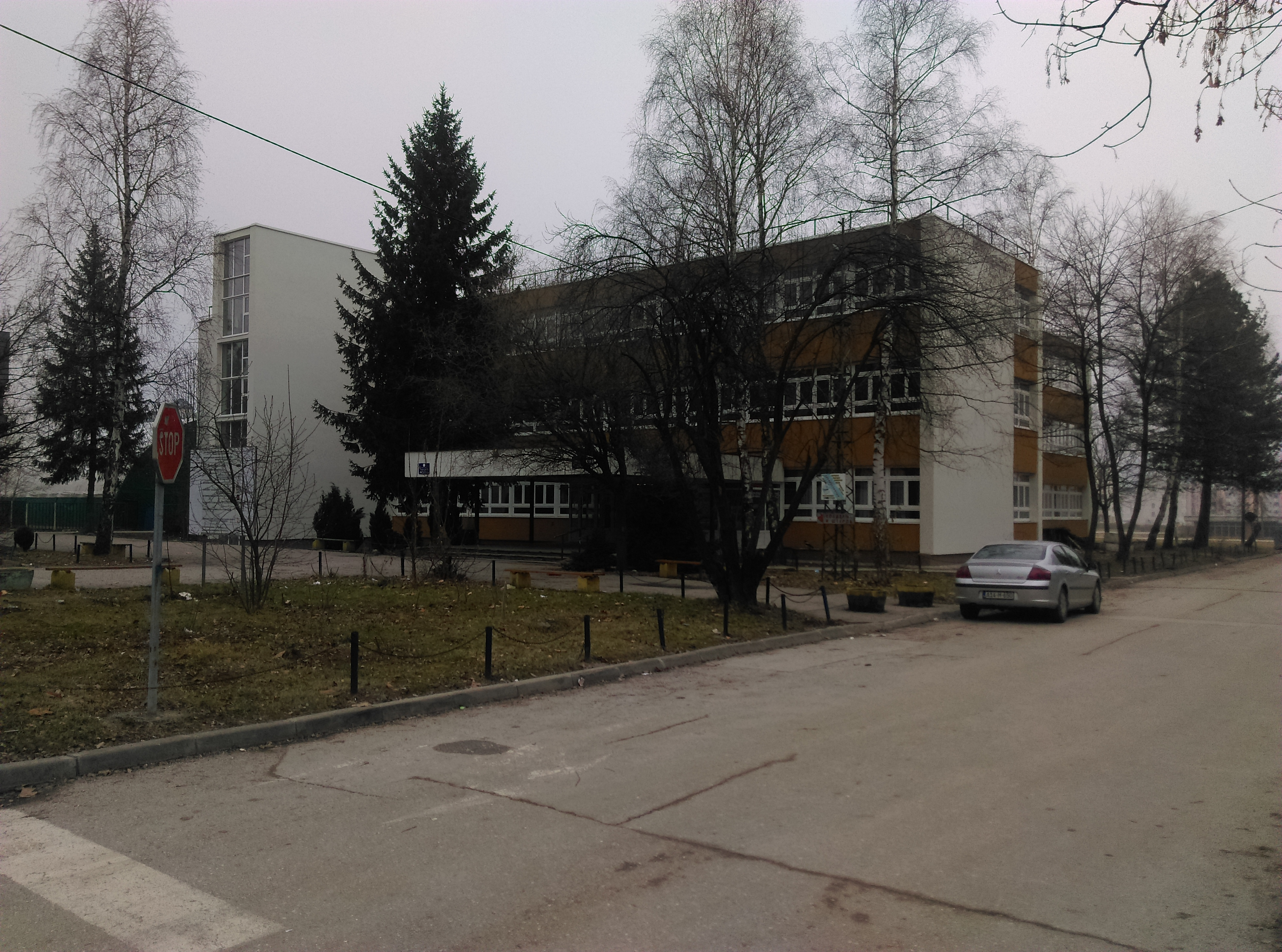
High Schools

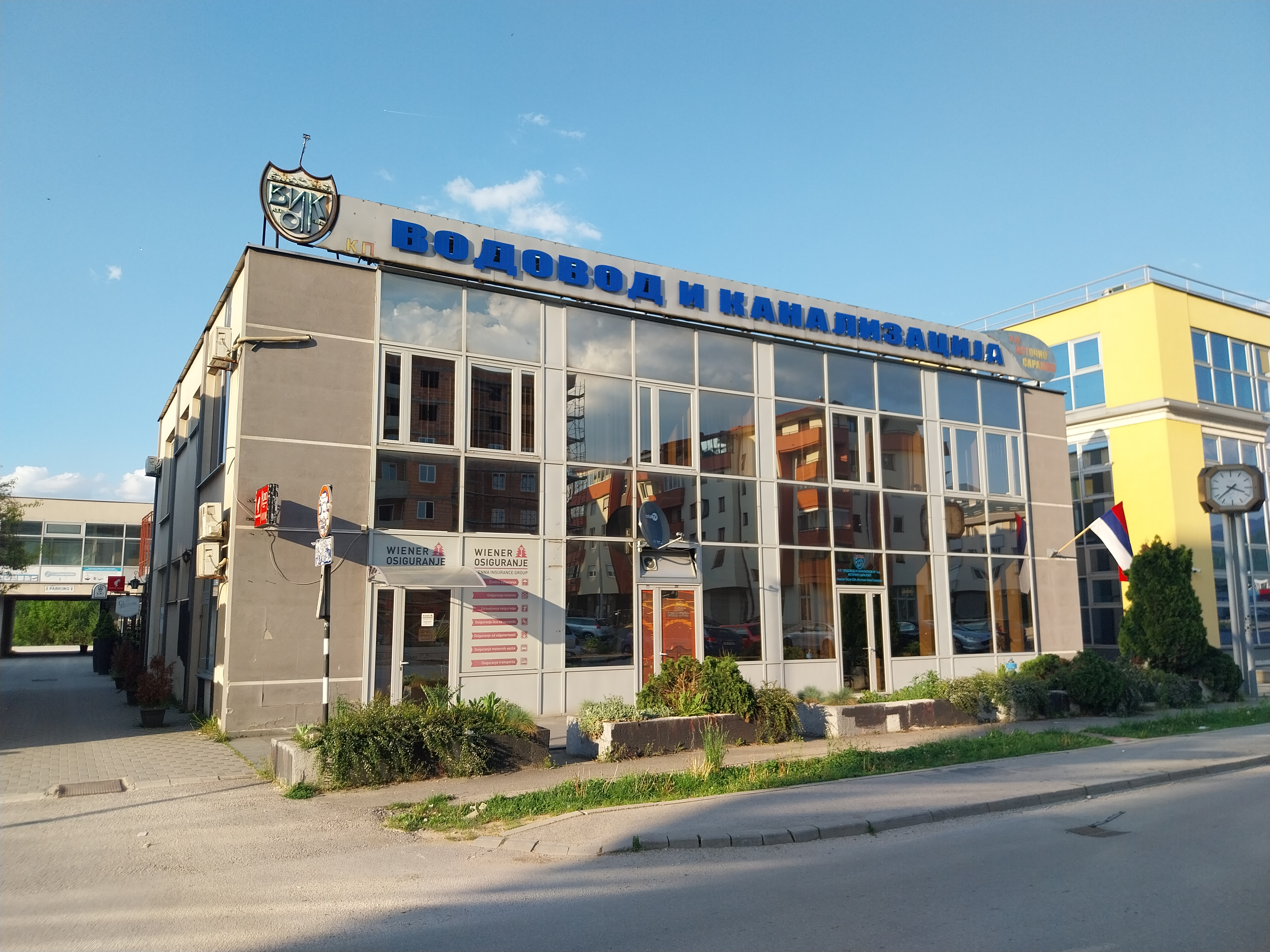
Headquarters of the Water supply and Sewage Istočno Sarajevo

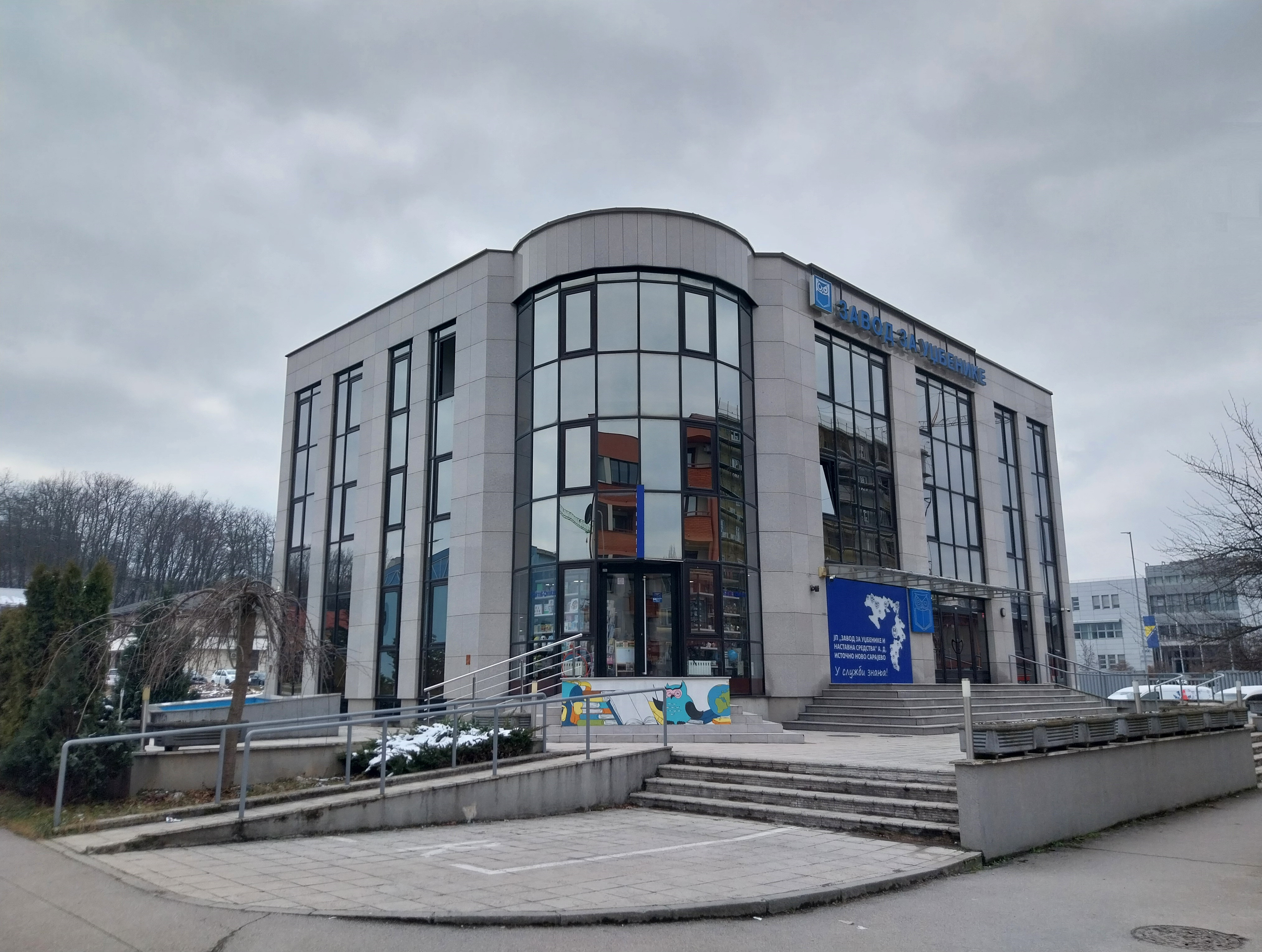
Institute for Textbooks and Teaching Aids

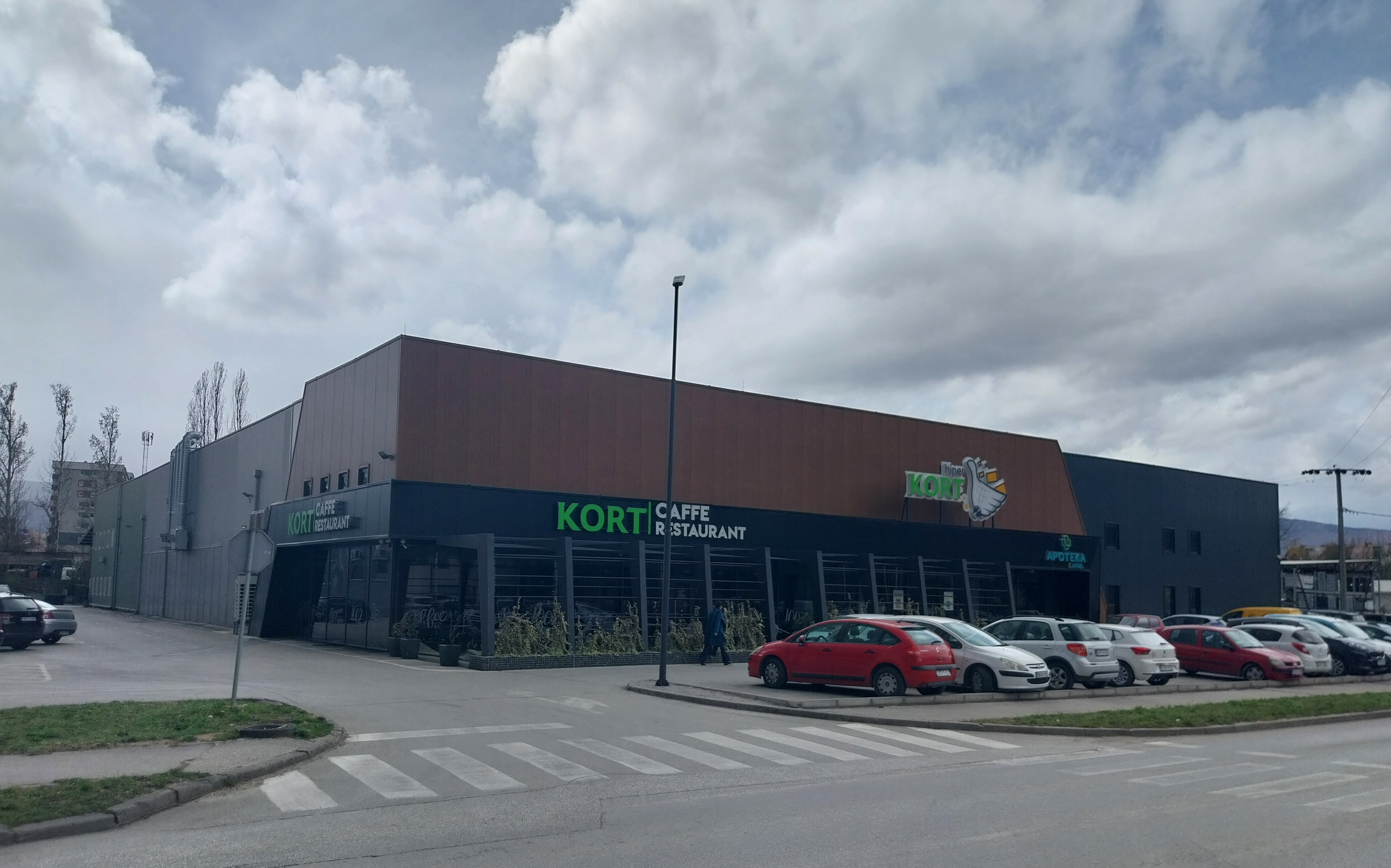
Hiper Kort Market
