= Mirko Šarović =

Bosnian Serb politician (born 1956)

- Мирко Шаровић
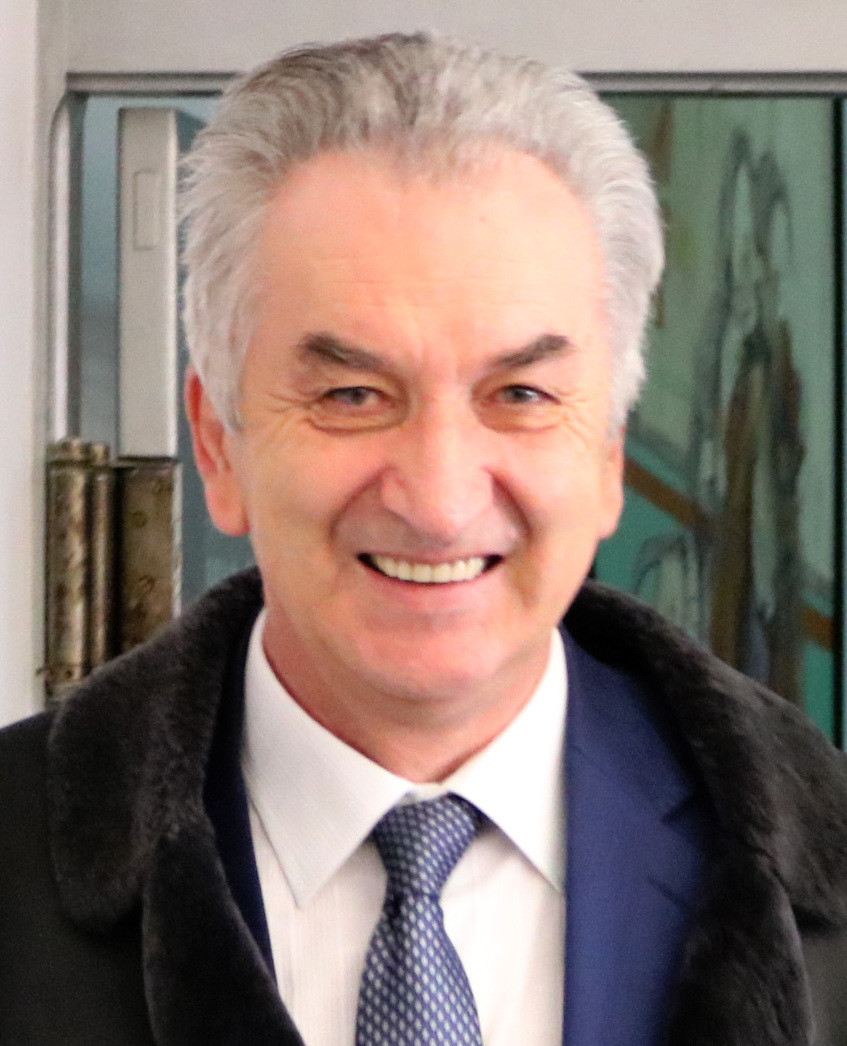
- Šarović in 2018

Chairman of the Presidency of Bosnia and Herzegovina
- In office 28 October 2002 – 2 April 2003
- Preceded by: Beriz Belkić
- Succeeded by: Dragan Čović

Serb member of the Presidency of Bosnia and Herzegovina
- In office 28 October 2002 – 2 April 2003
- Prime Minister: Dragan Mikerević; Adnan Terzić
- Preceded by: Živko Radišić
- Succeeded by: Borislav Paravac

President of Republika Srpska
- In office 26 January 2000 – 28 November 2002
- Vice President: Dragan Čavić
- Preceded by: Petar Đokić (acting)
- Succeeded by: Dragan Čavić
Ministerial offices
Minister of Foreign Trade and Economic Relations
In office 31 March 2015 – 23 December 2019
Prime Minister	Denis Zvizdić
Preceded by	Boris Tučić
Succeeded by	Staša Košarac
In office 12 January 2012 – 24 October 2013
Prime Minister	Vjekoslav Bevanda
Preceded by	Mladen Zirojević
Succeeded by	Boris Tučić
Additional positions
President of the Serb Democratic Party
In office 30 June 2019 – 12 November 2022
Preceded by	Vukota Govedarica
Succeeded by	Milan Miličević

Personal details
- Born: 16 September 1956 (age 70) Rogatica, PR Bosnia and Herzegovina, FPR Yugoslavia
- Party: Serb Democratic Party
- Spouse: Stojanka Šarović (died 2024)
- Children: 2
- Education: University of Sarajevo (LLB)

Mirko Šarović (Serbian Cyrillic: Мирко Шаровић; born 16 September 1956) is a Bosnian Serb politician who served as the Serb member of the Presidency of Bosnia and Herzegovina from 2002 to 2003. From 2000 to 2002, he also served as the president of Republika Srpska and was Minister of Foreign Trade and Economic Relations on two occasions as well.

Born in Rogatica, Šarović graduated from the Faculty of Law at the University of Sarajevo in 1979. Following the Bosnian War in the 1990s, he was elected to the National Assembly of Republika Srpska. In 2000, he became president of Republika Srpska, serving until 2002. In the 2002 general election, Šarović was elected as Serb member of the Bosnian Presidency, serving in office only until 2003, when he resigned amid allegations of his involvement in organising illegal military trading with Iraq. From 2012 to 2013 and again from 2015 to 2019, he served as Minister of Foreign Trade and Economic Relations.

In 2019, Šarović became the new president of the Serb Democratic Party (SDS). In the 2022 general election, he once again ran for a seat in the Presidency as a Serb member, but was not elected. Following the election, Šarović resigned as president of the SDS.

== Early life and education ==
Šarović was born in Rogatica, PR Bosnia and Herzegovina, FPR Yugoslavia on 16 September 1956. He graduated from the Faculty of Law in Sarajevo in 1979. During the 1980s, Šarović was employed in the Engine Factory Sarajevo (Famos) and Unis Sarajevo.

== Career ==
Šarović entered politics before the Bosnian War, as secretary of the municipality of Novo Sarajevo. In one term, he was president of the Executive Board and mayor of Istočno Sarajevo. Šarović was a member of the National Assembly of Republika Srpska for two terms.

As president of Republika Srpska, he signed the historic Agreement on Special Parallel Relations between FR Yugoslavia and Republika Srpska on 5 March 2001 in Banja Luka, together with FR Yugoslavia President Vojislav Koštunica. The Assembly of FR Yugoslavia ratified the signed agreement 10 May 2001. From 28 October 2002 until 2 April 2003, Šarović served as the 3rd Serb member of the Presidency of Bosnia and Herzegovina. He resigned from the Presidency on 2 April 2003 amid allegations of his involvement in organising illegal military trading with Iraq.

Šarović was Minister of Foreign Trade and Economic Relations in the Council of Ministers of Bosnia and Herzegovina on two occasions. On 30 June 2019, he became the new president of the Serb Democratic Party (SDS), succeeding Vukota Govedarica. As president of the SDS, the major opposition party in Republika Srpska, Šarović has been a fierce opponent and critic of Bosnian Serb leader and current Bosnian Presidency member Milorad Dodik, having clashes with him on numerous occasions.

On 23 June 2022, Šarović announced his candidacy in the Bosnian general election, running again for Bosnia and Herzegovina's three-person Presidency member, representing the Serbs. In the general election however, held on 2 October 2022, he was not elected, obtaining 35.45% of the vote, with Alliance of Independent Social Democrats candidate Željka Cvijanović getting elected with 51.65% of the vote. Following his defeat and a poor showing of the SDS in the election as well, Šarović announced his resignation as president of the party in November 2022.

== Personal life ==
Mirko was married to Stojanka Šarović and together they had two children. On 11 February 2024, his wife committed suicide at their home in Istočno Sarajevo.

== Orders ==
- Order of the Republika Srpska: 2012
