= Istočno Sarajevo =

City in Republika Srpska, Bosnia and Herzegovina

Istočno Sarajevo Источно Сарајево East Sarajevo
- City
- Grad Istočno Sarajevo; Град Источно Сарајево; City of East Sarajevo
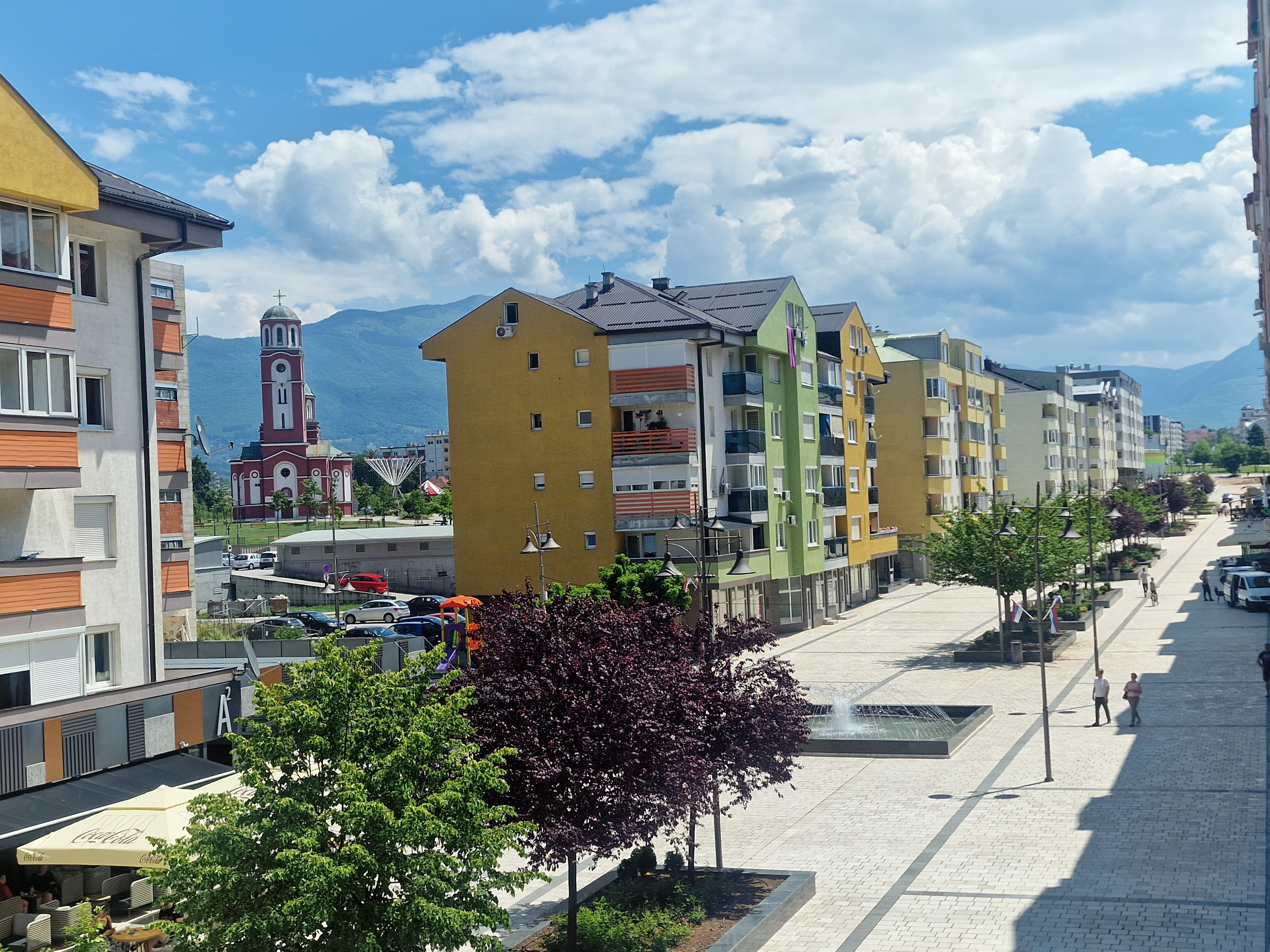
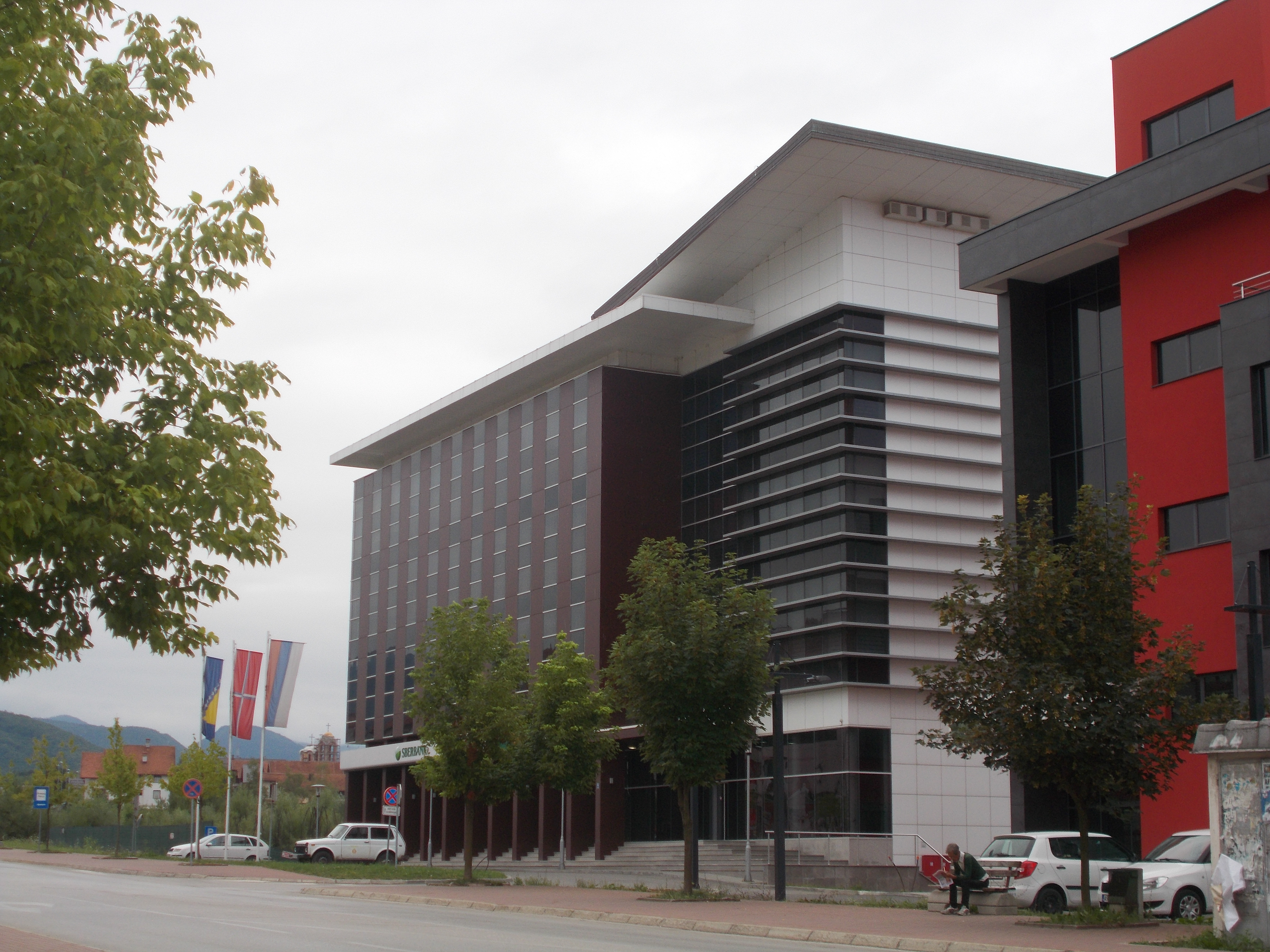
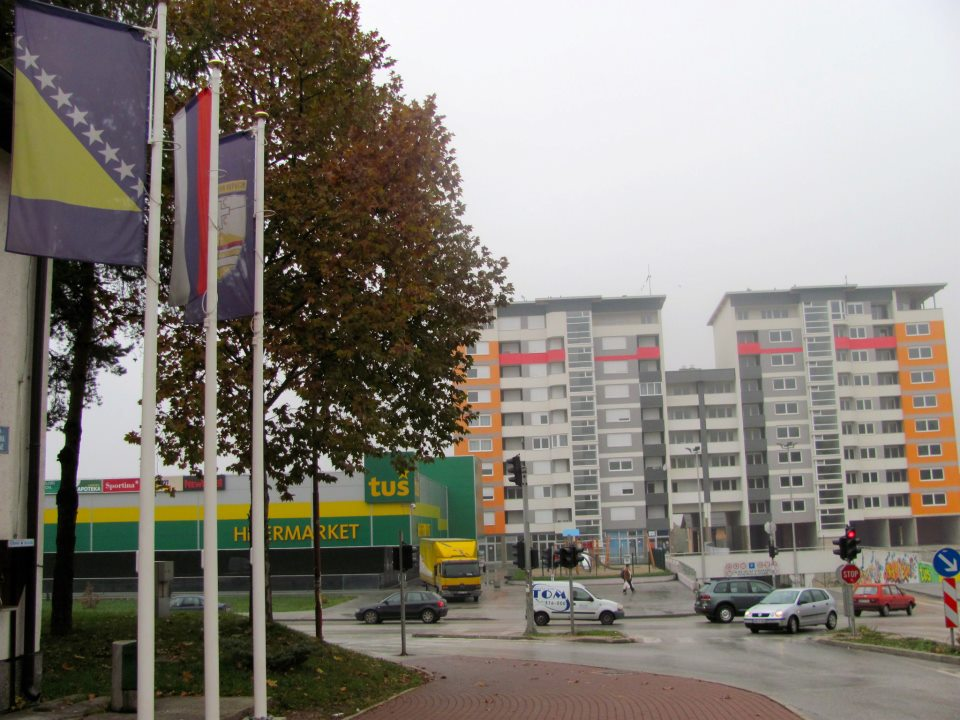
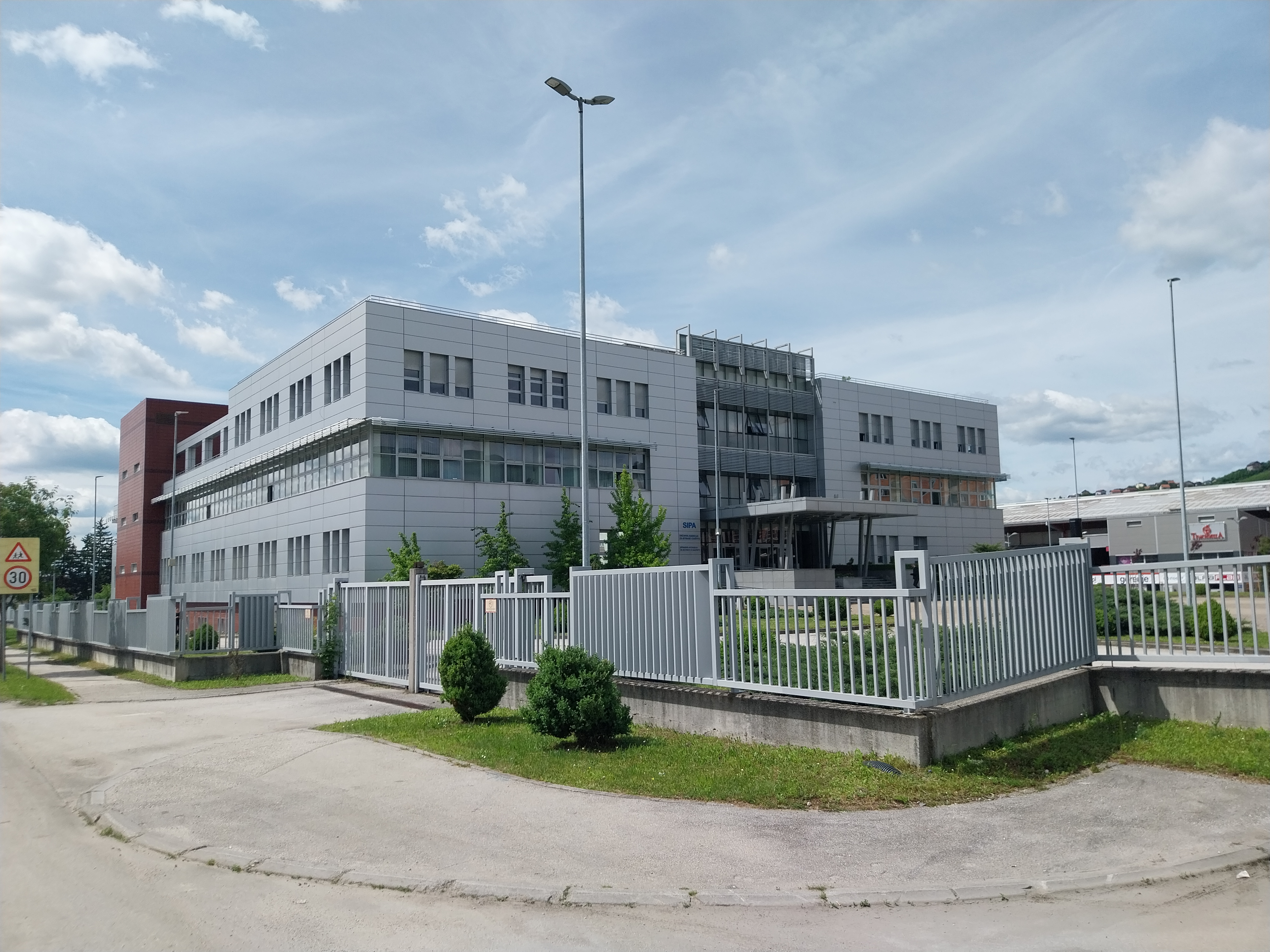
- View over central East Sarajevo City Administration building City Gate SIPA headquarters

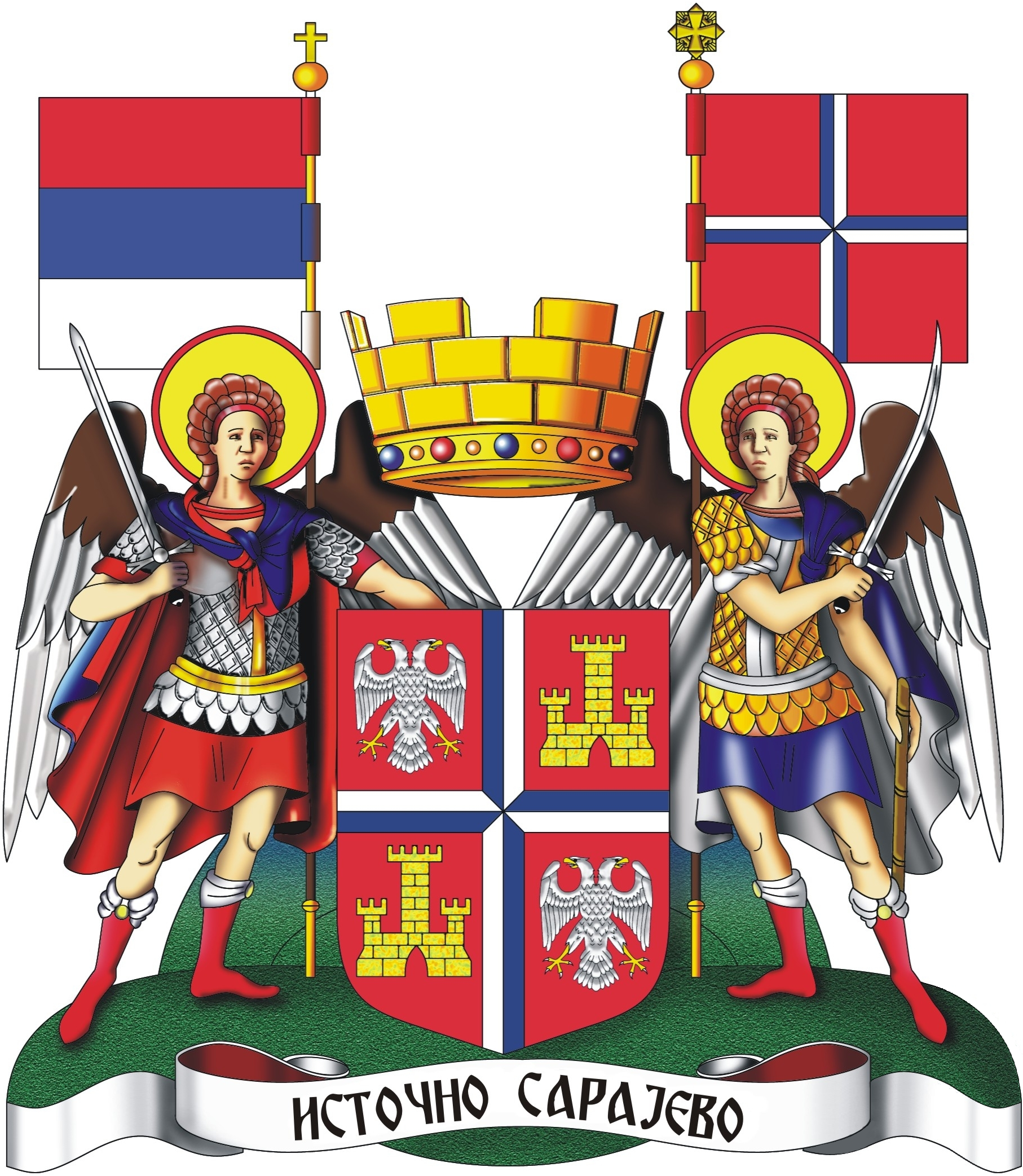
- Flag Coat of arms

- Location within Bosnia and Herzegovina Location within Europe
- Coordinates: 43°49′N 18°21′E
- Country: Bosnia and Herzegovina
- Entity: Republika Srpska
- Municipalities: Istočna Ilidža; Istočno Novo Sarajevo; Istočni Stari Grad; Pale; Sokolac; Trnovo: 6
- Geographical region: Sarajevo–Romanija
- Founded: 1993; 33 years ago

Government
  - Body: Istočno Sarajevo City Assembly
  - Mayor: Ljubiša Ćosić (SNSD)

Area
  - City: 1,450 km^{2} (560 sq mi)

Population (2013)
  - City: 61,516
  - Density: 424/km^{2} (1,100/sq mi)
  - Urban: 25,405
  - Demonym: Sarajevan (en); Sarajlija (Сарајлија) (m.); Sarajka (Сарајка) (f.) (sr)
- Time zone: UTC+1 (CET)
  - Summer (DST): UTC+2 (CEST)
- Postal code: 71123 to 71420
- Area code: +387 57
- Major airport: Sarajevo International Airport
- Website: www.gradistocnosarajevo.net

Istočno Sarajevo (Serbian Cyrillic: Источно Сарајево, lit. 'East Sarajevo') is a city in Bosnia and Herzegovina. It consists of a few suburban areas located south of pre-war Sarajevo. The seat of the city is the neighborhood of Lukavica, Istočno Novo Sarajevo.

With an area of 1,450 km^{2}, Istočno Sarajevo is one of the largest administrative areas in the Balkans. It is estimated that in 2022 it had a population of 60,120 inhabitants. It is the only city of the entity that includes several municipalities. It is separated from Sarajevo by the Inter-Entity Boundary Line.

Today, Istočno Sarajevo shares its Olympic history with Sarajevo when the city hosted the 1984 Winter Olympics. In addition, both cities hosted the 2019 European Youth Olympic Winter Festival.

== History ==
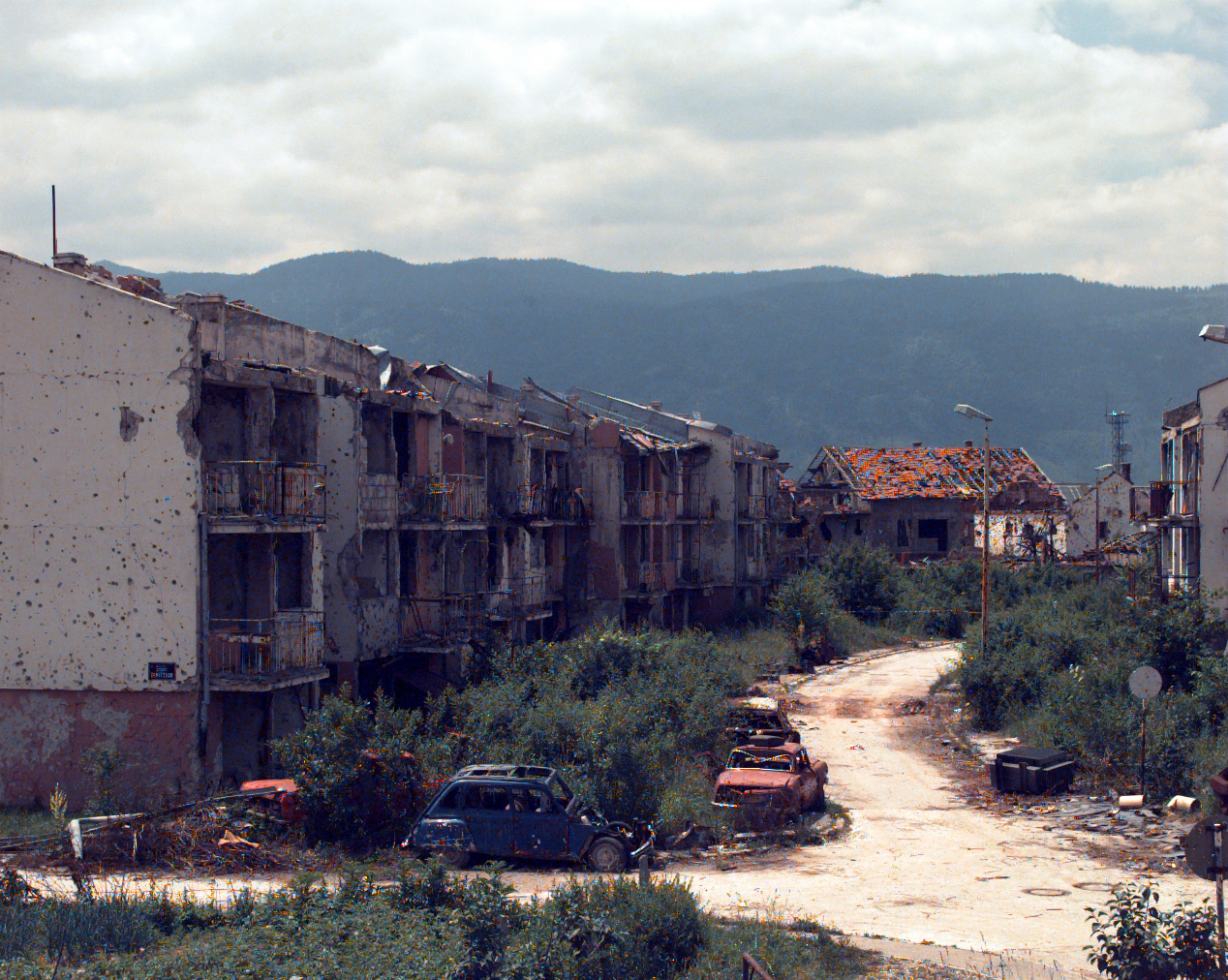
Parts of Sarajevo, Dobrinja, Aerodromsko Naselje, destroyed during the Siege of Sarajevo.

At the start of the Bosnian War, in late summer 1992, the Serb members of the pre-war municipality of Novo Sarajevo, elected at the 1990 multiparty elections, left the municipal assembly and set up their own separate council (Srpska opština Novo Sarajevo) in the building of the local community of Lukavica, headed by the Commissioner of the Presidency of the Republika Srpska Dragan Đokanović.

The city of Istočno Sarajevo was first created when the Council of the Srpskog grada Sarajeva (Serbian City of Sarajevo) adopted a statutory decision on the organization of the Serbian City of Sarajevo at its session on 13 March 1993. It was the part of the pre-war city of Sarajevo under control of the Army of Republika Srpska during the war was known, was deemed the official capital of Republika Srpska.

The first Law on this city was adopted on 30 December 1993, when the National Assembly of the Republika Srpska adopted the Law on the Serbian City of Sarajevo. After the end of the Bosnian War, the National Assembly of the Republika Srpska on 2 April 1996, passed the Law on the Srpskom gradu Sarajevu (Serbian City of Sarajevo), which changed the name of the city to the Srpsko Sarajevo (Serbian Sarajevo).

Following the decision on the name of the cities in 2004 by the Constitutional Court of Bosnia and Herzegovina, which outruled the use of the prefix Srpski (Serbian), the city was renamed Istočno Sarajevo (East Sarajevo).

On 27 June 2014, a statue to Gavrilo Princip was inaugurated in Lukavica. The city park was also named after Princip.

== Environment ==
=== Geography ===
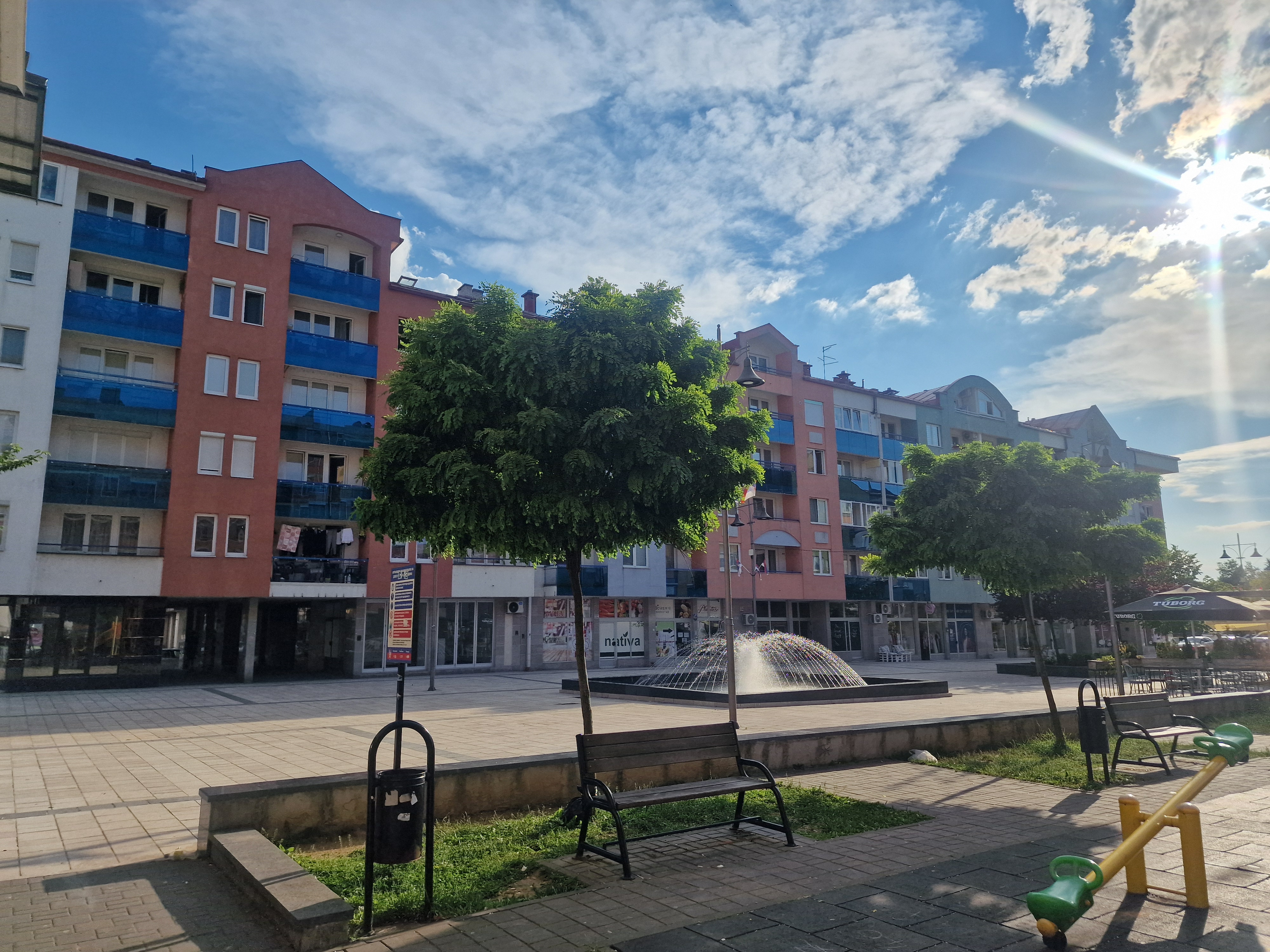
Promenade of East Sarajevo

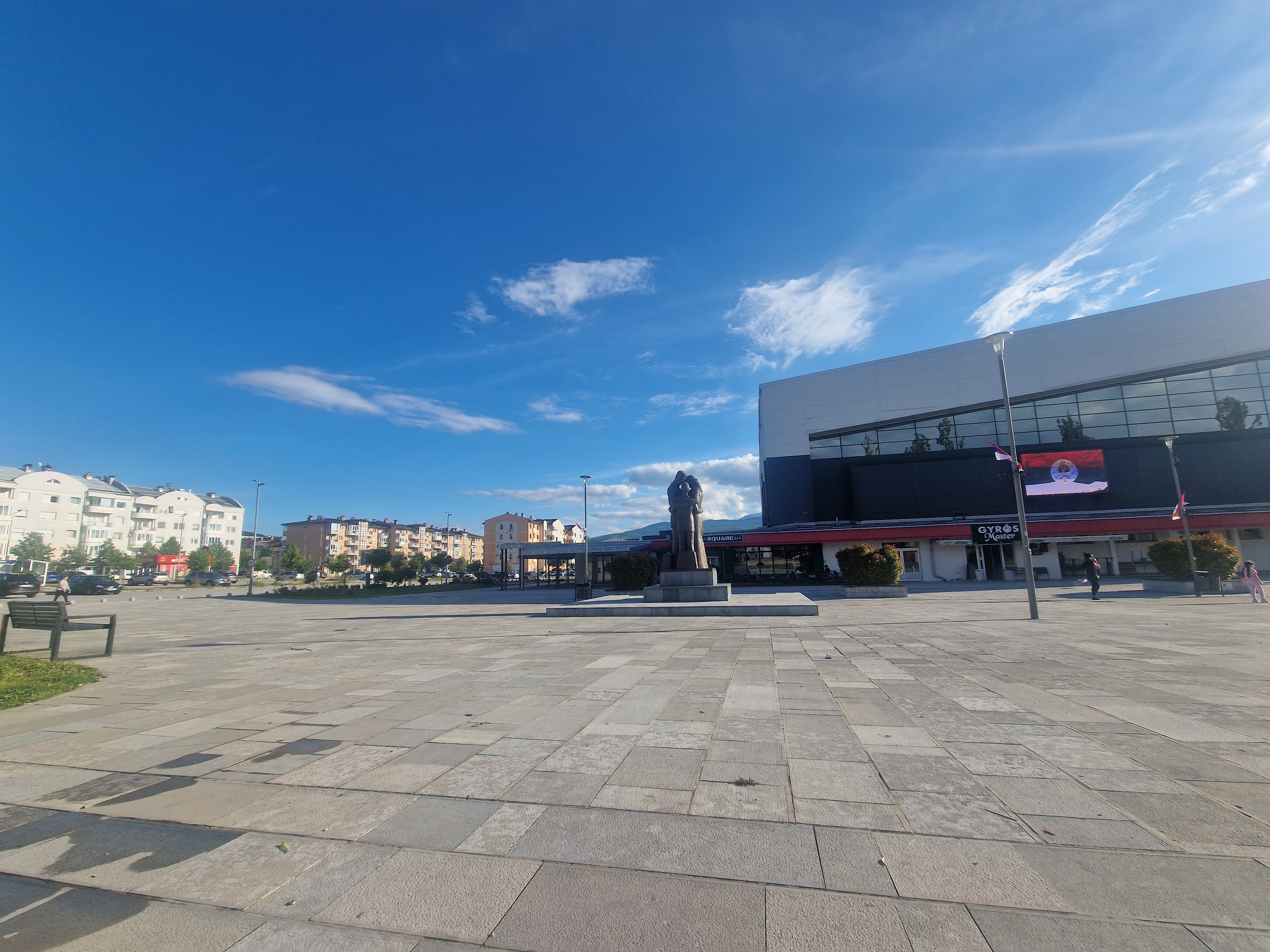
Square of East Sarajevo

Istočno Sarajevo lies in the south-western part of the Sarajevo valley, in the middle of the Dinaric Alps. The city is surrounded by heavily forested hills and five major mountains. The highest of the surrounding peaks is Treskavica at 2,088 meters (6,850 ft), then Bjelašnica at 2,067 meters (6,781 ft), Jahorina at 1,913 meters (6,276 ft), Trebević at 1,627 meters (5,338 ft), with 1,502 meters (4,928 ft) Igman being the shortest. Last four are also known as Olympics mountains of Sarajevo (see also 1984 Winter Olympic Games in Sarajevo).

The Željeznica river is one of the city's chief geographic features. It flows through the city from south through the Trnovo, Kijevo, Krupac and Vojkovići, parts of Istočno Sarajevo to the western part of Sarajevo, where it eventually meets up with the Bosna river.

=== Climate ===
Istočno Sarajevo has a mild continental climate, lying between the climate zones of central Europe to the north and the Mediterranean to the south. The average yearly temperature is 9.5 °C, with January (-1.3 °C avg.) being the coldest month of the year and July (19.1 °C avg.) the warmest. The highest recorded temperature was 40.0 °C on 19 August 1946, while the lowest recorded temperature was −26.4 °C on 25 January 1942. On average, Istočno Sarajevo has 68 summer days per year (temperature greater than or equal to 30.0 °C). The city typically experiences mildly cloudy skies, with an average yearly cloud cover of 59%. The cloudiest month is December (75% average cloud cover) while the clearest is August (37%). Moderate precipitation occurs fairly consistently throughout the year, with an average 170 days of rainfall. Suitable climatic conditions have allowed winter sports to flourish in the region, as exemplified by the Winter Olympics in 1984 that were celebrated in Sarajevo.

== Economy ==
The city of Istočno Sarajevo is the administrative, industrial, commercial, financial and cultural center of the eastern part of Republika Srpska. The position of Istočno Sarajevo is strategically important, located near the biggest city of Bosnia and Herzegovina, the city of Sarajevo. Istočno Sarajevo is easily accessible, having an airport close to the city - Sarajevo International Airport, and being a point of intersection of numerous roads.

Istočno Sarajevo is one of the most important industrial centers in Bosnia and Herzegovina, well known for its companies: Elko, Famos, Energoinvest, Unis and others.

== Tourism and Sport ==
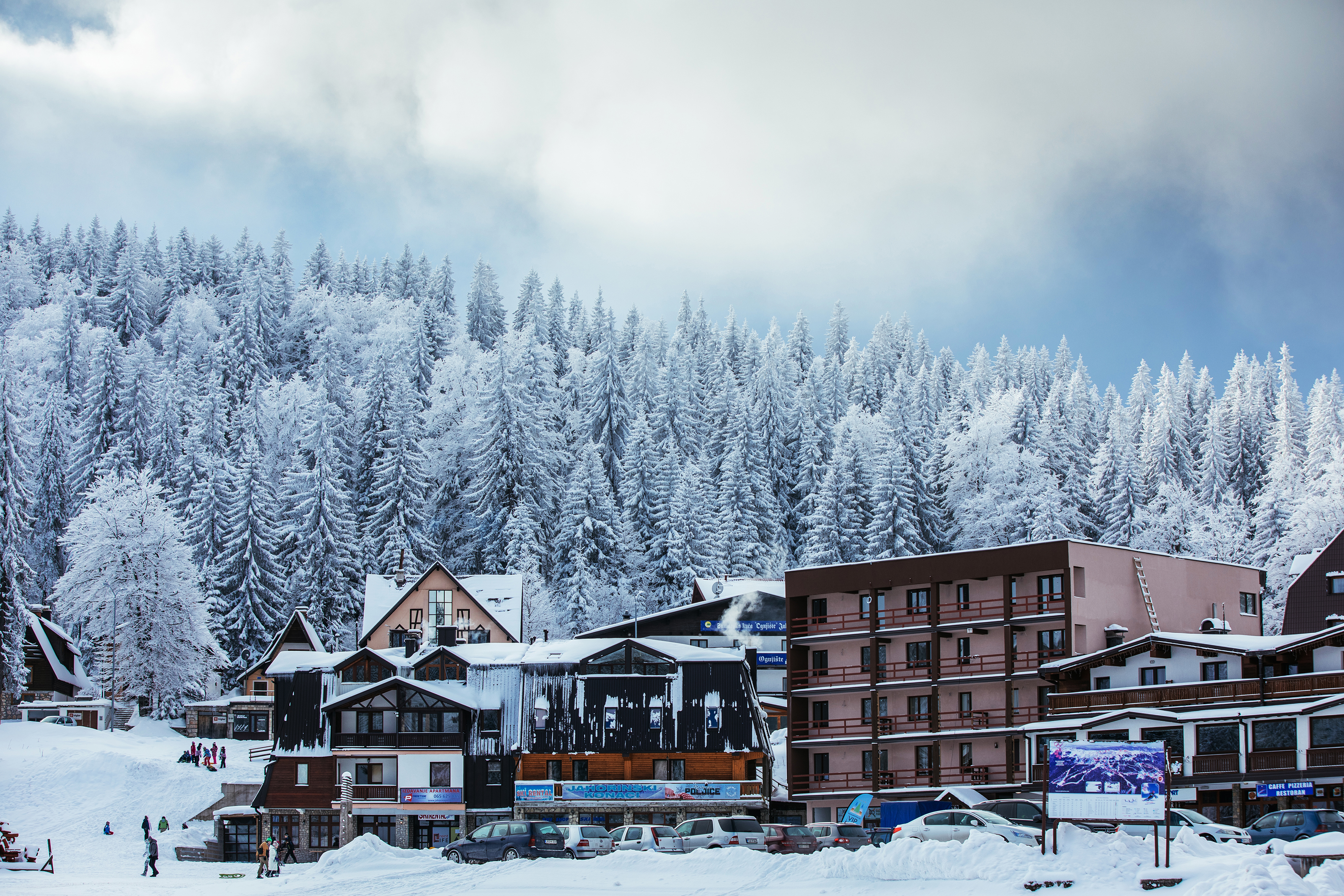
Jahorina Ski Resort

The Jahorina Mountain is one of the highest mountains of the Dinaric system. It is 30 kilometers long mountain range, with several peaks, of which the highest peak Ogorjelica is 1916 meters above sea level. From Sarajevo it is distanced 28, from Banja Luka 200, of Belgrade 320, and 350 kilometers from Zagreb. The Jahorina ski resort is located on the slopes of Jahorina Mountain.

The local football clubs are Slavija that plays in the First League of the Republika Srpska and Famos that competes in the Second League of the Republika Srpska.

Basketball Club Slavija is a basketball club from the City of Istočno Sarajevo that competes in the National Championship of Bosnia and Herzegovina.

Pale is a major center for volleyball in Bosnia and Herzegovina. The men's team OK Student Pale and the women's team OK Jahorina Pale compete in the country's top-tier Premier League, while OK Mokro and OK Slavija compete in the second-tier First League of Republika Srpska.

The 2019 European Youth Olympic Winter Festival was held in Sarajevo & Istočno Sarajevo, from 9 to 16 February.

== Administration ==
=== Municipalities ===
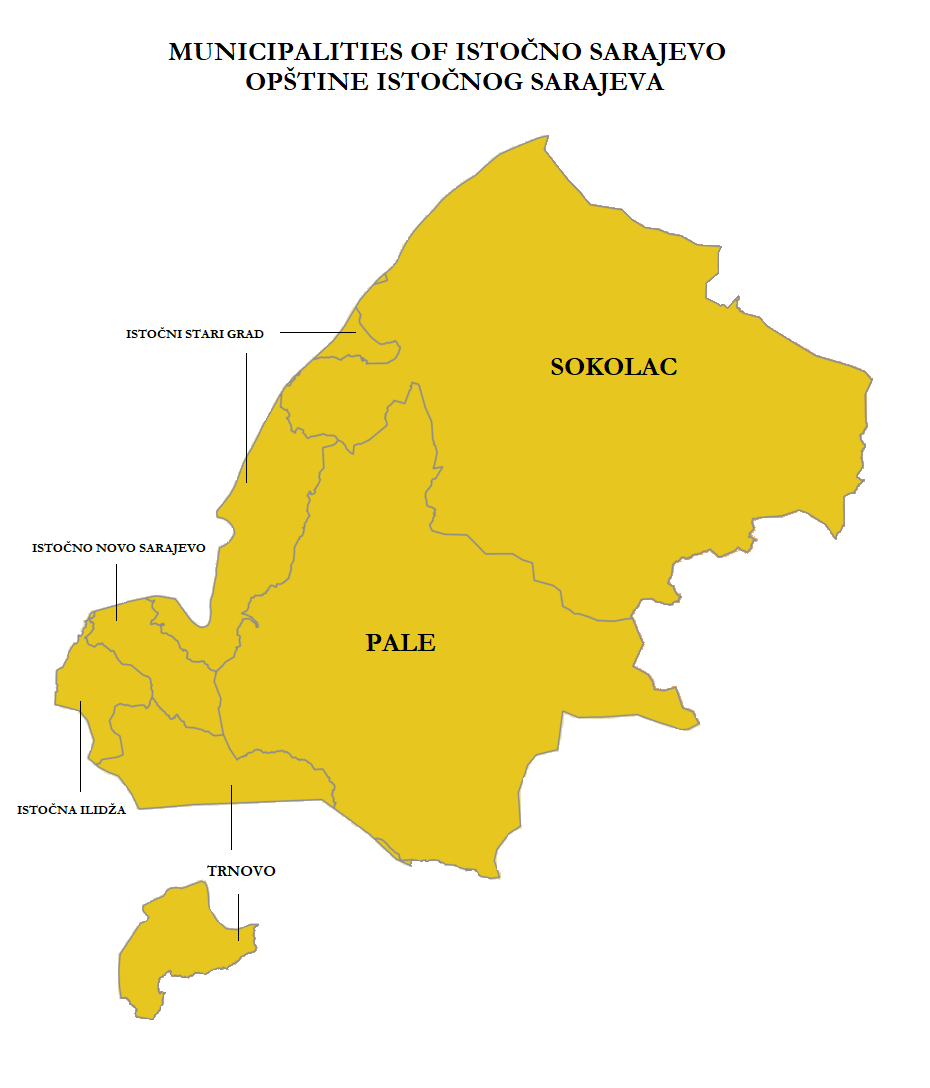
Municipalities of Istočno Sarajevo

The City of Istočno Sarajevo consists of six municipalities. Three of which; Istočna Ilidža, Istočno Novo Sarajevo and Istočni Stari Grad, were formed by separating the existing pre-war municipalities of Sarajevo between the Republika Srpska and the Federation of Bosnia and Herzegovina. The municipalities of Pale and Trnovo were formed in the same way. The municipality of Sokolac is the only municipality that entered the City of Istočno Sarajevo as a whole.

Istočno Sarajevo consists of two municipalities of the urban area (Istočno Novo Sarajevo and Istočna Ilidža) and four municipalities of the suburban area (Pale, Trnovo, Sokolac and Istočni Stari Grad). In contrast to the municipalities of Istočno Novo Sarajevo and Istočna Ilidža, which are an integral part of city, the municipalities of Pale, Trnovo, Istočni Stari Grad and Sokolac are only formally part of it. The administrative, business, cultural and sports center of the Istočno Sarajevo is the neighborhood of Lukavica, Istočno Novo Sarajevo.

Each municipality operates their own municipal government, while united they form one city government with its constitution. The executive branch (Serbian: Gradska uprava) consists of a mayor, with deputy and a cabinet.

The legislative branch consists of the City Council, or Skupština grada. The council has 31 members, including a council speaker, deputy, and a secretary. Councilors are elected by the lists of candidates according to the proportional representation system of political parties, coalitions, lists of independent candidates or groups of members.

Municipalities of Istočno Sarajevo are further split into "local communities" (Serbian: Mjesne zajednice). Local communities have a small role in city government and are intended as a way for ordinary citizens to get involved in city government. They are based on key neighborhoods in the city.

=== Mayors ===
The first municipal elections in Republika Srpska were held in 1997. Since then, the City of Istočno Sarajevo has had 8 mayors. Chronologically, they are:

- Mirko Šarović, SDS (1997–1999)
- Predrag Lasica, SDS (2000–2003)
- Milivoje Gutalj, SDS (2003–2005)
- Radivoje Kezunović, SDS (2005–2009)
- Vinko Radovanović, PDP (2009–2013)
- Nenad Samardžija, SDS (2013–2017)
- Nenad Vuković, PDP (2017–2020)
- Ljubiša Ćosić, SNSD (2020 – present)

== Demographics ==
According to the 2013 census results, the city of Istočno Sarajevo has a population of 61,516 inhabitants.

=== Ethnic groups ===
The ethnic composition of the city:

Ethnic group	Population 2013
Serbs	57,953
Bosniaks	2,429
Croats	442
Others	692
Total	61,516

== Education ==
Istočno Sarajevo has 11 primary schools and 4 secondary schools including 3 gymnasiums.

=== University of Istočno Sarajevo ===
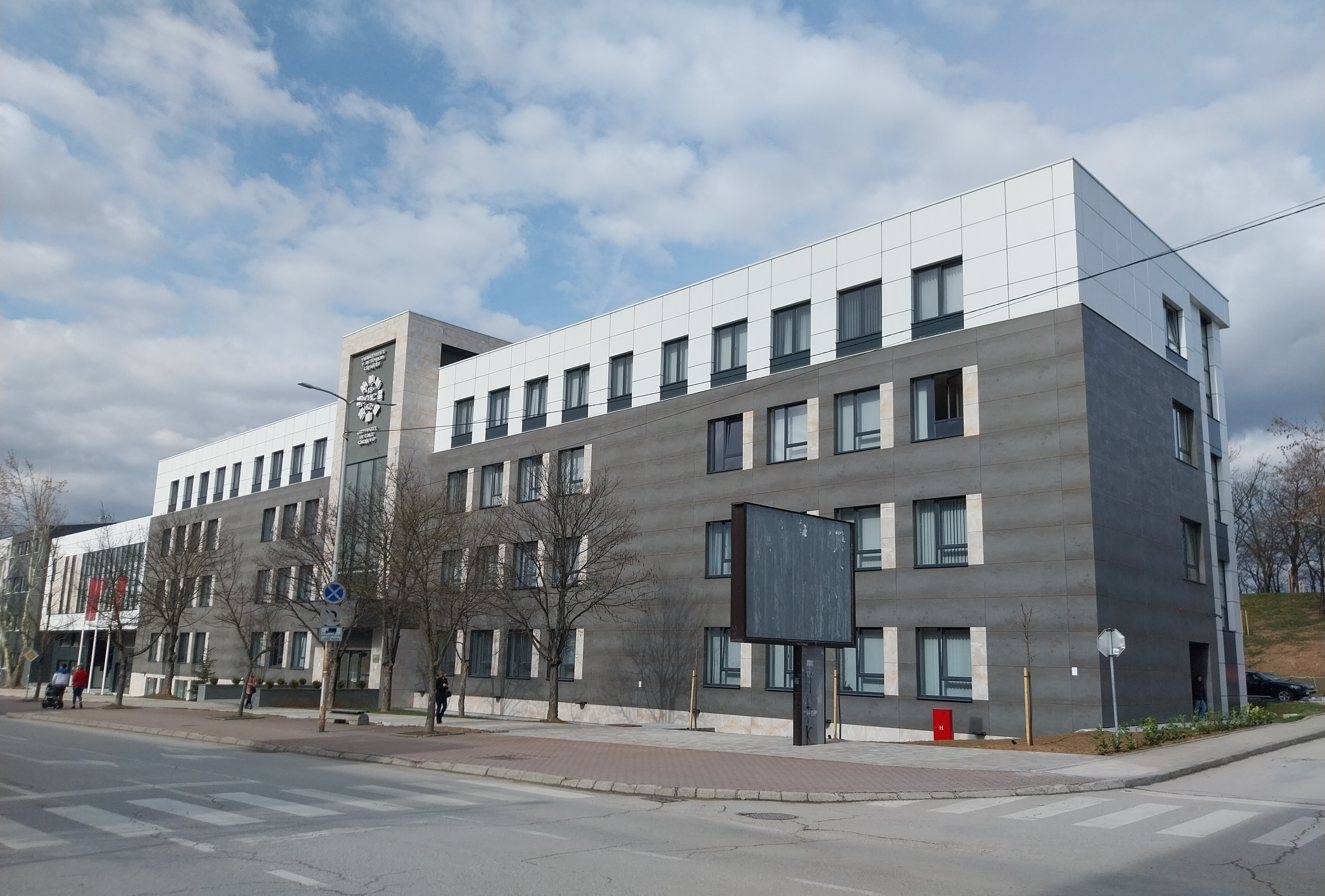
Rectorate of the University of Istočno Sarajevo

Founded in 1992, the University of Istočno Sarajevo is a public university located in Lukavica, Istočno Novo Sarajevo. Ever since its foundation, the university has been continually growing and developing and now consists of 14 faculties, two art academies and the Institute of Historian Science.

According to SCImago Institutions Rankings, University of Istočno Sarajevo is the best institution of high education in Bosnia and Herzegovina.

== International relations ==
=== Twin towns – sister cities ===
List of Istočno Sarajevo's sister and twin cities:

- Kruševac, Serbia (2013)
- Kolomna, Russia (2020)
- Novi Sad, Serbia (2021)
- Niš, Serbia (2022)
- Cangzhou, China (2023)
- Krasnodar, Russia (2024)
- Sombor, Serbia (2025)
- Nizhny Novgorod, Russia (2025)
- Herceg Novi, Montenegro (2025)

== Notable people ==
- Mirko Šarović, politician
- Ljubiša Ćosić, politician
- Halid Bešlić, singer
- Aleksandar Kosorić, footballer
- Nemanja Majdov, judoka

== See also ==
- Romanija
- Serbs of Sarajevo
