= Sim Radio =

Bosnian radio station

- Bijeljina; Bosnia and Herzegovina
- Broadcast area: Bijeljina
- Frequency: Bijeljina 103.0 MHz
- RDS: SIM

Programming
- Language: Serbian language
- Format: Local news, talk and music

Ownership
- Owner: "Panorama - pres" d.o.o. Bijeljina

History
- Founded: December 22, 2023
- Former names: Pan

Technical information
- Licensing authority: CRA BiH
- Transmitter coordinates: 44°45′25″N 19°12′58″E
- Repeater: Bijeljina/Silos

Links
- Webcast: https://simradio.net/
- Website: https://simradio.net/

Sim Radio is a Bosnian local commercial radio station, broadcasting from Bijeljina, Bosnia and Herzegovina. This radio station broadcasts a variety of programs such music and local news.

The owner of the local radio station is the company Panorama - pres d.o.o. Bijeljina.

SIM Radio was established on December 22, 2023 Program is mainly produced in Serbian language at one FM frequency (Bijeljina 103.0 MHz) and it is available in the city of Bijeljina as well as in nearby municipalities in Semberija area.

Estimated number of listeners of Pan Radio is around 66.597.

== Frequencies ==
- Bijeljina 103.0 MHz

== See also ==
- List of radio stations in Bosnia and Herzegovina
- BN Radio
- Bobar Radio
- Bobar Radio - Studio B2
- RSG Radio
- Daš Radio
- Daš Extra Radio
