= Zabar =

Zabar may refer to:

== Places ==
- Zabar, Hungary, a village in Hungary
- Žabar, Šabac, a village in Serbia
- Donji Žabar, a village and municipality in Bosnia and Herzegovina
- Fathah, an Arabic diacritic known in Urdu as "zabar"

== Businesses ==
- Zabar's, a food emporium in Manhattan
- Zabr, a village in Iran

== See also ==
- Zabur, Psalms in Islam
