= 2016 Bosnian municipal elections =

- 2 October 2016

All 144 municipal/city mayors All 144 municipal/city councils
- Registered: 3,179,720
- Turnout: 53.88% (▼2.63 pp)
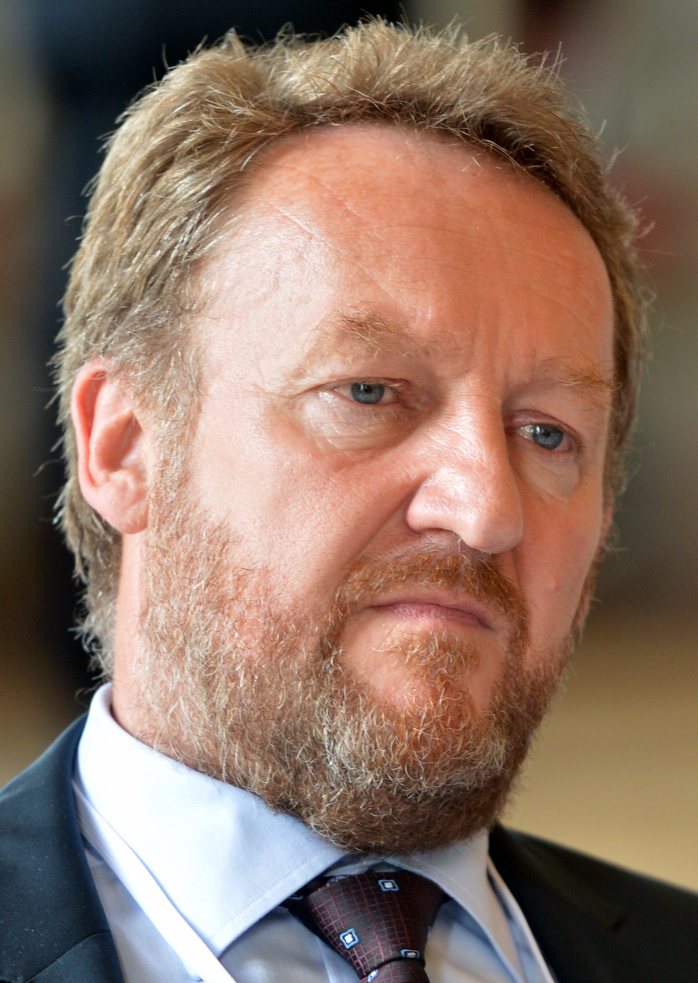

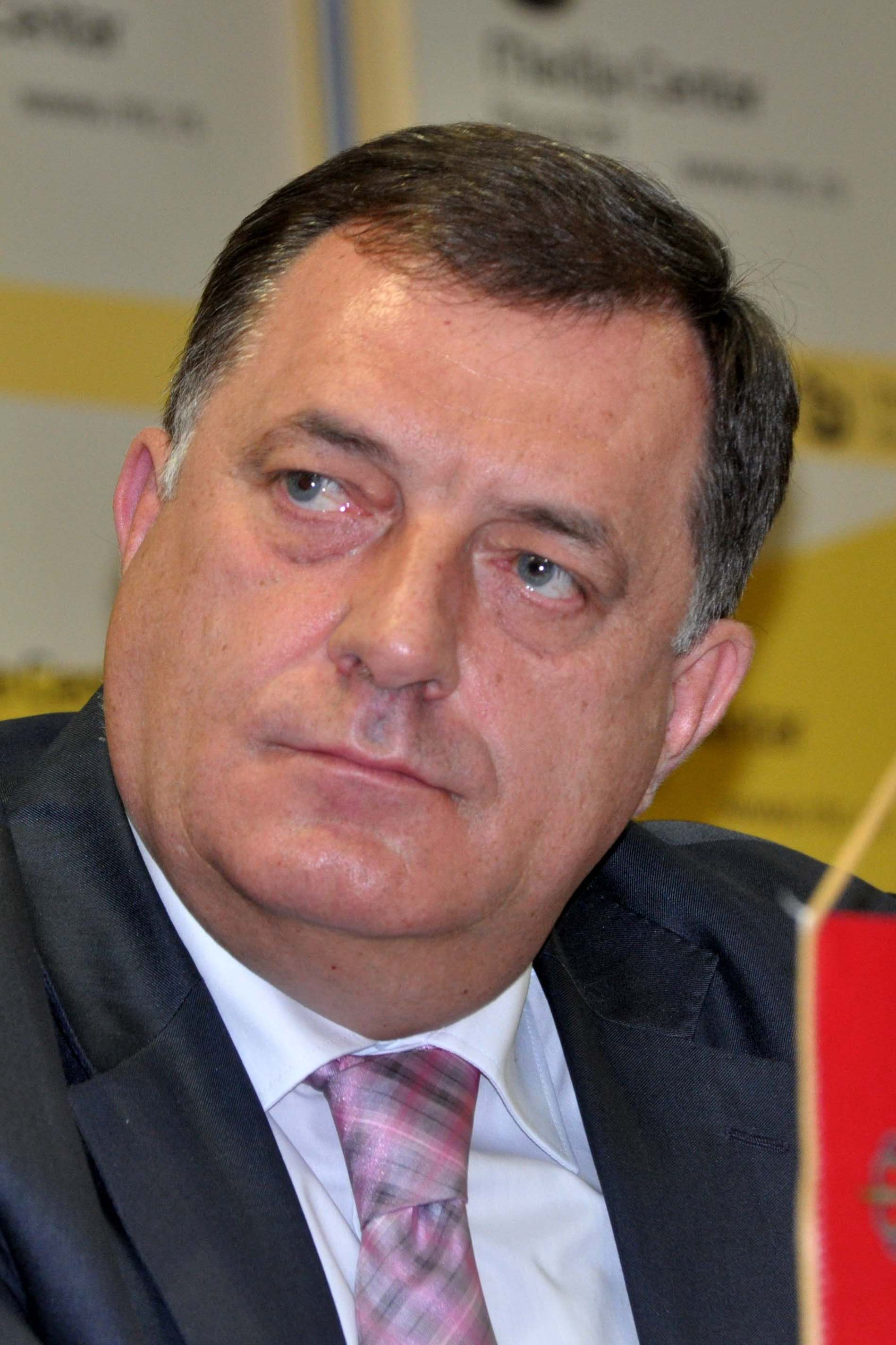

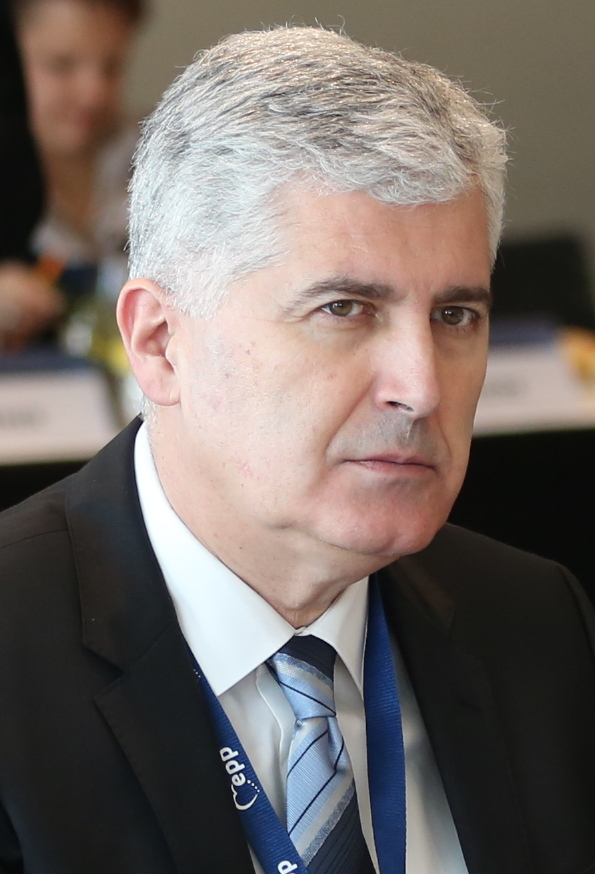

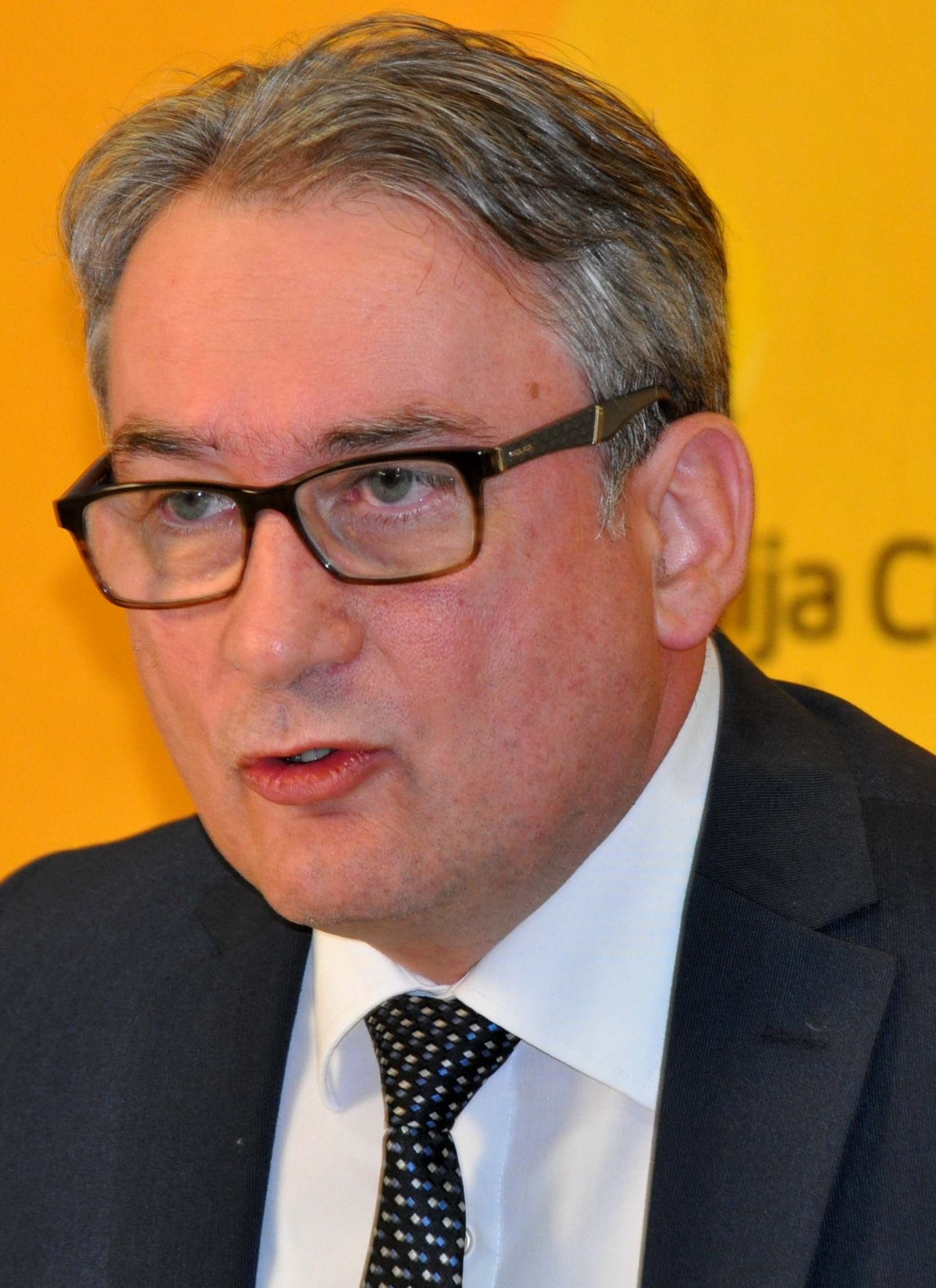

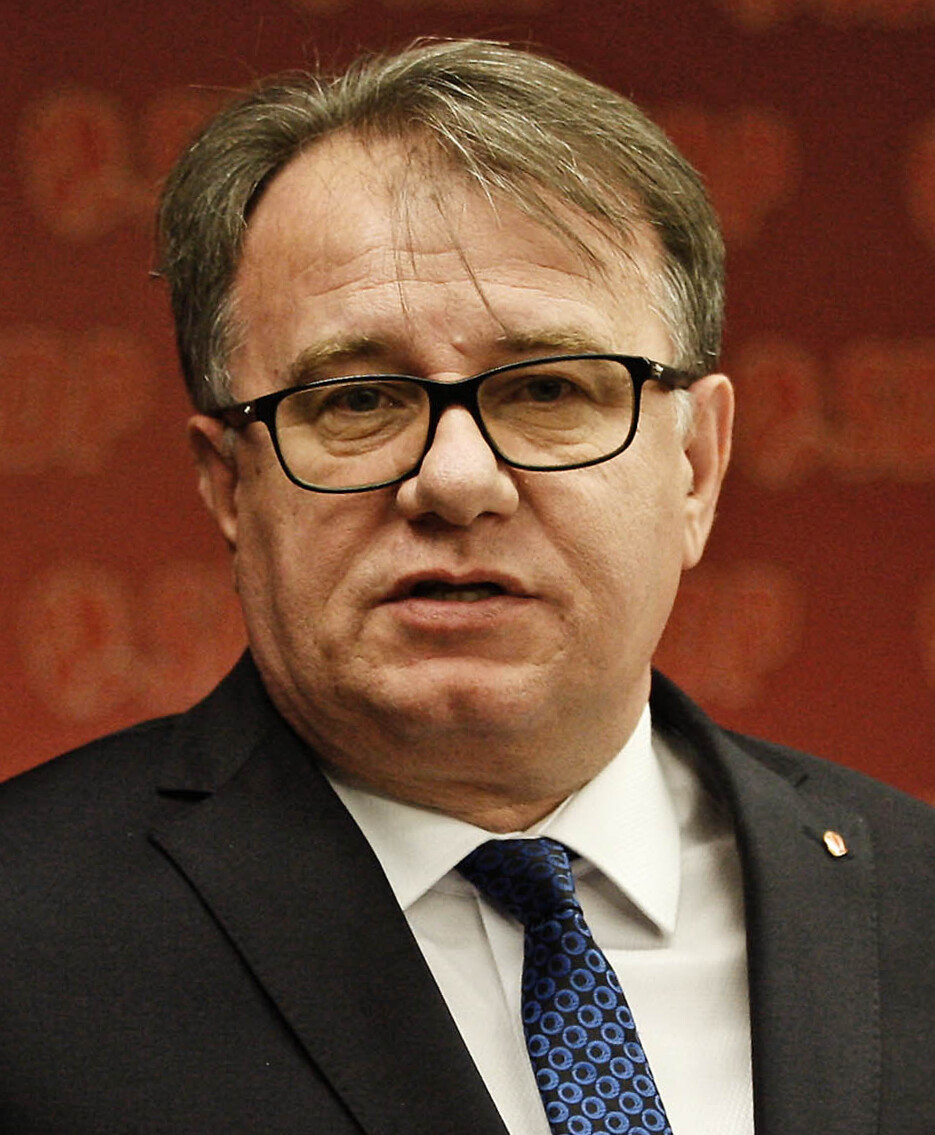
	First party	Second party	Third party
Leader	Bakir Izetbegović	Milorad Dodik	Dragan Čović
Party	SDA	SNSD	HDZ BiH
Mayors	34	33	19
Change	▼3	▲13	▲5
Percentage	23.61%	22.91%	13.19%
	Fourth party	Fifth party	Sixth party
		IND
Leader	Mladen Bosić	None	Nermin Nikšić
Party	SDS	Independent	SDP BiH
Mayors	16	14	8
Change	▼16	▲9	▼2
Percentage	11.11%	9.72%	5.55%
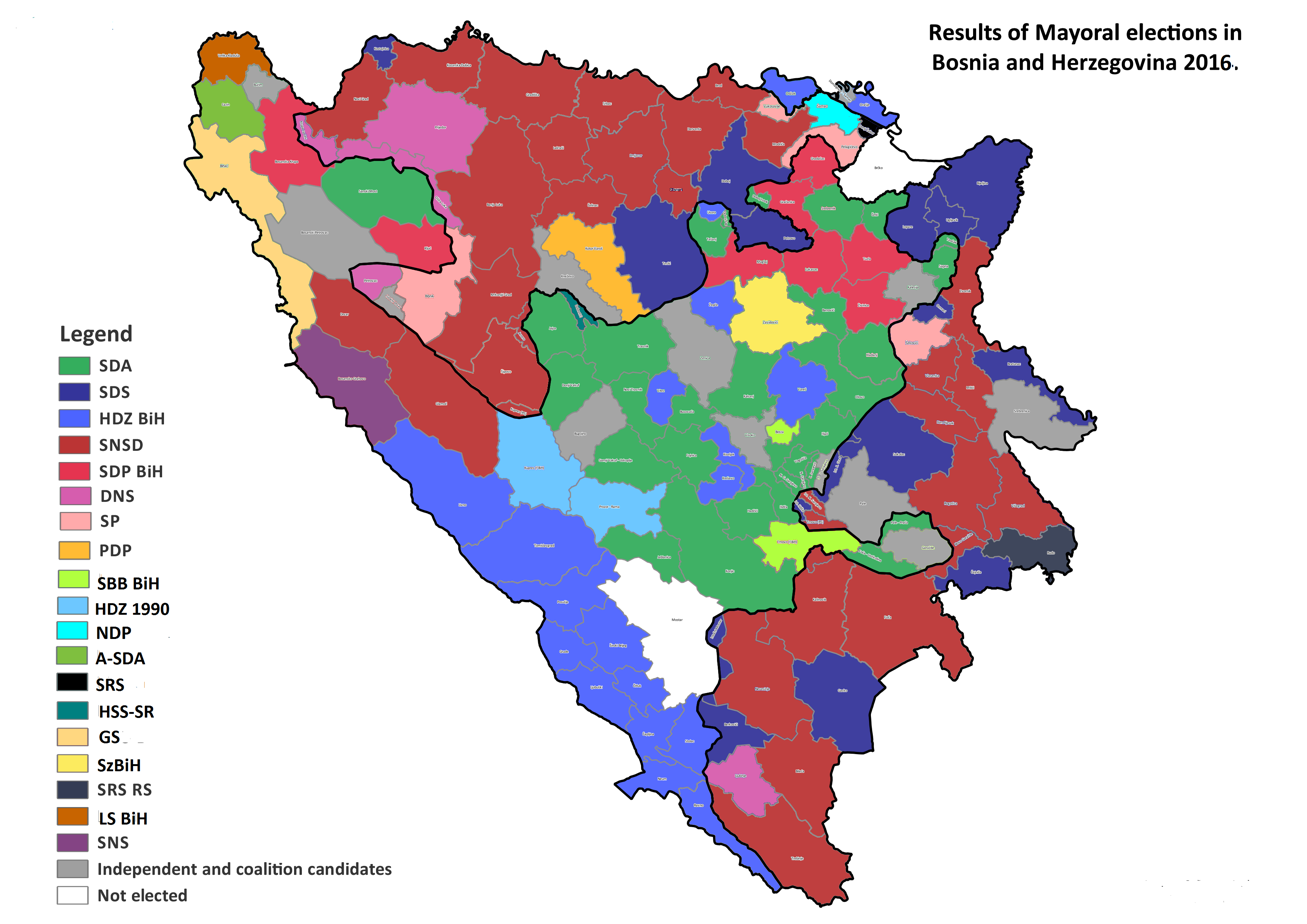
- Results by municipality.

Municipal elections were held in Bosnia and Herzegovina on 2 October 2016 to elect mayors and assemblies in 144 municipalities and cities.

A total of 3,263,906 voters were registered in the Central Voters’ Register, including 65,111 by-mail voters. Around 25,000 citizens voted at polling stations in diplomatic representations abroad.

30,000 candidates were contesting the election for 2,835 local councillors, 301 city councillors, 131 municipal mayors and 12 city majors.

The Central Electoral Commission registered a total of 3,179,720 persons eligible to vote (excluding Stolac); 1,739,756 votes were cast, of which 1,635,602 (94.01%) valid, and 104,154 (5.99%) invalid.

== Summary ==
Local elections took place in a rather heated political environment, being preceded by one week by an illegal referendum in the Republika Srpska entity on the 9 January holiday, which had been declared unconstitutional by the Constitutional Court. Although the same Court declared the referendum null and void, it took place equally. The political discourse in the pre-electoral period focus on ethno-national issues rather than local administration.

Voting took place regularly and without major incidents. For the first time, a 40% gender quota was applied to candidate lists; however, only seven women were elected as mayor out of 144. Some irregularities in the electoral process were reported, including as regards inflated voters' lists and the politicisation of electoral administration. No elections could be held in Mostar, for the second time in a row. Elections in Stolac were suspending following violent incidents and later repeated on 19 February.

== Results ==
=== Federation of Bosnia and Herzegovina ===
==== By municipality ====
Municipality	Mayor's party before election	New elected mayor's party	Relative/absolute winner in municipal or city council
Banovići	Party of Democratic Action	Party of Democratic Action	Party of Democratic Action
Bihać	Party of Democratic Action	Civic Alliance	Party of Democratic Action
Bosanska Krupa	Social Democratic Party	Social Democratic Party	Party of Democratic Action
Bosanski Petrovac	Independent	Independent	Party of Democratic Action
Bosansko Grahovo	Alliance of Independent Social Democrats	Serbian Progressive Party	Serbian Progressive Party
Breza	Independent	Union for a Better Future	Party of Democratic Action
Bugojno	Independent	Independent	Party of Democratic Action
Busovača	Party of Democratic Action	Party of Democratic Action	Party of Democratic Action
Bužim	Party of Democratic Action	Independent	Party of Democratic Action
Čapljina	Croatian Democratic Union	Croatian Democratic Union	Croatian Democratic Union
Cazin	Party of Democratic Activity	Party of Democratic Activity	Party of Democratic Activity
Čelić	Party of Democratic Action	Party of Democratic Action	Party of Democratic Action
Centar, Sarajevo	Democratic Front	Party of Democratic Action	Party of Democratic Action
Čitluk	Croatian Democratic Union	Croatian Democratic Union	Croatian Democratic Union
Drvar	Alliance of Independent Social Democrats	Alliance of Independent Social Democrats	Alliance of Independent Social Democrats
Doboj East	Party of Democratic Action	Party of Democratic Action	Party of Democratic Action
Doboj South	Social Democratic Party	Party of Democratic Action	Social Democratic Party
Dobretići	Croatian Party of Rights	Croatian Peasant Party of Stjepan Radić	Coalition for Pougarje (HSS SR-HSP)
Domaljevac-Šamac	Croatian Democratic Union 1990	Independent	Croatian Democratic Union
Donji Vakuf	Party of Democratic Action	Party of Democratic Action	Party of Democratic Action
Foča-Ustikolina	Party of Democratic Action	Party of Democratic Action	Party for Better Goražde
Fojnica	Party of Democratic Action	Party of Democratic Action	Party of Democratic Action
Glamoč	Alliance of Independent Social Democrats	Alliance of Independent Social Democrats	Alliance of Independent Social Democrats
Goražde	Union for a Better Future	Independent	Party of Democratic Action
Gornji Vakuf-Uskoplje	Party of Democratic Action	Party of Democratic Action	Party of Democratic Action
Gračanica	Social Democratic Party	Social Democratic Party	Party of Democratic Action
Gradačac	Social Democratic Party	Social Democratic Party	Social Democratic Party
Grude	Croatian Democratic Union	Croatian Democratic Union	Croatian Democratic Union
Hadžići	Party of Democratic Action	Party of Democratic Action	Party of Democratic Action
Ilidža	Party of Democratic Action	Party of Democratic Action	Party of Democratic Action
Ilijaš	Party of Democratic Action	Party of Democratic Action	Party of Democratic Action
Jablanica	Party of Democratic Action	Party of Democratic Action	Party of Democratic Action
Jajce	Party of Democratic Action	Party of Democratic Action	Together for Better Future of Jajce (HDZ-HDZ 1990-HKDU)
Kakanj	Party of Democratic Action	Party of Democratic Action	Party of Democratic Action
Kalesija	Party of Democratic Action	Independent	Party of Democratic Action
Kiseljak	Croatian Democratic Union	Croatian Democratic Union	Coalition HDZ-HSS SR
Kladanj	Social Democratic Union	Party of Democratic Action	Party of Democratic Action
Ključ	Social Democratic Party	Social Democratic Party	Party of Democratic Action
Konjic	Party of Democratic Action	Party of Democratic Action	Party of Democratic Action
Kreševo	Croatian Democratic Union	Croatian Democratic Union	Croatian Democratic Union
Kupres	Croatian Democratic Union	Croatian Democratic Union 1990	Croatian Democratic Union
Livno	Croatian Democratic Union	Croatian Democratic Union	Croatian Democratic Union
Ljubuški	Croatian Democratic Union	Croatian Democratic Union	Croatian Democratic Union
Lukavac	Party of Democratic Action	Social Democratic Party	Party of Democratic Action
Maglaj	Party of Democratic Action	Social Democratic Party	Party of Democratic Action
Mostar	no election	no election	no election
Neum	Croatian Democratic Union	Croatian Democratic Union	Croatian Democratic Union
Novi Grad, Sarajevo	Party of Democratic Action	Party of Democratic Action	Party of Democratic Action
Novo Sarajevo	Party of Democratic Action	Party of Democratic Action	Party of Democratic Action
Novi Travnik	Party of Democratic Action	Party of Democratic Action	Coalition HDZ-HSS SR-HDZ 1990
Odžak	Party of Democratic Action	Croatian Democratic Union	Croatian Democratic Union
Olovo	Party of Democratic Action	Party of Democratic Action	Party of Democratic Action
Orašje	Croatian Democratic Union	Croatian Democratic Union	Croatian Democratic Union
Pale-Prača	Party of Democratic Action	Party of Democratic Action	Party of Democratic Action
Posušje	Croatian Democratic Union 1990	Croatian Democratic Union	Croatian Democratic Union
Prozor-Rama	Croatian Democratic Union 1990	Croatian Democratic Union 1990	Coalition of Croatian Parties (HDZ-HSP-RDS)
Ravno	Croatian coalition (HDZ, HDZ 1990)	Croatian Democratic Union	Croatian Democratic Union
Sanski Most	Party of Democratic Action	Party of Democratic Action	Party of Democratic Action
Sapna	Independent	Party of Democratic Action	Party of Democratic Action
Sarajevo	Social Democratic Party	Party of Democratic Action	Party of Democratic Action
Široki Brijeg	Croatian Democratic Union	Croatian Democratic Union	Croatian Democratic Union
Srebrenik	Party of Democratic Action	Party of Democratic Action	Party of Democratic Action
Stari Grad, Sarajevo	Union for a Better Future	Independent	Party of Democratic Action
Stolac	Croatian Democratic Union	Croatian Democratic Union	Croatian Democratic Union
Teočak	Party of Democratic Action	Party of Democratic Action	Party of Democratic Action
Tešanj	Party of Democratic Action	Party of Democratic Action	Party of Democratic Action
Tomislavgrad	Croatian Democratic Union	Croatian Democratic Union	Croatian Democratic Union
Travnik	Party of Democratic Action	Party of Democratic Action	Party of Democratic Action
Trnovo (FBiH)	Social Democratic Party	Party of Democratic Action	Party of Democratic Action
Tuzla	Social Democratic Party	Social Democratic Party	Social Democratic Party
Usora	Croatian Democratic Union 1990	Croatian Democratic Union	Croatian Democratic Union
Vareš	Party of Democratic Action	Croatian Democratic Union	Party of Democratic Action
Velika Kladuša	Independent	Labourists	Labourists
Visoko	Party of Democratic Action	Independent	Independent List for Visoko
Vitez	Party of Democratic Action	Croatian Democratic Union	Coalition HDZ-HSS SR-HSP-HKDU
Vogošća	Party of Democratic Action	Party of Democratic Action	Party of Democratic Action
Zavidovići	Party of Democratic Action	Party for Bosnia and Herzegovina	Party of Democratic Action
Zenica	Party of Democratic Action	Independent	Party of Democratic Action
Žepče	Croatian Democratic Union	Croatian Democratic Union	Croatian Democratic Union
Živinice	Party of Democratic Action	Social Democratic Party	Party of Democratic Action

==== By party ====
Party	Mayors in 2012	Mayors in 2016	+/-
SDA/SBB	39	34	▼4
Croatian Democratic Union of Bosnia and Herzegovina	14	19	▲5
Social Democratic Party	10	8	▼2
Croatian Democratic Union 1990	3	2	▼1
Alliance of Independent Social Democrats	3	2	▼1
Civic Alliance	/	1	▲1
Party for Bosnia and Herzegovina	0	1	▲1
Party of Democratic Activity	1	1	Steady
Labour Party of Bosnia and Herzegovina	/	1	▲1
Serbian Progressive Party	0	1	▲1
Croatian Peasant Party of Stjepan Radić	0	1	▲1
Independents	10	12	▲2

=== Republika Srpska ===
==== By municipality ====
Municipality	Mayor's party before election	New elected mayor's party	Relative/absolute winner in municipal or city council
Berkovići	Serb Democratic Party	Serb Democratic Party	Serb Democratic Party
Bijeljina	Serb Democratic Party	Serb Democratic Party	Serb Democratic Party
Bileća	Alliance of Independent Social Democrats	Alliance of Independent Social Democrats	Alliance of Independent Social Democrats
Kostajnica	Serb Democratic Party	Serb Democratic Party	Party of Democratic Progress
Brod	Alliance of Independent Social Democrats	Alliance of Independent Social Democrats	Alliance of Independent Social Democrats
Bratunac	Serb Democratic Party	Serb Democratic Party	Coalition SDA-SBB
Čajniče	Serb Democratic Party	Serb Democratic Party	Serb Democratic Party
Čelinac	Alliance of Independent Social Democrats	Alliance of Independent Social Democrats	Alliance of Independent Social Democrats
Derventa	Alliance of Independent Social Democrats	Alliance of Independent Social Democrats	Alliance of Independent Social Democrats
Doboj	Serb Democratic Party	Serb Democratic Party	Serb Democratic Party
Donji Žabar	Serb Democratic Party	Serb Radical Party	Serb Democratic Party
Foča	Alliance of Independent Social Democrats	Alliance of Independent Social Democrats	Alliance of Independent Social Democrats
Gacko	Serb Democratic Party	Serb Democratic Party	Serb Democratic Party
Banja Luka	Alliance of Independent Social Democrats	Alliance of Independent Social Democrats	Alliance of Independent Social Democrats
Gradiška	Serb Democratic Party	Alliance of Independent Social Democrats	Alliance of Independent Social Democrats
Han Pijesak	Serb Democratic Party	Alliance of Independent Social Democrats	Alliance of Independent Social Democrats
Istočni Drvar	Independent	Independent	Alliance of Independent Social Democrats
Istočna Ilidža	Serb Democratic Party	Serb Democratic Party	Serb Democratic Party
Istočni Mostar	Serb Democratic Party	Serb Democratic Party	Serb Democratic Party
Istočni Stari Grad	Serb Democratic Party	Serb Democratic Party	Serb Democratic Party
Istočno Novo Sarajevo	Alliance of Independent Social Democrats	Alliance of Independent Social Democrats	Alliance of Independent Social Democrats
Jezero	Progressive Srpska Party	Alliance of Independent Social Democrats	Alliance of Independent Social Democrats
Kalinovik	Alliance of Independent Social Democrats	Alliance of Independent Social Democrats	Alliance of Independent Social Democrats
Kneževo	Independent	Independent	Alliance of Independent Social Democrats
Kozarska Dubica	Democratic People's Alliance	Alliance of Independent Social Democrats	Alliance of Independent Social Democrats
Kotor Varoš	Alliance of Independent Social Democrats	Party of Democratic Progress	Serb Democratic Party
Krupa na Uni	Serb Democratic Party	Democratic People's Alliance	Democratic People's Alliance
Kupres	Alliance of Independent Social Democrats	Alliance of Independent Social Democrats	Alliance of Independent Social Democrats
Laktaši	Alliance of Independent Social Democrats	Alliance of Independent Social Democrats	Alliance of Independent Social Democrats
Ljubinje	Serb Democratic Party	Democratic People's Alliance	Serb Democratic Party
Lopare	Serb Democratic Party	Serb Democratic Party	Serb Democratic Party
Milići	Alliance of Independent Social Democrats	Alliance of Independent Social Democrats	Alliance of Independent Social Democrats
Modriča	Alliance of Independent Social Democrats	Alliance of Independent Social Democrats	Alliance of Independent Social Democrats
Mrkonjić Grad	Alliance of Independent Social Democrats	Alliance of Independent Social Democrats	Alliance of Independent Social Democrats
Nevesinje	Serb Democratic Party	Alliance of Independent Social Democrats	Alliance of Independent Social Democrats
Novi Grad	Alliance of Independent Social Democrats	Alliance of Independent Social Democrats	Alliance of Independent Social Democrats
Novo Goražde	Serb Democratic Party	Alliance of Independent Social Democrats	Alliance of Independent Social Democrats
Osmaci	Serb Democratic Party	Serb Democratic Party	Alliance of Independent Social Democrats
Oštra Luka	Democratic People's Alliance	Democratic People's Alliance	Alliance of Independent Social Democrats
Pale	Serb Democratic Party	Coalition United for Pale	Alliance of Independent Social Democrats
Pelagićevo	Independent	Socialist Party	Croatian Democratic Union 1990
Petrovac	Independent	Democratic People's Alliance	Democratic People's Alliance
Petrovo	Serb Democratic Party	Serb Democratic Party	Serb Democratic Party
Prijedor	Democratic People's Alliance	Democratic People's Alliance	Democratic People's Alliance
Prnjavor	Serb Democratic Party	Alliance of Independent Social Democrats	Alliance of Independent Social Democrats
Ribnik	Democratic People's Alliance	Socialist Party	Alliance of Independent Social Democrats
Rogatica	Serb Democratic Party	Alliance of Independent Social Democrats	Alliance of Independent Social Democrats
Rudo	Serbian Radical Party of Republika Srpska	Serbian Radical Party of Republika Srpska	Alliance of Independent Social Democrats
Šamac	Alliance of Independent Social Democrats	National Democratic Movement	Alliance of Independent Social Democrats
Šekovići	Serb Democratic Party	Socialist Party	Party of Democratic Progress
Šipovo	Alliance of Independent Social Democrats	Alliance of Independent Social Democrats	Alliance of Independent Social Democrats
Sokolac	Serb Democratic Party	Serb Democratic Party	Serb Democratic Party
Srbac	Socialist Party	Alliance of Independent Social Democrats	Alliance of Independent Social Democrats
Srebrenica	Independent	Coalition Together for Srebrenica	Coalition SDA-SBB-SBiH
Stanari	Alliance of Independent Social Democrats	Alliance of Independent Social Democrats	Alliance of Independent Social Democrats
Teslić	Serb Democratic Party	Serb Democratic Party	Serb Democratic Party
Trebinje	Party of Democratic Progress	Alliance of Independent Social Democrats	Alliance of Independent Social Democrats
Trnovo	Serb Democratic Party	Alliance of Independent Social Democrats	Alliance of Independent Social Democrats
Ugljevik	Serb Democratic Party	Serb Democratic Party	Serb Democratic Party
Višegrad	Serb Democratic Party	Alliance of Independent Social Democrats	Alliance of Independent Social Democrats
Vlasenica	Serb Democratic Party	Alliance of Independent Social Democrats	Alliance of Independent Social Democrats
Vukosavlje	Party of Democratic Action	Socialist Party	Coalition SDA-SBB
Zvornik	Alliance of Independent Social Democrats	Alliance of Independent Social Democrats	Alliance of Independent Social Democrats

==== By party ====
Party	Mayors elected in 2012 elections	Mayors elected in 2016 elections	+/-
Alliance of Independent Social Democrats	17	30	▲13
Serb Democratic Party	32	16	▼16
Democratic People's Alliance	2	5	▲3
Socialist Party	0	4	▲4
Party of Democratic Progress	1	1	Steady
National Democratic Movement	/	1	▲1
Serbian Radical Party of Republika Srpska	1	1	Steady
Serb Radical Party	/	1	▲1
Independents and coalitions	3	4	▲1

=== Assembly of Brčko District ===
Constituency	Council				Mayor elected by Council		
Constituency	Party	Popular vote	%	Seats	Mayor	Votes	%
Brčko	SDS—NDP	5,908	15.06	5	Siniša Milić, SNSD	21	68%
Brčko	Alliance of Independent Social Democrats	5,512	14.05	4			
Brčko	Party of Democratic Action	4,989	12.72	4			
Brčko	Croatian Democratic Union	3,940	10.04	3			
Brčko	Brčko Democratic Movement	3,247	8.28	2			
Brčko	PDP—NS	2,754	7.02	2			
Brčko	Croatian Peasant Party of Stjepan Radić	2,335	5.95	2			
Brčko	Union for a Better Future	2,049	5.22	2			
Brčko	Social Democratic Party	2,045	5.21	3			
Brčko	Party for Bosnia and Herzegovina	1,780	4.54	1			
Brčko	Socialist Party	1,773	4.52	1			
Brčko	Democratic Front	1,312	3.34	1			
Brčko	Minority candidate Ćazim Dačaj	(384)	—	1			
Total		41,772		31			
