= Daš Radio =

Bosnian radio station

- Bijeljina; Bosnia and Herzegovina
- Broadcast area: Semberija
- Frequencies: Bijeljina 89.2 MHz; Bijeljina 103.5 MHz; Bijeljina 105.5 MHz
- RDS: **DAS**

Programming
- Language: Bosnian
- Format: Local news, talk and music

Ownership
- Owner: M.B. KOMPANI d.o.o.
- Sister stations: Daš Extra Radio

History
- Founded: 1995

Technical information
- Licensing authority: CRA BiH
- Transmitter coordinates: 44°45′25″N 19°12′58″E
- Repeaters: Bijeljina/Silos; Bijeljina/Obrijež; Majevica/Udrigovo

Links
- Website: www.radiodas.net

Daš Radio or Radio Daš is a Bosnian local commercial radio station, broadcasting from Bijeljina, Bosnia and Herzegovina. This radio station broadcasts a variety of programs such as folk music, and local news.

Daš Radio was founded in 1995, and the program is mainly produced in Bosnian. Radio station is available in the city of Bijeljina as well as in nearby municipalities in Semberija and northern parts of the Tuzla Canton area. However in Tuzla Canton on 105.5 MHz, it can't be heard clearly or at all due to interference with Obiteljski Radio Valentino, another Bosnian folk radio station.

The owner of the local radio station is the company M.B. KOMPANI d.o.o. Bijeljina, which also operates Daš Extra Radio radio station.

Estimated number of listeners of Daš Radio is around 144.967.

== Frequencies ==
- Bijeljina 89.2 MHz
- Bijeljina 103.6 MHz
- Bijeljina/Majevica 105.5 MHz

== See also ==
- List of radio stations in Bosnia and Herzegovina
- Daš Extra Radio
- BN Radio
- Bobar Radio
- Bobar Radio - Studio B2
- RSG Radio
