= Nahvioci =

- Village
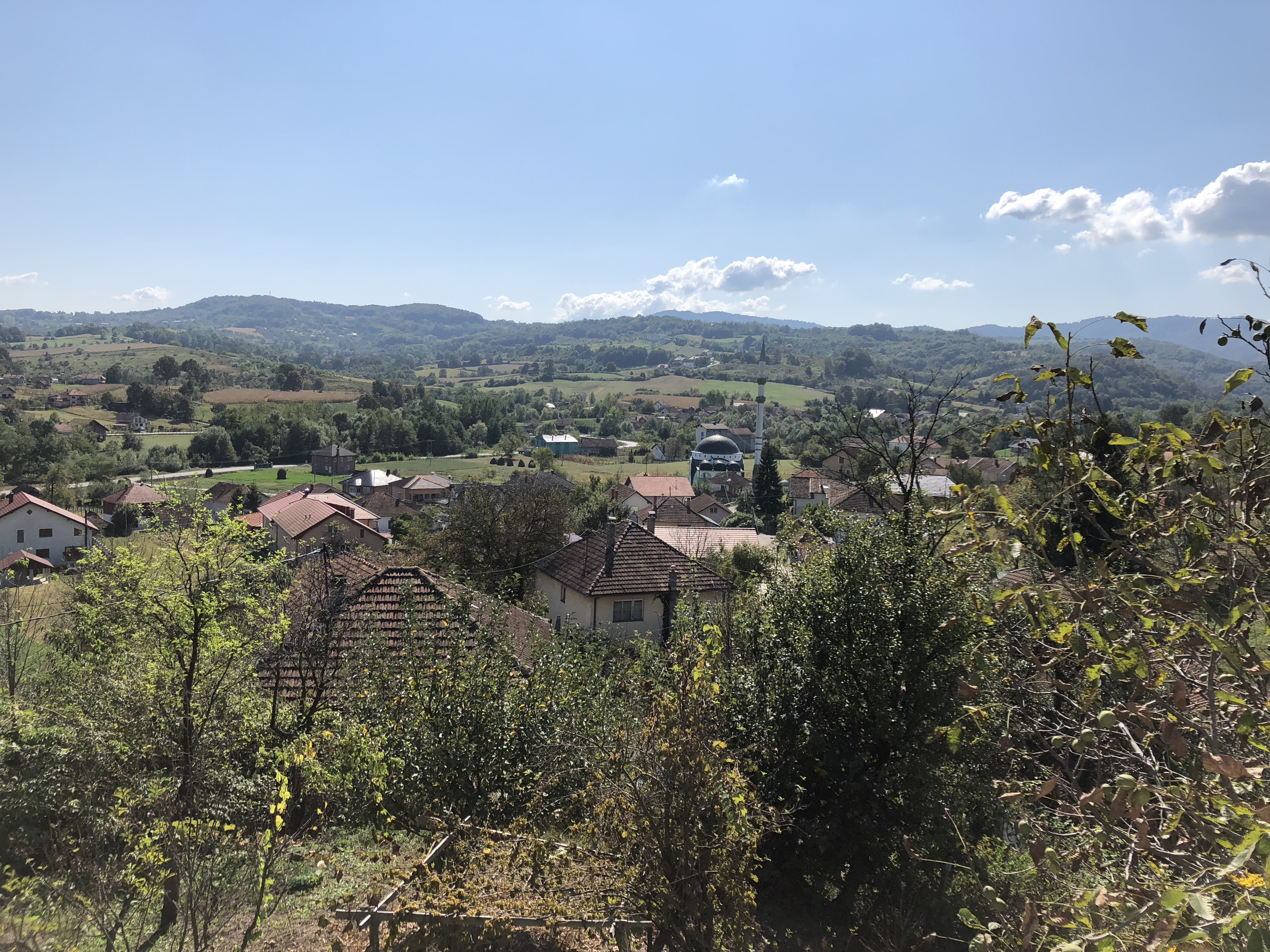

- Location within Bosnia and Herzegovina
- Coordinates: 44.6744349°N 18.7165949°E
- Country: Bosnia and Herzegovina
- Entity: Republika Srpska; Federation of Bosnia and Herzegovina
- Region Canton: Bijeljina; Tuzla
- Municipality: Lopare; Čelić

Area
  - Total: 1.51 sq mi (3.91 km^{2})

Population (2013)
  - Total: 561
  - Density: 372/sq mi (143/km^{2})
- Time zone: UTC+1 (CET)
  - Summer (DST): UTC+2 (CEST)

Nahvioci is a village in the municipalities of Lopare (Republika Srpska) and Čelić, Tuzla Canton, Bosnia and Herzegovina.

== Demographics ==
According to the 2013 census, its population was 561, with 15 of them living in the Lopare municipality, and 546 in the Čelić municipality. Before the Bosnian War, the entirety of Nahvioci was part of the Lopare municipality.

Nahvioci Demographic History
| | 2013. | 1991. |
| Total | 561 | 834 |
| Bosniaks | 542 (96.6%) | 761 (91.2%) |
| Croats | 4 (0.7%) | 14 (1.7%) |
| Serbs | 15 (2.7%) | 1 (0.1%) |
| Yugoslavians | | 5 (0.6%) |
| Other | 0 (0%) | 53 (6.4%) |
