= Daš Extra Radio =

Bosnian radio station

- Bijeljina; Bosnia and Herzegovina
- Broadcast area: Bijeljina
- Frequency: Bijeljina 90.8 MHz
- RDS: DAS 2

Programming
- Language: Bosnian
- Format: Contemporary hit radio
- Network: Daš Radio

Ownership
- Owner: M.B. KOMPANI d.o.o.

History
- Founded: 2007

Technical information
- Licensing authority: CRA BiH
- Transmitter coordinates: 44°45′25″N 19°12′58″E
- Repeater: Bijeljina/Brijesnica

Links
- Website: www.dasextra.ba

Daš Extra Radio or Radio Daš Extra is a Bosnian local commercial radio station, broadcasting from Bijeljina, Bosnia and Herzegovina.

The owner of the local radio station is the company M.B. KOMPANI d.o.o. Bijeljina which also operates Daš Radio radio station.

The programme is produced in Bosnian at one FM frequency (Bijeljina 90.8 MHz) and it is available in the city of Bijeljina as well as in nearby municipalities in Semberija area. This radio station is formatted as urban Top 40 radio.

Estimated number of listeners of Daš Extra Radio is around 65.611.

== Frequencies ==
- Bijeljina 90.8 MHz

== See also ==
- List of radio stations in Bosnia and Herzegovina
- Daš Radio
- BN Radio
- Bobar Radio
- Bobar Radio - Studio B2
- RSG Radio
