= Mirosavci =

- Village
- Location within Bosnia and Herzegovina
- Coordinates: 44.7068402°N 18.799693°E
- Country: Bosnia and Herzegovina
- Entity: Republika Srpska; Federation of Bosnia and Herzegovina
- Region Canton: Bijeljina; Tuzla
- Municipality: Lopare; Čelić

Area
  - Total: 3.68 sq mi (9.52 km^{2})

Population (2013)
  - Total: 338
  - Density: 92.0/sq mi (35.5/km^{2})
- Time zone: UTC+1 (CET)
  - Summer (DST): UTC+2 (CEST)

Mirosavci is a village in the municipalities of Lopare (Republika Srpska) and Čelić, Tuzla Canton, Bosnia and Herzegovina.

== Demographics ==
According to the 2013 census, its population was 338, with 300 of them living in the Lopare part, and 38 in Čelić.

Ethnicity in 2013
Ethnicity	Number	Percentage
Serbs	295	87.3%
Bosniaks	37	10.9%
Croats	1	0.3%
other/undeclared	5	1.5%
Total	382	100%
