= Sanja Vulić =

Bosnian Serb politician and teacher (born 1988)

- Сања Вулић
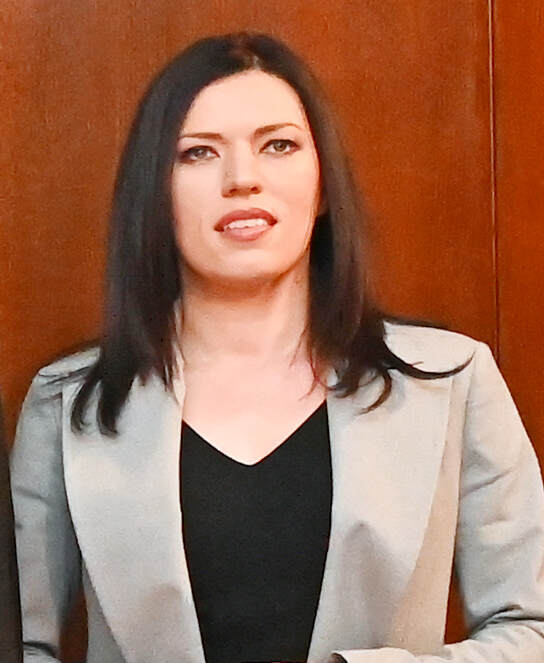
- Vulić in 2024

Member of the House of Representatives
- Incumbent
- Assumed office 16 January 2020
- Preceded by: Vojin Mitrović
- Constituency: 2nd Electoral Unit of RS

Personal details
- Born: Sanja Trifko; 15 August 1988 (age 38) Sarajevo, SR Bosnia and Herzegovina, FPR Yugoslavia
- Party: Alliance of Independent Social Democrats (since 2005)
- Education: University of Banja Luka (dropped out)

Sanja Vulić (née Trifko; born 15 August 1988) is a Bosnian Serb politician. She is currently a member of the House of Representatives of Bosnia and Herzegovina since 2020 as a member of the Alliance of Independent Social Democrats (SNSD). She is the former president of the City Assembly of Doboj.

== Biography ==
Sanja Vulić née Trifko was born on August 15, 1988 in Sarajevo, SFRJ. She grew up in Doboj, becoming a member of the SNSD in 2005, during high school. She was also president of the Young Social Democrats in Doboj. Although she claims to be a primary school teacher by profession, investigations by the Center for Investigative Reporting revealed that while she enrolled in education studies at the University of Banja Luka in Derventa in 2007, she never graduated there or from any other university in Bosnia and Herzegovina. She has declined to comment on her credentials, stating in a House of Representatives session that she was being harassed when questioned about the matter.

She was elected as a councilor in the Doboj City Assembly in the 2012 election and reelected in 2016. In both mandates, she was the president of the SNSD Councilors' Club. After Obren Petrović and Boris Jerinić took over the leadership of the Doboj SNSD, on 28 May 2019, she was elected as the president of the City Assembly.

Since 16 January 2020, she has been a member of the House of Representatives as replacement for Vojin Mitrović, who became Minister of Communication and Traffic.

She was reelected in the 2022, and the 2026 general election. Currently, she is also a member of the Presidency and Main Board of the SNSD.

== Controversies ==
Vulić is known for her strong support of SNSD leader Milorad Dodik.

In 2020, in the House of Representatives, she stated "For me Milorad Dodik isn't Tito, for me he is God", which caused consternation of the members of the House and the public.

In an interview for Alternativna TV in November 2022, she stated: "Of course, I would never in my life allow myself the luxury of criticizing the president. (...) If my dad was Milorad Dodik, I would probably float in the sky, I wouldn't walk on the earth at all."

During the trial of Dodik before the Court of Bosnia and Herzegovina in 2024, she publicly insulted and cursed Judge Sena Uzunović while speaking to the media, resulting in a fine of up to 600 KM.
