= Lopare Selo =

- Village
- Location within Bosnia and Herzegovina
- Coordinates: 44.598735°N 18.7874361°E
- Country: Bosnia and Herzegovina
- Entity: Republika Srpska; Federation of Bosnia and Herzegovina
- Region Canton: Bijeljina; Tuzla
- Municipality: Lopare; Čelić

Area
  - Total: 12.4 sq mi (32.2 km^{2})

Population (2013)
  - Total: 723
  - Density: 58.2/sq mi (22.5/km^{2})
- Time zone: UTC+1 (CET)
  - Summer (DST): UTC+2 (CEST)

Lopare Selo is a village in the municipalities of Lopare (Republika Srpska) and Čelić, Tuzla Canton, Bosnia and Herzegovina.

== Demographics ==
According to the 2013 census, its population was 723, all of them living in the Lopare part, thus none in Čelić.

Ethnicity in 2013
| Ethnicity | Number | Percentage |
|---|---|---|
| Serbs | 715 | 98.9% |
| Croats | 2 | 0.3% |
| other/undeclared | 6 | 0.8% |
| Total | 723 | 100% |
