= Žabar =

Žabar may refer to:

- Žabar, Šabac, a village in Serbia
- Donji Žabar, a village and municipality in Bosnia and Herzegovina
