= 2nd electoral unit of the House of Representatives of Bosnia and Herzegovina (Republika Srpska) =

Parliamentary constituency

2nd electoral unit of Republika Srpska
- House of Representatives of Bosnia and Herzegovina constituency
- Electoral unit within Republika Srpska (Bosnia and Herzegovina)

Current constituency
- Created: 2000
- Seats: 3
- Representatives: Obren Petrović (SNSD); Sanja Vulić (SNSD); Želimir Nešković (SDS)

The second electoral unit of Republika Srpska is a parliamentary constituency used to elect members to the House of Representatives of Bosnia and Herzegovina since 2000. It consists of the municipalities of Derventa, Brod, Vukosavlje, Modriča Doboj, Petrovo, Teslic, Ugljevik, Šamac, Donji Žabar, Pelagićevo, Bijeljina and Lopare as well as the Brcko District.

== Demographics ==
Ethnicity	Population	%
Bosniaks	84,509	19.2
Croats	34,797	7.9
Serbs	310,903	70.7
Did Not declare	2,871	0.7
Others	5,675	1.3
Unknown	706	0.2
Total	439,461	

== Representatives ==
Convocation	Representatives		
2000–2002	Dušаn Stоkić (PDP)	Ljubоmir Коvаčеvić (SDS)	Zоrаn Spаsоjеvić (SDS)
2002–2006	Milorad Živković (SNSD)	Nenad Mišić (SDS)	Borislav Paravac (SDS)
2006–2010	Milorad Živković (SNSD)	Milica Marković (SNSD)	Mirko Okolić (SDS)
2010–2014	Milorad Živković (SNSD)	Milica Marković (SNSD)	Mladen Bosić (SDS)
2014–2018	Miroslav Milovanović (SNSD)	Nenad Lalić (SDS)	Mladen Bosić (SDS)
2018–2022	Vojin Mitrović (SNSD)	Dragan Bogdanić (SNSD)	Obren Petrović (SDS/ SNSD)
2022–2026	Sanja Vulić (SNSD)	Mladen Bosić (SDS)	Obren Petrović (SDS/ SNSD)
2026-2030	Sanja Vulić (SNSD)	Želimir Nešković (SDS)	Obren Petrović (SDS/ SNSD)

== Election results ==
=== 2026 election ===
Party	Votes	%	Mandates
Alliance of Independent Social Democrats	66,64	41.55	2
Serb Democratic Party	27,062	16.87	1
Safe Srpska Movement and allies	20,021	12.48	0
Socialist Party - Democratic Union	10,68	6.65	0
Democratic People's Alliance	7,875	4.91	0
For Justice and Order	6,355	3.96	0
United Srpska	5,172	3.22	0
Party of Democratic Action	4,919	3.06	0
Socialist Party of Srpska	3,972	2.47	0
People's Front	3,344	2.08	0
People and Justice - Social Democrats	1,197	0.74	0
Party for Bosnia and Herzegovina	1,185	0.73	0
Croatian Democratic Union and allies	1,108	0.69	0
The will of the People of Srpska	839	0.52	0

=== 2022 election ===
Party	Votes	Mandates
Alliance of Independent Social Democrats	67941	2
Serb Democratic Party	42237	1
Democratic Union	14905	0
Party of Democratic Progress	14268	0
Socialist Party	10397	0
Party of Democratic Action	9721	0
For Justice and Order	6826	0
Democratic People's Alliance	3928	0
United Srpska	3918	0
Croatian Democratic Union	1090	0
Bosnia and Herzegovina Initiative	990	0
Party of Life	758	0
Union for a Better Future of BiH	629	0
Bosnia and Herzegovina Greens	555	0
Social Democrats	384	0
HDZ 1990	237	0
Re-Balance	107	0
Circle	102	0
Union for New Politics	97	0
The Left Wing	95	0
SMS	77	0

=== 2018 election ===
Party	Votes	%	Mandates
Alliance of Independent Social Democrats	71045	35.96	2
Serb Democratic Party	62236	31.5	1
Party of Democratic Progress	19489	9.86	0
Democratic People's Alliance	12836	6.5	0
Socialist Party	11534	5.84	0
Party of Democratic Action	10020	5.07	0
Social Democratic Party	3369	1.71	0
First Serb Democratic Party	2410	1.22	0
Croatian Democratic Union	2007	1.02	0
Advanced Serb Party	1403	0.71	0
Union for New Politics	905	0.46	0
Lijevo Krilo	212	0.11	0
Party of Democratic Activity	127	0.06	0

=== 2010 election ===
Party	Votes	%	Mandates
Alliance of Independent Social Democrats	70552	36.89	2
Serb Democratic Party	54937	28.72	1
Social Democratic Party	9233	4.83	0
Progressive Democratic Party	8914	4.66	0
Socialist Party	6697	3.50	0
Democratic People's Alliance	5623	2.94	0
Party of Democratic Action	5143	2.69	0
SRS -DR VOJISLAV ŠEŠELJ BIJELJINA	5115	2.67	0
Democratic Party- Drаgаn Čаvić	3808	1.99	0
HSS - NHI	3762	1.97	0
Party for Bosnia and Herzegovina	3080	1.61	0
Advanced Serb Party	2469	1.29	0
SBB BiH	2322	1.21	0
National Democratic Party	2091	1.09	0
Serb Radical Party	1773	0.93	0
Croatian Democratic Union of BiH	1700	0.89	0
Democratic Serb Alliance	1672	0.87	0
New Socialist Party	1399	0.73	0
Patriotic Party	239	0.12	0
Party of Democratic Activity	225	0.12	0
GDS BiH- NEP BiH	214	0.11	0
Social Democratic Union	115	0.06	0
Bosnian Party	103	0.05	0
Total valid	191186	100	

=== 2006 election ===
Party	Votes	%	Mandates
Alliance of Independent Social Democrats	63978	37.62	2
Serb Democratic Party	41744	24.55	1
Progressive Democratic Party	984	5.79	0
Social Democratic Party	6959	4.09	0
Party for Bosnia and Herzegovina	6551	3.85	0
SRS -DR VOJISLAV ŠEŠELJ BIJELJINA	6513	3.83	0
Socialist Party	6397	3.76	0
Party of Democratic Action	5146	3.03	0
Croatian Party of Rights	47	2.39	0
Serbian Radical Party	46	2.36	0
Pensioners' Party- DNS	3844	2.26	0
Serb Democratic Movement	2542	1.49	0
Democratic People's Alliance	2317	1.36	0
People's Party for Work and Betterment	215	1.26	0
New Serbian Force	986	0.58	0
DSS- Serb Democratic Party	813	0.48	0
Patriotic Party	732	0.43	0
Croatian Democratic Union 1990	591	0.35	0
Justice and Morals	249	0.15	0
Youth Political Movement	213	0.13	0
Civil Democratic Party	158	0.09	0
European Ecological Party	125	0.07	0
Democratic People's Union	123	0.07	0
Total valid	151273	100	

=== 2002 election ===
Party	Votes	Mandates
Serb Democratic Party	55815	2
Alliance of Independent Social Democrats	18894	1

=== 2000 election ===
Party	Votes	Mandates
Serb Democratic Party	77193	2
Party of Democratic Progress	27551	1
