= Visori =

- Village
- Location within Bosnia and Herzegovina
- Coordinates: 44.6357184°N 18.7051214°E
- Country: Bosnia and Herzegovina
- Entity: Republika Srpska; Federation of Bosnia and Herzegovina
- Region Canton: Bijeljina; Tuzla
- Municipality: Lopare; Čelić

Area
  - Total: 4.36 sq mi (11.29 km^{2})

Population (2013)
  - Total: 2
  - Density: 0.46/sq mi (0.18/km^{2})
- Time zone: UTC+1 (CET)
  - Summer (DST): UTC+2 (CEST)

Visori is a village in the municipalities of Lopare (Republika Srpska) and Čelić, Tuzla Canton, Bosnia and Herzegovina.

== Demographics ==
According to the 2013 census, its population was 2, both Serbs, both living in the Čelić part, thus none in Lopare.
