= Drijenča =

- Village
- Location within Bosnia and Herzegovina
- Coordinates: 44.6546389°N 18.6900846°E
- Country: Bosnia and Herzegovina
- Entity: Federation of Bosnia and Herzegovina
- Canton: Tuzla
- Municipality: Čelić

Area
  - Total: 7.88 sq mi (20.40 km^{2})

Population (2013)
  - Total: 663
  - Density: 84.2/sq mi (32.5/km^{2})
- Time zone: UTC+1 (CET)
  - Summer (DST): UTC+2 (CEST)

Drijenča is a village in the municipality of Čelić, Bosnia and Herzegovina.

== Demographics ==
According to the 2013 census, its population was 663.

Ethnicity in 2013
Ethnicity	Number	Percentage
Croats	654	98.6%
Bosniaks	2	0.3%
Serbs	1	0.2%
other/undeclared	6	0.9%
Total	663	100%
