= Kosci =

- Village
- Location within Bosnia and Herzegovina
- Coordinates: 44.585098°N 18.7259048°E
- Country: Bosnia and Herzegovina
- Entity: Republika Srpska; Federation of Bosnia and Herzegovina
- Region Canton: Bijeljina; Tuzla
- Municipality: Lopare; Tuzla

Area
  - Total: 1.93 sq mi (5.00 km^{2})

Population (2013)
  - Total: 97
  - Density: 50/sq mi (19/km^{2})
- Time zone: UTC+1 (CET)
  - Summer (DST): UTC+2 (CEST)

Kosci is a village in the municipalities of Lopare (Republika Srpska) and Tuzla, Tuzla Canton, Bosnia and Herzegovina.

== Demographics ==
According to the 2013 census, its population was 97, with none living in the Lopare part, thus 97 in Tuzla.

Ethnicity in 2013
Ethnicity	Number	Percentage
Croats	92	94.8%
Bosniaks	5	5.2%
Total	97	100%
