= Velino Selo, Čelić =

Velino Selo
- Village
- Location within Bosnia and Herzegovina
- Coordinates: 44.7400385°N 18.7100531°E
- Country: Bosnia and Herzegovina
- Entity: Federation of Bosnia and Herzegovina
- Canton: Tuzla
- Municipality: Čelić

Area
  - Total: 3.02 sq mi (7.81 km^{2})

Population (2013)
  - Total: 533
  - Density: 177/sq mi (68.2/km^{2})
- Time zone: UTC+1 (CET)
  - Summer (DST): UTC+2 (CEST)

Velino Selo is a village in the municipality of Čelić, Bosnia and Herzegovina.

== Demographics ==
According to the 2013 census, its population was 533.

Ethnicity in 2013
| Ethnicity | Number | Percentage |
|---|---|---|
| Bosniaks | 532 | 99.8% |
| other/undeclared | 1 | 0.2% |
| Total | 533 | 100% |
