= Jenjić =

- Village
- Location within Bosnia and Herzegovina
- Coordinates: 44.9577094°N 18.7092118°E
- Country: Bosnia and Herzegovina
- Entity: Federation of Bosnia and Herzegovina; Republika Srpska
- Canton Region: Posavina; Doboj
- Municipality: Orašje; Donji Žabar

Area
  - Total: 0.92 sq mi (2.37 km^{2})

Population (2013)
  - Total: 97
  - Density: 110/sq mi (41/km^{2})
- Time zone: UTC+1 (CET)
  - Summer (DST): UTC+2 (CEST)

Jenjić is a village in the municipalities of Orašje (Federation of Bosnia and Herzegovina) and Donji Žabar (Republika Srpska), Bosnia and Herzegovina.

== Demographics ==
According to the 2013 census, its population was 97, all Croats, with 74 living in the Donji Žabar part and 23 in the Orašje part.
