= Miladići =

- Village
- Location within Bosnia and Herzegovina
- Coordinates: 44.6925641°N 18.7074091°E
- Country: Bosnia and Herzegovina
- Entity: Federation of Bosnia and Herzegovina
- Canton: Tuzla
- Municipality: Čelić

Area
  - Total: 1.86 sq mi (4.83 km^{2})

Population (2013)
  - Total: 65
  - Density: 35/sq mi (13/km^{2})
- Time zone: UTC+1 (CET)
  - Summer (DST): UTC+2 (CEST)

Miladići is a village in the municipality of Čelić, Bosnia and Herzegovina.

== Demographics ==
According to the 2013 census, its population was 65.

Ethnicity in 2013
Ethnicity	Number	Percentage
Serbs	40	61.5%
Bosniaks	24	36.9%
other/undeclared	1	1.5%
Total	65	100%
