= Kolimer =

- Village
- Location within Bosnia and Herzegovina
- Coordinates: 44.5454391°N 18.8113534°E
- Country: Bosnia and Herzegovina
- Entity: Republika Srpska; Federation of Bosnia and Herzegovina
- Region Canton: Bijeljina; Tuzla
- Municipality: Lopare; Tuzla

Area
  - Total: 2.37 sq mi (6.14 km^{2})

Population (2013)
  - Total: 18
  - Density: 7.6/sq mi (2.9/km^{2})
- Time zone: UTC+1 (CET)
  - Summer (DST): UTC+2 (CEST)

Kolimer is a village in the municipalities of Lopare (Republika Srpska) and Tuzla, Tuzla Canton, Bosnia and Herzegovina.

== Demographics ==
According to the 2013 census, its population was 18, all Serbs, with none living in the Lopare part, thus 18 in Tuzla.
