= BN Televizija =

Bosnian TV channel

- Country: Bosnia and Herzegovina
- Headquarters: Bijeljina, Bosnia and Herzegovina

Programming
- Language: Serbian language
- Picture format: 16:9 1080i (HDTV)

Ownership
- Owner: RTV "BN" d.o.o. Bijeljina
- Key people: Vladimir Trišić (General Director); Suzana Rađen -Todorić (Head of News)
- Sister channels: BN Music

Links
- Website: www.rtvbn.com

Availability

Terrestrial
- Terrestrial signal: BiH and worldwide

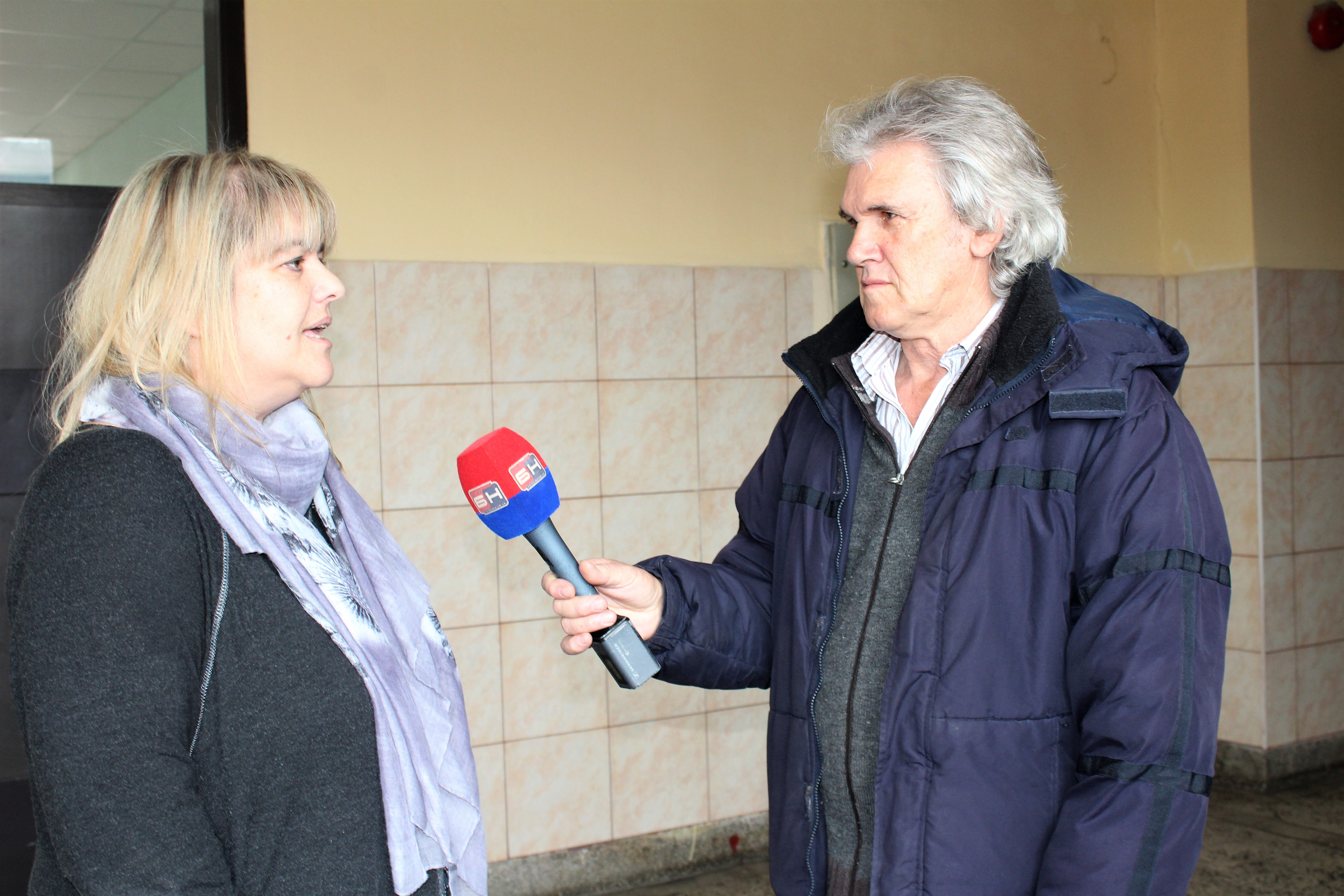
Journalist of BN TV

BN Televizija, RTV BN or BN TV is a Bosnian commercial television channel based in Bijeljina, Bosnia and Herzegovina. The channel is part of the RTV BN television network company, founded on May 5, 1998. It primarily broadcasts in Serbian using the Cyrillic alphabet and offers 24-hour programming with news, political, and entertainment shows. RTV BN is currently the highest-rated TV channel in the Republika Srpska entity and is one of the leading commercial TV channels in Bosnia and Herzegovina.

== Current line-up ==
=== News program ===
- Dnevnik - main news, sport and weather information every day at 16:00 (Dnevnik 1), 19:30 (Dnevnik 2) and around 22:30 (Dnevnik 3)
- Novosti - short news, runs in 10:00, 12:00 and 14:00h
- Danas u Srpskoj - (Today in Srpska) regional news from major cities of Republika Srpska (broadcast at 18:00, Monday to Friday)

=== Talk shows ===
- Globalno (English: Globally) - a political talk show dealing with "global topics from a domestic perspective" hosted by Boris Malagurski. Airs Wednesdays at 8:50 PM.
- Crno na bijelo (English: Black On White) - a political talk show with guests hosted by Suzana Rađen – Todorić. Airs Tuesdays at 9:00 PM.
- Puls - a political talk show with guest and various topics from BiH society. Airs Thursdays at 9:00 PM.
- Granica (English: The Border) - a talk show from Serbian TV station Happy TV.
- Ćirilica - talk show with guests hosted by Milomir Marić, made by Serbian Happy TV.

=== Entertainment ===
- Jutarnji program - Mosaic morning show (broadcast at 06:00, Monday to Friday)
- BN koktel - folk music show with guests
- Kao kod svoje kuće
- Bez maske
- Subotom u 3
- Nedeljno popodne
- Balkanske prevare - controversial reality television show from Serbian RTV Pink
- Ništa lično

=== Foreign series/shows ===
- Larin izbor - Croatian soap opera (Season 2 in cooperation with OBN Televizija)
- Ruža vjetrova - Croatian soap opera (Season 2 in cooperation with OBN Televizija)
- Veliki Brat VIP 5 - reality television show made in cooperation with OBN Televizija
- Zvezde Granda
- Prevrtljivo srce (Hercai) - Turkish drama/romance show

== See also ==
- BN Music
- BN Radio
