= RTV BN =

Television network in Republika Srpska, Bosnia and Herzegovina

- Type: Broadcast radio and television
- Country: Bosnia and Herzegovina
- Availability: Bosnia and Herzegovina and Worldwide
- Motto: Na pravom mjestu u pravo vrijeme! (In the right place at the right time)
- Headquarters: Bijeljina
- Broadcast area: Bosnia and Herzegovina
- Key people: Vladimir Trišić (General Director); Suzana Rađen -Todorić (Head of News)
- Established: 1998
- Radio station: BN Radio
- tv channel: BN Televizija
- cable tv channel: BN Music
- Record label: BN Music
- Callsigns: RTV BN or (Cyrillic: PTB БH)
- Callsign meaning: acronym for Bijeljina
- Official website: www.rtvbn.com

RTV BN (Cyrillic: PTB БH) is a Bosnian radio-television company based in Bijeljina. The company was founded on 5 May 1998 as VIP Productions before renaming to RTV BN in 2009. RTV BN is currently the highest rated TV channel in Republika Srpska entity of BiH. RTV BN has over 200 employees with news correspondents in BiH, Belgrade, London, US and Vienna, as well as other cities. RTV BN is currently available in Europe, North America (USA and Canada), Australia, and New Zealand via satellite.

== Organization ==
- BN Televizija represents a 24-hour TV channel with news, political, and entertainment programs. The primary news program, "Dnevnik 2" is the highest rated primetime news show in Republika Srpska entity.
- BN Music (TV Channel) is a special cable TV channel that broadcasts Turbo-folk music and music shows from BN Radio. This channel is available via cable systems throughout the former Yugoslavia, via satellite and an exclusive IPTV platform offering a special "BN package." The channel has special programs intended for members of the Bosnian and Serbian diaspora living in EU countries.
- BN Radio mainly broadcasts news, popular talk shows and Folk or Turbo-folk music. BN Radio is broadcast on the internet free of charge, and it is available via satellite and IPTV platforms (as BN television channels).
- BN Music is a record label and media distribution company based in Bijeljina, Bosnia and Herzegovina.
