= Mladen Bosić =

Bosnian Serb politician (born 1961)

- Младен Босић
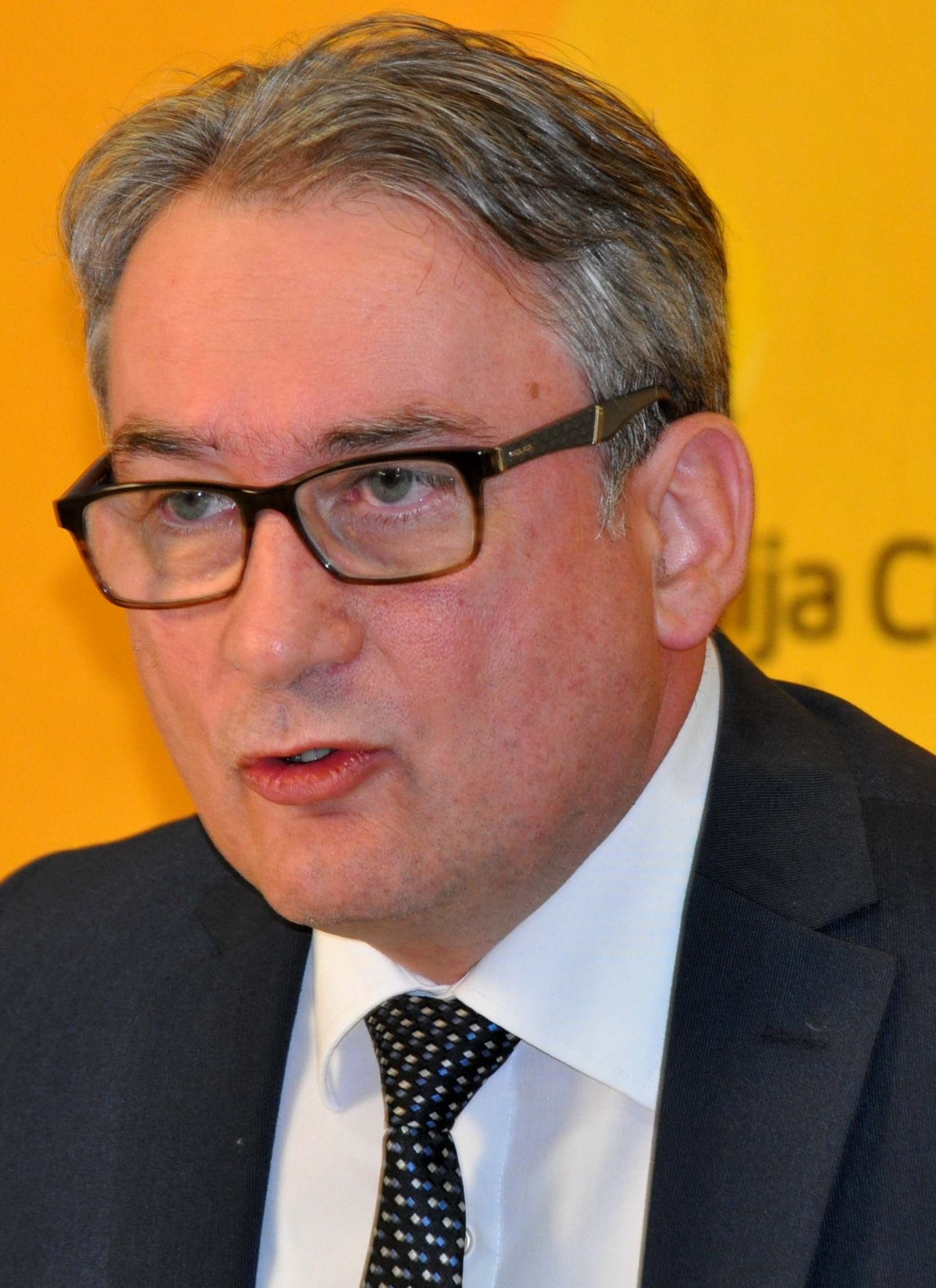
- Bosić in 2016

Member of the House of Representatives
- Incumbent
- Assumed office 1 December 2022
- Constituency: 2nd Electoral Unit
- In office 30 November 2010 – 6 December 2018
- Constituency: 2nd Electoral Unit
Parliamentary offices
Member of the House of Peoples
In office
28 February 2019 – 16 February 2023
Additional positions
President of the Serb Democratic Party
In office 15 December 2006 – 8 October 2016
Preceded by	Dragan Čavić
Succeeded by	Vukota Govedarica

Personal details
- Born: 24 May 1961 (age 65) Brčko, PR Bosnia and Herzegovina, FPR Yugoslavia
- Party: Serb Democratic Party (1992–present)
- Spouse: Ljiljana Bosić
- Children: 2
- Education: University of Belgrade (BS)

Mladen Bosić (Serbian Cyrillic: Младен Босић; born 24 May 1961) is a Bosnian Serb politician who has served as member of the national House of Representatives since 2022, having previously served from 2010 to 2018. He was a member of the national House of Peoples from 2019 to 2023.

Born in 1961 in Brčko, Bosić graduated from the University of Belgrade. He has been a member of the Serb Democratic Party (SDS) since 1992. He served as SDS president from 2006 to 2016. Bosić was elected to the House of Representatives in the 2010 general election, and was re-elected in 2014. He then became a member of the House of Peoples in February 2019, serving until February 2023. Bosić was once again elected to the House of Representatives in 2022.

== Early life and education ==
Bosić was born on 24 May 1961 in Brčko, FPR Yugoslavia, present-day Bosnia and Herzegovina. He finished elementary school in 1976, and high school in 1980 in his hometown. After that, he graduated from the Faculty of Electrical Engineering of the University of Belgrade in 1987.

Between 1988 and 1991, Bosić was the chief development engineer at the "Tesla" battery factory in Brčko, and in 1992 was appointed as the commercial director of Brčko-based Staklomont. From 1992 to 1998, he was the director of PTT (Post, Telegraph, Telephone) Brčko, after which he became the director of the work unit of Telekom Republika Srpska in Brčko.

== Political career ==
A member of the Serb Democratic Party (SDS) since 1992, Bosić served as deputy Minister of Foreign Affairs from 2000 to 2001, after which he was the ambassador to Slovenia until 2004. In December 2006, he became the new president of the SDS, succeeding Dragan Čavić.

In the 2010 general election, Bosić was elected to the national House of Representatives. In May 2012, Bosić stated that he was against the entry of Bosnia and Herzegovina into NATO without Serbia because, according to him, it would "lead to the disruption of military personnel and security forces that are an integral part of the Dayton Agreement." He was re-elected to the House of Representatives in the 2014 general election, obtaining over 50,000 votes.

In October 2016, Bosić resigned as president of the SDS due to the party's poor performance in the 2016 municipal elections. Following the 2018 general election, he became a member of the national House of Peoples in February 2019. He was once again elected to the House of Representatives in the 2022 general election, earning nearly 20,000 votes.

Bosić has been a lingering outspoken critic of Milorad Dodik and his Alliance of Independent Social Democrats, accusing him of authoritarianism, corruption and being responsible for the poor economic condition of Republika Srpska.

== Personal life ==
Mladen is married to Ljiljana Bosić and together they have a son named Nikola, and a daughter named Sandra.
