= Obren Petrović =

Bosnian Serb politician

- Обрен Петровић
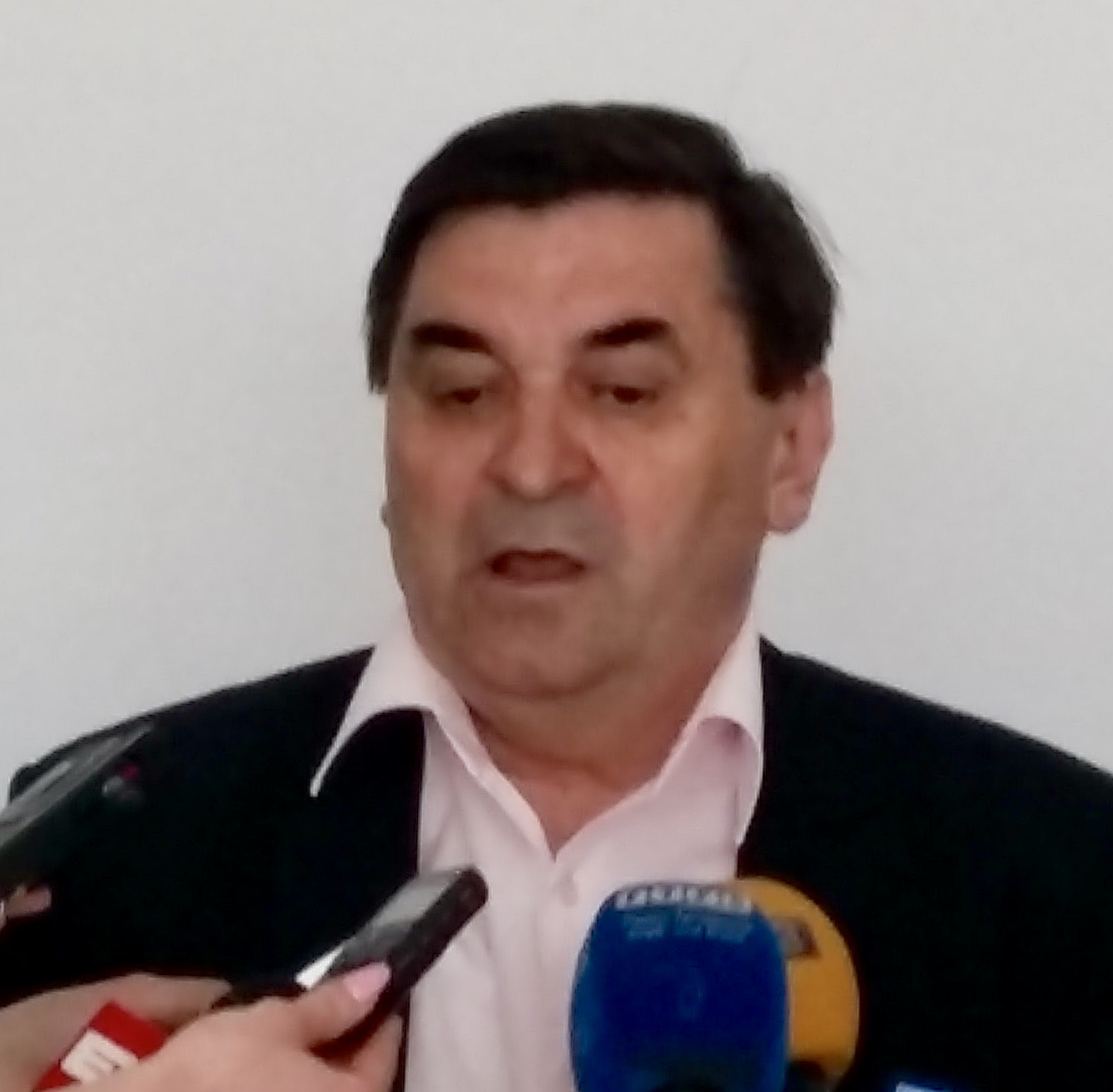

Mayor of Doboj
- In office 2002–2018
- Succeeded by: Boris Jerinić

Member of the House of Representatives of Bosnia and Herzegovina
- Incumbent
- Assumed office 2018
- Constituency: 2nd Electoral Unit RS

Personal details
- Born: 11 May 1957 (age 69) Doboj, PR Bosnia and Herzegovina, FPR Yugoslavia
- Party: Serb Democratic Party (until 2018)
- Education: Faculty of Political Sciences, University of Zagreb
- Occupation: Politician

Obren Petrović (born 11 May 1957) is a Bosnian Serb politician and former mayor of Doboj.

== Biography ==
Petrović finished elementary and high school in Doboj and graduated from the Faculty of Political Sciences Zagreb with M.A. in political science.

During most of his working life, Petrović worked at the Doboj Police Station and he was head of the Civil Protection Department of the Doboj Municipality until his appointment as Mayor of the Municipality in 2002.

The National Assembly of the Republic of Srpska adopted in July 2012 the Law on the City of Doboj, which Doboj ceased to be a municipality and acquired the status of the City, thus making Obren Petrović the first Mayor of Doboj. He has been elected so far in four electoral cycles - from the local elections held in 2004 and 2008, then he was won the mandates of the Mayor of Municipality, to the elections of 2012 and 2016 when he was elected as Mayor of Doboj. In 2018 he was elected in the Parliamentary Assembly of Bosnia and Herzegovina. Petrović gave support to Alliance of Independent Social Democrats, but then got kicked out of the Serb Democratic Party.
