= Žabar, Šabac =

Žabar Жабар (Serbian)
- Village (Selo)
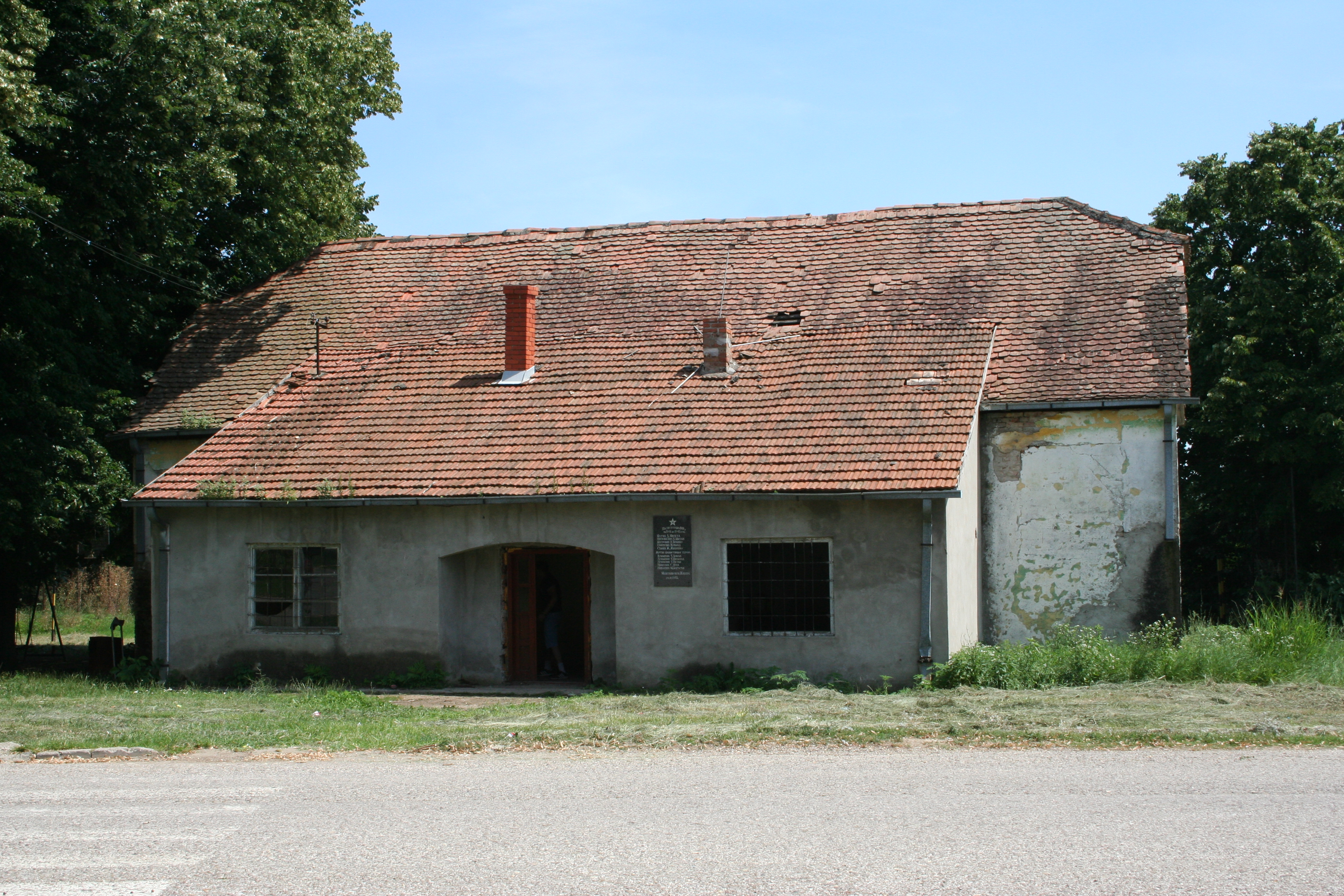

- Location within Serbia
- Coordinates: 44°41′48″N 19°45′52″E
- Country: Serbia
- District: Mačva District
- Municipality: Šabac

Population (2002)
  - Total: 683
- Time zone: UTC+1 (CET)
  - Summer (DST): UTC+2 (CEST)

Žabar is a village in the municipality of Šabac, Serbia. According to the 2002 census, the village has a population of 683 people.
