= Bobar Radio - Studio B2 =

TOP Radio
- Bijeljina
- Broadcast area: Bijeljina
- Frequency: 107.7 MHz
- RDS: TOP
- Branding: TOP Radio

Programming
- Format: Pop, Top 40

Ownership
- Owner: Panorama-pres d.o.o.
- Sister stations: SIM Radio

History
- Former names: Bobar Radio – Studio B2

Links
- Webcast: TOP radio
- Website: topradio.ba

TOP Radio (formerly Bobar Radio – Studio B2) is a Bosnian local commercial radio station broadcasting from Bijeljina, Bosnia and Herzegovina. The station airs a variety of domestic and regional pop music, contemporary hits, and local news.

On May 1, 2026, the station was officially rebranded from Bobar Radio – Studio B2 to TOP Radio under the ownership of Panorama-pres d.o.o., continuing to broadcast on the 107.7 MHz FM frequency in Bijeljina.

== Frequencies ==
- Bijeljina – 107.7 MHz

== See also ==
- List of radio stations in Bosnia and Herzegovina
- Sim Radio
