= BN Radio =

Radio station in Bijeljina, Bosnia

- Bijeljina; Bosnia and Herzegovina
- Frequency: See list

Programming
- Language: Serbian language
- Format: Variety

Ownership
- Owner: RTV BN

History
- First air date: 1995

Technical information
- Transmitter coordinates: 44°45′25″N 19°12′58″E

Links
- Website: www.radiobn.net

BN Radio is a Bosnian commercial radio station, broadcasting from Bijeljina.

BN Radio began broadcasting in 1995 and was formatted as Variety radio station with Folk or Turbo-folk music, talk shows and news. RTV BN is the owner of the BN Radio, together with other 3 TV channels (Analog BN Televizija and Cable BN Televizija, BN Music) and BN Music record label.

== Frequencies ==
The program is currently broadcast on the internet free of charge, and it is available via satellite and 28 frequencies:

- Bijeljina: 93.4 MHz
- Sarajevo: 92.0 MHz
- Posavina: 104.1 MHz
- Banja Luka: 99.9 MHz
- Banja Luka: 105.7 MHz
- Vlašić (Bosnian mountain): 102.4 MHz
- Doboj: 91.6 MHz
- Tuzla: 106.9 MHz
- Zvornik: 93.6 MHz
- Majevica: 93.1 MHz
- Goražde: 94.2 MHz
- Bratunac: 95.8 MHz
- Olovo: 103.2 MHz
- Zvornik: 103.2 MHz
- Vlasenica: 103.2 MHz
- Višegrad: 105.2 MHz
- Šekovići: 105.8 MHz
- Han Pijesak: 106.9 MHz
- Foča: 102.1 MHz
- Srebrenica: 104.4 MHz
- Rogatica: 99.1 MHz
- Ključ, Una-Sana Canton: 101.2 MHz
- Trebinje: 100.5 MHz
- Gacko: 106.9 MHz
- Bileća: 95.3 MHz
- Stolac: 90.5 MHz
- Livno: 105.4 MHz
- Drežnica: 99.3 MHz
- Konjic: 88.4 MHz

== See also ==
- List of radio stations in Bosnia and Herzegovina
