= Semberija =

Region of eastern Bosnia and Herzegovina

Coordinates: 44°48′03″N 19°12′49″E

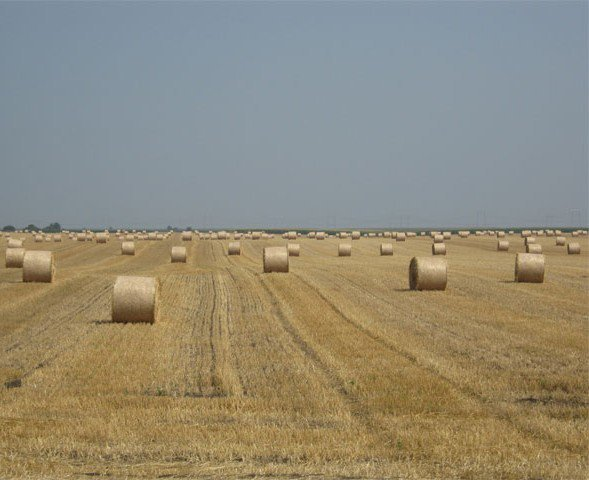
Fields in Semberija

Semberija (Serbian Cyrillic: Семберија, pronounced [sěmbeːrija]) is a geographical region in north-eastern Bosnia and Herzegovina. The main city in the region is Bijeljina. Semberija is located between the Drina and Sava rivers and Majevica mountain. Most of the region is administratively situated in the entity of Republika Srpska, and the smaller part in the entity of Federation of Bosnia and Herzegovina. Semberija has a very rich history. It was first mentioned in 1533 during the Ottoman rule. The name Semberija is of Hungarian origin and probably related to the time of the 12th–16th centuries when this area was occasionally held by the Hungarian Kingdom. Today about 200,000 people live in the area of Semberija, most in the municipality of Bijeljina.

== Municipalities ==
Municipalities in the region of Semberija:

- Bijeljina, 107,715 inhabitants
- Čelić, 12,083 inhabitants
- Lopare, 15,357 inhabitants
- Ugljevik, 15,710 inhabitants

== Gallery ==
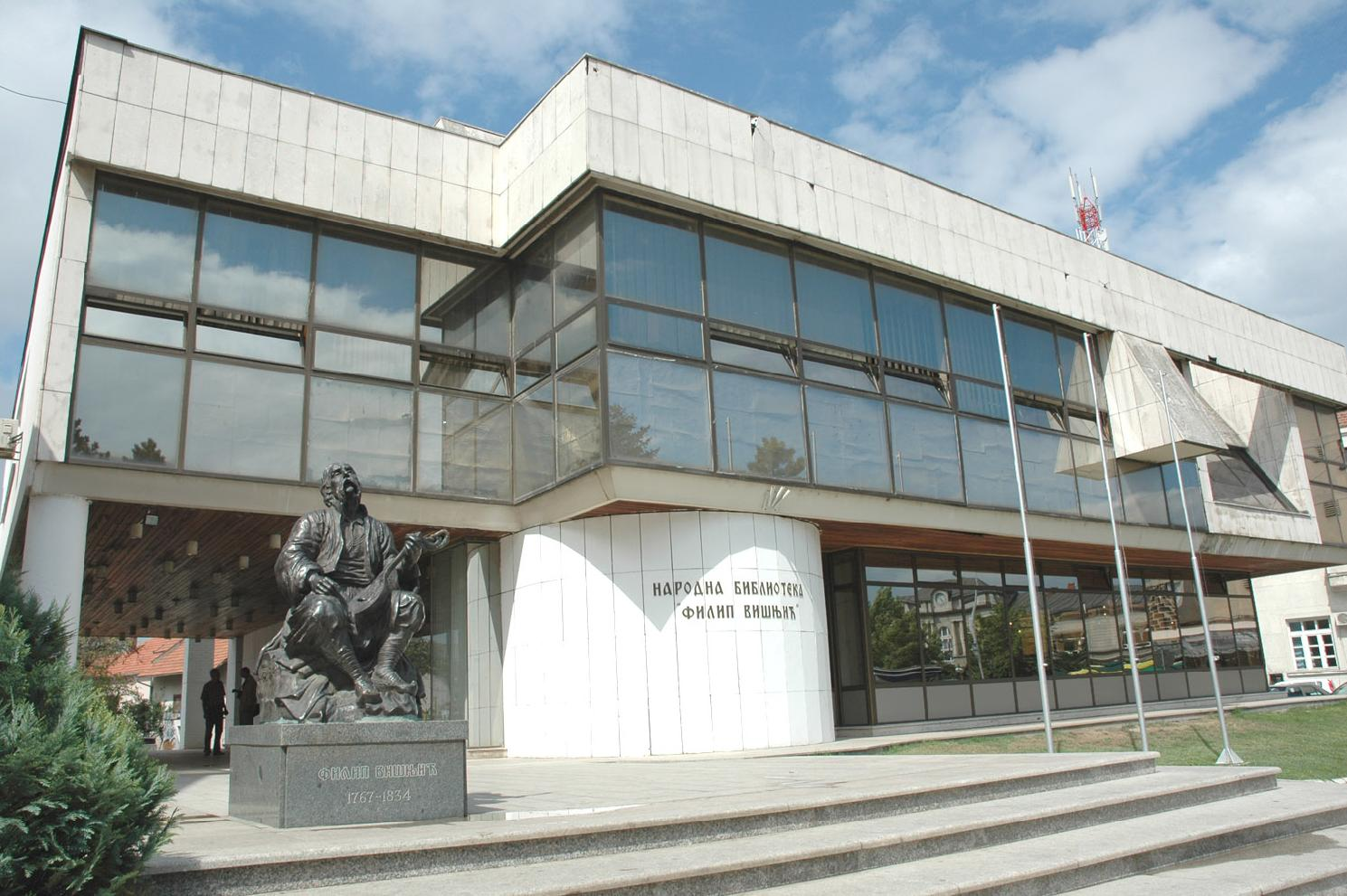
National Library in Bijeljina
