= Donji Žabar =

Village and municipality in Bosnia and Herzegovina

Donji Žabar Доњи Жабар
- Village and municipality
- Location of Donji Žabar within Bosnia and Herzegovina

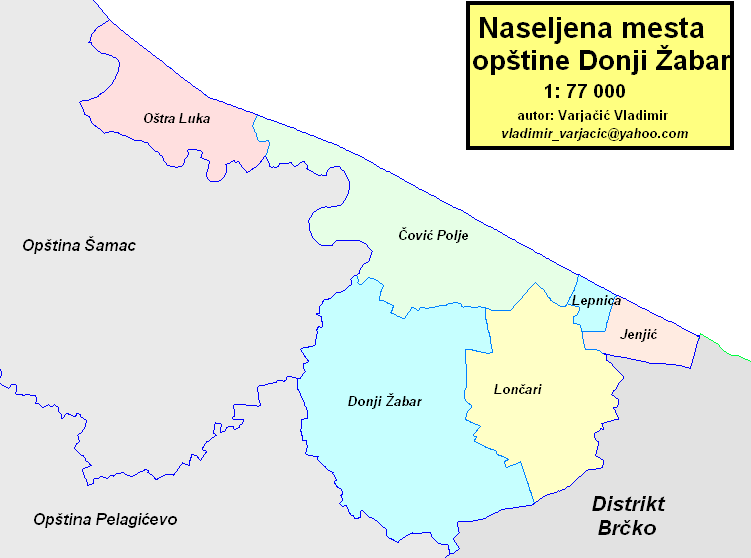
- Coordinates: 44°56′42″N 18°38′38″E
- Country: Bosnia and Herzegovina
- Entity: Republika Srpska
- Geographical region: Posavina

Government
  - Municipal mayor: Pero Pavlović (SNSD)
  - Municipality: 46.76 km^{2} (18.05 sq mi)

Population (2013 census)
  - Municipality: 3,809
  - Municipality density: 81.46/km^{2} (211.0/sq mi)
- Time zone: UTC+1 (CET)
  - Summer (DST): UTC+2 (CEST)
- Area code: 54

Donji Žabar (Serbian Cyrillic: Доњи Жабар) is a village and municipality in Republika Srpska, Bosnia and Herzegovina. As of 2013, it has a population of 3,809 inhabitants, while the village of Donji Žabar has a population of 1,208 inhabitants.

== History ==
Municipality was also known as Srpsko Orašje (Српско Орашје), and was created from part of the pre-war municipality of Orašje (the other part of the pre-war municipality is now in the Federation of Bosnia and Herzegovina).

== Demographics ==
=== Population ===
Population of settlements – Donji Žabar municipality
	Settlement	1971.	1981.	1991.	2013.
	Total			6.171	3.809
1	Čović Polje				627
2	Donji Žabar	1,639	1,513	1,420	1,208
3	Lončari			484	890
4	Oštra Luka				891

=== Ethnic composition ===
Ethnic composition – Donji Žabar
	2013.	1991.	1981.	1971.
Total	1,208 (100,0%)	1,420 (100,0%)	1,513 (100,0%)	1,639 (100,0%)
Serbs	1,196 (99,01%)	1,394 (98,17%)	1,454 (96,10%)	1,622 (98,96%)
Others	5 (0,414%)	8 (0,563%)	4 (0,264%)	1 (0,061%)
Croats	4 (0,331%)	2 (0,141%)	5 (0,330%)	4 (0,244%)
Bosniaks	3 (0,248%)	3 (0,211%)	1 (0,066%)	5 (0,305%)
Yugoslavs		13 (0,915%)	49 (3,239%)	5 (0,305%)
Macedonians				2 (0,122%)

Ethnic composition – Donji Žabar municipality
	2013.	1991.
Total	3.809 (100,0%)	6.171 (100,0%)
Serbs	2.759 (72,43%)	2.782 (45,08%)
Croats	1.029 (27,01%)	3.277 (53,10%)
Others	16 (0,420%)	97 (1,572%)
Bosniaks	5 (0,131%)	15 (0,243%)

== See also ==
- Municipalities of Republika Srpska
