= Lopare =

Lopare Лопаре
- Town and municipality
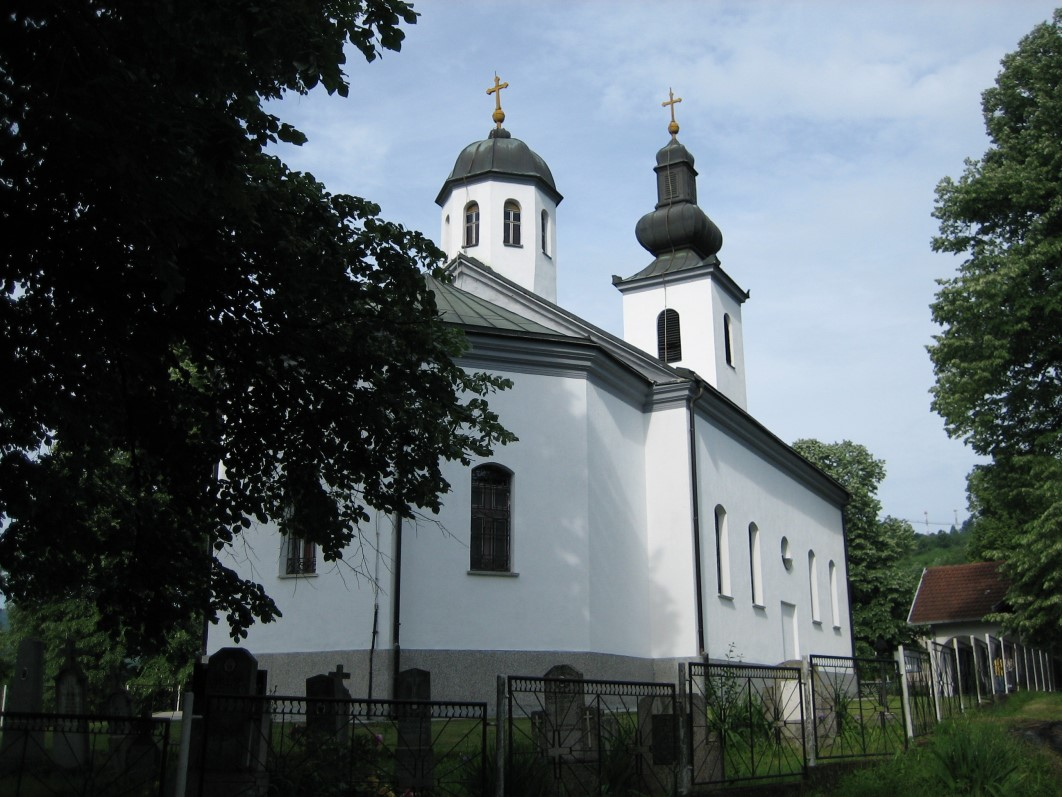
- Lopare

- Flag

- Location of Lopare within Bosnia and Herzegovina

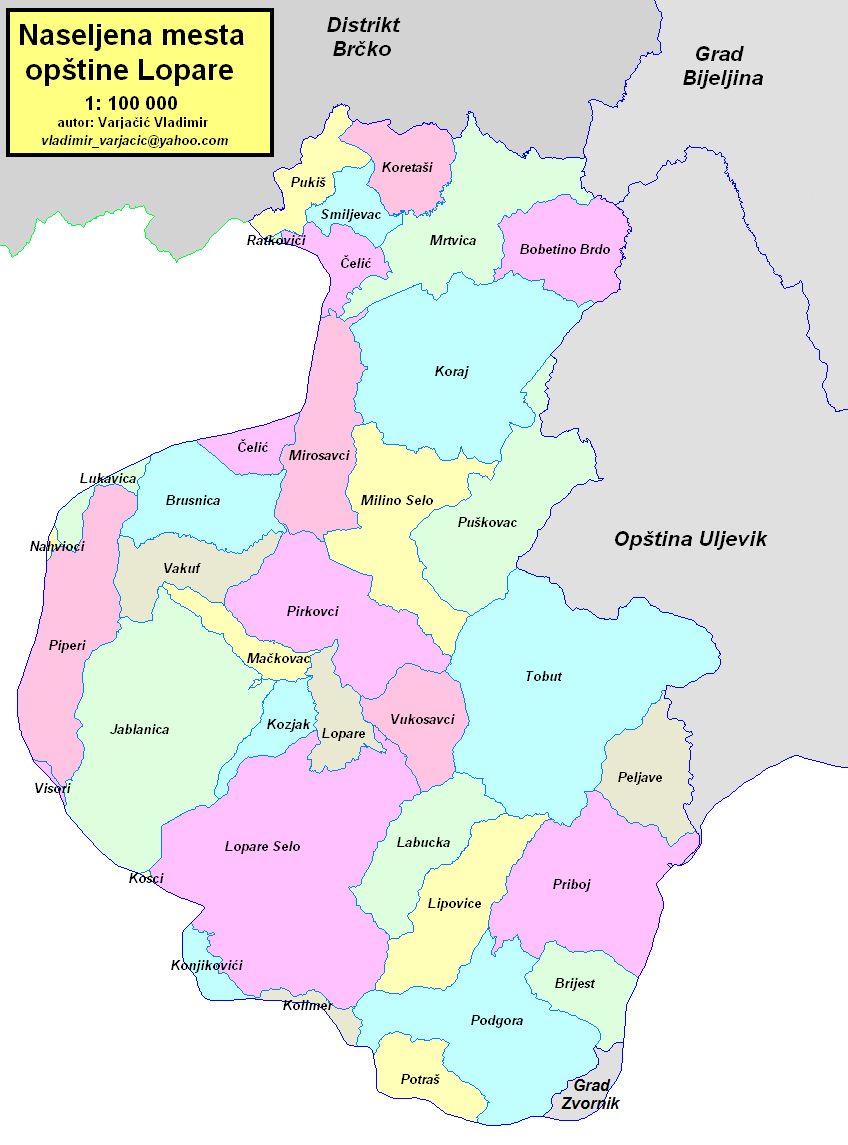
- Coordinates: 44°38′10″N 18°50′40″E
- Country: Bosnia and Herzegovina
- Entity: Republika Srpska
- Geographical region: Semberija

Government
  - Municipal mayor: Rado Savić (SDS)
  - Municipality: 292.55 km^{2} (112.95 sq mi)

Population (2013 census)
  - Town: 2,709
  - Municipality: 15,357
  - Municipality density: 52.494/km^{2} (135.96/sq mi)
- Time zone: UTC+1 (CET)
  - Summer (DST): UTC+2 (CEST)
- Area code: 55

Lopare (Serbian Cyrillic: Лопаре) is a town and municipality in Republika Srpska, Bosnia and Herzegovina. It is situated in the Majevica region. As of 2013, the town has a population of 2,709 inhabitants, while the municipality has 15,357 inhabitants.

== Geography ==
The present Lopare municipality stretches over the area of 299 square kilometers, bordering the municipalities of Ugljevik and Bijeljina in Republika Srpska, Teočak, Sapna, Tuzla and Čelić in the FBiH, as well as the Brčko District.

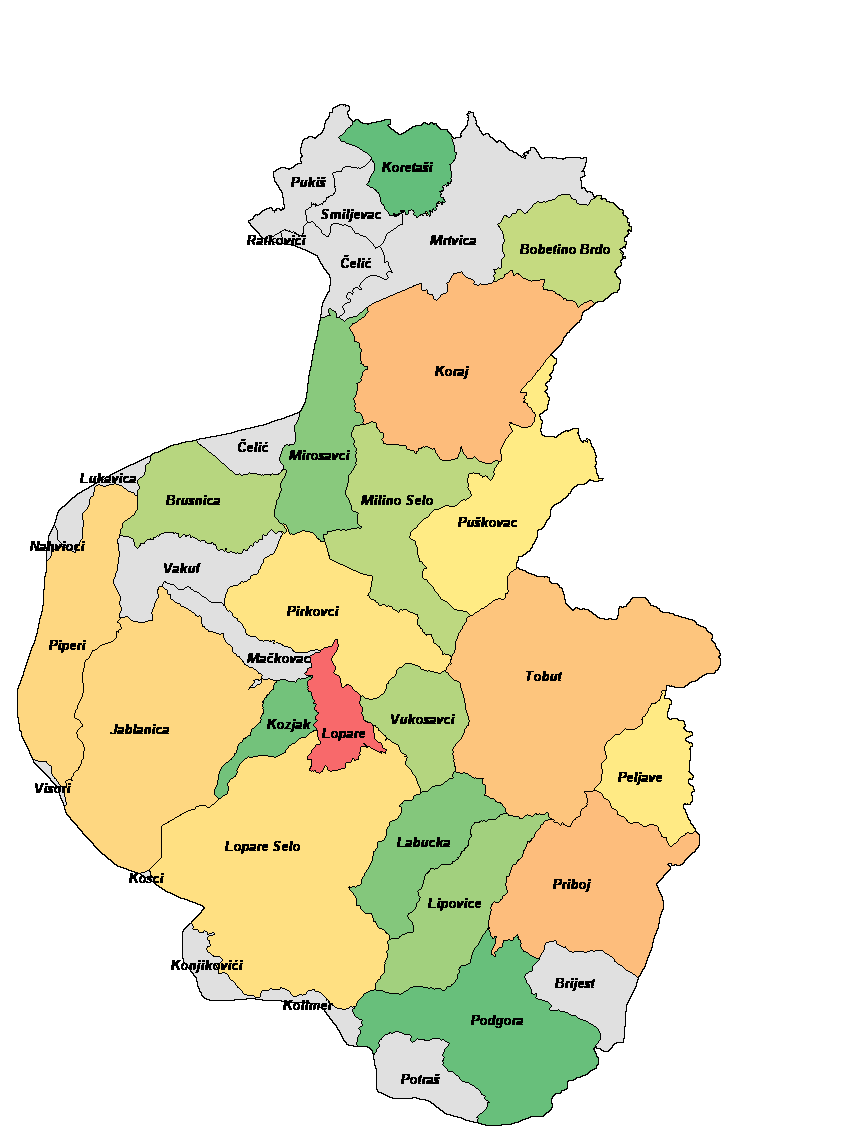
Lopare municipality by population proportional to the settlement with the highest and lowest population

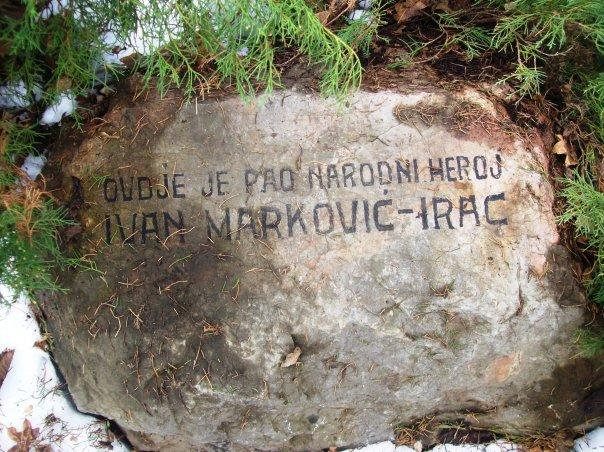
Plaque commemorating the death of the national hero of Yugoslavia Ivan Marković Irac

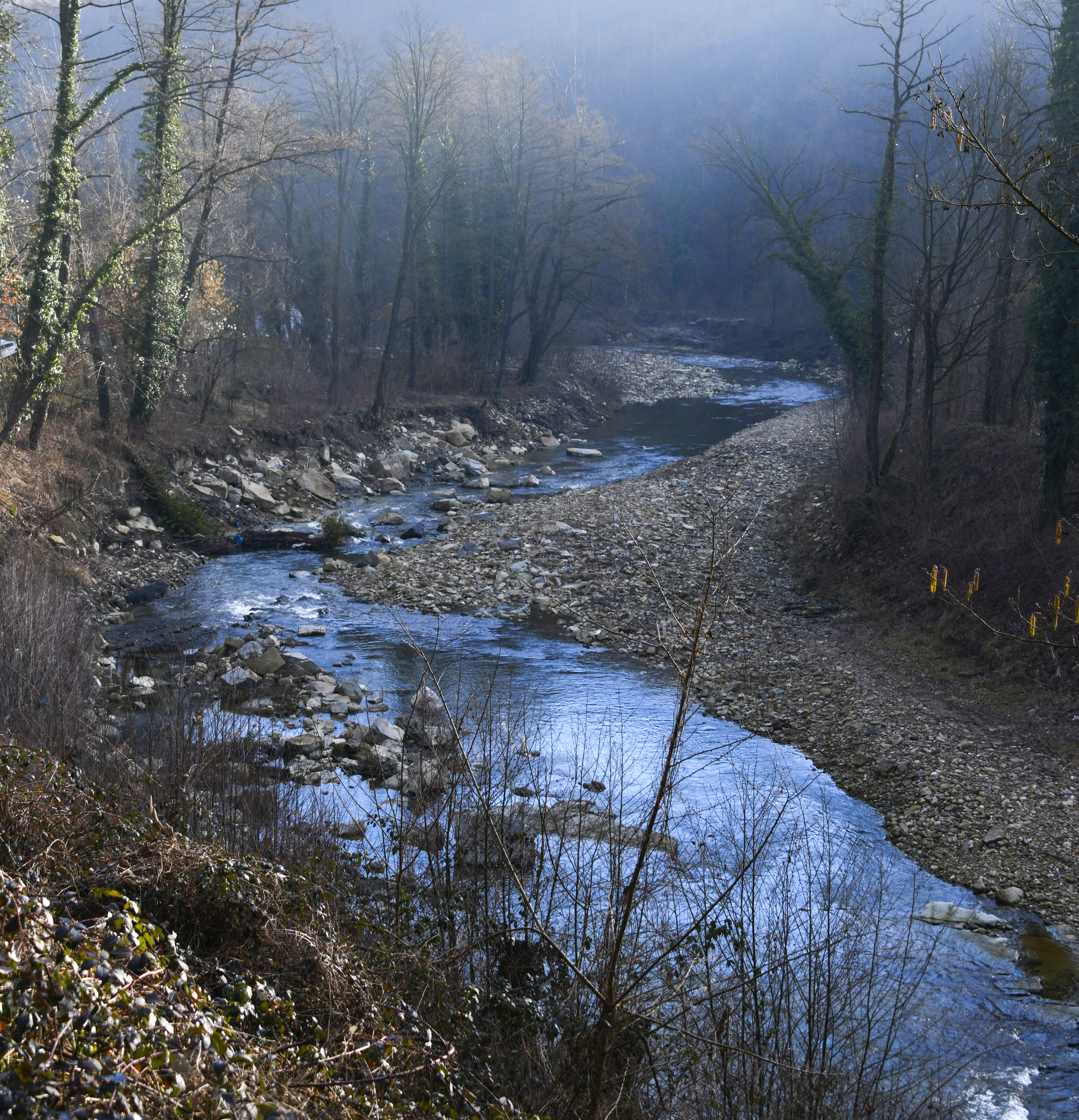
River Gnjica

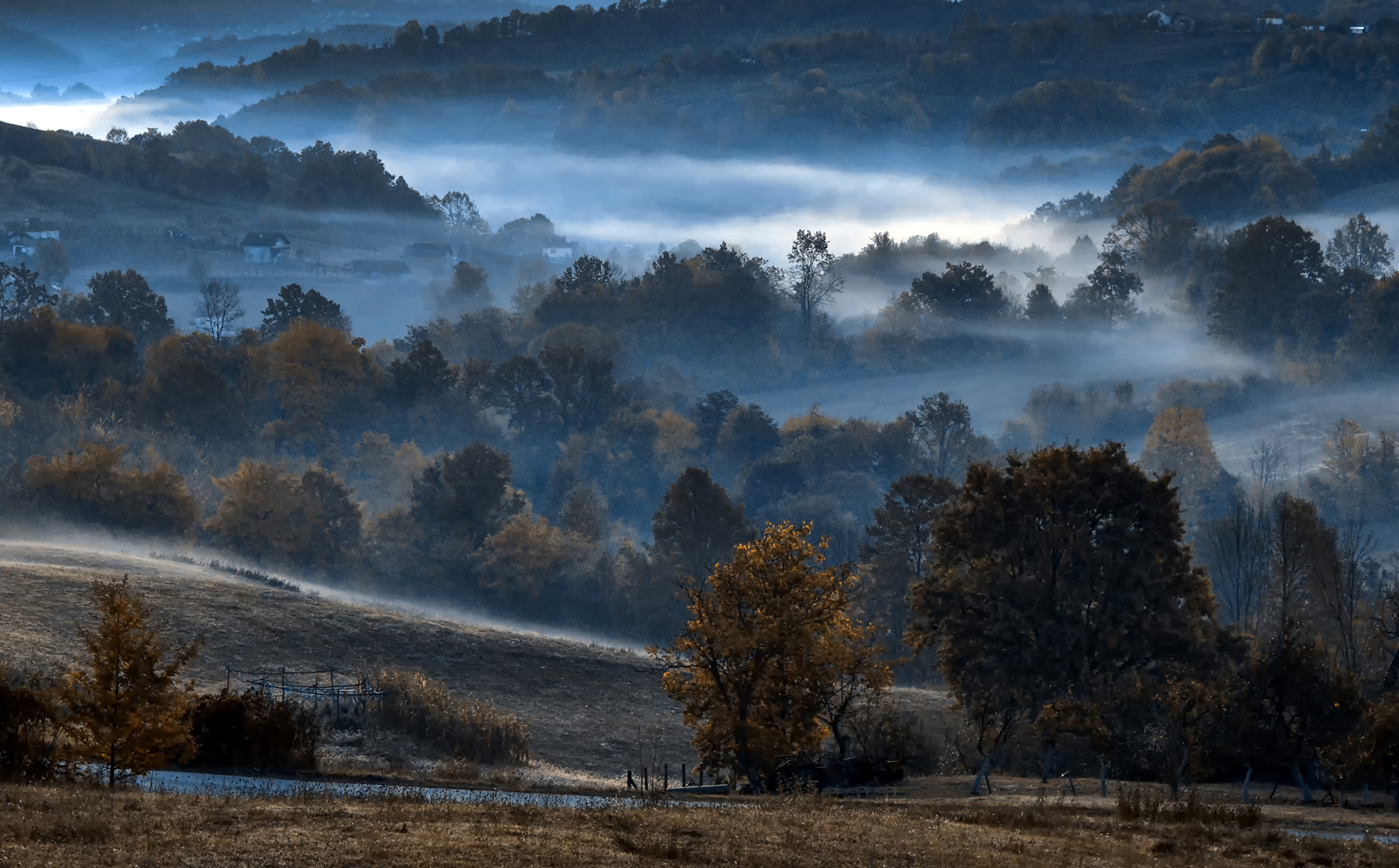
Panorama of Priboj

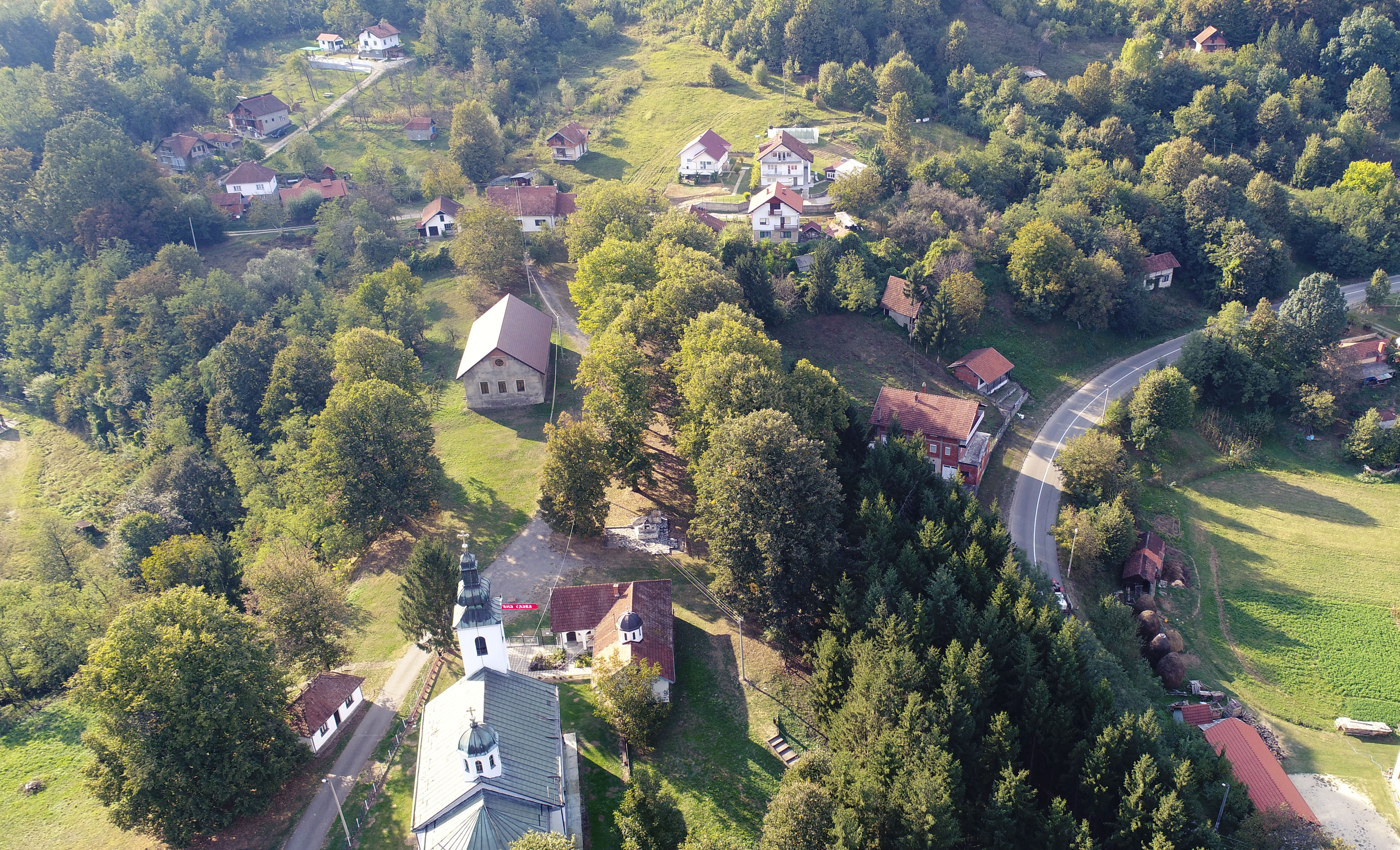
Aerial shot of the village on Lopare municipality

The municipality is located where Mount Majevica transitions into the plains of Semberija and Posavina, and represents the centre of this part of the sub-Majevica area. The entire area is characterized by a large number of smaller watercourses, while the Gnjica River flows through the town of Lopare. The town of Lopare is located at an average altitude of 235 m above the sea level. The municipality has natural resources which include agricultural land, forests and stone, while also having rock salt and coal, to a lesser and unexamined extent.

== Demographics ==
According to the 2013 census results, the municipality of Lopare has a population of 15,357 inhabitants. The municipal territory was reduced by around 30% during the war, as well as that almost one third of the pre-war population now lives in the neighboring municipality of Čelić. During and after the war, significant changes occurred in the demographic structure of the municipality.

=== Population ===
Population of settlements – Lopare municipality
	Settlement	1961.	1971.	1981.	1991.	2013.
	Total		33,847	33,769	32,400	15,357
1	Bobetino Brdo				586	393
2	Brusnica				488	367
3	Jablanica				1,119	850
4	Koraj				2,492	1,312
5	Koretaši				334	213
6	Kozjak				463	244
7	Labucka				362	274
8	Lipovice				391	329
9	Lopare	357	692	966	1,720	2,709
10	Lopare Selo				1,035	699
11	Milino Selo				614	378
12	Mirosavci				578	284
13	Mrtvica				854	532
14	Peljave				620	528
15	Piperi				1,113	845
16	Pirkovci				700	626
17	Podgora				519	223
18	Priboj				1,833	1,285
19	Puškovac				754	498
20	Tobut				1,424	1,146
21	Vukosavci				473	362

=== Ethnic composition ===
Ethnic composition – Lopare town
	2013.	1991.	1981.	1971.
Total	2,709 (100,0%)	1,720 (100,0%)	966 (100,0%)	692 (100,0%)
Serbs		1,417 (82,38%)	667 (69,05%)	556 (80,35%)
Yugoslavs		134 (7,791%)	190 (19,67%)	1 (0,145%)
Bosniaks		114 (6,628%)	75 (7,764%)	95 (13,73%)
Others		38 (2,209%)		3 (0,434%)
Croats		17 (0,988%)	11 (1,139%)	23 (3,324%)
Montenegrins			17 (1,760%)	6 (0,867%)
Albanians			4 (0,414%)	5 (0,723%)
Macedonians			2 (0,207%)	1 (0,145%)
Hungarians				2 (0,289%)

Ethnic composition – Lopare municipality
	2013.	1991.	1981.	1971.
Total	15,357 (100,0%)	32 537 (100,0%)	33,769 (100,0%)	33,847 (100,0%)
Serbs	13,869 (90,31%)	18,243 (56,07%)	19,522 (57,81%)	20,497 (60,56%)
Bosniaks	1,371 (8,928%)	11,990 (36,85%)	11,952 (35,39%)	11,621 (34,33%)
Others	67 (0,436%)	458 (1,408%)	72 (0,213%)	106 (0,313%)
Croats	50 (0,326%)	1,263 (3,882%)	1,608 (4,762%)	1 537 (4,541%)
Yugoslavs		583 (1,792%)	541 (1,602%)	43 (0,127%)
Montenegrins			38 (0,113%)	15 (0,044%)
Albanians			16 (0,047%)	23 (0,068%)
Macedonians			15 (0,044%)	1 (0,003%)
Hungarians			3 (0,009%)	4 (0,012%)
Slovenes			2 (0,006%)	

== Economy ==
The following table gives a preview of the total number of registered people employed in professional fields (as of 2018):

Professional fields	Total
Agriculture, forestry and fishing	45
Mining and quarrying	1
Manufacturing	176
Electricity, gas, steam and air conditioning supply	27
Water supply; sewerage, waste management and remediation activities	15
Construction	32
Wholesale and retail trade, repair of motor vehicles and motorcycles	216
Transportation and storage	40
Accommodation and food services	60
Information and communication	5
Financial and insurance activities	1
Real estate activities	-
Professional, scientific and technical activities	14
Administrative and support service activities	7
Public administration and defense; compulsory social security	161
Education	203
Human health and social work activities	90
Arts, entertainment and recreation	15
Other service activities	25
Total	1,133

== Infrastructure ==
The regional road Tuzla–Brčko and Bijeljina–Tuzla motorway run through the municipality. The length of the categorized road network is 204 km2 on the municipal territory, and there are 333 km of uncategorized roads. While the road network is fairly developed, the number of both categorized and uncategorized paved roads is very small.

== Notable people ==
- Goran Miljanović, football player
- Cvijetin Mijatović, politician, Chairman of the Collective Presidency of Yugoslavia

== See also ==
- Municipalities of Republika Srpska
