= Čelić =

Čelić Челић
- Town and municipality
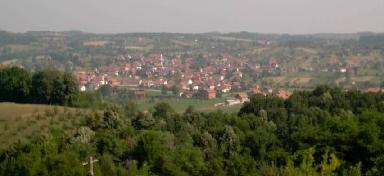

- Location of Čelić

- Location of Čelić
- Coordinates: 44°43′N 18°49′E
- Country: Bosnia and Herzegovina
- Entity: Federation of Bosnia and Herzegovina
- Canton: Tuzla Canton
- Geographical region: Semberija

Government
  - Municipal mayor: Admir Hrustanović (SDP BiH)

Area
  - Town and municipality: 140 km^{2} (54 sq mi)

Population (2013 census)
  - Town and municipality: 10,502
  - Density: 86/km^{2} (220/sq mi)
  - Urban: 3,471
- Time zone: UTC+1 (CET)
  - Summer (DST): UTC+2 (CEST)
- Area code: +387 35
- Website: www.celic.ba

Čelić (Serbian Cyrillic: Челић) is a town and municipality located in the Tuzla Canton of the Federation of Bosnia and Herzegovina, an entity of Bosnia and Herzegovina.

Čelić was part of the municipality of Lopare prior to the war in Bosnia and Herzegovina. The part of the municipality that was controlled by the Army of the Republic of Bosnia and Herzegovina became the municipality of Čelić.

== Geography ==
The municipality is 132 km^{2} (51 sq mi) with a population of 12,000. It is located in the hills of Majevica. Čelić borders the municipalities of Srebrenik, Tuzla, Lopare (RS) and the Brčko District.

== Demographics ==
According to the 2013 census, the population of the municipality was 10,502 and there were 3,436 people living in the urban centre of Čelić. In addition to that, there were also 35 people living in the Lopare part.

=== Ethnic groups ===
The ethnic composition of the municipality:

Municipality	Nationality						Total
Municipality	Bosniaks	%	Croats	%	Serbs	%	Total
Čelić	9,341	88.94	843	8.02	192	1.82	10,502
