= Ministry of defence =

Government department in charge of defence

The building of the Ministry of Defense (Kazakhstan)

A ministry of defence or defense (see spelling differences), also known as a department of defence or defense, is the part of a government responsible for matters of defence and military forces, found in states where the government is divided into ministries or departments. Such a department usually includes all branches of the military, and is usually controlled by a defence minister or secretary of defense. The role of a defence minister varies considerably from country to country; in some the minister is only in charge of general budget matters and procurement of equipment, while in others they are also an integral part of the operational military chain of command.

Historically, such departments were referred to as a ministry of war or department of war, although they generally had authority only over the army of a country, with a separate department governing other military branches. Prior to World War II, most "ministries of war" were army ministries, while the navy and the air force, if they existed as separate branches, had their own departments. As late as 1953, for example, the Soviet Union had a "ministry of war" alongside a "ministry of the navy". The tendency to consolidate and rename these departments, and to coordinate until then mostly separate components of defence (air, land, and navy) arose after World War II.

== Lists of current ministries of defence ==
- Ministry of Defence (Afghanistan)
- Ministry of Defence (Albania)
- Ministry of Defence (Algeria)
- Ministry of National Defence and Homeland Veterans (Angola)
- Ministry of Defense (Argentina)
- Ministry of Defence of Armenia
- Department of Defence (Australia)
- Ministry of Defence (Austria)
- Ministry of Defence (Azerbaijan)
- Ministry of Defence (Bangladesh)
- Ministry of Defence (Belarus)
- Ministry of Defence (Belgium)
- Ministry of Defence (Bosnia and Herzegovina)
- Ministry of Defence and Security (Botswana)
- Ministry of Defence (Brazil)
- Ministry of Defence (Brunei)
- Ministry of Defence (Bulgaria)
- Ministry of National Defence (Cambodia)
- Ministry of Defence (Cameroon)
- Department of National Defence (Canada)
- Ministry of National Defense (Chile)
- Ministry of National Defense (China)
- Ministry of National Defense (Colombia)
- Ministry of Defence (Croatia)
- Ministry of Defence (Czech Republic)
- Ministry of Defence (Denmark)
- Ministry of Defence (Djibouti)
- Ministry of National Defense (Ecuador)
- Ministry of Defense (Egypt)
- Ministry of Defence (Eritrea)
- Ministry of Defence (Estonia)
- Ministry of Defense (Ethiopia)
- Ministry of Defence (Finland)
- Ministry of Armed Forces (France)
- Ministry of National Defence (Gabon)
- Ministry of Defence of Georgia
- Federal Ministry of Defence (Germany)
- Ministry of Defence (Ghana)
- Ministry of National Defence (Greece)
- Ministry of Defence (Guatemala)
- Ministry of Defence (Haiti)
- Ministry of Defence (India)
- Ministry of Defense (Indonesia)
- Ministry of Defence and Armed Forces Logistics (Iran)
- Ministry of Defence (Iraq)
- Department of Defence (Ireland)
- Ministry of Defense (Israel)
- Ministry of Defence (Italy)
- Ministry of Defense (Japan)
- Ministry of Defence (Jordan)
- Ministry of Defense (Kazakhstan)
- Ministry of Defence (Kenya)
- Ministry of National Defence (North Korea)
- Ministry of National Defense (South Korea)
- Ministry of Defence (Kuwait)
- Ministry of Defense (Kyrgyzstan)
- Ministry of Defence (Latvia)
- Ministry of National Defense (Lebanon)
- Ministry of National Defense (Liberia)
- Ministry of National Defence (Lithuania)
- Ministry of National Defense (Madagascar)
- Ministry of Defence (Malaysia)
- Ministry of Defence (Maldives)
- Ministry of Defence (Moldova)
- Ministry of Defence (Mongolia)
- Ministry of Defence (Montenegro)
- Ministry of Defence (Myanmar)
- Ministry of Defence (Namibia)
- Ministry of Defence (Nepal)
- Ministry of Defence (Netherlands)
- Ministry of Defence (New Zealand)
- Ministry of Defence (Nigeria)
- Ministry of Defence (Norway)
- Ministry of Defence (Oman)
- Ministry of Defence (Pakistan)
- Department of National Defense (Philippines)
- Ministry of Defence (Peru)
- Ministry of National Defence (Poland)
- Ministry of National Defence (Portugal)
- Ministry of National Defence (Romania)
- Ministry of Defence (Russia)
- Ministry of Defence (Rwanda)
- Ministry of National Defence (São Tomé and Príncipe)
- Ministry of Defense (Saudi Arabia)
- Ministry of Defence (Serbia)
- Ministry of Defence and National Security (Sierra Leone)
- Ministry of Defence (Singapore)
- Ministry of Defence (Slovakia)
- Ministry of Defence (Slovenia)
- Ministry of Defence (Somalia)
- Ministry of Defence (Somaliland)
- Department of Defence (South Africa)
- Ministry of Defence and Veterans Affairs (South Sudan)
- Ministry of Defence (Spain)
- Ministry of Defence (Sri Lanka)
- Ministry of Defence (Suriname)
- Ministry of Defence (Sweden)
- Federal Department of Defence, Civil Protection and Sport (Switzerland)
- Ministry of Defense (Syria)
- Ministry of Defence (Taiwan)
- Ministry of Defence (Tajikistan)
- Ministry of Defence and National Service (Tanzania)
- Ministry of Defence (Thailand)
- Ministry of Defence (Transnistria)
- Ministry of Defence (Tunisia)
- Ministry of National Defence (Turkey)
- Ministry of Defense (Turkmenistan)
- Ministry of Defence and Veterans Affairs (Uganda)
- Ministry of Defence (Ukraine)
- Ministry of Defence (United Kingdom)
- Department of Defense (United States)
- Ministry of Defense (Uzbekistan)
- Ministry of Defense (Venezuela)
- Ministry of Defence (Vietnam)
- Ministry of Defence (Zambia)
- Ministry of Defence (Zimbabwe)

== Historical ==
- Department of Defence (1901–1921) (Australia)
- Department of Defence (1921–1939) (Australia)
- Department of Defence Co-ordination (Australia, 1939–1942)
- Department of Defence Production (Australia, 1951–1958)
- Department of Defence Support (Australia, 1982–1984)
- Ministry of Defence (Artsakh) (1995–2023)
- Ministry of Defence (Czechoslovakia) (1918–1992)
- Ministry of National Defence (East Germany) (1956–1990)
- Ministry of Defence (Republika Srpska) (1992–2005)
- Ministry of Defense (Soviet Union) (1953–1992)
- Ministry of Defence (1947–1964) (United Kingdom)

== Lists ==
- List of current defence ministers

== See also ==
- Chief of defence
- Commander-in-chief
- Defence diplomacy, the pursuit of foreign policy objectives through the peaceful employment of defence resources and capabilities
- Ministry of War
- Secretariat of National Defense, a government department in Mexico
- War cabinet
