= Chiefs of Joint Staff of the Armed Forces of Bosnia and Herzegovina =

Chairman of the Chiefs of Joint Staff
- Načelnik Zajedničkog štaba Oružanih snaga Bosne i Hercegovine
- Incumbent; General Gojko Knežević since 31 January 2024
- Ministry of Defence
- Member of: Joint Staff
- Reports to: The Presidency
- Appointer: The Presidency
- Formation: 1 January 2006
- First holder: Lt. Col. General Sifet Podžić
- Website: Official website (in English)

The Chiefs of Joint Staff of the Armed Forces of Bosnia and Herzegovina are a group of Chiefs that have command over the Armed Forces of Bosnia and Herzegovina.

== Role and responsibility ==
After the January 2006 abolition of the Army of the Federation of Bosnia and Herzegovina and the Army of Republika Srpska and the creation of the Armed Forces of Bosnia and Herzegovina, the Chiefs of Joint Staff of the Armed Forces of Bosnia and Herzegovina was created.

Currently, their roles include implementing processes of reform and updating the Armed Forces of Bosnia and Herzegovina to provide new structures, rules, and shared beliefs.

== List of chiefs of joint staff ==
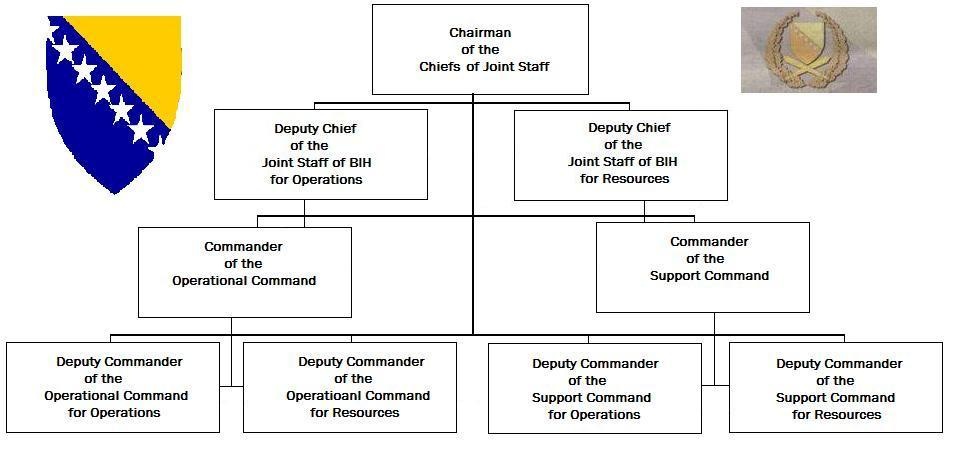
Chiefs of Joint Staff structure

For period from 1918 to 2006, see Chief of the General Staff of Yugoslavia.

No.	Portrait	Chairman of the Chiefs of Joint Staff	Took office	Left office	Time in office	Ref.
1	Sifet Podžić	Lt. Col. General; Sifet Podžić (born 1959)	1 January 2006	20 July 2008	2 years, 201 days	
2	Miladin Milojčić [sl]	Lt. Col. General; Miladin Milojčić (born 1958)	20 July 2008	28 February 2013	4 years, 223 days	
3	Anto Jeleč [sl]	Lt. Col. General; Anto Jeleč (born 1959)	28 February 2013	28 February 2018	5 years	
4	Senad Mašović [sl]	Colonel general Senad Mašović (born 1969)	28 February 2018	31 January 2024	5 years, 337 days	
5	Gojko Knežević	General; Gojko Knežević (born 1962)	31 January 2024	Incumbent	2 years, 225 days	

== See also ==
- Armed Forces of Bosnia and Herzegovina
