= Armed Forces of Bosnia and Herzegovina =

Military of Bosnia and Herzegovina

- Serbo-Croatian: Oružane snage Bosne i Hercegovine, Оружане снаге Босне и Херцеговине
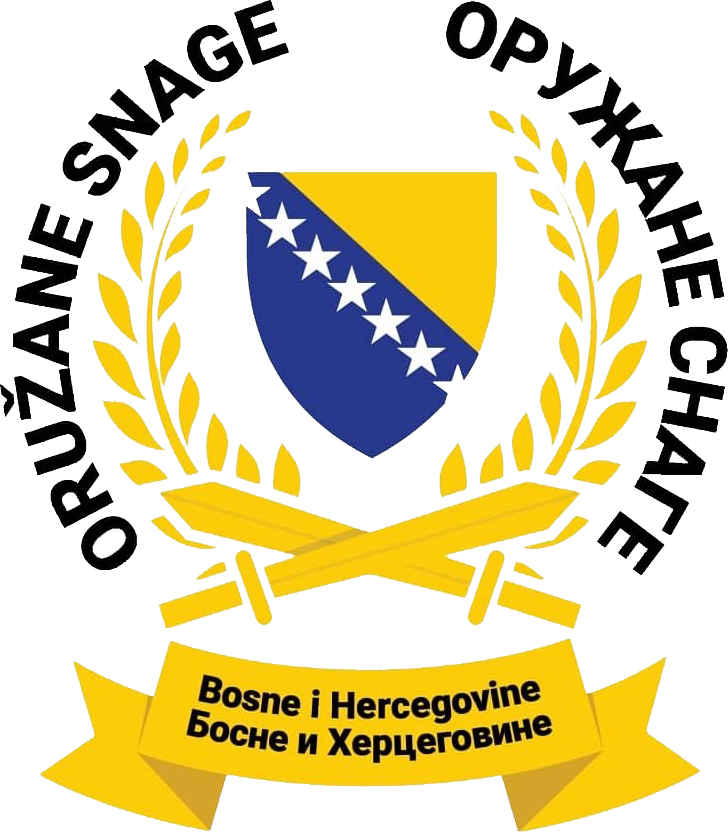
- Emblem of the Armed Forces
- Motto: Perspektiva ("Perspective")
- Founded: 1 December 2005; 20 years ago
- Service branches: Ground Forces; Air Force
- Headquarters: Sarajevo
- Website: os.mod.gov.ba/en/

Leadership
- Presidency: Denis Bećirović; Željka Cvijanović; Darijana Filipović
- Minister of Defence: Zukan Helez
- Chief of Joint Staff: General Gojko Knežević

Personnel
- Military age: 18 years of age
- Conscription: Abolished in 2006
- Active personnel: 18,000
- Reserve personnel: 8,000
- Deployed personnel: 64

Expenditure
- Budget: $220 million
- Percent of GDP: 0.20% (2023)

Industry
- Domestic suppliers: "Zrak" d.d. Sarajevo; PD "Igman" Konjic; Ginex d.d. Goražde "Orao" a.d. Bijeljina; UNIS Promex Sarajevo; BNT Travnik "Binas" d.d. Bugojno; Fabrika specijalnih vozila TRZ Hadžići; PS Vitezit d.o.o.
- Foreign suppliers: European Union; United States; Turkey; United Kingdom; Germany; Croatia; Italy; Norway

Related articles
- History: Army of the Republic of Bosnia and Herzegovina; Army of the Federation of Bosnia and Herzegovina; Army of Republika Srpska; Croatian Defence Council
- Ranks: Military ranks and insignia of Bosnia and Herzegovina

Bosnian Ground Forces
- Active: 2006–present
- Country: Bosnia and Herzegovina
- Branch: Army
- Role: Ground defence of Bosnia and Herzegovina
- Size: 7,300
- Garrison/HQ: Sarajevo
- Motto: "Perspektiva" ("Perspective")

Commanders
- Notable commanders: Brigadir Emir Kliko; Brigadir Zdravko Rezo; Radovan Jović

The Armed Forces of Bosnia and Herzegovina (Serbo-Croatian: Oružane snage Bosne i Hercegovine, Оружане снаге Босне и Херцеговине; abbreviated as OSBiH, ОСБиХ) is the official military force of Bosnia and Herzegovina. The BiH armed forces were officially unified in 2005 by the merging of two separate armies: the Bosniak and Bosnian Croat Army of the Federation of Bosnia and Herzegovina (VFBiH) and the Bosnian Serbs' Army of Republika Srpska (VRS).

The Ministry of Defence of Bosnia and Herzegovina, founded in 2004, is in charge of the Armed Forces of Bosnia and Herzegovina.

== Chain of command ==
In accordance with the Constitution of Bosnia and Herzegovina (Article 5.5a), Bosnian Law of defense and Bosnian Law of service, the supreme civilian commander of the Armed Forces of Bosnia and Herzegovina is the collective Presidency of Bosnia and Herzegovina. The collective Presidency directs the Ministry of Defence of Bosnia and Herzegovina and the Armed Forces. Former Bosnia and Herzegovina ministers of defence include Nikola Radovanović, Selmo Cikotić, Muhamed Ibrahimović, Zekerijah Osmić, Marina Pendeš and Sifet Podžić. As of 2023, the minister is Zukan Helez. Former Chiefs of Joint Staff of the Armed Forces of Bosnia and Herzegovina include Lieutenant colonel general Sifet Podžić, Lieutenant colonel general Miladin Milojčić, Lieutenant colonel general Anto Jeleč and Colonel general Senad Mašović. The current Chief of Joint Staff is General Gojko Knežević. Conscription was completely abolished in Bosnia and Herzegovina effective 1 January 2006.

== Defence law ==
The Bosnia and Herzegovina Defence Law addresses the following areas: the Military of Bosnia and Herzegovina, Government Institutions, Entity Jurisdictions and Structure, Budget and Financing, Composition of Armed Forces of Bosnia and Herzegovina, War Declaration, natural disasters, conflict of interests and professionalism, Oath to Bosnia-Herzegovina, flags, anthem and military insignia, and transitional and end orders.

== History ==
The AFBiH was formed from three armies of the Bosnian War period: the Bosniak Army of the Republic of Bosnia and Herzegovina, the Bosnian Serb Army of Republika Srpska, and the Croat Defence Council.

The Army of the Republic of Bosnia and Herzegovina was created on 15 April 1992 during the early days of the Bosnian War. Before the ARBiH was formally created, there existed Territorial Defence, an official military force of the Republic of Bosnia and Herzegovina, and several paramilitary groups such as the Green Berets, Patriotic League, and civil defence groups, as well as many criminal gangs and collections of police and military professionals. The army was formed under poor circumstances, with a very low number of tanks, APCs and no military aviation assets. The army was divided into Corps, each Corps was stationed in a territory. The first commander was Sefer Halilović.

The Army of Republika Srpska was created on 12 May 1992. Before the VRS was formally created, there were several paramilitary groups such as the Srpska dobrovoljačka garda, Beli Orlovi, as well as some Russian, Greek and other volunteers. The army was equipped with ex-JNA inventory. It had about 200 tanks, mostly T-55s and 85 M-84s, and 150 APCs with several heavy artillery pieces. The Air Defense of VRS shot down several aircraft, like F-16, Mirage 2000, F-18 and one Croatian Air Force MiG-21. The VRS received support from the Yugoslav Army and FR Yugoslavia.

The Croatian Defence Council was the main military formation of the Croatian Republic of Herzeg-Bosnia during the Bosnian War. It was the first organized military force to control the Croat-populated areas, created on 8 April 1992. They ranged from men armed with shotguns assigned to village defence tasks to organized, uniformed, and well-equipped brigade-sized formations that nevertheless employed part-time soldiers. As time went on, the HVO forces became increasingly better organized and more "professional", but it was not until early 1994, that the HVO began to form guards brigades, mobile units manned by full-time professional soldiers.

In 1995–96, a NATO-led international peacekeeping force (IFOR) of 60,000 troops served in Bosnia and Herzegovina, beginning on December 21, 1995, to implement and monitor the military aspects of the Dayton Peace Agreement. IFOR was succeeded by a smaller, NATO-led Stabilization Force or SFOR. The number of SFOR troops was reduced first to 12,000 and then to 7,000. SFOR was in turn succeeded by an even smaller, European Union-led European Union Force, EUFOR Althea. As of 2004, EUFOR Althea numbered around 7,000 troops.

=== The Bosnian Train and Equip Program ===
The program to train and equip the Bosnian Federation Army after the signing of the Dayton Peace Agreement in 1995 was a key element of the U.S. strategy to bring stable peace to Bosnia. The Train and Equip Program also calmed the concerns of some Congressmen about committing U.S. troops to peacekeeping duty in Bosnia. Creating a stable and functioning Federation Army that could deter Serb aggression had the prospect of allowing NATO and U.S. troops to withdraw from Bosnia within the original 12-month mandate, which the administration assured Congress was all it would take to stabilize the country.

Train and Equip Program Donated Resources to the Army of the Federation of Bosnia and Herzegovina as of January 1997.
Country	Funds	Equipment
United Arab Emirates	$15 million	$120 million worth of equipment • 36 pieces of M101 howitzer • 50 AMX-30 tanks and 31 AML-90 armored vehicles • 8 transport vehicles
United States		$109 million worth of equipment and services • 45 M60A3 tanks, 80 M113-A2 armored personnel carriers, 240 heavy trucks • 15 UH-1H helicopters • 116 155mm field howitzers and 840 AT4 light antitank weapons • 1,000 M60 machine guns and 46,100 M16 rifles • JANUS and BBS Command and Staff simulation software • 2,342 radios, 4,100 tactical telephones, binoculars
Saudi Arabia	$50 million	
Kuwait	$50 million	
Brunei	$27 million	
Qatar		$13 million worth of equipment • 25 armored personnel carriers
Malaysia	$10 million	
Egypt		$3.8 million worth of equipment • 16 130mm field guns • 12 122mm howitzers and 18 23mm antiaircraft guns
Turkey		$2 million worth of equipment • 10 T-55 tanks
Total Value: $399.8 million

The program conducted an “international program review” in April 1998 to demonstrate to U.S. partners that it had been well managed and successful and to solicit additional contributions. The event was attended by 20 current and potential donor countries and an air of satisfaction prevailed.

The Dayton Peace Agreement left the country with three armies under two commands: the Bosniak and Bosnian Croat armies within the Federation of Bosnia and Herzegovina, facing their recent adversaries the Army of the Republika Srpska. These three forces together had around 419,000 personnel in regulars and reserves. This force size and orientation was totally at odds with the international peacemakers' vision. Slow reductions did take place. By 2004, the two warring factions had reduced their forces to 12,000 regulars and 240,000 reserves but had made virtually no progress in integrating the two into one new force, though the basis of a state defence ministry had been put in place via the Standing Committee on Military Matters (SCMM). Conscription for periods of around four months continued, the costs of which were weighing down both entities.

The restructuring of the three armies into the Armed Forces of Bosnia and Herzegovina represents part of a wider process of 'thickening' the central state institutions in Bosnia and Herzegovina. To mitigate some of the potential controversy around restructuring, the Office of the High Representative (OHR) made use of evidence of malpractice in Republika Srpska military institutions. Firstly, from 2002 onwards, OHR utilised a scandal around the provision of parts and assistance to Iraq in breach of a UN embargo (the so-called Orao affair) to support the cause for bringing governance of the armies under the level of central institutions. Following this, in 2004, the process was accelerated, drawing its justification from new evidence of material and other forms of support flowing from Republika Srpska armed forces to ICTY indictee Ratko Mladić. OHR condemned the ‘systematic connivance of high-ranking members of the RS military’ and noted that measures to tackle such systematic deficiencies were under consideration. This was quickly followed by the expansion of the mandate for a Defence Reform Commission, which ultimately resulted in the consolidation of three armed forces into one, governed at the level of the central state.

As the joint AFBiH began to develop, troops began to be sent abroad. Bosnia and Herzegovina deployed a unit of 37 men to destroy munitions and clear mines, in addition to 6 command personnel as part of the Multinational force in Iraq. The unit was first deployed to Fallujah, then Talil Air Base, and is now located at Camp Echo. In December 2006, the Bosnian government formally extended its mandate through June 2007. Bosnia and Herzegovina planned to send another 49 soldiers from the 6th Infantry Division to Iraq in August 2008, their mission being to protect/guard Camp Victory in Baghdad.

== Structure ==
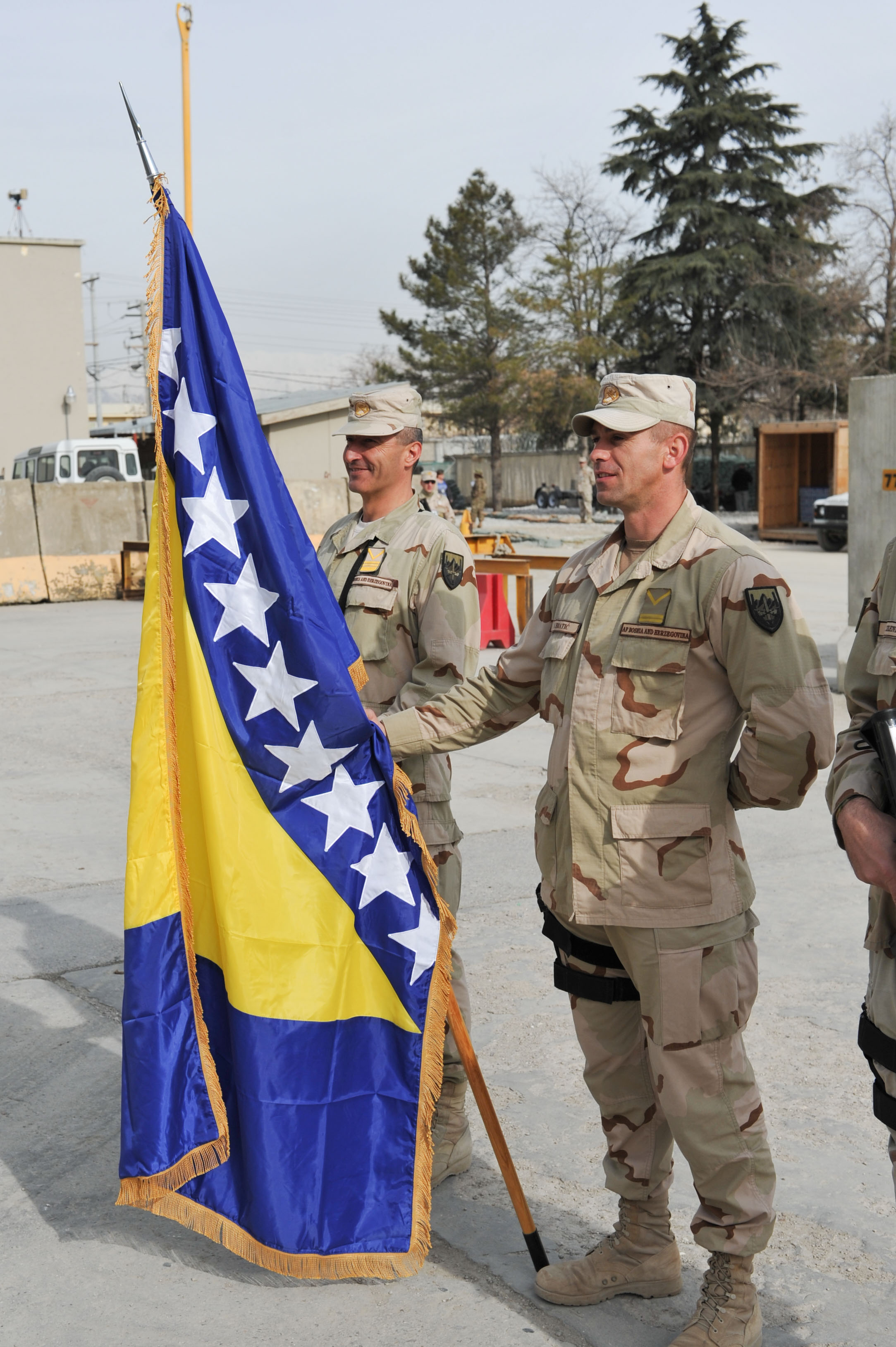
ISAF Bosnian-Herzegovinian troops display their national flag.

The Military units are commanded by the Armed Forces of Bosnia and Herzegovina Joint Staff in Sarajevo. There are two major commands under the Joint Staff: Operational Command and Support Command.

There are three regiments that are each formed by soldiers from the three ethnic groups of Bosnia and Herzegovina: Bosniaks, Croats and Serbs and trace their roots to the armies that were created during the war in BiH. These regiments have their distinct ethnic insignias and consist of three active battalions each. Headquarters of regiments have no operational authority. On the basis of the Law on Service in the Armed Forces of Bosnia and Herzegovina, the regimental headquarters have the following tasks: to manage the regimental museum, monitor financial fund, prepare, investigate and cherish the history of the regiment, the regiment publish newsletters, maintain cultural and historical heritage, give guidance on holding special ceremonies, give guidance on customs, dress and deportment Regiment, conduct officer, NCO and military clubs. Each regiments' three battalions are divided evenly between the three active brigades of the Army.

=== Joint Staff of the Armed Forces of Bosnia and Herzegovina ===
Name	Headquarters	Information	Chief
Operational Command	Sarajevo	The main command center of the Armed Forces of Bosnia and Herzegovina.	Gojko Knežević

=== Operational Command ===
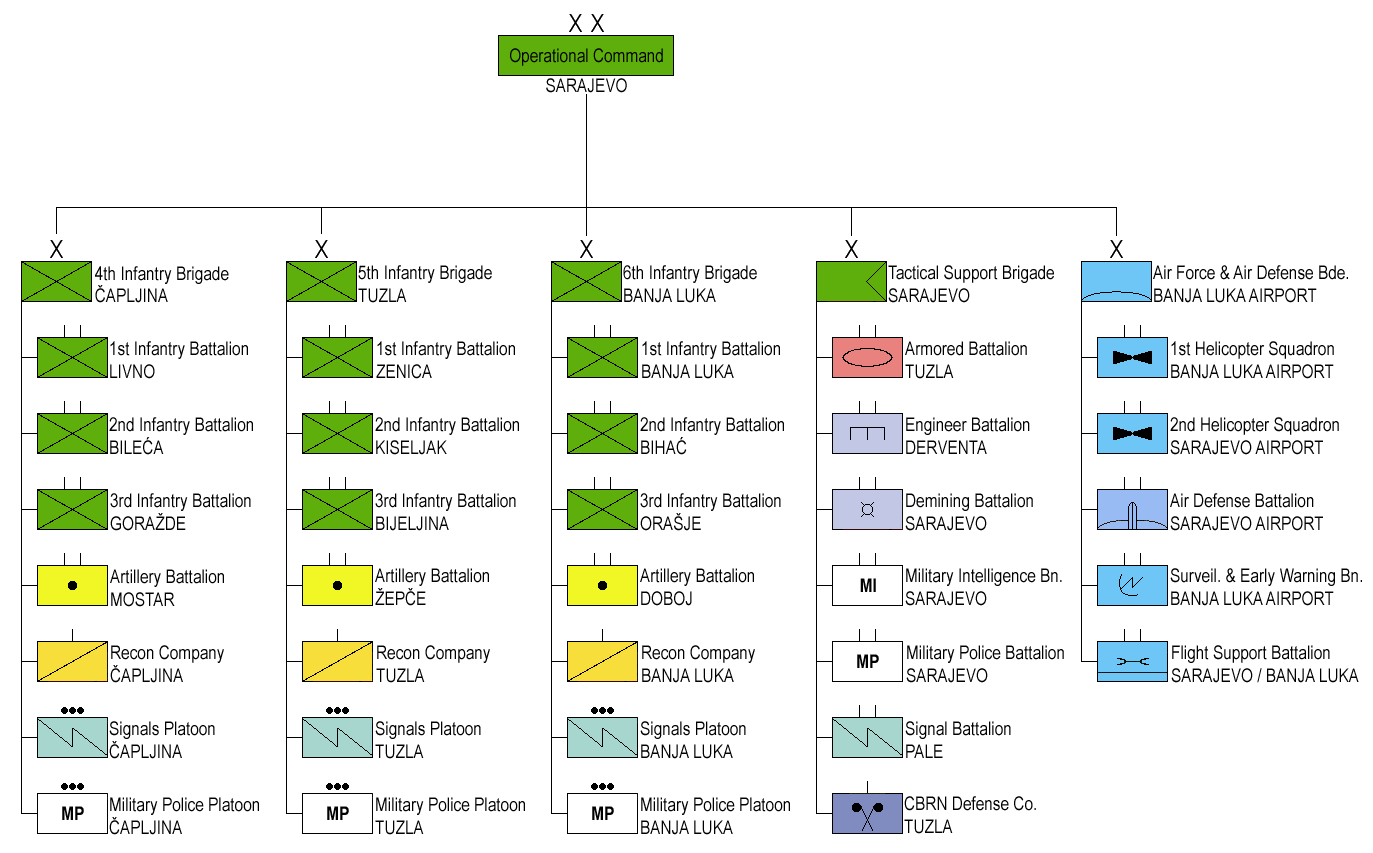
Operational Command organization 2020

Brigade locations 2020: 4th Infantry Brigade 5th Infantry Brigade 6th Infantry Brigade

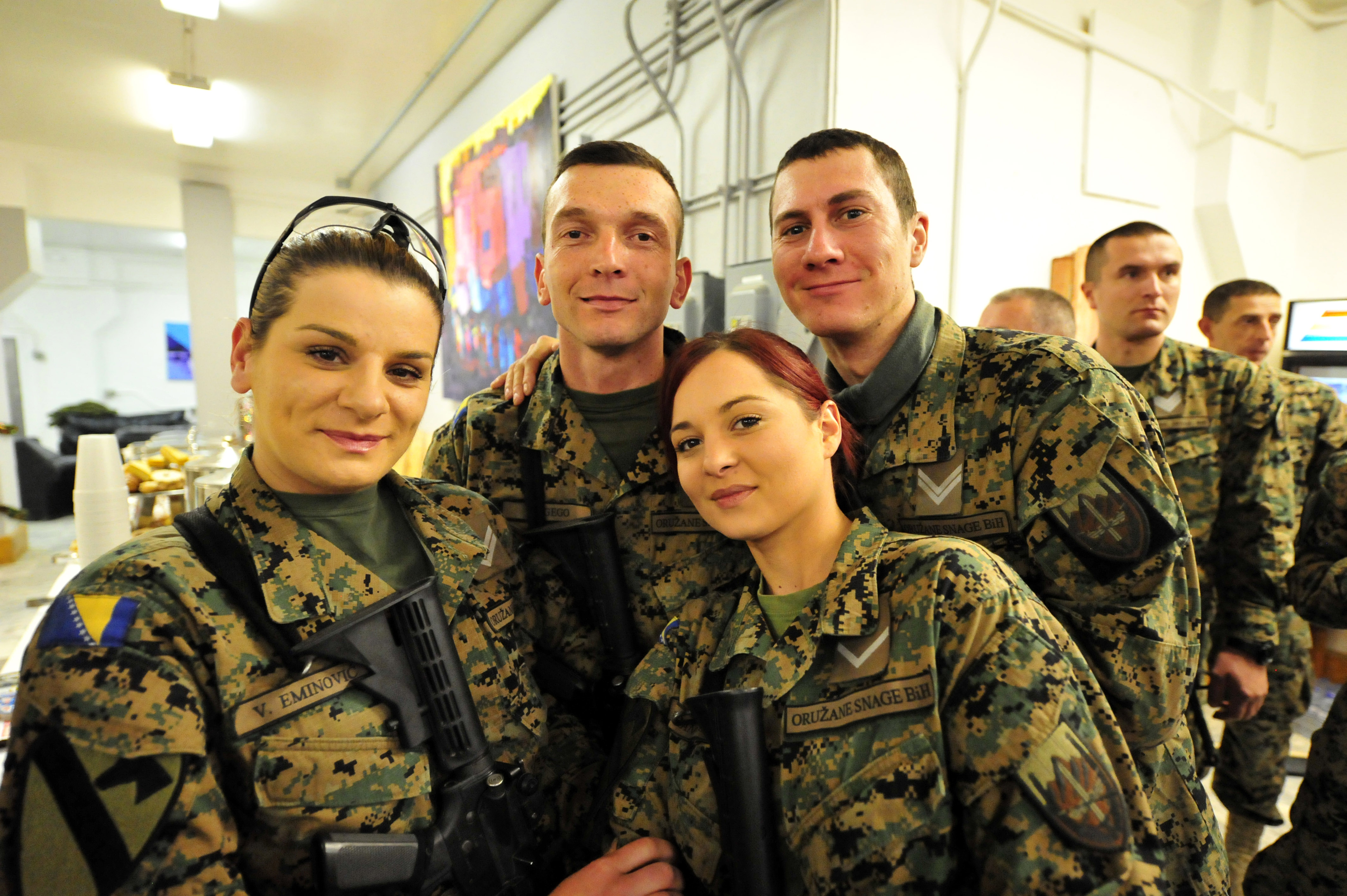
Members of the Armed Forces of Bosnia and Herzegovina's BHAFPC 005, deployed to Bagram AFB.

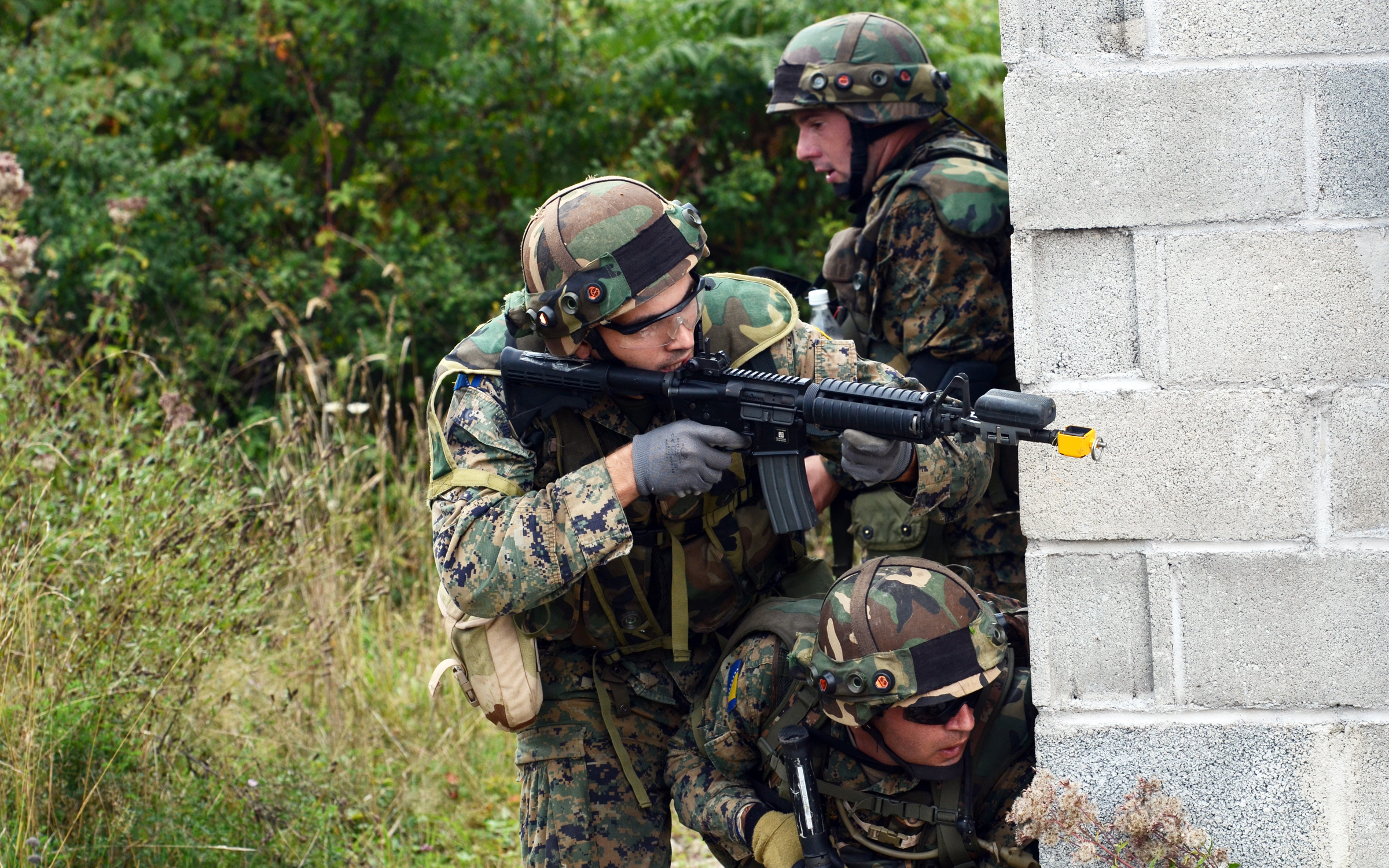
Bosnian Ground Forces during Immediate Response 16 exercise.

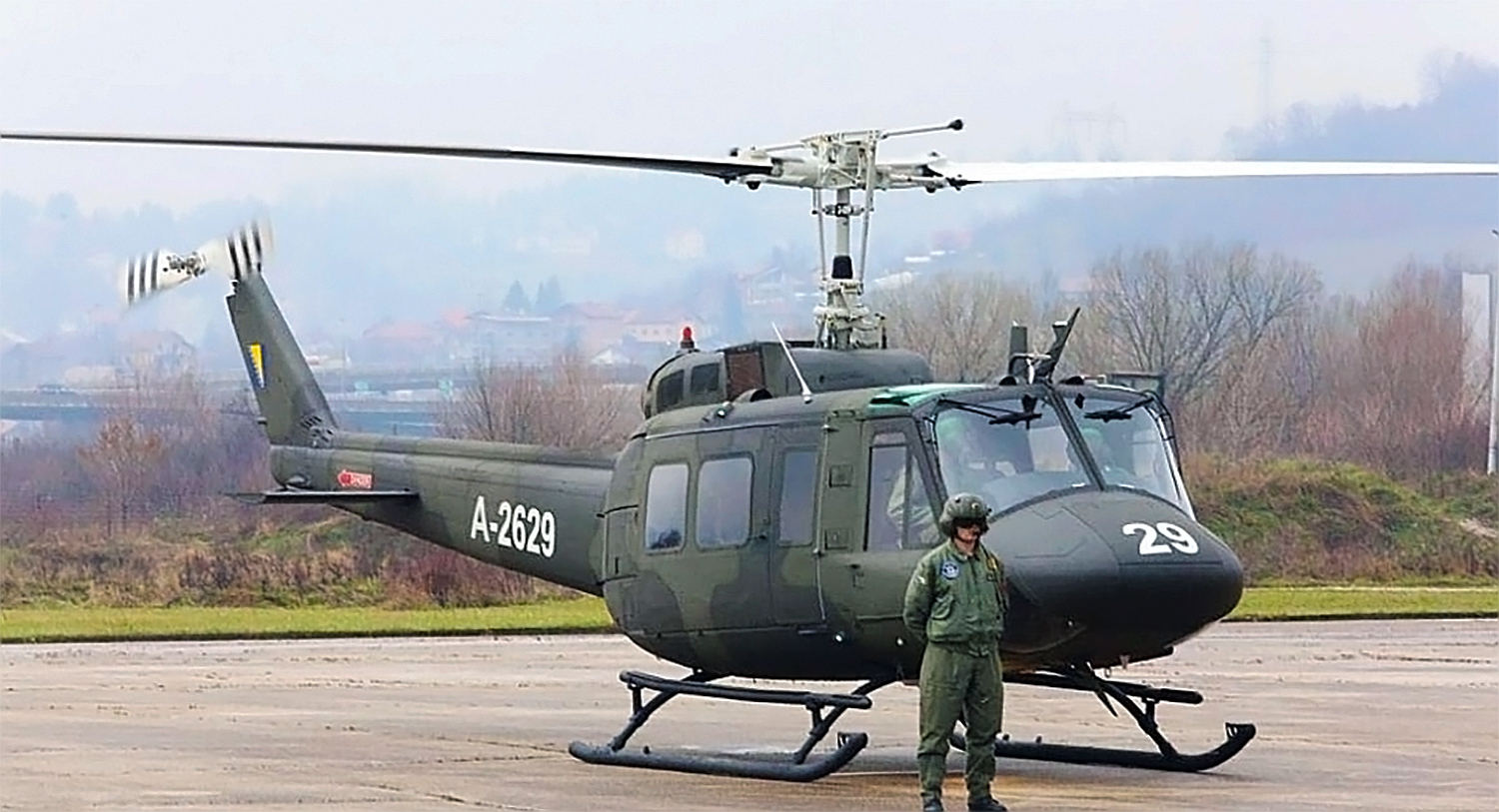
A Bosnian Air Force Bell Huey II (TH-1H) at Rajlovac Air Force Base.

Overall the brigades are multinational with 45.9% Bosniaks, 33.6% Serbs, 19.8% Croats and about 0.7% of other ethnic groups (as for 2016).

- Operational Command, in Sarajevo
  - 4th Infantry Brigade, in Čapljina
    - 1st Infantry Battalion, in Livno (Croat troops)
    - 2nd Infantry Battalion, in Bileća (Serb troops)
    - 3rd Infantry Battalion, in Goražde (Bosniak troops)
    - Artillery Battalion, in Mostar
    - Reconnaissance Company, in Čapljina
    - Signals Platoon, in Čapljina
    - Military Police Platoon, in Čapljina
  - 5th Infantry Brigade, in Tuzla
    - 1st Infantry Battalion, in Zenica (Bosniak troops)
    - 2nd Infantry Battalion, in Kiseljak (Croat troops)
    - 3rd Infantry Battalion, in Bijeljina (Serb troops)
    - Artillery Battalion, in Žepče
    - Reconnaissance Company, in Tuzla
    - Signals Platoon, in Tuzla
    - Military Police Platoon, in Tuzla
  - 6th Infantry Brigade, in Banja Luka
    - 1st Infantry Battalion, in Banja Luka (Serb troops)
    - 2nd Infantry Battalion, in Bihać (Bosniak troops)
    - 3rd Infantry Battalion, in Orašje (Croat troops)
    - Artillery Battalion, in Doboj
    - Reconnaissance Company, in Banja Luka
    - Signals Platoon, in Banja Luka
    - Military Police Platoon, in Banja Luka
  - Tactical Support Brigade, in Sarajevo
    - Armored Battalion, in Tuzla
    - Engineer Battalion, in Derventa
    - Military Intelligence Battalion, in Sarajevo
    - Military Police Battalion, in Sarajevo
    - Demining Battalion, in Sarajevo
    - Signal Battalion, in Pale
    - CBRN Defense Company, in Tuzla
  - Air Force and Air Defense Brigade, at Sarajevo Air Base and Banja Luka Air Base
    - 1st Helicopter Squadron, at Banja Luka Airport
    - 2nd Helicopter Squadron, at Sarajevo Airport
    - Air Defense Battalion, at Sarajevo Airport
    - Surveillance and Early Warning Battalion, at Banja Luka Airport
    - Flight Support Battalion, at Sarajevo Airport and Banja Luka Airport

=== Brigades under the Support Command control ===
Name	Headquarters	Information
Personnel Command	Banja Luka	Training and Doctrine Command (Travnik); Combat Training Center (Manjača); Armored Mechanized Battalion; Combat Simulation Center (Manjača); Professional Development Center (Hadžići); Officers School; NCO School; Military Police School; Foreign Language Center
Logistics Command	Travnik; Doboj	Center for Movement Control; Center for Material Management; Main Logistics Base (Doboj and Sarajevo); 1st Logistics Support Battalion; 2nd Logistics Support Battalion; 3rd Logistics Support Battalion; 4th Logistics Support Battalion; 5th Logistics Support Battalion

Within the armed forces, there are a number of services. These include a Technical Service, Air Technology service, Military Police service, Communications service, Sanitary service, a Veterans service, Civilian service, Financial service, Information service, Legal service, Religious service, and a Musical service.

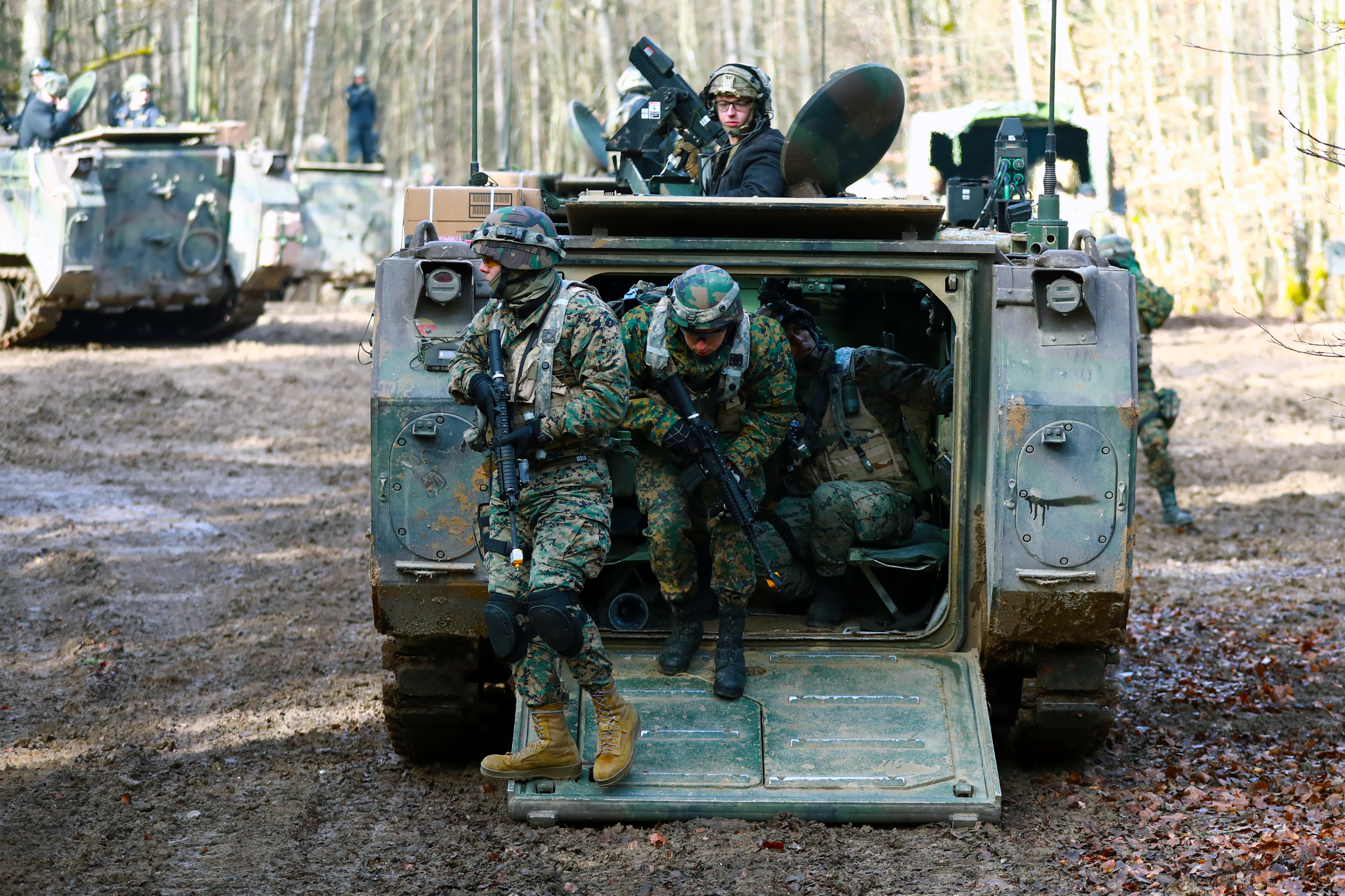
Bosnian Ground Forces during Combined Resolve XV at Hohenfels Training Area.

== Uniform and insignia ==
Armed Forces of Bosnia and Herzegovina were unified in 2005 and at that time they needed a uniform for the newly founded Armed Forces. MARPAT was designated as the future camouflage pattern to be used on combat uniforms of the AFBiH.

Insignia is found on military hats or berets, on the right and left shoulder on the uniform of all soldiers of the Armed Forces. All, except for generals, wear badges on their hats or berets with either the land force badge or air force badge. Generals wear badges with the coat of arms of Bosnia surrounded with branches and two swords. All soldiers of the armed forces have on their right shoulder a flag of Bosnia and Herzegovina. All members of the three regiments wear their regiment insignia on the left shoulder. There are other insignias, brigades or other institution are worn under the regiment insignia. The name of the soldiers is worn on the left part of the chest while the name "Armed Forces of BiH" is worn on the right part of the chest.

The new field uniform of the Armed Forces of Bosnia and Herzegovina.

In 2023, members of the Armed Forces of Bosnia and Herzegovina began to wear a new field uniform of high-quality cloth and original camouflage schemes with the characteristics of the Bosnian environment.

== Equipment ==
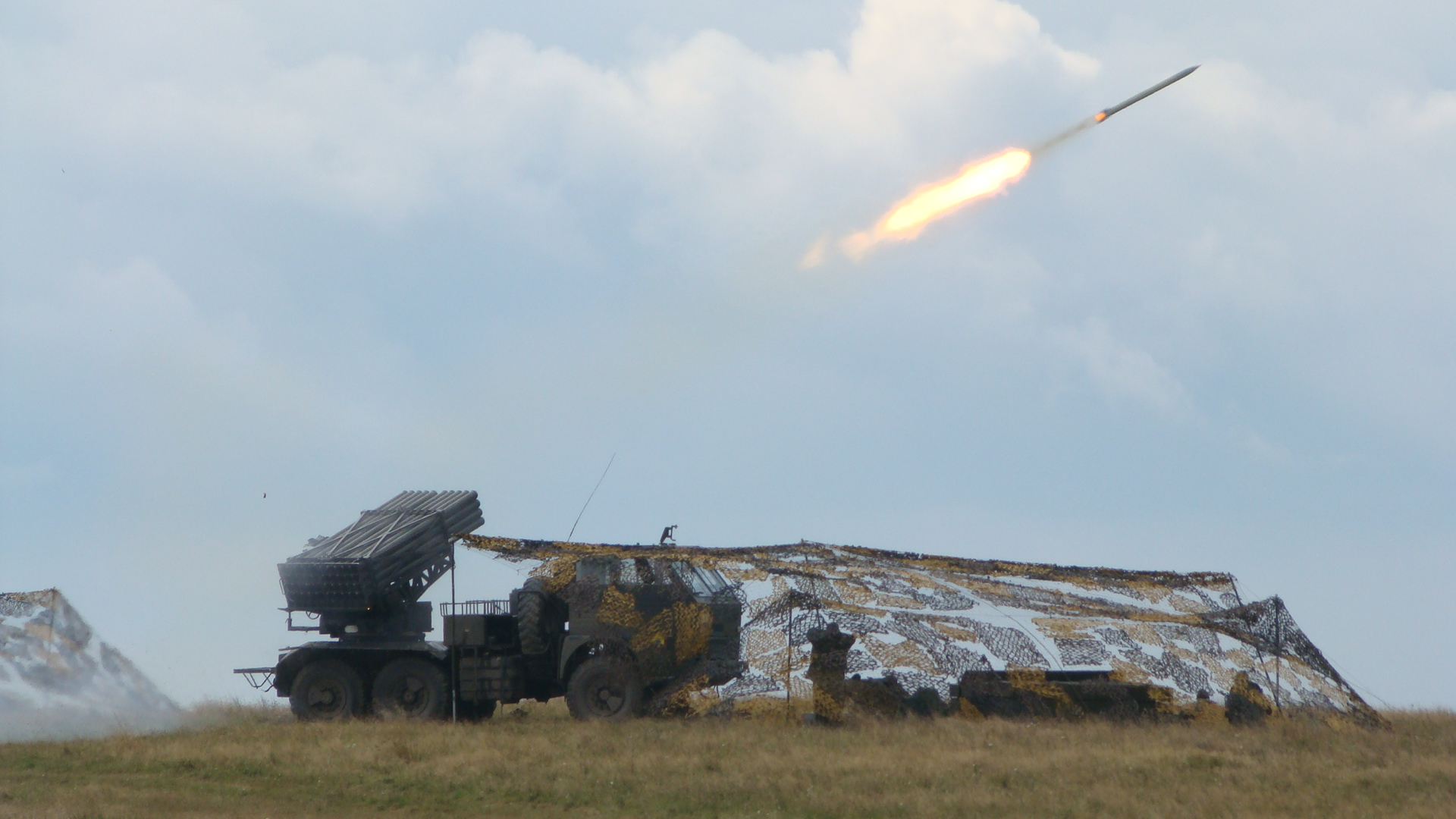
the Armed Forces of Bosnia and Herzegovina has 36 Romanian APR-40 40-round launchers.
