= Milan Gvero =

Bosnian Serb general (1937–2013)

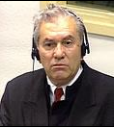
- Gvero on trial
- Born: 4 December 1937; Mrkonjić Grad, Kingdom of Yugoslavia
- Died: 17 February 2013 (aged 75); Belgrade, Serbia
- Burial place: New Bežanija Cemetery, Belgrade
- Military career
- Allegiance: SFR Yugoslavia; Republika Srpska
- Branch: Yugoslav People's Army; Army of Republika Srpska
- Rank: Lieutenant colonel general
- Conflicts: Bosnian War

Milan Gvero (Serbian Cyrillic: Милан Гверо; 4 December 1937 – 17 February 2013) was a Bosnian Serb Army (VRS/Army of Republika Srpska) general sentenced to five years in jail by the International Criminal Tribunal for the former Yugoslavia (ICTY) on charges of war crimes and crimes against humanity committed during the Bosnian War of 1992–95.

In response to President Radovan Karadžić's attempt to remove Ratko Mladić as commander of the VRS in early August 1995, General Gvero detained Karadžić for a day in the last week of August, and berated him for his hostility to Mladić and the army high command.

He was replaced on 23 October 1996 on the orders of President of Republika Srpska Biljana Plavšić. In 2005, he voluntarily surrendered to the Hague Tribunal, which sentenced him to 5 years in prison for persecution and crimes against humanity, but found him non-guilty of murders and deportation. He was released on 29 June.

On 17 February 2013, Gvero died at the Military Medical Academy in Belgrade, aged 75 as a result of a leg amputation.
