= Sifet Podžić =

Bosnian politician (born 1959)

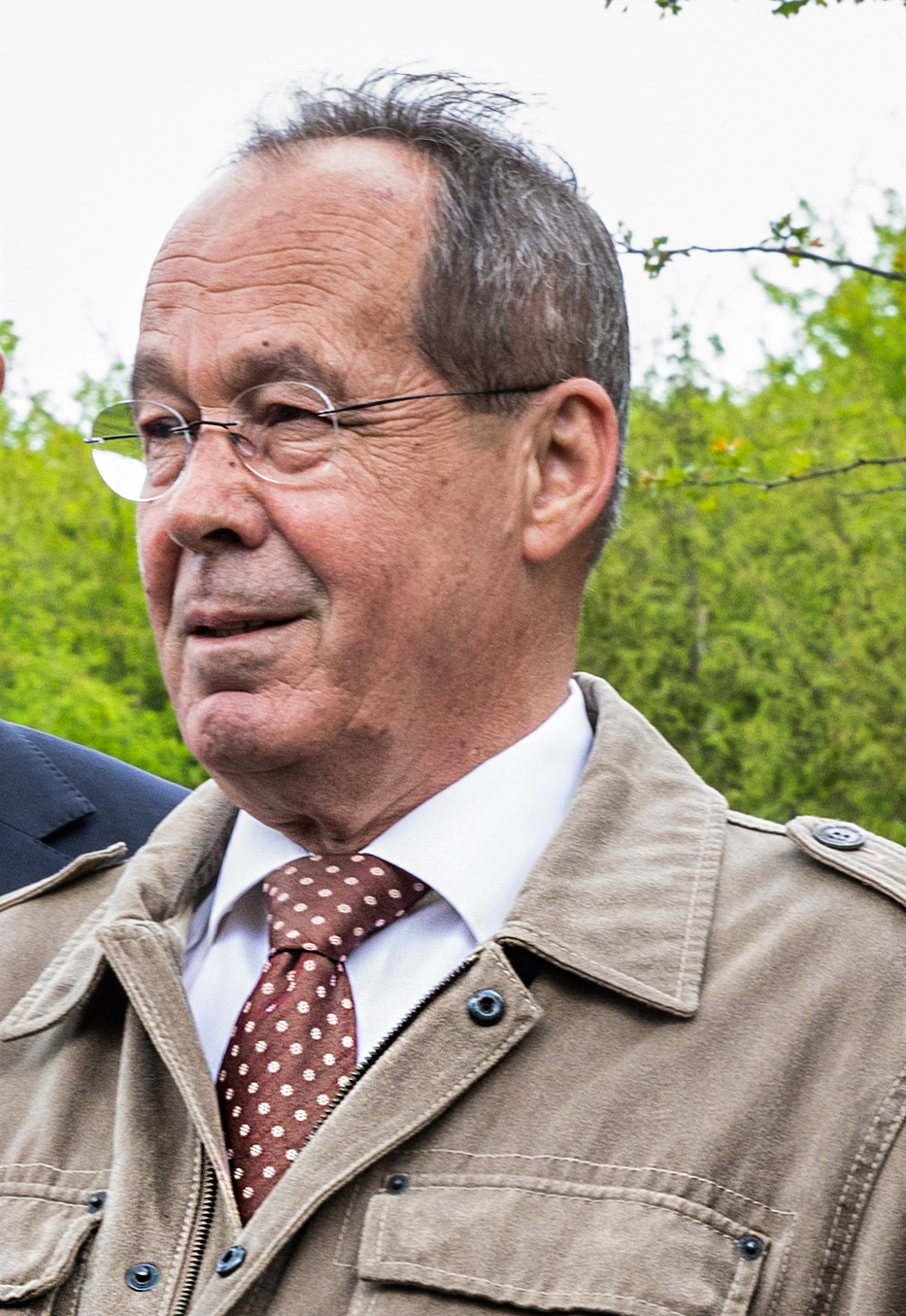
- Podžić in 2021

Minister of Defence
- In office 23 December 2019 – 25 January 2023
- Prime Minister: Zoran Tegeltija
- Preceded by: Marina Pendeš
- Succeeded by: Zukan Helez
Parliamentary offices
Member of the House of Peoples
In office
16 February 2015 – 28 February 2019
Additional positions
Chief of Joint Staff of the Armed Forces of Bosnia and Herzegovina
In office 1 January 2006 – 20 July 2008
President	Haris Silajdžić; Nebojša Radmanović; Željko Komšić
Preceded by	Office established
Succeeded by	Miladin Milojčić

Personal details
- Born: 1 May 1959 (age 67) Žepa, SR Bosnia and Herzegovina, SFR Yugoslavia
- Party: Democratic Front
- Children: 2
- Education: University of Sarajevo (MA, PhD)

Military service
- Branch/service: JNA (1978–1992); ARBiH (1992–1995); VFBiH (1995–2004); OSBiH (2004–2009)
- Years of service: 1978–2009
- Rank: Lieutenant general
- Commands: 1st Corps of the Federal Army
- Battles/wars: Bosnian War

Sifet Podžić (born 1 May 1959) is a Bosnian politician and former Army general who served as Minister of Defence from 2019 to 2023. He has been a member of the Democratic Front since 2013.

Podžić previously served as member of the national House of Peoples from 2015 to 2019, and was also the first Chief of Joint Staff of the Armed Forces of Bosnia and Herzegovina from 2006 to 2008. He has served as the Bosnia and Herzegovina ambassador to Bulgaria as well.

== Early life and education ==
Podžić was born in Žepa, SFR Yugoslavia, present-day Bosnia and Herzegovina, on 1 May 1959. He earned an MS in diplomacy and a PhD from the Faculty of Political Sciences at the University of Sarajevo.

== Minister of Defence (2019–2023) ==
=== Appointment ===
On 23 December 2019, Podžić was appointed by the Democratic Front as Minister of Defence in the government of Zoran Tegeltija.

=== Tenure ===
On 14 July 2021, Podžić and the Bosnian Foreign Minister Bisera Turković met with NATO Secretary General Jens Stoltenberg in Brussels.

In August 2021, Bosnian Presidency members Željko Komšić and Šefik Džaferović, without including third member Milorad Dodik, instructed the Ministry of Security to be available for putting out the wildfires in Herzegovina which had formed a few days before. This came after Dodik refused to give consent to the Bosnian Armed Forces to use its military helicopters to help put out the fires, because the consent of all three members of the Presidency is required for the military force's helicopters to be used. On 19 August, Dodik justified withholding consent, saying the "Helicopters are 40–50 years old. The people flying them have courage. Of course, that is not the only reason why I did not participate in the Presidency sessions. That reason is well known and it will remain so." However, on 23 August, Podžić reacted to Dodik's statement, saying "The helicopters are perfectly fine, the only reason they didn't help in putting out the fires is Dodik."

In October 2021, Podžić canceled a military exercise between the Serbian Army and the Armed Forces of Bosnia and Herzegovina due to the "bad COVID-19 epidemiological situation in the country and because of the small number of vaccinated members of the Armed Forces." This was met with outrage by Chairman of the Council of Ministers Zoran Tegeltija, who sent a request for the removal of Podžić as minister to the national Parliament. Some days later, he submitted the decision on the dismissal of Podžić to the House of Representatives. On 26 October, the majority of the House of Representatives members voted against Tegeltija's decision and did not support Podžić's dismissal.

Podžić was succeeded as Minister of Defence by Zukan Helez on 25 January 2023, following the formation of a new government presided over by Borjana Krišto.

== Personal life ==
Podžić is married and has two children. Besides his native Bosnian, he speaks English and Slovene fluently.

=== Health ===
On 17 October 2022, Podžić was rushed to hospital and had emergency surgery to remove a blood clot in his abdominal aorta. He was placed into the intensive care unit the next day. Podžić recovered and was discharged from hospital on 21 October.

Political offices
Preceded by Marina Pendeš	Minister of Defence; 2019–2023	Succeeded by Zukan Helez
