= Adnan Šteta =

Bosnian politician (born 1989)

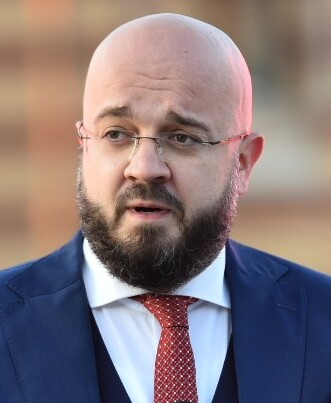
- Šteta in 2021

Minister of Transport of Sarajevo Canton
- Incumbent
- Assumed office 5 January 2021
- Prime Minister: Edin Forto; Nihad Uk
- Preceded by: Adi Kalem
- In office 26 December 2018 – 3 March 2020
- Prime Minister: Edin Forto
- Preceded by: Mujo Fišo
- Succeeded by: Adi Kalem

Personal details
- Born: 25 September 1980 (age 46) Mostar, SR Bosnia and Herzegovina, SFR Yugoslavia
- Party: Social Democratic Party (since 2018)
- Spouse: Anida Šteta (m. 2019)
- Children: 2
- Education: PIM University (MEc)

Adnan Šteta (born 25 September 1980) is a Bosnian politician serving as Minister of Transport of Sarajevo Canton since January 2021, having previously served from 2018 to 2020. He is the current deputy president of the Social Democratic Party (SDP BiH).

Born in Mostar, Šteta earned his master's degree in economics from PIM University in Banja Luka. He then worked in economics, serving in executive positions for some regional corporations, before entering politics. He unsuccessfully ran for a seat in the Federal House of Representatives in the 2018 general election as a member of the SDP BiH, before being appointed as minister. He was elected to the Sarajevo Canton Assembly in the 2022 general election, but declined to take the seat in order to continue serving as minister.

A member of the SDP BiH since 2018, Šteta has served as its head in Sarajevo Canton since 2021, additionally becoming deputy president in 2025.

== Early life and career ==
Šteta was born in Mostar, SFR Yugoslavia, present-day Bosnia and Herzegovina on 25 September 1980. He has a master's degree in economics from Banja Luka's private PIM University. He started working as an economist in Italy, before becoming a consultant with McKinsey & Company and director of Velpro in Sarajevo.

Šteta was also the executive director of Konzum in Bosnia and Herzegovina, one of the largest supermarket chains in the former Yugoslavia.

== Political career ==
Šteta entered politics by joining the Social Democratic Party (SDP BiH) in 2018. He ran for a seat in the Federal House of Representatives in the 2018 general election, but failed to get elected.

Following the election, Šteta was appointed Minister of Transport of Sarajevo Canton in December 2018 after the formation of a new cantonal government headed by Edin Forto. Šteta served as minister until March 2020, when Forto's government was ousted by the Party of Democratic Action (SDA), the Democratic Front and the Union for a Better Future. After the 2020 municipal elections and a loss in confidence in the SDA-led government, Šteta was once again appointed as transport minister in Forto's new cabinet, taking office on 5 January 2021.

In the 2022 general election, Šteta was elected to the Sarajevo Canton Assembly, winning nearly a third of the party's total votes in the canton. However, he opted not to take a seat in the Assembly, instead continuing to serve as minister.

Regarded as one of the most popular politicians in Sarajevo Canton and the wider area, Šteta subsequently quickly rose through SDP BiH ranks, becoming head of the party's Sarajevo Canton branch in July 2021. He then became deputy president of the SDP BiH in August 2025, alongside Zukan Helez and Vojin Mijatović.

== Personal life ==
Šteta married his wife Anida in 2019, and the couple has two daughters. He speaks English and Italian. Šteta is close friends with renowned Bosnian footballer Edin Džeko.
