= Zukan Helez =

Bosnian politician (born 1964)

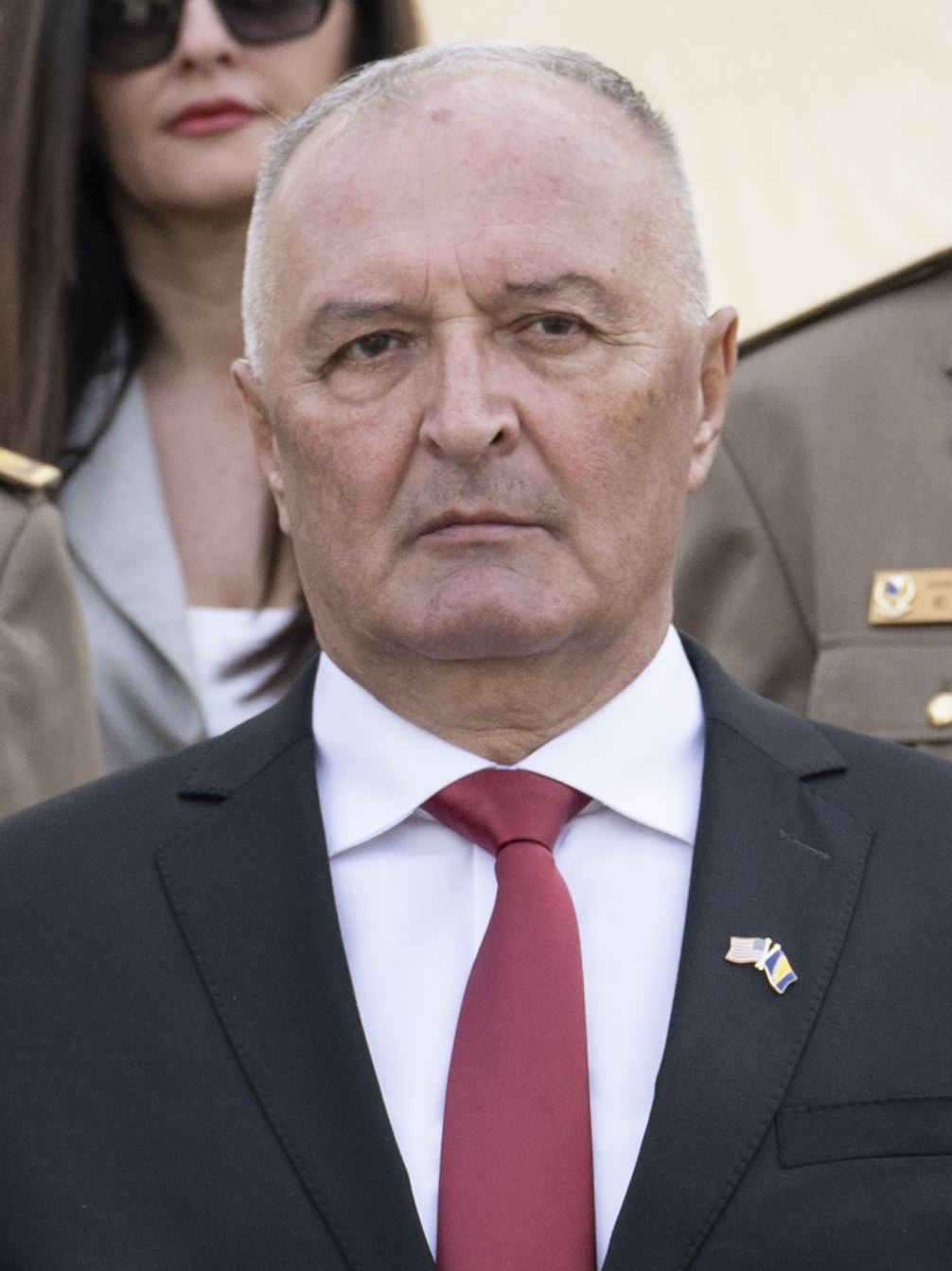
- Helez in 2025

Minister of Defence
- Incumbent
- Assumed office 25 January 2023
- Prime Minister: Borjana Krišto
- Preceded by: Sifet Podžić

Federal Minister for Veterans and Disabled Veterans
- In office 17 March 2011 – 31 March 2015
- Prime Minister: Nermin Nikšić
- Preceded by: Zahid Crnkić
- Succeeded by: Salko Bukvarević
Parliamentary offices
Member of the House of Representatives
In office 6 December 2018 – 25 January 2023
Constituency	4th Electoral Unit FBiH
Member of the Federal House of Representatives
In office 2 December 2014 – 27 November 2018
In office 27 February 2001 – 17 March 2011

Personal details
- Born: 1 January 1964 (age 62) Kupres, SR Bosnia and Herzegovina, SFR Yugoslavia
- Party: Social Democratic Party
- Children: 3
- Education: University of Sarajevo (BS)

Military service
- Allegiance: Republic of Bosnia and Herzegovina
- Branch/service: ARBiH
- Years of service: 1991–1993
- Battles/wars: Bosnian War

Zukan Helez (born 1 January 1964) is a Bosnian politician serving as Minister of Defence since 2023. He is also the current vice-chairman of the Council of Ministers of Bosnia and Herzegovina, serving alongside Staša Košarac. Helez was previously a member of the national House of Representatives from 2018 to 2023. He is the current deputy president of the Social Democratic Party as well.

Born in Kupres in 1964, Helez graduated from the University of Sarajevo in 1988. He was part of the Army of the Republic of Bosnia and Herzegovina during the Bosnian War. Following the war, he worked as a school teacher. As a member of the Social Democratic Party, he was elected to the Federal House of Representatives in the 2000 parliamentary election, and was then re-elected on multiple occasions. Following the 2010 general election, he was appointed Federal Minister for Veterans and Disabled Veterans in 2011, serving until 2015.

Helez was elected to the national House of Representatives in the 2018 general election, and managed to get re-elected in 2022. He became Minister of Defence in January 2023, after the formation of a new coalition.

== Early life and education ==
Helez was born on 1 January 1964 in Kupres where he finished elementary school. He attended high school in Bugojno between 1979 and 1983, after which he attended the Faculty of Science and Mathematics in Sarajevo, where he graduated in 1988. After his studies, Helez got a job as a professor in Skender Vakuf. In May 1992, at the beginning of the Bosnian War, he became a member of the Army of the Republic of Bosnia and Herzegovina.

After he was demobilized at the end of the war, Helez started working as a teacher in secondary schools in Donji Vakuf and Bugojno. In Italy, Germany and France, he participated in international seminars in the secondary education reform project in Bosnia and Herzegovina.

== Political career ==
A member of the Social Democratic Party (SDP BiH), Helez was elected vice president of the SDP BiH Cantonal Committee of the Central Bosnia Canton in 2003, and president in 2005. In the 2000 parliamentary election, he was elected to the Federal House of Representatives. He was re-elected in the 2002, 2006 and the 2010 general elections.

Helez served his fourth term in the Federal Parliament until 17 March 2011, when he was appointed Federal Minister for Veterans and Disabled Veterans in the government of Nermin Nikšić. He served as Federal minister until 31 March 2015. In the Federal House of Representatives, he was a member of several working bodies, boards and commissions as vice president and president.

In the 2018 general election, Helez was elected to the national House of Representatives. He was re-elected to the national House of Representatives in the 2022 general election. On 25 January 2023, following the formation of a new Council of Ministers presided over by Borjana Krišto, Helez was appointed as the new Minister of Defence and also as vice-chairman of the Council of Ministers within Krišto's government.

On 23 November 2023, Helez claimed that paramilitary camps backed by Russia were detected in Republika Srpska, one of the two entities of Bosnia and Herzegovina. His statement angered top level Bosnian Serb politicians, who said Helez "has no proof" and that he "is spreading lies that aim to cause unrest and fear." On 25 November, the Intelligence-Security Agency informed the Council of Ministers that it had no information about the existence of any military camps or paramilitary formations in the country. Following his claims, Helez gave a witness statement to the Prosecutor's Office of Bosnia and Herzegovina.

On 27 August 2025, Helez became deputy president of the SDP BiH, alongside Adnan Šteta and Vojin Mijatović.

== Controversies ==
On 15 October 2014, Helez was sentenced by the Municipal Court in Bugojno to a suspended sentence of eight months in prison for a fight which broke out in a local café in September 2013. In June 2021, he was found guilty by the Bugojno first-instance court and received a six-month sentence for giving a false testimony for an incident that happened some years before. This was overturned in June 2022, with Helez being given a nine-month suspended sentence.

In September 2025, a video emerged of Helez standing on a table in a banquet hall and singing a song by the controversial, far-right Croatian nationalist singer Marko Perković Thompson. Helez declined to issue an apology after the video was released, describing the song as a patriotic tune. Later that month, it was reported by N1 that the Ministry of Defence had spent 997,176 KM in public funds on catering between 2021 and 2024, some of it during Helez's term, and 20% of which was spent on alcoholic beverages. An investigation by the news agency found that Helez regularly misreported the nature of the events at which public funds were being spent, as well as the number of people in attendance.

In December 2025, Helez linked Croatian MEP Željana Zovko and Max Primorac, a senior official of the Heritage Foundation, to Ustasha genes via Facebook. He then appeared on television, where he called them "Ustasha bastards", adding that Zovko was "semi-retarded." His statements came after Primorac was heard before the US Congress Committee on Europe. There, he said that Bosnian Croat Catholics were discriminated against by Bosnian Muslims, and proposed the establishment of a Croatian entity in Bosnia and Herzegovina, in contrast to the Dayton Agreement.

== Personal life ==
Helez is married and has three children. Besides his native Bosnian, he speaks English and Russian fluently.

Political offices
Preceded by Sifet Podžić	Minister of Defence; 2023–present	Incumbent
