= General Staff of the Army of Republika Srpska =

Highest staff organization in the Army of Republika Srpska

- Генералштаб Војске Републике Српске; Generalštab Vojske Republike Srpske
- Active: 1992–2005
- Country: Republika Srpska
- Allegiance: Army of Republika Srpska
- Branch: Active duty
- Type: Staff
- Part of: Ministry of Defence
- Garrison/HQ: Banja Luka

Commanders
- First Chief: Colonel general Ratko Mladić
- Last Chief: Major general Novak Đukić

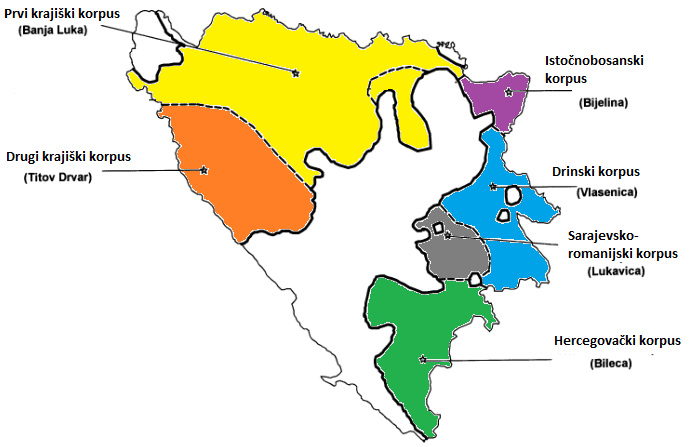
Territorial organization of VRS

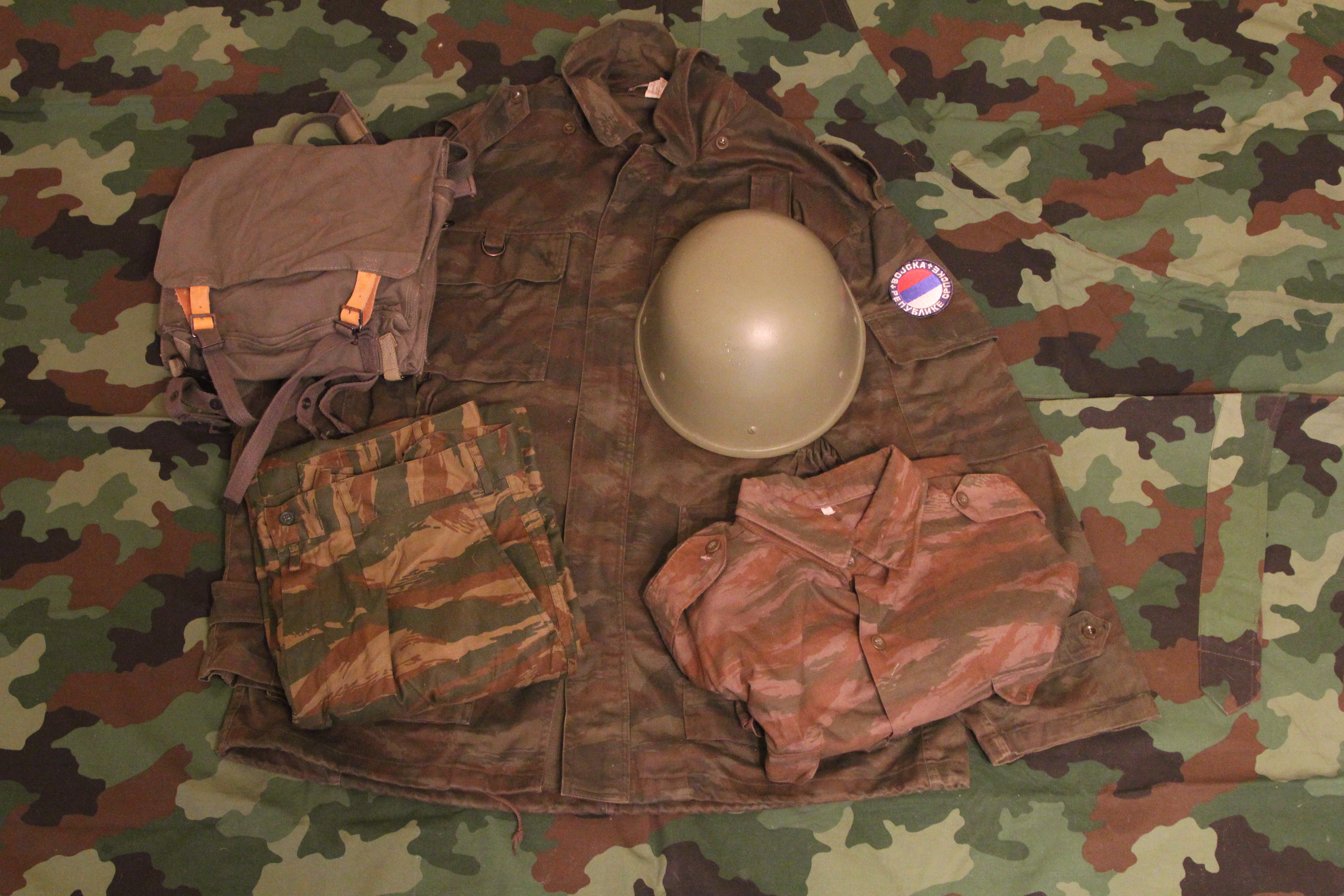
Uniform of VRS

The General Staff of the Army of Republika Srpska (Serbian: Генералштаб Војске Републике Српске / Generalštab Vojske Republike Srpske) was the highest professional and staff organ for preparation and use of the Army of Republika Srpska in war and in peace.

== Main Staff (1992–1995) ==
After the outbreak of the Bosnian War, the Army of Republika Srpska was founded on 12 May 1992 with Ratko Mladić as its commander. Since the command and units of the Yugoslav People's Army withdrew from Bosnia and Herzegovina on 20 May; that brigades of the Territorial Defence of Republika Srpska with few or none professional military cadres were just formed; that Bosnian War was already in full motion; and that war zone was flooded with volunteer units out of control, the creation of an unified military command unfolded in exceptionally difficult circumstances.

The core of new General Staff was formed by Bosnian Serb officers of the 9th Knin Corps and the 2nd Army District of the Yugoslav People's Army. The General Staff was composed of the Command and staff units.

=== Command ===
The head of the Main Staff and the Command was General Ratko Mladić. The Command was divided in five independent sectors, staff and administration:

- Staff for operational-educative affairs – Major general Manojlo Milovanović (simultaneously deputy commander of the Main Staff)
- Sector for mobilization and administrative-personal affairs – Colonel Mićo Grubor
- Sector for morale, religious and legal affairs – Major general Milan Gvero
- Sector for intelligence and security affairs – Colonel Zdravko Tolimir
- Sector for the Air Force and Air Defence – Colonel Jovo Marić
- Administration for development and finance – Colonel Stevan Tomić
- Sector for rear services – Major general Đorđe Đukić

Closest advisors of commander of the Main Staff and people charged with the most responsible tasks were: Đorđe Đukić (logistics, spare parts, etc.), Manojlo Milovanović (planning, creating operational plans, leading operations on the field, etc.), Zdravko Tolimir (intelligence affairs) and Milan Gvero (political affairs of the Main Staff, especially relations with civilian authorities of the Republika Srpska and international observers).

=== Staff units ===
- Training Center "Rajko Balać"
- Center for informational-propaganda activity
- 65th Protection Motorized Regiment
- 67th Communications Regiment
- 40th Engineering Regiment
- 1st Guards Motorized Brigade of the Main Staff
- 89th Rocket-Artillery Brigade
- 1st Serb Mixed Brigade (temporary composition)
- 2nd Serb Mixed Brigade (temporary composition)
- 3rd Serb Mixed Brigade (temporary composition)
- 14th Serb Brigade (temporary composition)
- 10th Diversant Unit
- 10th Intelligence Center
- 14th Rear Base
- 27th Rear Base
- 30th Rear Base
- 35th Rear Base
- 63rd Automobile Battalion
- Military Hospital of the Main Staff
- Military Medical Center of the Army
- Aviation Institute "Eagle"
- Repair Institute "Cosmos"
- Rear Company of Vrbas barracks

=== Main Staff in war ===
The principal task of the Main Staff was planning the strategy for the conduct of the war, and cooperation with civilian authorities in order to secure the necessary resources. Very often, the Main Staff would conduct military operations via front command posts. In the first year of the war, almost whole attention of the Main Staff was directed towards the formation of military brigades out of the Territorial Defence units and volunteers. The Command of the Main Staff often came into clashed with civilian authorities, partly because of different perception of political repercussions of military operations on world public opinion (political leadership of Republika Srpska was, naturally, more sensitive on international pressures), and partly because of interweaving of responsibilities, especially about material and financial supply of the Army. According to opinion of some experts who studied the course of the Bosnian War, the Command of the Main Staff of the Army of Republika Srpska proved to be the most capable military leadership among the participants in the war:

The Main Staff, although composed of various officers arriving from different commands, developed during the war into the most professional staff and planning body among the warring parties in the Bosnian War.

== List of chiefs ==
No.	Portrait	Chief of the General Staff	Took office	Left office	Time in office	Defence branch
1	Ratko Mladić	Colonel general Ratko Mladić (1942–2026)	12 May 1992	8 November 1996	4 years, 180 days	Army
2	Pero Čolić [sr]	Major general Pero Čolić (1937–2006)	1996	1998	1–2 years	Army
3	Momir Talić	Colonel general Momir Talić (1942–2003)	6 March 1998	1999	0–1 years	Army
4	Novica Simić	Colonel general Novica Simić (1948–2012)	1999	2002	2–3 years	Army
5	Cvjetko Savić [sr]	Lt. Col. General; Cvjetko Savić (1951–2016)	26 March 2003	16 April 2004	1 year, 21 days	Army
6	Novak Đukić [sr]	Major general Novak Đukić (born 1955)	2004	3 June 2005	0–1 years	Army

== See also ==
- Army of Republika Srpska
- Ministry of Defence (Republika Srpska)

== Bibliography ==
- Balkan Battlegrounds: A Military History of the Yugoslav Conflict, 1990–1995 Volume I and II. Central Intelligence Agency, Office of Russian and European Analysis.
- Bulatović, Ljiljana: Raport Komandantu. Beograd : Udruženje pisaca Poeta : Lj. Bulatović, 2010
