= Vojin Mijatović =

Bosnian politician (born 1979)

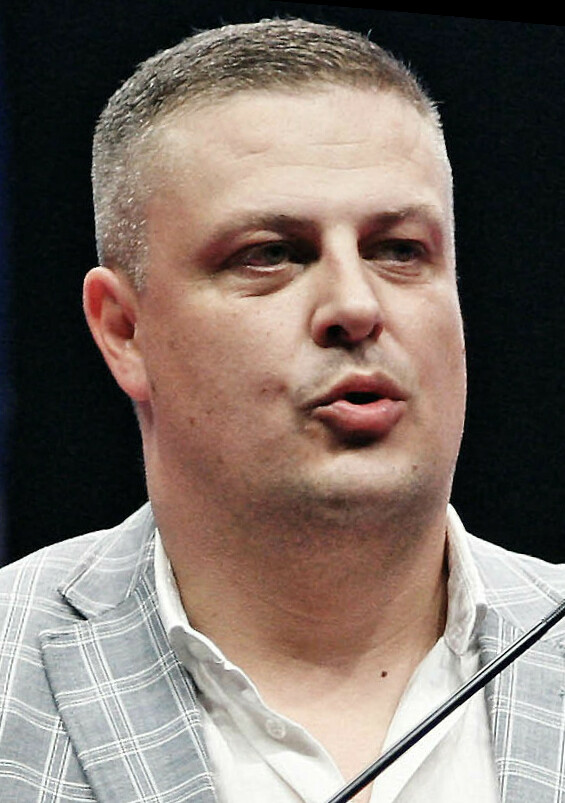
- Mijatović in 2018

Federal Minister of Development, Entrepreneurship and Craft
- In office 28 April 2023 – 20 October 2026
- Prime Minister: Nermin Nikšić
- Preceded by: Amir Zukić

Personal details
- Born: 11 August 1979 (age 47) Banja Luka, SR Bosnia and Herzegovina, SFR Yugoslavia
- Party: Social Democratic Party (2016–present)
- Other political affiliations: Alliance of Independent Social Democrats (2006–2016)
- Children: 1
- Education: Megatrend University (BBA)

Vojin Mijatović (Serbian Cyrillic: Војин Мијатовић; born 11 August 1979) is a Bosnian politician, who served as the Federal Minister of Development, Entrepreneurship and Craft from 2023 to 2026. He is also the current deputy president of the Social Democratic Party (SDP BiH).

Mijatović was a member of the Alliance of Independent Social Democrats, until he left it in 2016 to join the SDP BiH, due to major ideological differences and disagreements with the former's policies.

== Early life and education ==
Mijatović was born to Bosnian Serb parents on 11 August 1979 in Banja Luka, SFR Yugoslavia. In 2002, he graduated at the Faculty of Business Studies in Belgrade at Megatrend University.

== Political career ==
Mijatović started his career in 2001 at the Ministry for Refugees and Displaced Persons, where he worked as a spokesperson until 2006.

Mijatović joined Milorad Dodik's Alliance of Independent Social Democrats (SNSD) in 2006. The same year he was named the head of the Department for European Integration of the Ministry of Finance of Republika Srpska. In 2008, he became an adviser to the Chairman of the Council of Ministers of Bosnia and Herzegovina. In 2009, he was appointed Assistant Minister of Finance of Republika Srpska for EU pre-accession assistance, and from 2010 to 2013, he worked as an advisor to the President of Republika Srpska for international relations and cooperation with international financial institutions.

From 2014 to 2016, Mijatović was the director of the Economic Institute in Banja Luka.

Initially considered as a moderate and reformist alternative to the ultranationalist Serb Democratic Party, in 2016, Mijatović changed political positions and left the SNSD after an increasingly-nationalist and separatist line. Following his departure from the SNSD, Mijatović joined the Social Democratic Party (SDP BiH). In July 2019, he was appointed vice-president of the SDP BiH. In August 2025, he became the party's deputy president, alongside Adnan Šteta and Zukan Helez.

On 10 June 2022, Mijatović announced his candidacy in the Bosnian general election, running for Bosnia and Herzegovina's three-person Presidency member, representing the Serbs. At the general election however, held on 2 October 2022, he was not elected, obtaining only 6.09% of the vote.

On 28 April 2023, following the formation of a new Federal Government presided over by Nermin Nikšić, Mijatović was appointed as the new Federal Minister of Development, Entrepreneurship and Craft within Nikšić's government.

== Personal life ==
Mijatović is married and has one child. On 26 May 2024, his brother Đorđe was beaten to death on a local children's playground while defending his child from an attack by a group of hooligans in Belgrade.

Political offices
Preceded by Amir Zukić	Federal Minister of Development, Entrepreneurship and Craft; 2023–present	Incumbent
