= Ministry of Defence (Republika Srpska) =

Former entity-level defence ministry in Bosnia and Herzegovina (1992–2005)

Ministry of Defence of Republika Srpska
- Министарство одбране Републике Српске; Ministarstvo odbrane Republike Srpske
- Standard of the Minister of Defence (1995–2007)

Agency overview
- Formed: 22 April 1992; 34 years ago
- Dissolved: 28 December 2005; 20 years ago
- Jurisdiction: Republika Srpska
- Headquarters: Banja Luka
- Ministers responsible: Bogdan Subotić, first Minister of Defence; Milovan Stanković, last Minister of Defence

The Ministry of Defence of Republika Srpska (Serbian: Министарство одбране Републике Српске) was the entity-level department responsible for defence policy, mobilisation, and administrative support to the armed forces of Republika Srpska between 1992 and 2005. It was established by the entity authorities in April 1992. It functioned throughout the wartime period (1992-95) in conjunction with the Army of Republika Srpska (VRS), and was abolished during state-level defence reforms culminating in the formation of the unified Armed Forces of Bosnia and Herzegovina in 2005-06.

== History ==
=== Establishment (1991–1992) ===
In the autumn of 1991, following the multi-party elections and escalating nationalist tensions in the Socialist Republic of Bosnia and Herzegovina, Serbian political leaders and the Yugoslav People's Army (JNA) began organising parallel structures in Serb-majority areas. Several self-proclaimed "Serb Autonomous Oblasts" (SAOs) emerged, intended to form the basis of a contiguous Serb territory within Bosnia and Herzegovina. As noted in the analysis of the International Criminal Tribunal for the former Yugoslavia (ICTY), these moves included clandestine arms distributions and paramilitary re-organisation.

Amid these preparations, on 22 April 1992 the Government of the newly declared entity of Republika Srpska formally established the Ministry of Defence, with Bogdan Subotić appointed as first Minister. Shortly after, on 12 May 1992 the entity’s Assembly approved the formal creation of the Army of Republika Srpska (VRS). These institutional steps solidified the parallel Serb defence structure, and the Ministry issued mobilisation orders and assumed responsibility for personnel, logistics and coordination of the defence system.

=== Wartime role (1992–1995) ===
During the Bosnian War the Ministry of Defence functioned as the civilian administrative body overseeing defence affairs of the entity, while operational command of combat units lay with the VRS Main Staff and the entity Presidency as Commander-in Chief. The Ministry’s tasks included mobilisation, administration of manpower records, procurement and supply, integration of paramilitary formations into the VRS structure, and coordination with civilian ministries and government institutions for the war effort. Tribunal documentation confirms the Ministry’s role in mobilising and supporting the VRS chain of command.

=== Post-Dayton period and abolition (1995–2005) ===
In the post-war era the Ministry continued as the defence authority for the entity within the Bosnia and Herzegovina state framework. Under the supervision of the Office of the High Representative (OHR), defence reform began in 2003. The 2005 Law on Defence of Bosnia and Herzegovina mandated the abolition of entity armies and ministries; on 28 December 2005 the Ministry of Defence of Republika Srpska was dissolved and its functions transferred to the state-level Ministry of Defence and the unified Armed Forces of Bosnia and Herzegovina.

== Structure and functions ==
Entity legislation defined the Ministry as responsible for "regulating, developing and implementing the defence system," including tasks of mobilisation, education, logistics and defence-sector organisation. In wartime the operational command of units was handled by the VRS Main Staff; the Ministry functioned largely as the civilian/administrative backbone of the entity’s military structure.

== List of ministers ==
No.	Portrait	Minister	Took office	Left office	Time in office	Party	Defence branch	Ref.
1	Bogdan Subotić [sr]	Colonel; Bogdan Subotić (1941–2022)	22 April 1992	20 January 1993	273 days	Independent	Army	
2	Dušan Kovačević [sr]	Colonel (when appointed); Major general (since 10 November 1993); Dušan Kovačević (born 1942)	20 January 1993	18 August 1994	1 year, 210 days	Independent	Army	
3	Milan Ninković [sr]	Milan Ninković (born 1943)	18 August 1994	18 January 1998	3 years, 153 days	SDS	none	
4	Manojlo Milovanović [sr]	Colonel general Manojlo Milovanović (1943–2019)	18 January 1998	12 January 2001	2 years, 360 days	Independent	Army	
5	Slobodan Bilić [sr]	Slobodan Bilić (born 1951)	12 January 2001	17 January 2003	2 years, 5 days	SP	none	
6	Milovan Stanković [sr]	Milovan Stanković (born 1958)	17 January 2003	28 December 2005	2 years, 345 days	SDS	none	

== See also ==
- Army of Republika Srpska
- General Staff of the Army of Republika Srpska
