= Munib Bisić =

Bosnian Army officer (1957-2009)

Minister of Defence
- In office 15 April 1992 – 30 January 1996
- Prime Minister: Jure Pelivan; Mile Akmadžić; Haris Silajdžić
- Preceded by: Jerko Doko
- Succeeded by: Hamdija Hadžihasanović

Personal details
- Born: 5 December 1957 Breza, FPR Yugoslavia
- Died: 30 March 2009 (aged 51) Sarajevo, Bosnia and Herzegovina
- Party: Party of Democratic Action

Military service
- Allegiance: Republic of Bosnia and Herzegovina
- Years of service: 1992–1995
- Battles/wars: Bosnian War

Munib Bisić (5 December 1957 – 30 March 2009) was a Bosnian Army officer who served as the Minister of Defence of the Republic of Bosnia and Herzegovina during the Bosnian War.

Bisić was born in Breza, FPR Yugoslavia, where he was educated, later continuing his studies at the Faculty of Political Science in Sarajevo. He worked as a teacher before the Yugoslav wars. From 2002 to 2004 he served as Deputy Chief Inspector in the Federal Ministry of Defence. He was prematurely retired in October 2004. Bisić was a reserve officer of the Territorial Defence, and promoted to the rank of Brigadier General in April 1994. He was a member of the General Staff of the Patriotic League since its inception.

Bisić died in 2009, aged 52, in Sarajevo, from undisclosed causes.
