= Kupres, Busovača =

Kupres
- Village
- Location within Bosnia and Herzegovina
- Coordinates: 44°04′39″N 17°51′51″E
- Country: Bosnia and Herzegovina
- Entity: Federation of Bosnia and Herzegovina
- Canton: Central Bosnia
- Municipality: Busovača

Area
  - Total: 14.70 sq mi (38.08 km^{2})

Population (2013)
  - Total: 230
  - Density: 16/sq mi (6.0/km^{2})
- Time zone: UTC+1 (CET)
  - Summer (DST): UTC+2 (CEST)

Kupres is a village in the municipality of Busovača, Bosnia and Herzegovina.

== Demographics ==
According to the 2013 census, its population was 230.

Ethnicity in 2013
Ethnicity	Number	Percentage
Croats	229	99.6%
Serbs	1	0.4%
Total	230	100%
