= Marina Pendeš =

Bosnian Croat politician (born 1964)

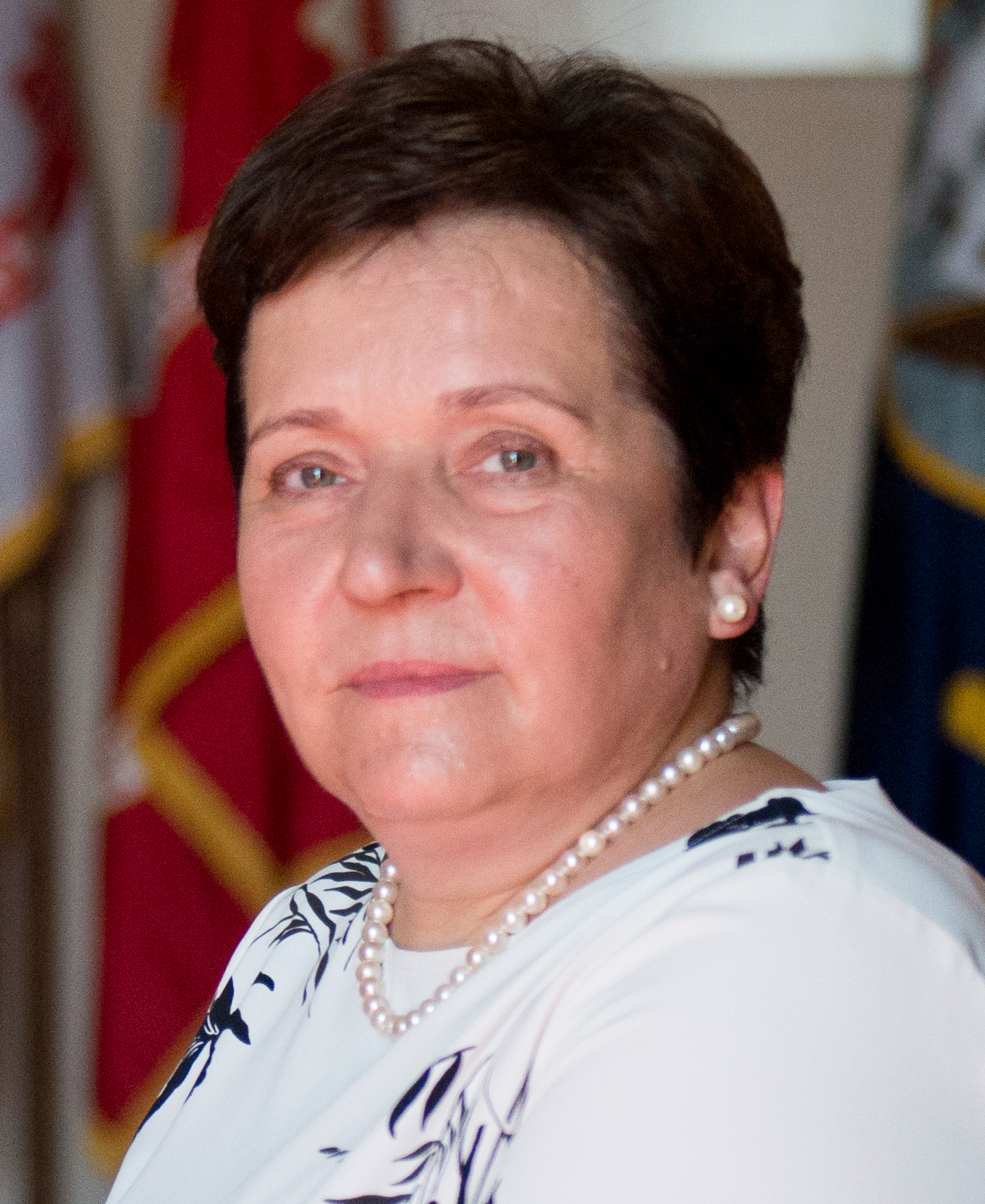
- Pendeš in 2016

Member of the House of Peoples
- Incumbent
- Assumed office 23 December 2019

Minister of Defence
- In office 31 March 2015 – 23 December 2019
- Prime Minister: Denis Zvizdić
- Preceded by: Zekerijah Osmić
- Succeeded by: Sifet Podžić

Personal details
- Born: 20 August 1964 (age 62) Travnik, SR Bosnia and Herzegovina, SFR Yugoslavia
- Party: Croatian Democratic Union (1995–present)
- Other political affiliations: League of Communists (1987–1989)
- Education: Military Technical Academy "Ivan Gošnjak", Zagreb

Marina Pendeš (born 20 August 1964) is a Bosnian Croat politician serving as member of the national House of Peoples since 2019. She previously served as Minister of Defence from 2015 to 2019, and as Deputy Minister of Defence from 2004 to 2015. She was also a member of the Central Bosnia Canton Assembly and later government from 2002 to 2004.

Pendeš is a member of the Croatian Democratic Union of Bosnia and Herzegovina, and is currently a member of the Presidency and Main Board of the party.

== Early life and education ==
Pendeš was born in Travnik on 20 August 1964. She attended elementary school in Vitez and gymnasium in Travnik. She became a member of the League of Communists of Yugoslavia in 1987. Pendeš graduated in electrical engineering from the Military Technical Academy "Ivan Gošnjak" in Zagreb in 1988, after receiving a scholarship from the Yugoslav People's Army.

== Career ==
Pendeš was an independent constructor in the military industry in Travnik from 1988 until 1992. She was a member of the Croatian Defence Council and worked in the Military Intelligence Service in Central Bosnia during the Bosnian War. After the war, she became a member of the Croatian Democratic Union (HDZ BiH) and head of the department of the "Hrvatski telekom" in Vitez until 2003.

Pendeš was elected to the City Assembly of Vitez in the 1997 municipal elections. She was then elected to the Assembly of the Central Bosnia Canton in the 2002 general election, and served as Minister of Physical Planning, Restructuring and Return of the Canton from 2003 to 2004.

Pendeš was the Deputy Minister of Defence from 2004 to 2015, before being appointed Minister of Defence in March 2015 and serving until December 2019. She was later delegated to the national House of Peoples after the 2018 general election, and was reappointed following the 2022 election.

== Charges ==
In July 2015, Pendeš was charged by the State Prosecutor's Office for paying a salary to her advisor Ivo Miro Jović while she was Deputy Minister, despite him not showing up to work. In February 2016, she was acquitted by the Court of Bosnia and Herzegovina of the charges of careless performance of official duties and forging documents.

Political offices
| Preceded by Zekerijah Osmić | Minister of Defence; 2015–2019 | Succeeded by Sifet Podžić |
