= Ministry of Defence (Bosnia and Herzegovina) =

Government ministry of Bosnia and Herzegovina

Ministry of Defence of Bosnia and Herzegovina
- Ministarstvo odbrane Bosne i Hercegovine; Ministarstvo obrane Bosne i Hercegovine; Министарство одбране Босне и Херцеговине

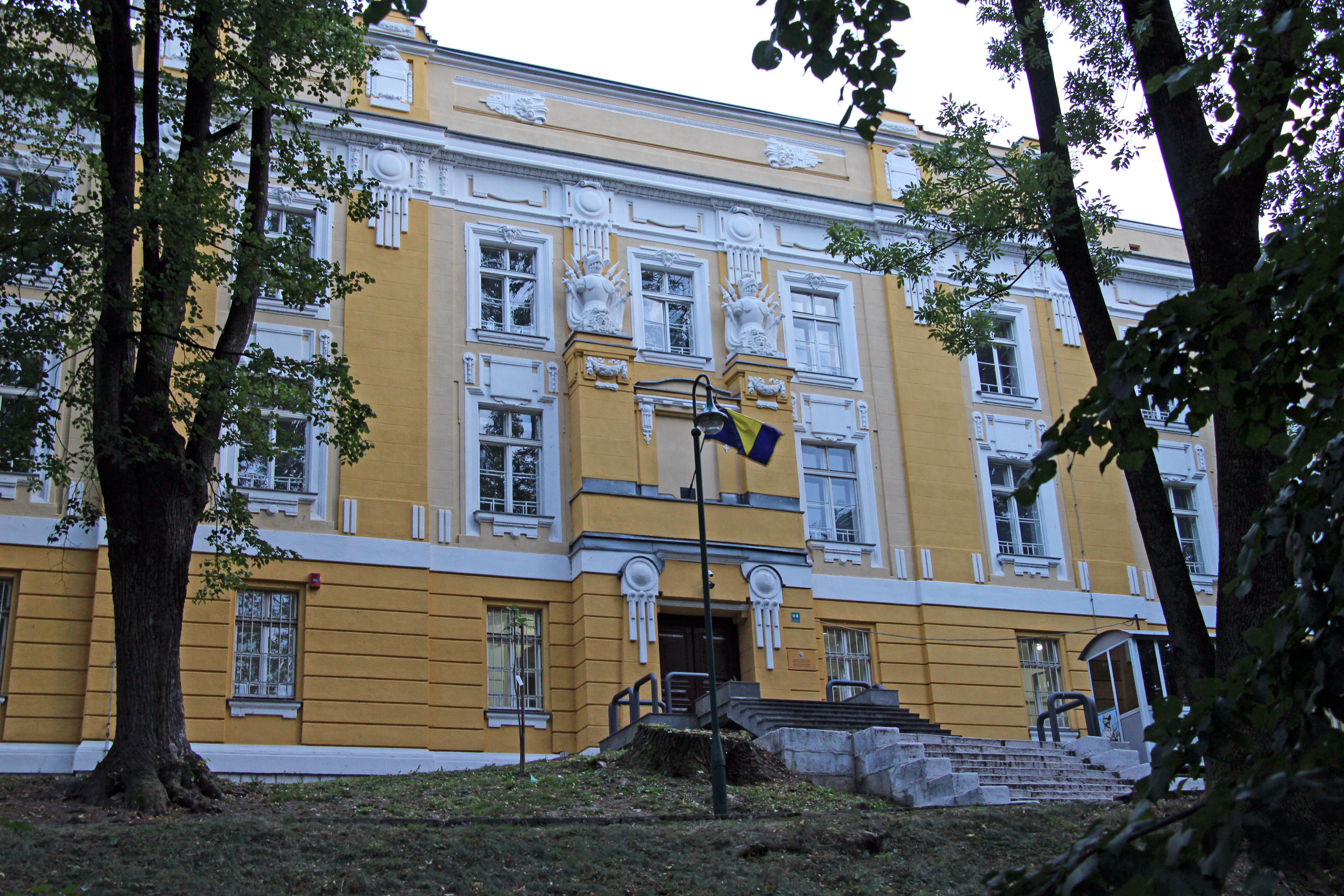
- Franz Joseph Garrison, seat of the Ministry of Defence of Bosnia and Herzegovina

Department overview
- Formed: 2004
- Headquarters: Sarajevo, Bosnia and Herzegovina
- Minister responsible: Zukan Helez
- Website: mod.gov.ba

The Ministry of Defence of Bosnia and Herzegovina (Serbo-Croatian: Ministarstvo odbrane Bosne i Hercegovine / Министарство одбране Босне и Херцеговине) is the government ministry responsible for the Armed Forces of Bosnia and Herzegovina and defence affairs in Bosnia and Herzegovina.

== History ==
Prior to the creation of the Ministry of Defence of Bosnia and Herzegovina, from 1945 to 1992, the Ministry of Defence of Yugoslavia was responsible for the defence of the Socialist Federal Republic of Yugoslavia.

Following the independence of Bosnia and Herzegovina from Yugoslavia in 1992, the Ministry of Defence of the Republic of Bosnia and Herzegovina was formed, with Munib Bisić appointed as minister. The ministry had the newly formed Army of the Republic of Bosnia and Herzegovina at its disposal. In addition to the Ministry of Defence of the Republic of Bosnia and Herzegovina, there were two other ministries of defence in Bosnia and Herzegovina: the Ministry of Defence of the Republika Srpska and the Ministry of Defence of Herzeg-Bosnia.

After the signing of the Dayton Agreement in December 1995 and the end of the Bosnian War, the Army of the Federation of Bosnia and Herzegovina was formed by merging the Croatian Defence Council with the Army of the Republic of Bosnia and Herzegovina.

On 1 December 2005, the Armed Forces of Bosnia and Herzegovina were formed by merging the Army of the Federation of Bosnia and Herzegovina and the Army of Republika Srpska under one ministry.

Since 25 January 2023, Zukan Helez (SDP BiH) has served as Minister of Defence of Bosnia and Herzegovina.

== Organization ==
The Ministry of Defence of Bosnia and Herzegovina consists of eight sectors and six offices, three of which are religious services.

- Inspectorate General
- Policy and Plans Sector
- Sector for International Cooperation
- Sector for Intelligence and Security Affairs
- Sector for Command, Control and Communications, Computers and Information Management
- Personnel Management Department
- Procurement and Logistics Sector
- Finance and Budget Sector
- Internal Audit Office
- Public Relations Office
- Department for General and Joint Affairs
- Office of the Military Mufti
- Office of Orthodox Pastoral Care
- Office of Catholic Pastoral Care

== List of ministers ==
=== Ministers of Defence of the Republic of Bosnia and Herzegovina (1992–1996) ===
Political parties:
Party of Democratic Action (SDA)

No.	Portrait	Minister of Defence	Took office	Left office	Time in office	Party
1	Munib Bisić	Munib Bisić (1957–2009)	15 April 1992	30 January 1996	3 years, 290 days	SDA

=== Ministers of Defence of Bosnia and Herzegovina (2004–present) ===
Political parties:
Serb Democratic Party (SDS)
Party of Democratic Action (SDA)
Social Democratic Party (SDP BiH)
Croatian Democratic Union of Bosnia and Herzegovina (HDZ BiH)
Democratic Front (DF)

No.	Portrait	Minister of Defence	Took office	Left office	Time in office	Party
1	Nikola Radovanović	Nikola Radovanović (born 1960)	9 March 2004	11 January 2007	2 years, 331 days	SDS
2	Selmo Cikotić	Selmo Cikotić (born 1964)	11 January 2007 (officially on 22 April 2007)	12 January 2012	5 years, 1 day	SDA
3	Muhamed Ibrahimović	Muhamed Ibrahimović (born 1960)	12 January 2012	22 November 2012	286 days	SDA
4	Zekerijah Osmić	Zekerijah Osmić (born 1956)	22 November 2012	31 March 2015	2 years, 129 days	SDP BiH
5	Marina Pendeš	Marina Pendeš (born 1964)	31 March 2015	23 December 2019	4 years, 267 days	HDZ BiH
6	Sifet Podžić	Sifet Podžić (born 1959)	23 December 2019	25 January 2023	3 years, 33 days	DF
7	Zukan Helez	Zukan Helez (born 1964)	25 January 2023	Incumbent	3 years, 195 days	SDP BiH

Source: Rulers.org
