= List of members of the House of Representatives of Bosnia and Herzegovina, 2022–2026 =

The 9th legislature of the House of Representatives of Bosnia and Herzegovina was constituted on 1 December 2022 and includes 42 members elected in the general election on 2 October 2022, representing the 8 electoral units of Bosnia and Herzegovina, five of which in the Federation and three in Republika Srpska.

== Parliamentary officials ==
=== Members of the Collegium, 2022–2026 ===
In accordance with the Constitution of Bosnia and Herzegovina, members of the Collegium rotate in the position of Speaker of the House every eight months. Members are composed of one Bosniak, one Croat and one Serb.

Ethnic group	Photo	Name	Party	Tenure
Bosniaks		Denis Zvizdić	People and Justice	1 December 2022 – 1 August 2023; 1 December 2024 – 1 August 2025
Croats		Marinko Čavara	Croatian Democratic Union	1 August 2023 – 1 April 2024; 1 August 2025 – 1 April 2026
Serbs		Nebojša Radmanović (until 2025)	Alliance of Independent Social Democrats	1 April 2024 – 1 December 2024
Serbs		Darko Babalj (from 2025)	Serb Democratic Party	1 April 2026 – present

=== MPs by parliamentary club ===
Parliamentary club	Name	Electoral Unit
Party of Democratic Action (8)	Šerif Špago	2nd FBiH
Party of Democratic Action (8)	Edin Ramić	3rd FBiH
Party of Democratic Action (8)	Midhat Čaušević	5th FBiH
Party of Democratic Action (8)	Safet Kešo	3rd FBiH
Party of Democratic Action (8)	Nermin Mandra	4th FBiH
Party of Democratic Action (8)	Amor Mašović	3rd FBiH
Party of Democratic Action (8)	Denijal Tulumović	5th FBiH
Party of Democratic Action (8)	Šemsudin Dedić	1st FBiH
Alliance of Independent Social Democrats (5)	Sanja Vulić	2nd RS
Alliance of Independent Social Democrats (5)	Miroslav Vujičić	3rd RS
Alliance of Independent Social Democrats (5)	Milorad Kojić	1st RS
Alliance of Independent Social Democrats (5)	Obren Petrović	2nd RS
Alliance of Independent Social Democrats (5)	Nebojša Radmanović	1st RS
Social Democratic Party (5)	Saša Magazinović	3rd FBiH
Social Democratic Party (5)	Rejhana Dervišević	5th FBiH
Social Democratic Party (5)	Albin Muslić	1st FBiH
Social Democratic Party (5)	Jasmin Imamović	5th FBiH
Social Democratic Party (5)	Ermina Salkičević-Dizdarević	4th FBiH
Serb Democratic Party – Party of Democratic Progress – For Justice and Order (5)	Mira Pekić	1st RS
Serb Democratic Party – Party of Democratic Progress – For Justice and Order (5)	Nenad Grković	3rd RS
Serb Democratic Party – Party of Democratic Progress – For Justice and Order (5)	Darko Babalj	3rd RS
Serb Democratic Party – Party of Democratic Progress – For Justice and Order (5)	Mladen Bosić	2nd RS
Serb Democratic Party – Party of Democratic Progress – For Justice and Order (5)	Branislav Borenović	1st RS
Croatian Democratic Union (4)	Predrag Kožul	2nd FBiH
Croatian Democratic Union (4)	Darijana Filipović	2nd FBiH
Croatian Democratic Union (4)	Marinko Čavara	4th FBiH
Croatian Democratic Union (4)	Slavko Matić	5th FBiH
Democratic Front (3)	Milan Dunović	3rd FBiH
Democratic Front (3)	Vlatko Glavaš	4th FBiH
Democratic Front (3)	Zlatan Begić	5th FBiH
People and Justice (3)	Nihad Omerović	5th FBiH
People and Justice (3)	Mia Karamehić-Abazović	3rd FBiH
People and Justice (3)	Denis Zvizdić	3rd FBiH
Our Party – Bosnian-Herzegovinian Initiative (3)	Sabina Ćudić	3rd FBiH
Our Party – Bosnian-Herzegovinian Initiative (3)	Aida Baručija	4th FBiH
Our Party – Bosnian-Herzegovinian Initiative (3)	Predrag Kojović	3rd FBiH
Serb Club (DEMOS – United Srpska – SNSD) (3)	Milan Petković	1st RS
Serb Club (DEMOS – United Srpska – SNSD) (3)	Čedomir Stojanović	2nd RS
Serb Club (DEMOS – United Srpska – SNSD) (3)	Ljubica Miljanović	3rd RS
People's European Union – Forward (3)	Jasmin Emrić	1st FBiH
People's European Union – Forward (3)	Šemsudin Mehmedović	4th FBiH
People's European Union – Forward (3)	Elvisa Hodžić	1st FBiH
