= List of members of the House of Representatives of Bosnia and Herzegovina, 2026–2030 =

The 10th legislature of the House of Representatives of Bosnia and Herzegovina will be constituted on 1 December 2026 and will include 42 members elected in the general election on 4 October 2026, representing the 8 electoral units of Bosnia and Herzegovina, five of which in the Federation and three in Republika Srpska.

== MPs by party ==
Political party	Name	Electoral Unit
Party of Democratic Action (9)	Šemsudin Dedić	1st FBiH
Party of Democratic Action (9)	Šerif Špago	2nd FBiH
Party of Democratic Action (9)	Haris Zahiragić	3rd FBiH
Party of Democratic Action (9)	Mirsad Zaimović	4th FBiH
Party of Democratic Action (9)	Melika Mahmutbegović	4th FBiH
Party of Democratic Action (9)	Spahija Kozlić (Note: Refik Lendo was elected but refused to take his seat.)	4th FBiH
Party of Democratic Action (9)	Muamer Zukić	5th FBiH
Party of Democratic Action (9)	Midhat Čaušević	5th FBiH
Party of Democratic Action (9)	Mirela Avdić	5th FBiH
Alliance of Independent Social Democrats (6)	Snježana Novaković Bursać	1st RS
Alliance of Independent Social Democrats (6)	Milorad Kojić (Note: Srđan Amidžić was elected but refused to take his seat.)	1st RS
Alliance of Independent Social Democrats (6)	Obren Petrović	2nd RS
Alliance of Independent Social Democrats (6)	Sanja Vulić	2nd RS
Alliance of Independent Social Democrats (6)	Sandra Erkić	3rd RS
Alliance of Independent Social Democrats (6)	Radovan Višković	3rd RS
Social Democratic Party (5)	Albin Muslić	1st FBiH
Social Democratic Party (5)	Saša Magazinović	3rd FBiH
Social Democratic Party (5)	Irna Imamović (Note: Zukan Helez was elected but refused to take his seat.)	4th FBiH
Social Democratic Party (5)	Jasmin Imamović	5th FBiH
Social Democratic Party (5)	Azra Okić	5th FBiH
Croatian Democratic Union (4)	Predrag Kožul	2nd FBiH
Croatian Democratic Union (4)	Antea Čilić	2nd FBiH
Croatian Democratic Union (4)	Marinko Čavara	4th FBiH
Croatian Democratic Union (4)	Marina Pendeš (Note: Borjana Krišto was elected but refused to take her seat.)	4th FBiH
Safe Srpska Movement (2)	Branislav Borenović	1st RS
Safe Srpska Movement (2)	Igor Radojičić	1st RS
Party for Bosnia and Herzegovina (2)	Džemal Smajić	3rd FBiH
Party for Bosnia and Herzegovina (2)	Amra Švrakić	3rd FBiH
Serb Democratic Party (2)	Želimir Nešković	2nd RS
Serb Democratic Party (2)	Darko Babalj	3rd RS
Democratic Front (2)	Dženan Đonlagić	3rd FBiH
Democratic Front (2)	Zlatan Begić	5th FBiH
People and Justice (2)	Elmedin Konaković	3rd FBiH
People and Justice (2)	Denis Zvizdić	3rd FBiH
Croatian Democratic Union 1990 (1)	Ilija Cvitanović	2nd FBiH
Our Party (1)	Sabina Ćudić	3rd FBiH
People's European Union (1)	Jasmin Emrić	1st FBiH
For Justice and Order (1)	Nenad Grković	3rd RS
Democratic People's Alliance (1)	Nenad Nešić	3rd RS
Socialist Party (1)	Nedeljko Jović	2nd RS
United Srpska (1)	Milan Petković	1st RS
