= 1st electoral unit of the House of Representatives of Bosnia and Herzegovina (Federation of Bosnia and Herzegovina) =

Parliamentary constituency

1st electoral unit of the Federation of Bosnia and Herzegovina
- House of Representatives of Bosnia and Herzegovina constituency
- Electoral unit within Bosnia and Herzegovina

Current constituency
- Created: 2000
- Seats: 3
- Representatives: Šemsudin Dedić (SDA); Jasmin Emrić (NES); Albin Muslić (SDP)

The first electoral unit of the Federation of Bosnia and Herzegovina is a parliamentary constituency used to elect members to the House of Representatives of Bosnia and Herzegovina since 2000. It consists of Una-Sana Canton and Canton 10.

== Demographics ==
Ethnicity	Population	%
Bosniaks	254,049	71.1
Croats	69,677	19.5
Serbs	19,357	5.4
Did Not declare	2,062	0.6
Others	11,837	3.3
Unknown	406	0.1
Total	357,388	

== Representatives ==
Convocation	Representatives		
2000–2002	Adem Borić (SDA)	Senad Šarganović (SDP)	Mirko Barović (HDZ BiH)
2002–2006	Hazim Felić (SDA)	Ibrahim Ðedović (DNZ)	Filip Andrić (HDZ BiH)
2006–2010	Husein Nanić (SDA)	Rifat Dolić (DNZ)	Sadik Bahtić (SBiH)
2010–2014	Senad Šepić (SDA)	Nermin Purić (DNZ)	Hamdija Lipovača (SDP)
2014–2018	Senad Šepić (SDA)	Jasmin Emrić (A-SDA /NES)	Borjana Krišto (HDZ BiH)
2018–2022	Šemsudin Dedić (SDA)	Jasmin Emrić (A-SDA /NES)	Borjana Krišto (HDZ BiH)
2022–2026	Šemsudin Dedić (SDA)	Jasmin Emrić (A-SDA /NES)	Albin Muslić (SDP)
2026-2030	Šemsudin Dedić (SDA)	Jasmin Emrić (A-SDA /NES)	Albin Muslić (SDP)

== Election results ==
=== 2026 election ===
Party	Votes	%	Mandates
Party of Democratic Action	24,987	26.62	1
People's European Union - Forward! - Movement of Democratic Action	15,083	16.06	1
Social Democratic Party	11,09	11.81	1
Croatian Democratic Union and allies	8,604	9.16	0
Croatian Five	8,595	9.15	0
Party for Bosnia and Herzegovina	5,171	5.50	0
Democratic Front - Civic Alliance	5,122	5.45	0
People and Justice - Social Democrats	4,113	4.38	0
Labour Party	3,594	3.82	0
Our Party	2,541	2.70	0
Alliance of Independent Social Democrats	2,242	2.38	0
Bosnian-Herzegovinian Greens	1,428	1.52	0
Union for a Better Future of BiH	735	0.78	0
For Justice and Order	298	0.31	0
Republicans of Bosnia and Herzegovina	260	0.27	0

=== 2022 election ===
Party	Votes	Mandates
Party of Democratic Action	28287	1
NES	20103	1
Social Democratic Party	11723	1
DF	11413	0
Croatian Democratic Union	8149	0
HDZ 1990	7566	0
Labour Party	3727	0
People and Justice	3222	0
PzP–NB	2770	0
Party for Bosnia and Herzegovina	2623	0
Our Party	2422	0
Alliance of Independent Social Democrats	2268	0
Union for a Better Future of BiH	1642	0
Bosnian Party	1274	0
Croatian Republican Party	1072	0
Social Democrats	229	0
Democratic People's Alliance	188	0
Bosnia and Herzegovina Greens	162	0
Bosnian-Herzegovinian Patriotic Party	158	0
Party of Democratic Progress	134	0
Bosnia and Herzegovina Initiative	77	0
Movement of Democratic Action	68	0
United Srpska	63	0
Re-Balance	49	0
SMS	47	0
The Left Wing	45	0
Union for New Politics	44	0
Circle	28	0

=== 2018 election ===
Party	Votes	%	Mandates
Party of Democratic Action	27010	23.9	1
Party of Democratic Activity	19559	17.31	1
Croatian Democratic Union	12448	11.02	1
Social Democratic Party	10813	9.57	0
Democratic Front	10517	9.31	0
Labour Party	7735	6.84	0
Union for a Better Future of BiH	6391	5.66	0
HDZ 1990-HSP	6290	5.57	0
Independent Bloc	4010	3.55	0
Our Party	2919	2.58	0
Alliance of Independent Social Democrats	2232	1.98	0
People and Justice	976	0.86	0
Democratic People's Alliance	652	0.58	0
Bosnian-Herzegovinian Patriotic Party	568	0.5	0
Party for Bosnia and Herzegovina	502	0.44	0
Bosnian Party	228	0.2	0
Union for New Politics	108	0.1	0
Democratic Action Movement	32	0.03	0
Lijevo Krilo	18	0.02	0

=== 2014 election ===
Party	Votes	%	Mandates
Party of Democratic Action	34111	27695	1
Party of Democratic Activity	14227	11551	1
HDZ–HSS–HKDU–HSP-AS BiH–HSP HB	13176	10698	1
Democratic Front	13119	10652	0
Union for a Better Future of BiH	11602	9420	0
Social Democratic Party	11336	9204	0
Croatian Democratic Union 1990	5895	4786	0
Labour Party of Bosnia and Herzegovina	5612	4556	0
Alliance of Independent Social Democrats	4143	3364	0
SPP–SDU–DNZ	3890	3158	0
Bosnian-Herzegovinian Patriotic Party-Sefer Halilović	1795	1457	0
Party for Bosnia and Herzegovina	1420	1153	0
People's Party for Work and Betterment	1273	1034	0
Diaspora Party	1016	0.825	0
Social Democratic Union - Union for Us All	250	0.203	0
Bosnian Party	179	0.145	0
HSP–DSI	121	0.098	0
Total valid	123165	100	

=== 2010 election ===
Party	Votes	%	Mandates
Social Democratic Party	32757	23.87	1
Party of Democratic Action	27925	20.35	1
Democratic People's Union	14238	10.38	1
Croatian Democratic Union of BiH	10861	7.91	0
Party of Democratic Activity	10782	7.86	0
Union for a Better Future of BiH	8939	6.51	0
Party for Bosnia and Herzegovina	8080	5.89	0
People's Party for Work and Betterment	7176	5.23	0
Croatian Democratic Union 1990	7123	5.19	0
Alliance of Independent Social Democrats	4998	3.64	0
Democratic People's Alliance	1147	0.84	0
Our Party	1065	0.78	0
Patriotic Party	872	0.64	0
Bosnian Party	423	0.31	0
Social Democratic Union	357	0.26	0
Democratic Party of the disabled	256	0.19	0
People's Party	225	0.16	0
Total valid	137224	100	

=== 2006 election ===
Party	Votes	%	Mandates
Party of Democratic Action	33599	30.57	1
Party for Bosnia and Herzegovina	18339	16.69	1
Democratic People's Union	15329	13.95	1
Social Democratic Party	14952	13.60	0
Croatian Democratic Union 1990	5926	5.39	0
HDZ-HNZ	5051	4.60	0
Croatian Party of Rights	3273	2.98	0
People's Party for Work and Betterment	2416	2.20	0
Patriotic Party	2266	2.06	0
Pensioners' Party	1775	1.61	0
European Ecological Party	1601	1.46	0
Bosnian Patriotic Block	1501	1.37	0
Socialist Party	1241	1.13	0
Movement for changes	843	0.77	0
Youth Political Movement	722	0.66	0
Liberal Democratic Party	585	0.53	0
Democratic Party of the disabled	276	0.25	0
Civil Democratic Party	215	0.20	0
Total valid	109910	100	

=== 2002 election ===
Party	Votes	Mandates
Party of Democratic Action	33110	1
Democratic People's Union	15109	1
Croatian Democratic Union- Democrats	14291	1

=== 2000 election ===
Party	Votes	Mandates
Party of Democratic Action	44190	1
Croatian Democratic Union	22938	1
Social Democratic Party	19313	1
