= 4th electoral unit of the House of Representatives of Bosnia and Herzegovina (Federation of Bosnia and Herzegovina) =

Parliamentary constituency

4th electoral unit of the Federation of Bosnia and Herzegovina
- House of Representatives of Bosnia and Herzegovina constituency
- Electoral unit within Bosnia and Herzegovina

Current constituency
- Created: 2000
- Seats: 6
- Representatives: Mirsad Zaimović (SDA); Refik Lendo (SDA); Melika Mahmutbegović (SDA); Zijad Krnjić (SBiH); Zukan Helez (SDP); Marinko Čavara (HDZ BiH)

The fourth electoral unit of the Federation of Bosnia and Herzegovina is a parliamentary constituency used to elect members to the House of Representatives of Bosnia and Herzegovina since 2000. It consists of Zenica-Doboj Canton and Central Bosnia Canton.

== Demographics ==
Ethnicity	Population	%
Bosniaks	446,104	72.1
Croats	141,448	22.8
Serbs	8,586	1.4
Did Not declare	3,467	0.6
Others	18,048	2.9
Unknown	1,466	0.2
Total	619,119	

== Representatives ==
Convocation	Representatives					
2000–2002	Osman Brka (SDA)	Hilmo Neimarlija (SDA)	Hamdija Kulović (SBiH)	Muharem Imamović (SDP)	Omer Filipović (SDP)	Zdenko Vukić (HDZ BiH)
2002–2006	Šefik Džaferović (SDA)	Mirsad Ćeman (SDA)	Nadžida Mlaćo (SDA)	Adem Huskić (SBiH)	Jozo Križanović (SDP)	Niko Lozančić (HDZ BiH)
2006–2010	Šefik Džaferović (SDA)	Šemsudin Mehmedović (SDA)	Vahid Hećo (SBiH)	Ekrem Ajanović (SBiH)	Jozo Križanović (SDP)	Niko Lozančić (HDZ BiH)
2010–2014	Šefik Džaferović (SDA)	Šemsudin Mehmedović (SDA)	Adnan Bašić (SBB BiH)	Nermina Zaimović-Uzunović (SDP)	Mirsad Mešić (SDP)	Niko Lozančić (HDZ BiH)
2014–2018	Šefik Džaferović (SDA)	Šemsudin Mehmedović (SDA)	Mirsad Isaković (SBB BiH)	Mensura Beganović (DF)	Mirsad Mešić (SDP)	Nikola Lovrinović (HDZ BiH)
2018–2022	Nermin Mandra (SDA)	Šemsudin Mehmedović (SDA)	Fuad Kasumović (NB)	Vlatko Glavaš (DF)	Zukan Helez (SDP)	Nikola Lovrinović (HDZ BiH)
2022–2026	Nermin Mandra (SDA)	Šemsudin Mehmedović (SDA)	Aida Baručija (BHI)	Vlatko Glavaš (DF)	Zukan Helez (SDP)	Marinko Čavara (HDZ BiH)
2026-2030	Mirsad Zaimović (SDA)	Refik Lendo (SDA)	Melika Mahmutbegović (SDA)	Zijad Krnjić (SBiH)	Zukan Helez (SDP)	Marinko Čavara (HDZ BiH)

== Election results ==
=== 2026 election ===
Party	Votes	%	Mandates
Party of Democratic Action	81,14	36.91	3
Social Democratic Party	37,171	16.91	1
Croatian Democratic Union and allies	30,789	14.00	1
Party for Bosnia and Herzegovina	17,294	7.86	1
Democratic Front - Civic Alliance	11,284	5.13	0
Croatian Five	9,924	4.51	0
Bosnian-Herzegovinian Initiative	9,502	4.32	0
People and Justice - Social Democrats	8,331	3.79	0
People's European Union - Forward! - Movement of Democratic Action	5,36	2.43	0
Our Party	4,756	2.16	0
Bosnian-Herzegovinian Greens	2,331	1.06	0
Union for a Better Future of BiH	1,768	0.80	0
Alliance of Independent Social Democrats	164	0.07	0

=== 2022 election ===
Party	Votes	Mandates
Party of Democratic Action	84772	2
Croatian Democratic Union	41774	1
Social Democratic Party	33526	1
DF	30556	1
Bosnian-Herzegovinian Initiative	18240	1
People and Justice	14698	0
Union for a Better Future of BiH	7982	0
NES	7141	0
Our Party	5394	0
PzP–NB	4876	0
HDZ 1990	4185	0
Party for Bosnia and Herzegovina	2819	0
Bosnian Party	2475	0
Croatian Republican Party	819	0
Social Democrats	502	0
Movement of Democratic Action	339	0
Bosnia and Herzegovina Greens	324	0
Alliance of Independent Social Democrats	158	0
Union for New Politics	131	0
SMS	87	0
The Left Wing	56	0
Party of Democratic Progress	52	0
Re-Balance	38	0
Circle	25	0

=== 2018 election ===
Party	Votes	%	Mandates
Party of Democratic Action	86033	31.56	2
Croatian Democratic Union	43895	16.1	1
Social Democratic Party	40032	14.69	1
Independent Bloc	29869	10.96	1
Democratic Front	22900	8.4	1
Union for a Better Future of BiH	17734	6.51	0
Party for Bosnia and Herzegovina	5741	2.11	0
Party of Democratic Activity	5289	1.94	0
Our Party	4715	1.73	0
HDZ 1990-HSP	4665	1.71	0
Bosnian-Herzegovinian Patriotic Party	3132	1.15	0
Pensioners Party	2829	1.04	0
Democratic Action Movement	1726	0.63	0
Croatian Party BiH	1095	0.4	0
Independent Bosnia-Herzegovina List	892	0.33	0
Bosnian Party	799	0.29	0
People and Justice	658	0.24	0
Alliance of Independent Social Democrats	304	0.11	0
Union for New Politics	188	0.07	0
Lijevo Krilo	73	0.03	0

=== 2014 election ===
Party	Votes	%	Mandates
Party of Democratic Action	83927	30.872	2
Union for a Better Future of BiH	47787	17.578	1
HDZ–HSS–HKDU–HSP-AS BiH–HSP HB	36182	13.309	1
Democratic Front	34630	12.739	1
Social Democratic Party	25961	9.55	1
Croatian Democratic Union 1990	11124	4.092	0
Bosnian-Herzegovinian Patriotic Party-Sefer Halilović	9199	3.384	0
Party of Democratic Activity	7861	2.892	0
Party for Bosnia and Herzegovina	6820	2.509	0
People's Party for Work and Betterment	2251	0.828	0
SPP–SDU–DNZ	2153	0.792	0
HSP–DSI	881	0.324	0
Bosnian Party	800	0.294	0
New Beginning	729	0.268	0
Hrvatski Savez Hkdu - Hrast	638	0.235	0
Social Democratic Union - Union for Us All	473	0.174	0
Diaspora Party	435	0.16	0
Total Valid	271851	100	

=== 2010 election ===
Party	Votes	%	Mandates
Social Democratic Party	68360	23.98	2
Party of Democratic Action	64352	22.58	2
Union for a Better Future of BiH	40082	14.06	1
Croatian Democratic Union of BiH	33201	11.65	1
Party for Bosnia and Herzegovina	20712	7.27	0
People's Party for Work and Betterment	17993	6.31	0
Croatian Democratic Union 1990	11041	3.87	0
Patriotic Party	7683	2.70	0
Retirement Party	5109	1.79	0
HSS - NHI	3123	1.10	0
Bosnian Party	3000	1.05	0
People's Party	2598	0.91	0
Party of Democratic Activity	2225	0.78	0
Our Party	2071	0.73	0
Democratic Party of the disabled	836	0.29	0
Alliance of Independent Social Democrats	831	0.29	0
Liberal Democratic Party	722	0.25	0
Social Democratic Union	431	0.15	0
Democratic People's Union	326	0.11	0
GDS-NEP	320	0.11	0
Total Valid	285016	100	

=== 2006 election ===
Party	Votes	%	Mandates
Party of Democratic Action	63645	27.17	2
Party for Bosnia and Herzegovina	58008	24.76	2
Social Democratic Party	25734	10.99	1
HDZ-HNZ	25133	10.73	1
Patriotic Party	14587	6.23	0
Croatian Democratic Union 1990	12679	5.41	0
People's Party for Work and Betterment	758	3.24	0
Croatian Party of Rights	5633	2.40	0
Bosnian Patriotic Block	4363	1.86	0
Pensioners' Party	4062	1.73	0
Youth Political Movement	2117	0.90	0
Bosnian National Party	2045	0.87	0
Movement for changes	1881	0.80	0
Civil Democratic Party	1543	0.66	0
European Ecological Party	1378	0.59	0
Alliance of Independent Social Democrats	1209	0.52	0
Liberal Democratic Party	1077	0.46	0
Democratic Party of the disabled	862	0.37	0
Democratic People's Union	309	0.13	0
Democratic People's Alliance	232	0.10	0
Free Democrats	180	0.08	0
Total Valid	227674	100	

=== 2002 election ===
Party	Votes	Mandates
Party of Democratic Action	85979	3
Croatian Democratic Union- Democrats	32374	1
Party for Bosnia and Herzegovina	30658	1
Social Democratic Party	27125	1

=== 2000 election ===
Party	Votes	Mandates
Party of Democratic Action	79836	2
Social Democratic Party	65293	2
Croatian Democratic Union	45409	1
Party for Bosnia and Herzegovina	42494	1
