= 2014 Federation of Bosnia and Herzegovina general election =

Entity election in Bosnia and Herzegovina

- 12 October 2014
- 98 seats in the House of Representatives; 50 seats needed for a majority
Party	Leader	Vote %	Seats	+/–
SDA	Bakir Izetbegović	27.79	29	+6
SBB	Fahrudin Radončić	14.71	16	+3
DF	Željko Komšić	12.90	14	New
HDZ BiH and allies	Dragan Čović	11.93	12	0
SDP BiH	Zlatko Lagumdžija	10.14	12	−16
HDZ 1990	Martin Raguž	4.04	4	−1
BPS	Sefer Halilović	3.72	4	+4
SBiH	Amer Jerlagić	3.30	3	−6
A-SDA	Nermin Ogrešević	2.25	2	+1
NS	Dennis Gratz	1.54	1	+1
LS BiH	Elvira Abdić-Jelenović	0.57	1	+1
This lists parties that won seats. See the complete results below.
Prime Minister before	Prime Minister after
Nermin Nikšić; SDP	Fadil Novalić; SDA

General elections were held in the Federation of Bosnia and Herzegovina on 12 October 2014 as part of the Bosnian general elections. Voters elected the 98 members of the House of Representatives of the Federation of Bosnia and Herzegovina and the assemblies of the cantons of the Federation of Bosnia and Herzegovina.

== Electoral system ==
=== Presidency ===
The president of the Federation of Bosnia and Herzegovina and the two vice-presidents are not elected by direct election: The first chamber of the Federal Parliament, the House of Peoples, nominates candidates for the presidency and the vice-presidencies, followed by the second chamber, the House of Representatives, must confirm this nomination by election. Subsequently, confirmation by the majority of the delegates of all three constitutive ethnic groups in the House of Peoples is required.

=== House of Representatives ===
The House of Representatives of the Federation of Bosnia and Herzegovina has a total of 98 members who are elected by proportional representation. The election takes place in 12 multi-person constituencies with entity-wide balancing mandates. In the Federal House of Representatives, each constitutive ethnic group should be represented by at least four members. The threshold is three percent.

=== Cantonal Assemblies ===
The assemblies of the 10 cantons of the Federation are also elected. The election is based on proportional representation with a threshold of three percent. The individual cantonal assemblies send members to the House of Peoples.

== Results ==
=== House of Representatives ===
Party	Votes	%	Seats		
Party	Votes	%	Direct	Compensatory	Total
Party of Democratic Action	275,728	27.79	21	8	29
Union for a Better Future	145,946	14.71	13	3	16
Democratic Front	128,058	12.90	10	4	14
HDZ–HSS–HKDU–HSP AS–HSP BA	118,375	11.93	11	1	12
Social Democratic Party	100,626	10.14	10	2	12
Croatian Democratic Union 1990	40,125	4.04	4	0	4
Bosnian-Herzegovinian Patriotic Party	36,873	3.72	0	4	4
Party for Bosnia and Herzegovina	32,790	3.30	0	3	3
Party of Democratic Activity	22,334	2.25	2	0	2
Our Party	15,248	1.54	1	0	1
People's Party Work for Prosperity	15,121	1.52	0	0	0
Together for Change (SPP–SDU–SP/U–DNZ–LDS)	13,633	1.37	0	0	0
Strong BiH (HSP–DSI)	6,775	0.68	0	0	0
Alliance of Independent Social Democrats	6,669	0.67	0	0	0
Bosnian Party	6,162	0.62	0	0	0
Labour Party	5,607	0.57	1	0	1
Social Democratic Union – Union for Us All	4,751	0.48	0	0	0
Diaspora Party	4,422	0.45	0	0	0
Croatian Union HKDU/HRAST	4,289	0.43	0	0	0
Communist Party	3,076	0.31	0	0	0
New Movement	2,201	0.22	0	0	0
Regional Democratic Alliance of Tuzla	1,202	0.12	0	0	0
Coalition for Change (SNS–NDP)	687	0.07	0	0	0
First Party	448	0.05	0	0	0
Serb Democratic Party	168	0.02	0	0	0
"New Serbia" Party	112	0.01	0	0	0
Independents	916	0.09	0	0	0
Total	992,342	100.00	73	25	98
Valid votes	992,342	91.81			
Invalid/blank votes	88,546	8.19			
Total votes	1,080,888	100.00			
Source: CEC

=== Assemblies of the Cantons ===
Party	Una-Sana			Posavina			Tuzla			Zenica-Doboj			Bosnian-Podrinje Goražde			Central Bosnia			Herzegovina-Neretva			West Herzegovina			Sarajevo			10		
Party	Votes	%	S	Votes	%	S	Votes	%	S	Votes	%	S	Votes	%	S	Votes	%	S	Votes	%	S	Votes	%	S	Votes	%	S	Votes	%	S
SDA	31525	32.386	10	2095	12.141	3	68397	32.229	13	46811	28.603	11	3114	22.027	6	28458	25.695	8	20610	20.829	7	-	-	-	52844	25.016	10	2144	7.225	2
SBB BiH	9490	9.749	3	636	3.686	1	26339	12.411	5	32090	19.608	8	2613	18.483	5	12148	10.969	4	8308	8.396	3	-	-	-	35179	16.653	7	244	0.822	-
DF	11212	11.518	4	516	2.990	-	23259	10.960	4	20553	12.559	5	957	6.769	2	9443	8.526	3	5619	5.679	2	-	-	-	36129	17.103	7	450	1.517	-
HDZ BiH	438	0.450	-	5681	32.922	7	5025	2.368	-	9763	5.966	2	-	-	-	25213	22.765	8	31910	32.249	11	19208	56.564	14	1505	0.712	-	9070	30.567	9
SDP	10550	10.838	4	523	3.031	1	29078	13.702	6	18519	11.316	4	1191	8.425	2	12041	10.872	4	7645	7.726	3	617	1.817	-	19866	9.404	4	1306	4.401	1
SBiH	2450	2.517	-	275	1.594	-	17751	8.364	3	7267	4.440	2	1207	8.538	2	2417	2.182	-	1810	1.829	-	-	-	-	5387	2.550	-	130	0.438	-
HDZ 1990	410	0.421	-	5123	29.688	7	668	0.315	-	2538	1.551	-	-	-	-	7492	6.765	2	8916	9.011	3	5117	15.069	4	1123	0.532	-	4497	15.155	4
BPS	1199	1.232	-	-	-	-	9339	4.401	2	6391	3.905	1	828	5.857	2	3273	2.955	-	3646	3.685	1	-	-	-	10165	4.812	2	-	-	-
A-SDA	16526	16.977	6	-	-	-	-	-	-	9121	5.573	2	524	3.707	1	2462	2.223	-	-	-	-	-	-	-	-	-	-	-	-	-
NSRzB	547	0.562	-	420	2.434	-	9415	4.436	2	2524	1.542	-	318	2.249	-	1482	1.338	-	642	0.649	-	1906	5.613	1	2521	1.193	-	1750	5.898	2
HSP	69	0.071	-	660	3.825	1	384	0.181	-	287	0.175	-	12	0.085	-	3501	3.161	1	1726	1.744	-	2240	6.596	2	1233	0.584	-	1646	5.547	2
Others	12926	13.279	3	1327	7.690	1	22566	10.633	-	7793	4.762	-	3373	23.859	5	2823	2.549	-	8118	8.204	-	4870	14.341	2	45293	21.441	5	8436	28.430	5
Total	97342	100	30	17256	100	21	212221	100	35	163657	100	35	14137	100	25	110753	100	30	98950	100	30	33958	100	23	211245	100	35	29673	100	25
Source: CEC

== Aftermath ==
Four months after the elections, Marinko Čavara (HDZ) was elected president. Six months after the elections, Fadil Novalić (SDA) was elected prime minister, heading a coalition of the SDA, HDZ, and DF.

== See also ==
- 2014 Bosnian general election
- 2014 Republika Srpska general election
