= 5th electoral unit of the House of Representatives of Bosnia and Herzegovina (Federation of Bosnia and Herzegovina) =

Parliamentary constituency

5th electoral unit of the Federation of Bosnia and Herzegovina
- House of Representatives of Bosnia and Herzegovina constituency
- Electoral unit within Bosnia and Herzegovina

Current constituency
- Created: 2000
- Seats: 5
- Representatives: Muamer Zukić (SDA); Midhat Čaušević (SDA); Mirela Avdić (SDA); Jasmin Imamović (SDP); Zlatan Begić (DF)

The fifth electoral unit of the Federation of Bosnia and Herzegovina is a parliamentary constituency used to elect members to the House of Representatives of Bosnia and Herzegovina since 2000. It consists of Posavina Canton, Tuzla Canton and Brčko District (FBiH option).

== Demographics ==
Ethnicity	Population	%
Bosniaks	435,989	76.2
Croats	74,444	13.0
Serbs	36,773	6.4
Did Not declare	4,180	0.7
Others	19,651	3.4
Unknown	960	0.2
Total	571,997	

== Representatives ==
Convocation	Representatives				
2000–2002	Salih Kulenović (SDA)	Ramiz Vilić (SDA)	Sead Avdić (SDP)	Mirza Kušljugić (SDP)	Muhamed Begović (SBiH)
2002–2006	Izet Hadžić (SDA)	Seada Palavrić (SDA)	Sead Avdić (SDP)	Selim Bešlagić (SDP)	Izet Žigić (SBiH)
2006–2010	Bajazit Jašarević (SDA)	Sead Jamakosmanović (SDA)	Denis Bećirović (SDP)	Selim Bešlagić (SDP)	Mehmed Suljkanović (SBiH)
2010–2014	Amir Fazlić (SDA)	Zijad Jagodić (SDA)	Denis Bećirović (SDP)	Mirza Kušljugić (SDP)	Emir Kabil (SBB BiH)
2014–2018	Amir Fazlić (SDA)	Safer Demirović (SDA)	Denis Bećirović (SDP)	Damir Bećirović (DF)	Mirsad Ðonlagić (SBB BiH)
2018–2022	Safet Softić (SDA)	Mirsad Kukić (PDA)	Enver Bijedić (SDP)	Zlatan Begić (DF)	Mijo Matanović (HDZ BiH)
2022–2026	Midhat Čaušević (SDA)	Denijal Tulumović (SDA)	Jasmin Imamović (SDP)	Zlatan Begić (DF)	Rejhana Dervišević (SDP)
2026-2030	Midhat Čaušević (SDA)	Muamer Zukić (SDA)	Jasmin Imamović (SDP)	Zlatan Begić (DF)	Mirela Avdić (SDA)

== Election results ==
=== 2026 election ===
Party	Votes	%	Mandates
Party of Democratic Action	71,116	38.09	3
Social Democratic Party	35,237	18.87	1
Democratic Front - Civic Alliance	16,749	8.97	1
People and Justice - Social Democrats	14,02	7.51	0
Croatian Democratic Union and allies	11,963	6.40	0
Party for Bosnia and Herzegovina	10,533	5.64	0
People's European Union - Forward! - Movement of Democratic Action	8,322	4.45	0
Our Party	7,413	3.97	0
Union for a Better Future of BiH	4,339	2.32	0
Bosnian-Herzegovinian Greens	3,094	1.65	0
Croatian Five	2,257	1.20	0
Red Lines	603	0.32	0
Republicans of Bosnia and Herzegovina	563	0.30	0
Alliance of Independent Social Democrats	472	0.25	0

=== 2022 election ===
Party	Votes	Mandates
Party of Democratic Action	64208	2
Social Democratic Party	44337	2
DF	29378	1
Croatian Democratic Union	14686	0
Movement of Democratic Action	14482	0
Bosnian Party	11387	0
People and Justice	9693	0
Social Democrats	7959	0
Party for Bosnia and Herzegovina	7814	0
Our Party	7110	0
Union for a Better Future of BiH	6123	0
PzP–NB	5,06	0
NES	1659	0
HDZ 1990	1002	0
Bosnia and Herzegovina Greens	870	0
Croatian Republican Party	616	0
Alliance of Independent Social Democrats	437	0
Bosnia and Herzegovina Initiative	185	0
Union for New Politics	113	0
Party of Democratic Progress	106	0
SMS	40	0
The Left Wing	37	0
Re-Balance	26	0
Circle	20	0

=== 2018 election ===
Party	Votes	%	Mandates
Party of Democratic Action	53368	22.44	1
Social Democratic Party	52193	21.94	1
Movement of Democratic Action	36659	15.41	1
Democratic Front	27279	11.47	1
Croatian Democratic Union	18101	7.61	1
Union for a Better Future of BiH	13026	5.48	0
Our Party	7059	2.97	0
Party for Bosnia and Herzegovina	6814	2.86	0
Independent Bosnia-Herzegovina List	5588	2.35	0
Bosnian-Herzegovinian Patriotic Party	3925	1.65	0
Bosnian Party	2759	1.16	0
HDZ 1990-HSP	2712	1.14	0
Party of Democratic Activity	2709	1.14	0
Independent Bloc	2267	0.95	0
Pensioners Party	1696	0.71	0
LDS za Boljitak	1076	0.45	0
Alliance of Independent Social Democrats	391	0.16	0
Union for New Politics	148	0.06	0
Lijevo Krilo	81	0.03	0

=== 2014 election ===
Party	Votes	%	Mandates
Party of Democratic Action	76139	32.545	2
Democratic Front	34269	14.648	1
Union for a Better Future of BiH	33431	14.29	1
Social Democratic Party	33206	14.194	1
HDZ–HSS–HKDU–HSP-AS BiH–HSP HB	13511	5.775	0
Party for Bosnia and Herzegovina	11357	4.854	0
Bosnian-Herzegovinian Patriotic Party-Sefer Halilović	10130	4.33	0
Croatian Democratic Union 1990	5999	2.564	0
People's Party for Work and Betterment	4575	1.956	0
Bosnian Party	4212	1.8	0
SPP–SDU–DNZ	2166	0.926	0
Social Democratic Union - Union for Us All	1700	0.727	0
Communist Party	1631	0.697	0
Alliance of Independent Social Democrats	472	0.202	0
HSP–DSI	451	0.193	0
Diaspora Party	434	0.186	0
New Beginning	267	0.114	0
Total valid	233950	100	

=== 2010 election ===
Party	Votes	%	Mandates
Social Democratic Party	87277	35,91	2
Party of Democratic Action	54109	22,26	2
Union for a Better Future of BiH	27055	11,13	1
Croatian Democratic Union of BiH	15823	6,51	0
Party for Bosnia and Herzegovina	14059	5,78	0
Bosnian Party	9498	3,91	0
People's Party for Work and Betterment	6968	2,87	0
Patriotic Party	5946	2,45	0
Croatian Democratic Union 1990	5414	2,23	0
Jump Cacaus	4088	1,68	0
Party of Democratic Activity	3176	1,31	0
Retirement Party	2545	1,05	0
Our Party	2058	0,85	0
Democratic Party of the disabled	1518	0,62	0
Social Democratic Union	1287	0,53	0
GDS-NEP	1035	0,43	0
Liberal Democratic Party	597	0,25	0
Alliance of Independent Social Democrats	583	0,24	0
Total valid	243036	100	

=== 2006 election ===
Party	Votes	%	Mandates
Party of Democratic Action	60744	30,27	2
Social Democratic Party	52612	26,22	2
Party for Bosnia and Herzegovina	34502	17,19	1
HDZ-HNZ	9312	4,64	0
People's Party for Work and Betterment	8207	4,09	0
Bosnian Patriotic Block	7512	3,74	0
Patriotic Party	6459	3,22	0
Croatian Democratic Union 1990	6151	3,06	0
Pensioners' Party	219	1,09	0
Liberal Democratic Party	1848	0,92	0
Democratic Party of the disabled	1806	0,90	0
Movement for changes	1476	0,74	0
Croatian Party of Rights	1439	0,72	0
Free Democrats	116	0,58	0
Youth Political Movement	1159	0,58	0
Alliance of Independent Social Democrats	931	0,46	0
European Ecological Party	917	0,46	0
Civil Democratic Party	879	0,44	0
Justice and Morals	684	0,34	0
Bosnian National Party	487	0,24	0
Democratic People's Union	211	0,11	0
Total valid	197671	100	

=== 2002 election ===
Party	Votes	Mandates
Party of Democratic Action	53594	2
Social Democratic Party	39787	2
Party for Bosnia and Herzegovina	21626	1

=== 2000 election ===
Party	Votes	Mandates
Social Democratic Party	72852	2
Party of Democratic Action	54078	2
Party for Bosnia and Herzegovina	19637	1
