= Jasmin Emrić =

Bosnian politician (born 1969)

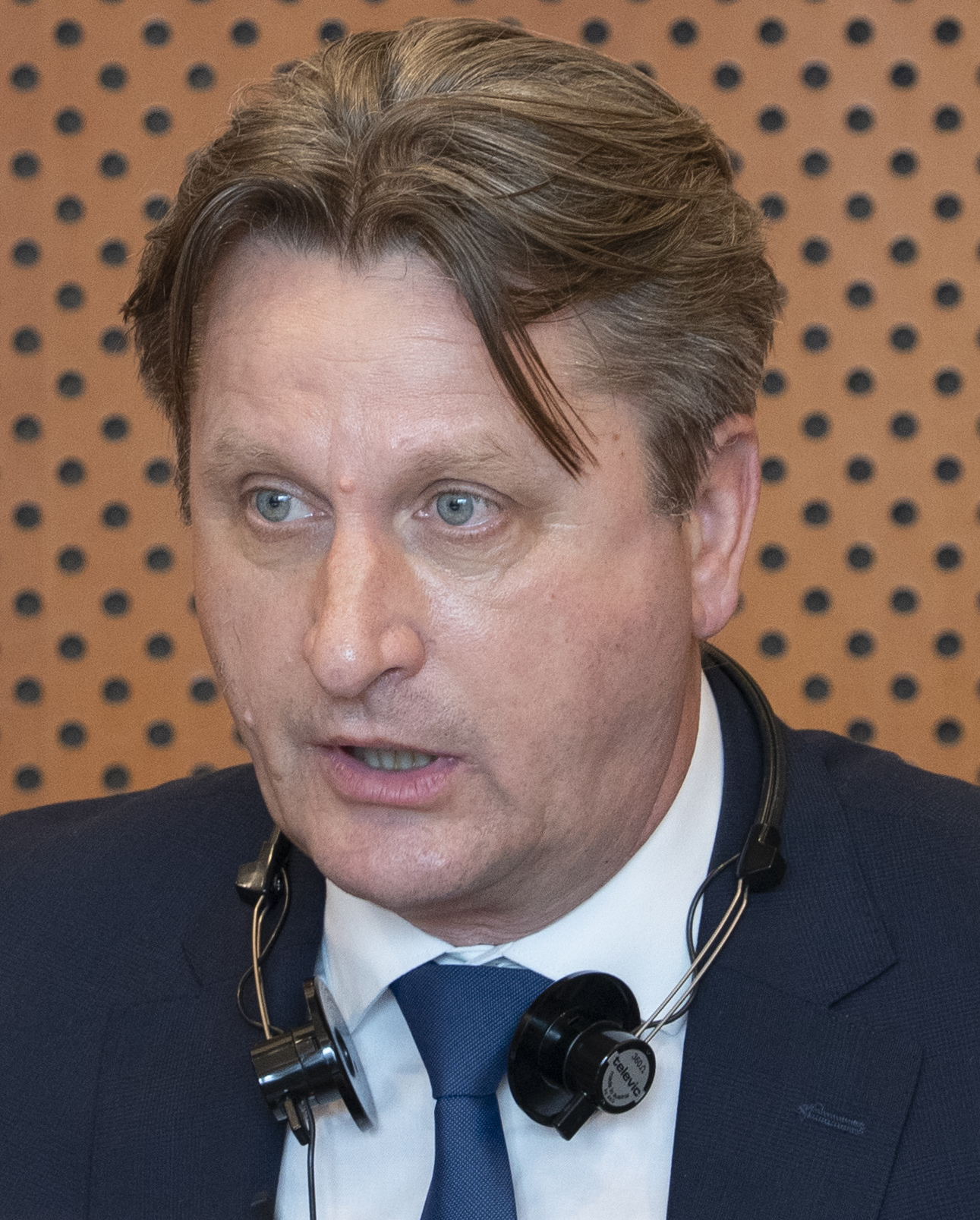
- Emrić in 2025

Member of the House of Representatives
- Incumbent
- Assumed office 9 December 2014
- Constituency: 1st Electoral Unit

Mayor of Bužim
- In office 2000–2008
- Preceded by: Ekrem Pehić
- Succeeded by: Mirsad Šahinović

Personal details
- Born: 29 November 1969 (age 56) Bužim, SR Bosnia and Herzegovina, SFR Yugoslavia
- Party: People's European Union (2021–present)
- Other political affiliations: Party of Democratic Activity (until 2021); Party of Democratic Action
- Children: 2

Jasmin Emrić (born 29 November 1969) is a Bosnian politician serving as member of the national House of Representatives since 2014. From 2000 to 2008, he served as mayor of his hometown Bužim.

Emrić is a member of the People's European Union, having previously been a member of the Party of Democratic Activity and the Party of Democratic Action.

== Early life ==
Emrić was born in Bužim, SR Bosnia and Herzegovina, then part of SFR Yugoslavia. His parliamentary biography indicates that he is an engineer in the field of geodesy and that he was the director of the organization GEOID in Bihać until 2014.

== Political career ==
Emrić was elected to the municipal council of Bužim as a candidate of the Party of Democratic Action (SDA) in 2000. The SDA won a landslide majority in this election, and Emrić was subsequently chosen by councillors as the city's mayor. He left the SDA at some point between 2000 and 2004 and was re-elected as mayor as an independent candidate in the 2004 municipal elections, the first to be held after Bosnia and Herzegovina introduced the direct election of mayors. He joined the Party of Democratic Activity (A-SDA) in 2008 and was defeated by SDA candidate Mirsad Šahinović in the 2008 municipal elections.

Emrić was elected to the Una-Sana Cantonal Assembly in the 2010 general election and served until the end of his term in 2014, leading a four-member grouping from his party. He was elected to the national House of Representatives in the 2014 general election, and was re-elected in the 2018 and 2022 general elections.

== Personal life ==
Emrić is married and has two children.
