= 1st electoral unit of the House of Representatives of Bosnia and Herzegovina (Republika Srpska) =

Parliamentary constituency

1st electoral unit of Republika Srpska
- House of Representatives of Bosnia and Herzegovina constituency
- Electoral unit within Republika Srpska (Bosnia and Herzegovina)

Current constituency
- Created: 2000
- Seats: 3
- Representatives: Srđan Amidžić (SNSD); Snježana Bursać (SNSD); Branislav Borenović (PDP)

The first electoral unit of Republika Srpska is a parliamentary constituency used to elect members to the House of Representatives of Bosnia and Herzegovina since 2000. It consists of the municipalities of Krupa na Uni, Novi Grad, Kozarska Dubica, Prijedor, Ostra Luka, Kostajnica, Gradiska, Latasi, Srbac, Prnjavor, Petrovac, Banja Luka, Čelinac, Istočni Drvar, Ribnik, Mrkonjić Grad, Jezero, Kneževo, Kotor Varoš, Šipovo and Kupres.

== Demographics ==
Ethnicity	Population	%
Bosniaks	65,302	11.8
Croats	10,901	1.9
Serbs	462,019	83.5
Did Not declare	5,097	0.9
Others	9,325	1.7
Unknown	977	0.2
Total	553,621	

== Representatives ==
Convocation	Representatives		
2000–2002	Žеljkо Mirjаnić (SNSD)	Brаnkо Dоkić (PDP)	Mirkо Bаnjаc (SDS)
2002–2006	Nikola Špirić (SNSD)	Nikola Kragulj (SNSD)	Mоmčilо Nоvakоvić (SDS)
2006–2010	Nikola Špirić (SNSD)	Drago Kalabić (SNSD)	Mоmčilо Nоvakоvić (SDS)
2010–2014	Nikola Špirić (SNSD)	Dušаnkа Mаjkić (SNSD)	Bоrislаv Bоjić (SDS)
2014–2018	Nikola Špirić (SNSD)	Dušаnkа Mаjkić (SNSD)	Ðorđo Krčmar (SDS)
2018–2022	Nebojša Radmanović (SNSD)	Branislav Borenović (PDP)	Dragan Mektić (SDS)
2022–2026	Nebojša Radmanović (SNSD)	Branislav Borenović (PDP)	Milorad Kojić (SNSD)
2026-2030	Srđan Amidžić (SNSD)	Branislav Borenović (PDP)	Snježana Bursać (SNSD)

== Election results ==
=== 2026 election ===
Party	Votes	%	Mandates
Alliance of Independent Social Democrats	93,236	38.42	2
Safe Srpska Movement and allies	48,119	19.83	1
Serb Democratic Party	21,213	8.74	0
For Justice and Order	17,058	7.02	0
United Srpska	11,422	4.70	0
Democratic People's Alliance	10,895	4.48	0
Socialist Party - Democratic Union	10,248	4.22	0
Socialist Party of Srpska	8,702	3.58	0
People's Front	6,201	2.55	0
The will of the People of Srpska	5,887	2.42	0
Party of Democratic Action	4,889	2.01	0
Party for Bosnia and Herzegovina	2,403	0.99	0
People and Justice - Social Democrats	1,458	0.60	0
Croatian Democratic Union and allies	473	0.19	0
Republicans of Bosnia and Herzegovina	450	0.18	0

=== 2022 election ===
Party	Votes	Mandates
Alliance of Independent Social Democrats	117676	2
Party of Democratic Progress	52397	1
Serb Democratic Party	35831	0
For Justice and Order	15635	0
United Srpska	11613	0
Party of Democratic Action	9423	0
Socialist Party	8009	0
Democratic People's Alliance	7,37	0
Democratic Union	7249	0
PzP–NB	5184	0
Social Democrats	1228	0
Union for a Better Future of BiH	854	0
Party of Life	841	0
Bosnia and Herzegovina Greens	671	0
Croatian Democratic Union	588	0
Bosnia and Herzegovina Initiative	362	0
The Left Wing	228	0
SMS	179	0
HDZ 1990	173	0
Union for New Politics	151	0
Re-Balance	143	0
Circle	95	0

=== 2018 election ===
Party	Votes	%	Mandates
Alliance of Independent Social Democrats	116915	40.01	1
Party of Democratic Progress	53406	18.27	1
Serb Democratic Party	52365	17.92	1
Democratic People's Alliance	30934	10.58	0
Socialist Party	13399	4.58	0
Party of Democratic Action	9967	3.41	0
Social Democratic Party	4493	1.54	0
First Serb Democratic Party	3485	1.19	0
Advanced Serb Party	2743	0.94	0
Croatian Democratic Union	2378	0.81	0
Union for a Better Future of BiH	1394	0.48	0
Party of Democratic Activity	443	0.15	0
Lijevo Krilo	322	0.11	0

=== 2010 election ===
Party	Votes	%	Mandates
Alliance of Independent Social Democrats	133234	55.52	2
Serb Democratic Party	36465	15.19	1
Progressive Democratic Party	1162	4.84	0
Party for Bosnia and Herzegovina	1115	4.59	0
Democratic People's Alliance	9289	3.87	0
Serbian Radical Party	8511	3.55	0
Party of Democratic Action	5574	2.32	0
Pensioners' Party- DNS	4712	1.96	0
SRS -DR VOJISLAV ŠEŠELJ BIJELJINA	3989	1.66	0
Social Democratic Party	3285	1.37	0
Socialist Party	2683	1.12	0
People's Party for Work and Betterment	2553	1.06	0
Serb Democratic Movement	2281	0.95	0
HDZ-HNZ	1145	0.48	0
Croatian Party of Rights	859	0.36	0
New Serbian Force	851	0.35	0
DSS- Serb Democratic Party	744	0.31	0
Youth Political Movement	450	0.19	0
European Ecological Party	234	0.10	0
Democratic People's Union	198	0.08	0
Civil Democratic Party	169	0.07	0
Patriotic Party	134	0.06	0
Total valid	219637	100	

=== 2002 election ===
Party	Votes	Mandates
Alliance of Independent Social Democrats	78504	2
Serb Democratic Party	61977	1

=== 2000 election ===
Party	Votes	Mandates
Serb Democratic Party	86010	1
Party of Democratic Progress	45183	1
Alliance of Independent Social Democrats	39857	1
