= 2014 Bosnian general election =

- 12 October 2014
- Turnout: 54.47% (presidential) ▼2.10 pp 54.47% (parliamentary) ▼2.06 pp
- Bosniak member of the Presidency
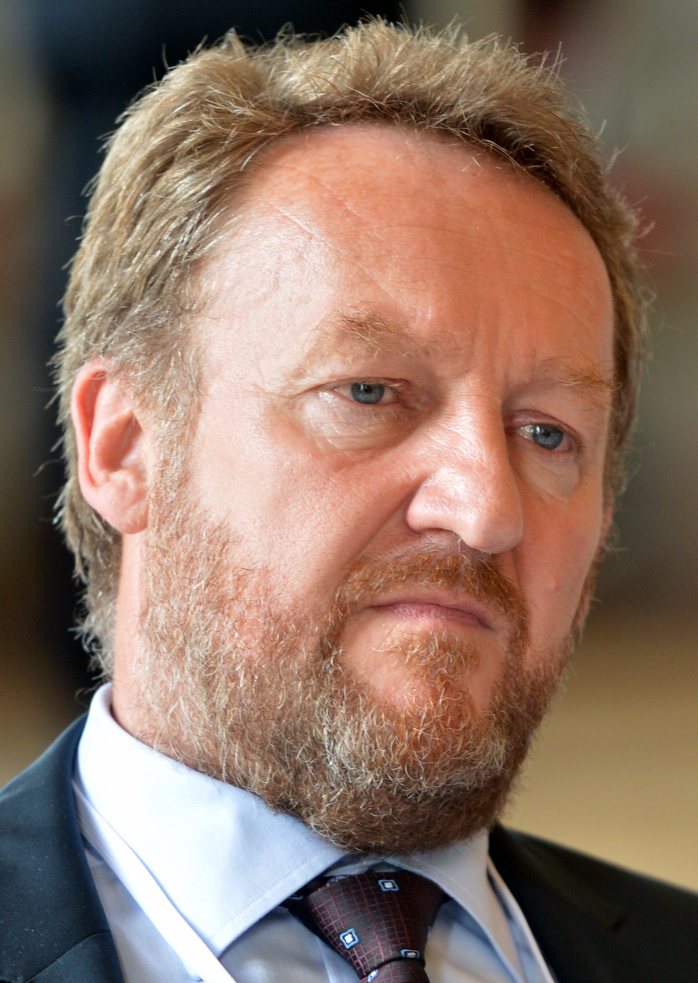

Candidate	Bakir Izetbegović	Fahrudin Radončić
Party	SDA	SBB
Popular vote	247,235	201,454
Percentage	32.87%	26.78%
- Croat member of the Presidency
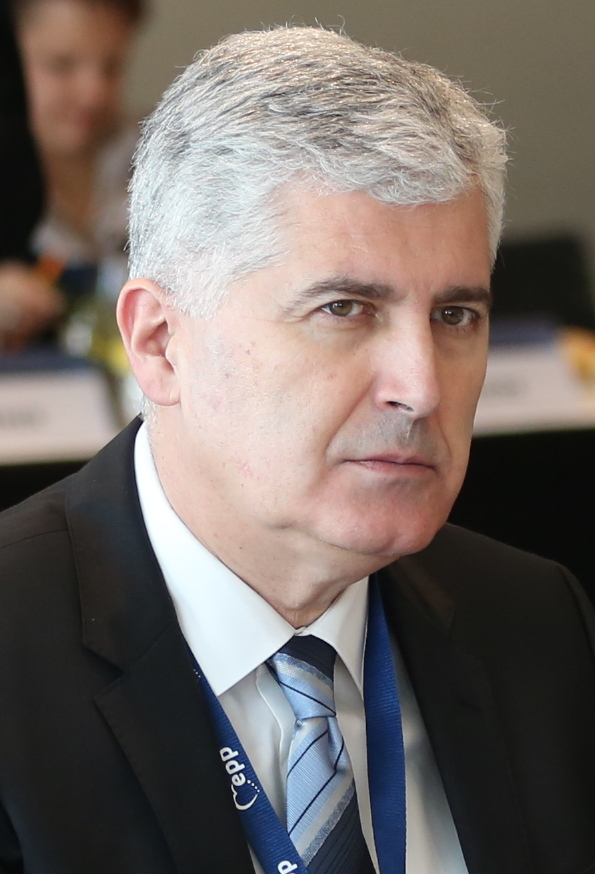

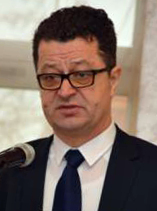
Candidate	Dragan Čović	Martin Raguž
Party	HDZ BiH	HDZ 1990
Popular vote	128,053	94,695
Percentage	52.20%	38.60%
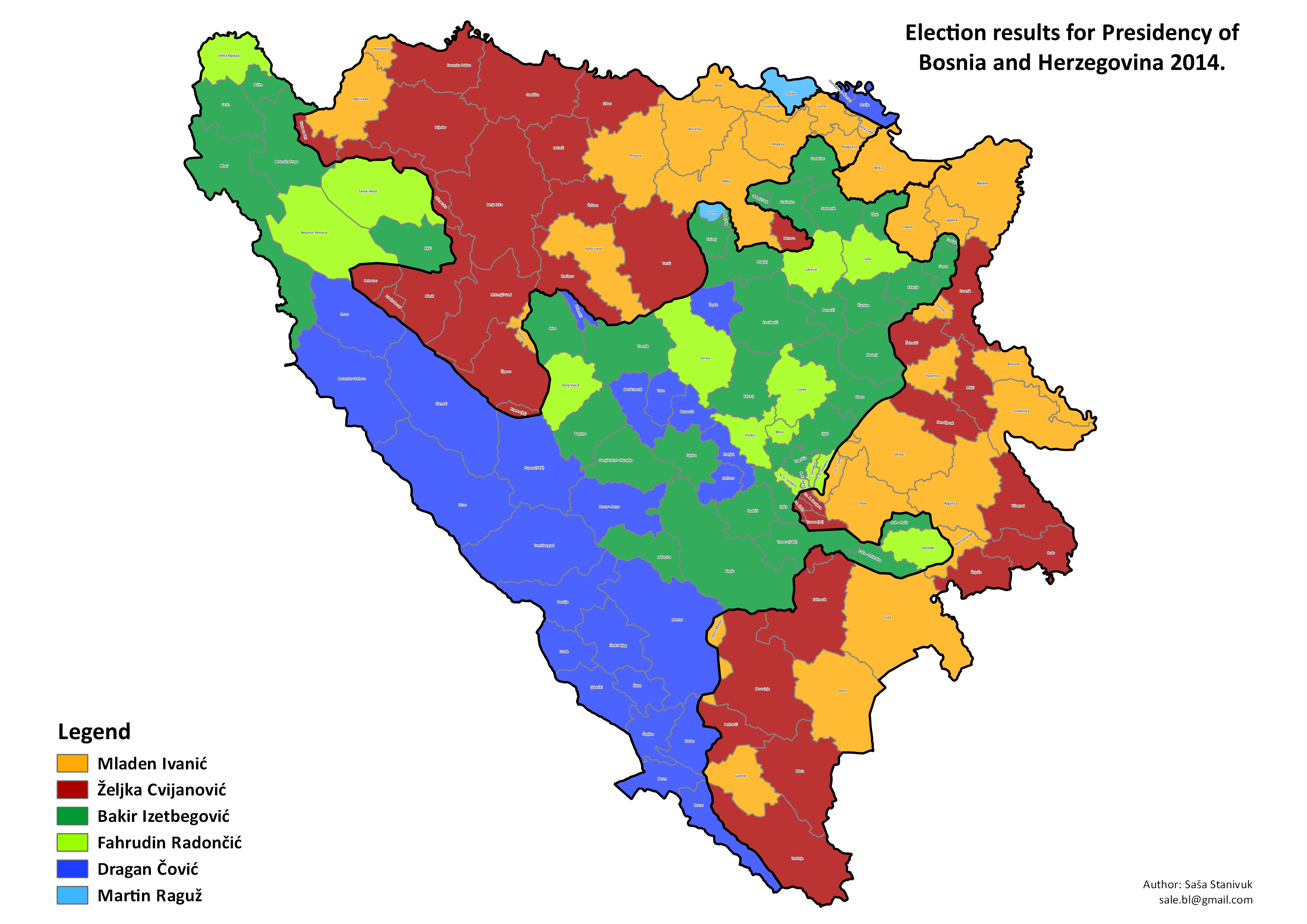
- Results by municipality.
- Serb member of the Presidency
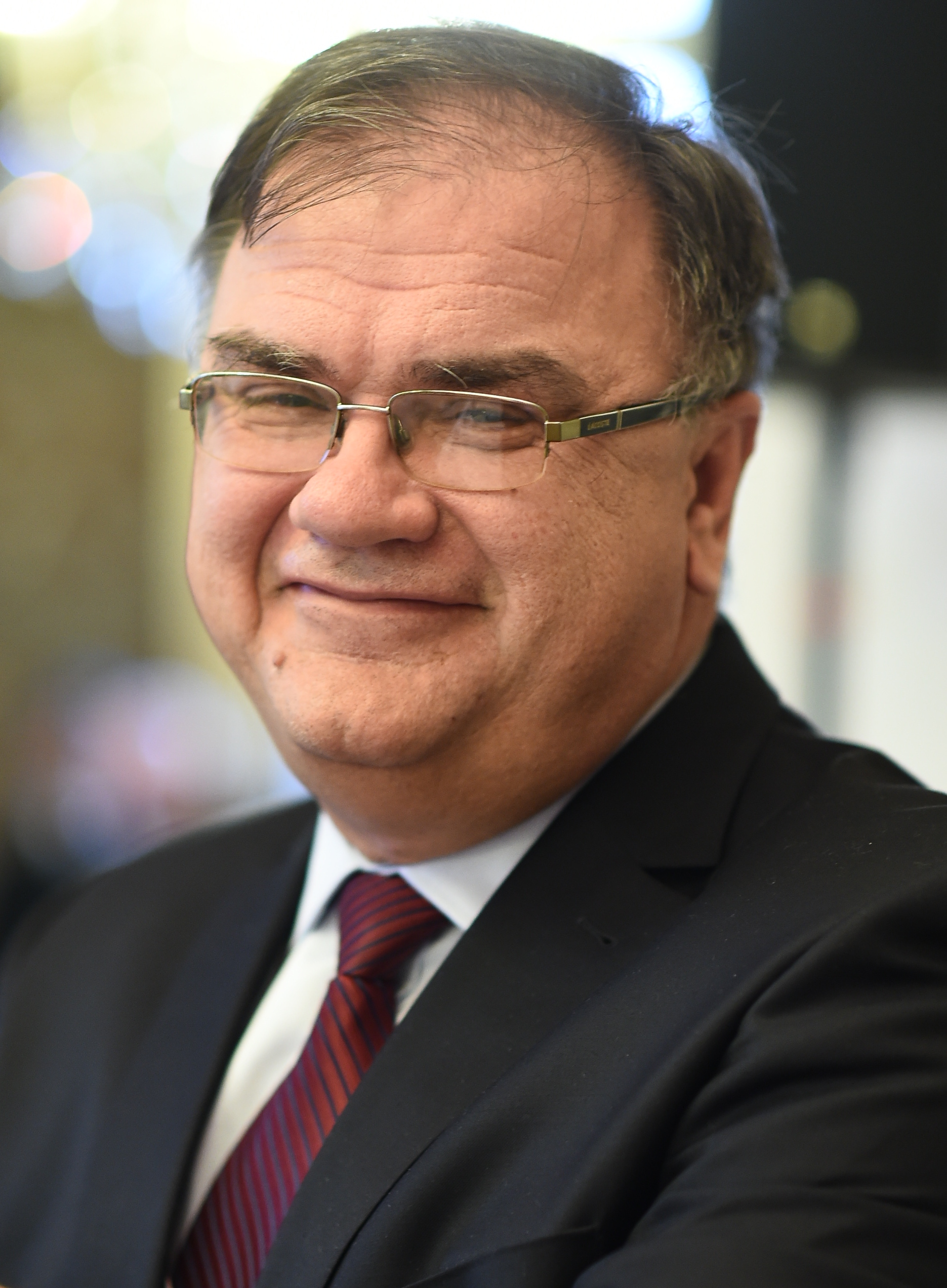

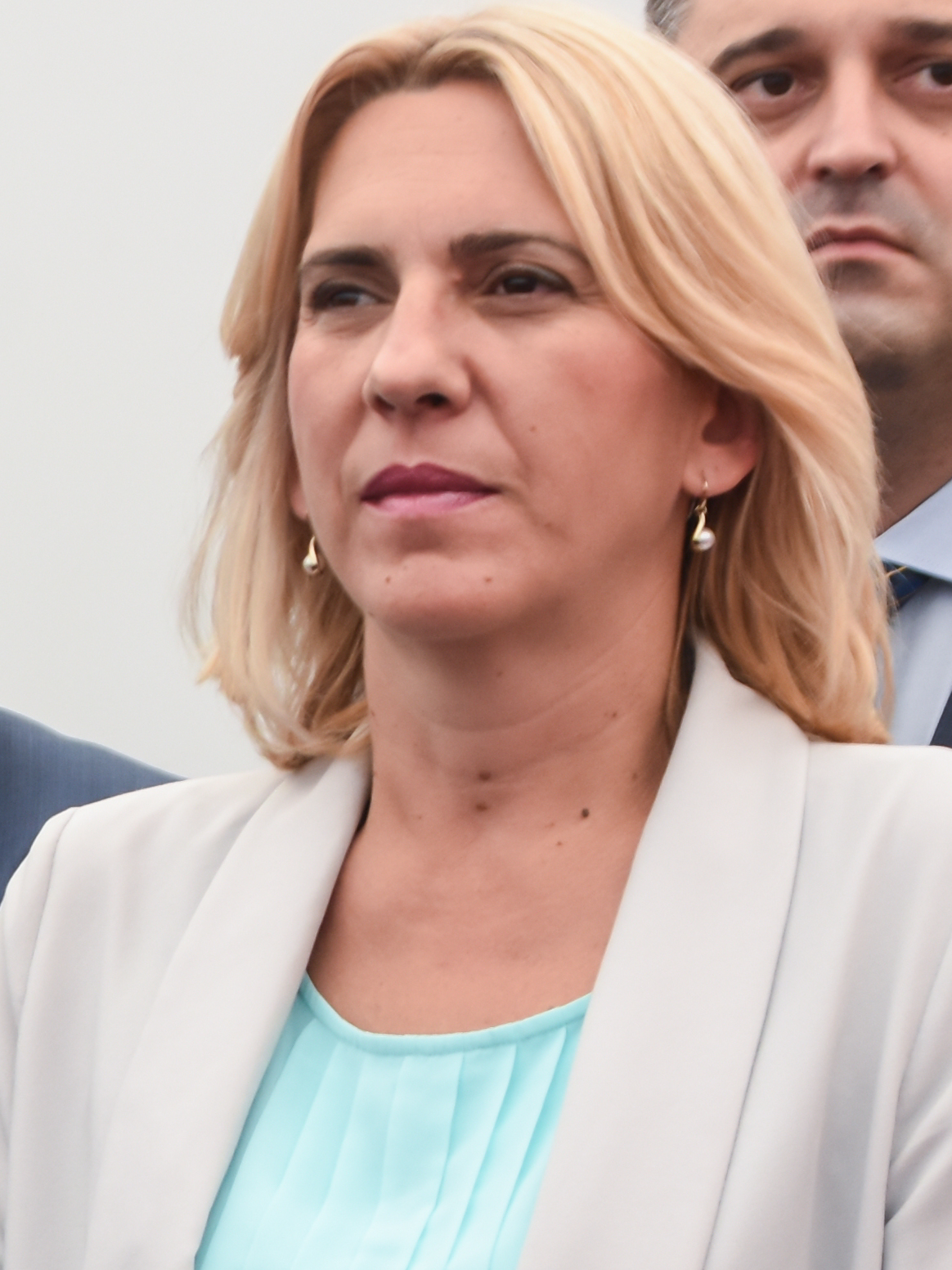
Candidate	Mladen Ivanić	Željka Cvijanović
Party	PDP	SNSD
Popular vote	318,196	310,658
Percentage	48.71%	47.56%
- Results by municipality for the Serb member of the Presidency
Presidency members before election
Bakir Izetbegović (Bosniak)
Željko Komšić (Croat)
Nebojša Radmanović (Serb)
Elected Presidency members
Bakir Izetbegović (Bosniak)
Dragan Čović (Croat)
Mladen Ivanić (Serb)
- House of Representatives
- All 42 seats in the House of Representatives; 22 seats needed for a majority
Party	Leader	Vote %	Seats	+/–
SDA	Bakir Izetbegović	18.73	10	+3
SNSD	Milorad Dodik	15.64	6	−2
SDS	Mladen Bosić	12.97	5	+1
DF	Željko Komšić	9.24	5	New
SBB	Fahrudin Radončić	8.71	4	0
HDZ–HSS–HKDU	Dragan Čović	7.54	4	+1
SDP BiH	Zlatko Lagumdžija	6.65	3	−5
PDP–NDP	Mladen Ivanić	3.10	1	0
HDZ 1990	Martin Raguž	2.46	1	−1
BPS	Sefer Halilović	2.35	1	+1
DNS	Marko Pavić	2.27	1	0
A-SDA	Nermin Ogrešević	1.35	1	New
This lists parties that won seats. See the complete results below.

Chairman before	Chairman after
Vjekoslav Bevanda; HDZ BiH	Denis Zvizdić; SDA

General elections were held in Bosnia and Herzegovina on 12 October 2014. They decided the makeup of Bosnia and Herzegovina's Presidency as well as national, entity, and cantonal governments. Voter turnout was 54.47%.

The elections for the House of Representatives were divided into two; one for the Federation of Bosnia and Herzegovina and one for Republika Srpska. In the presidential election, voters in the Federation re-elected Bosniak Bakir Izetbegović and elected Croat Dragan Čović, while voters in Republika Srpska elected Serb Mladen Ivanić.

The Party of Democratic Action (SDA) emerged as the largest party in the House of Representatives, winning 10 of the 42 seats and over 300,000 votes, their highest number of votes since 1998. The Alliance of Independent Social Democrats came in second with 6 seats, down two from the previous general election. The Serb Democratic Party (SDS) significantly improved its result, earning 12.97% of the popular vote, up from 8.40% in 2010, winning five seats. The newly-formed Democratic Front (DF), headed by Željko Komšić, also won five seats. The Union for a Better Future and the Croatian Democratic Union (HDZ BiH) each won 4 seats. The ruling Social Democratic Party recorded its worst ever result with 6.65% of the popular vote, a drastic decline from 17.33% in the 2010 general election, winning three seats, its lowest number since 1996. The Party for Bosnia and Herzegovina failed to meet the 3% constituency level vote electoral threshold, denying it seats in the House of Representatives for the first time in its history.

Following the election, the SDA and the SDS formed a coalition agreement with the DF, the HDZ BiH and the Party of Democratic Progress. In March 2015, Denis Zvizdić was appointed as the new Chairman of the Council of Ministers and the government was confirmed by the House of Representatives.

== Electoral system ==
The three members of the Presidency are elected by plurality. In Republika Srpska voters elect the Serb representative, whilst in the Federation of Bosnia and Herzegovina voters elect the Bosniak and Croat members.

The 42 members of the House of Representatives are elected by proportional representation in two constituencies, the Federation of Bosnia and Herzegovina and Republika Srpska.

== Results ==
=== Presidency ===
Candidate	Party	Votes	%
Bosniak member
Bakir Izetbegović	Party of Democratic Action	247,235	32.87
Fahrudin Radončić	Union for a Better Future	201,454	26.78
Emir Suljagić	Democratic Front	114,334	15.20
Bakir Hadžiomerović	Social Democratic Party	75,369	10.02
Sefer Halilović	Bosnian-Herzegovinian Patriotic Party	66,230	8.80
Mustafa Cerić	Independent	33,882	4.50
Džebrail Bajramović	Diaspora Party	5,041	0.67
Mirsad Kebo	Independent	3,893	0.52
Halil Tuzlić	Independent	3,162	0.42
Adil Žigić	Independent	1,637	0.22
Total		752,237	100.00
Croat member
Dragan Čović	Croatian Democratic Union	128,053	52.20
Martin Raguž	Croatian Democratic Union 1990	94,695	38.60
Živko Budimir	Party of Justice and Trust	15,368	6.27
Anto Popović	Democratic Front	7,179	2.93
Total		245,295	100.00
Serb member
Mladen Ivanić	SDS–PDP–NDP–SRS RS–PUP	318,196	48.71
Željka Cvijanović	SNSD–DNS–SP	310,658	47.56
Goran Zmijanjac	Fair Policy Party	24,334	3.73
Total		653,188	100.00
Valid votes		1,650,720	92.31
Invalid/blank votes		137,473	7.69
Total votes		1,788,193	100.00
Source: CEC

=== House of Representatives ===
Party	Votes	%	Seats	+/–
Party of Democratic Action	305,394	18.73	10	+3
Alliance of Independent Social Democrats	255,024	15.64	6	–2
Serb Democratic Party	211,562	12.97	5	+1
Democratic Front	150,767	9.24	5	New
Union for a Better Future	142,003	8.71	4	0
HDZ–HSS–HKDU–HSP AS–HSP BA	123,022	7.54	4	–
Social Democratic Party	108,501	6.65	3	–5
PDP–NDP	50,516	3.10	1	0
Croatian Democratic Union 1990	40,113	2.46	1	–1
Bosnian-Herzegovinian Patriotic Party	38,318	2.35	1	+1
Democratic People's Alliance	37,052	2.27	1	0
Party for Bosnia and Herzegovina	25,677	1.57	0	–2
Party of Democratic Activity	22,088	1.35	1	New
Socialist Party	18,729	1.15	0	0
SPP–SDU–DNZ	16,306	1.00	0	–1
People's Party Work for Prosperity	12,927	0.79	0	–1
Serb Progressive Party	11,421	0.70	0	0
Our Party	10,913	0.67	0	0
Party of Justice and Trust	9,762	0.60	0	New
Bosnian Party	7,518	0.46	0	0
Social Democratic Union – Union for Us All	6,734	0.41	0	0
Labour Party	5,731	0.35	0	New
Strong BiH (HSP–DSI)	5,475	0.34	0	–
Communist Party	5,051	0.31	0	New
Croatian Union HKDU–HRAST	4,718	0.29	0	New
Diaspora Party	3,371	0.21	0	New
New Movement	1,830	0.11	0	New
Independents	397	0.02	0	New
Total	1,630,920	100.00	42	0
Valid votes	1,630,920	91.24		
Invalid/blank votes	156,529	8.76		
Total votes	1,787,449	100.00		
Source: CEC

==== By entity ====
Party	Federation			Republika Srpska			Total seats
Party	Votes	%	Seats	Votes	%	Seats	Total seats
Party of Democratic Action	274,057	27.87	9	31,337	4.84	1	10
Alliance of Independent Social Democrats	5,842	0.59	0	249,182	38.48	6	6
Serb Democratic Party				211,562	32.67	5	5
Democratic Front	150,767	15.33	5				5
Union for a Better Future	142,003	14.44	4				4
HDZ–HSS–HKDU–HSP AS–HSP BA	119,468	12.15	4	3,554	0.55	0	4
Social Democratic Party	92,906	9.45	3	15,595	2.41	0	3
PDP–NDP	194	0.02	0	50,322	7.77	1	1
Croatian Democratic Union 1990	40,113	4.08	1				1
Bosnian-Herzegovinian Patriotic Party	35,866	3.65	1	2,452	0.38	0	1
Democratic People's Alliance				37,052	5.72	1	1
Party for Bosnia and Herzegovina	25,677	2.61	0				0
Party of Democratic Activity	22,088	2.25	1				1
Socialist Party				18,729	2.89	0	0
SPP–SDU–DNZ	12,885	1.31	0	3,421	0.53	0	0
People's Party Work for Prosperity	12,927	1.31	0				0
Serb Progressive Party				11,421	1.76	0	0
Our Party	10,913	1.11	0				0
Fair Policy Party				9,762	1.51	0	0
Bosnian Party	7,518	0.76	0				0
Social Democratic Union – Union for Us All	5,881	0.60	0	853	0.13	0	0
Labour Party	5,731	0.58	0				0
Strong BiH (HSP–DSI)	5,475	0.56	0				0
Communist Party	3,075	0.31	0	1,976	0.31	0	0
Croatian Union HKDU–HRAST	4,718	0.48	0				0
Diaspora Party	3,371	0.34	0				0
New Movement	1,830	0.19	0				0
Independents				397	0.06	0	0
Total	983,305	100.00	28	647,615	100.00	14	42
Valid votes	983,305	90.96		647,615	91.68		
Invalid/blank votes	97,720	9.04		58,809	8.32		
Total votes	1,081,025	100.00		706,424	100.00		
Source: CEC

=== By electoral unit ===
==== Federation of Bosnia and Herzegovina ====
Electoral Unit	SDA	DF	SBB	HDZ BiH (Note: In coalition with HSS, HKDU, HSP AS and HSP BA.)	SDP BiH	HDZ 1990	BPS	A-SDA
1st	27.69	10.65	9.42	10.69	9.20	4.78	1.45	11.55
2nd	16.08	5.29	6.07	41.94	5.54	11.97	2.96	–
3rd	26.32	27.66	18.45	0.75	6.78	0.63	4.86	–
4th	30.87	12.73	17.57	13.30	9.55	4.09	3.38	2.89
5th	32.54	14.64	14.29	5.77	14.19	2.56	4.33	–
Total	27.87	15.33	14.44	12.15	9.45	4.08	3.65	2.25
Source: izbori.ba

==== Republika Srpska ====
Electoral Unit	SNSD	SDS	PDP–NDP	DNS	SDA
1st	41.12	26.91	8.91	8.07	4.32
2nd	32.55	39.93	5.81	3.97	5.06
3rd	40.70	34.17	8.05	3.72	5.45
Total	38.48	32.67	7.77	5.72	4.84
Source: izbori.ba

== Aftermath ==
While the Bosniak member Bakir Izetbegović was the only member of the tripartite Presidency to be re-elected, Serb member Mladen Ivanić was chosen as the first one to chair the Presidency. Izetbegović said: "In the next four years, I expect the Presidency to be a strong engine driving this country forward on the path of reform toward reaching our most important goal — to become a rightful member of the union of free and democratic European nations." Ivanić said that "the people in Bosnia and Herzegovina are exhausted and tired of quarrels and confrontations, trapped in a vicious circle of economic crisis, enormous unemployment. They are depressed from a lack of ideas on how this situation could change. This must change." He further added that everyone's interest was served by cooperating with both the United States and Russia.

== See also ==
- 2014 Federation of Bosnia and Herzegovina general election
- 2014 Republika Srpska general election
