= Ivo Lozančić =

Bosnian Croat soldier and politician (1957–2007)

Member of the House of Representatives
- In office 5 October 1996 – 17 November 2007

Personal details
- Born: January 2, 1957 Žepče, PR Bosnia and Herzegovina, FPR Yugoslavia
- Died: 17 November 2007 (aged 50) Zenica, Bosnia and Herzegovina
- Party: New Croatian Initiative (1998–2007)
- Other political affiliations: Croatian Democratic Union of Bosnia and Herzegovina (1990–1998)
- Children: 2

Ivo Lozančić (2 January 1957 – 17 November 2007) was a Bosnian Croat soldier and politician.

Lozančić was born in the Bosnian village Donja Ozimica near Žepče. After the independence of Bosnia and Herzegovina following the Bosnian War, Lozančić became the first president of the Croatian Democratic Union's Municipal Council in Žepče. He later led the defence of the town during the Bosnian War as a commander in the Croatian Defense Council. Within the Croatian Republic of Herzeg-Bosnia, he held the post of assistant to the minister of defence.

Lozančić held high posts in the Croatian Democratic Union and later in the New Croatian Initiative. At one point he was also second-in-command of the united Army of the Federation of Bosnia and Herzegovina.

He was a member of the House of Representatives of the Parliamentary Assembly of Bosnia and Herzegovina and was its Chairman from 3 January to 16 September 1997. From 1999 until 2003, Lozančić was a member of the Croatian Parliament elected from the 11th electoral district (for the diaspora).

He was also a member of the Parliamentary Assembly of the Council of Europe from 2002 to 2003 as a representative and until 2007 as a substitute.

Lozančić died in car accident on 17 November 2007 near Zenica.
