= 3rd electoral unit of the House of Representatives of Bosnia and Herzegovina (Republika Srpska) =

Parliamentary constituency

3rd electoral unit of Republika Srpska
- House of Representatives of Bosnia and Herzegovina constituency
- Electoral unit within Republika Srpska (Bosnia and Herzegovina)

Current constituency
- Created: 2000
- Seats: 3
- Representatives: Radovan Višković (SNSD); Sandra Erkić (SNSD); Darko Babalj (SDS)

The third electoral unit of Republika Srpska is a parliamentary constituency used to elect members to the House of Representatives of Bosnia and Herzegovina since 2000.

== Demographics ==
Ethnicity	Population	%
Bosniaks	57,409	18.0
Croats	1,199	0.4
Serbs	257,261	80.7
Did Not declare	743	0.2
Others	1,701	0.5
Unknown	544	0.2
Total	318,857	

== Representatives ==
Convocation	Representatives		
2000–2002	Abdurahman Malkić (SDA)	Momir Tošić (SDS)	Milоš Jоvаnоvić (SDS)
2002–2006	Elmir Jahić (SDA)	Ljiljana Milićević (SDS)	Milоš Jоvаnоvić (SDS)
2006–2010	Slavko Jovičić (SNSD)	Lazar Prodanović (SNSD)	Savo Erić (SDS)
2010–2014	Boško Tomić (SNSD)	Lazar Prodanović (SNSD)	Darko Babalj (SDS)
2014–2018	Staša Košarac (SNSD)	Lazar Prodanović (SNSD)	Aleksandra Pandurević (SDS)
2018–2022	Staša Košarac (SNSD)	Nenad Nešić (DNS)	Mirko Šarović (SDS)
2022–2026	Radovan Višković (SNSD)	Miroslav Vujičić (SNSD)	Darko Babalj (SDS)
2026-2030	Radovan Višković (SNSD)	Sandra Erkić (SNSD)	Darko Babalj (SDS)

== Election results ==
=== 2026 election ===
Party	Votes	%	Mandates
Alliance of Independent Social Democrats	66,266	44.74	2
Serb Democratic Party	23,214	15.67	1
Safe Srpska Movement and allies	13,711	9.25	0
Democratic People's Alliance	10,646	7.18	0
For Justice and Order	7,871	5.31	0
United Srpska	7,153	4.83	0
Party of Democratic Action	5,346	3.60	0
Socialist Party - Democratic Union	4,841	3.26	0
Socialist Party of Srpska	4,767	3.21	0
People's Front	2,009	1.35	0
Party for Bosnia and Herzegovina	939	0.63	0
People and Justice - Social Democrats	856	0.57	0
The will of the People of Srpska	474	0.32	0

=== 2022 election ===
Party	Votes	Mandates
Alliance of Independent Social Democrats	69898	2
Serb Democratic Party	34182	1
Party of Democratic Action	10988	0
For Justice and Order	10521	0
Democratic People's Alliance	10346	0
United Srpska	8782	0
Democratic Union	8437	0
Party of Democratic Progress	6358	0
Socialist Party	4612	0
Bosnia and Herzegovina Greens	403	0
Social Democrats	291	0
Party of Life	241	0
Bosnia and Herzegovina Initiative	210	0
Union for a Better Future of BiH	202	0
Re-Balance	90	0
Circle	62	0
Union for New Politics	55	0
The Left Wing	51	0
SMS	50	0
HDZ 1990	35	0

=== 2018 election ===
Party	Votes	%	Mandates
Alliance of Independent Social Democrats	72970	41.11	1
Serb Democratic Party	47813	26.94	1
Democratic People's Alliance	24867	14.01	1
Party of Democratic Progress	10937	6.16	0
Party of Democratic Action	9686	5.46	0
Socialist Party	6388	3.6	0
Social Democratic Party	1810	1.02	0
First Serb Democratic Party	1618	0.91	0
Advanced Serb Party	604	0.34	0
Union for New Politics	476	0.27	0
Party of Democratic Activity	186	0.1	0
Lijevo Krilo	132	0.07	0

=== 2010 election ===
Party	Votes	%	Mandates
Alliance of Independent Social Democrats	66962	41.40	2
Serb Democratic Party	42224	26.10	1
Progressive Democratic Party	10291	6.36	0
Party of Democratic Action	6374	3.94	0
Democratic People's Alliance	5845	3.61	0
SRS -DR VOJISLAV ŠEŠELJ BIJELJINA	5502	3.40	0
Serb Radical Party	3801	2.35	0
Party for Bosnia and Herzegovina	3605	2.23	0
Socialist Party	2978	1.84	0
Democratic Party- Drаgаn Čаvić	2932	1.81	0
New Socialist Party	2201	1.36	0
Advanced Serb Party	2198	1.36	0
Social Democratic Party	2118	1.31	0
Democratic Serb Alliance	1959	1.21	0
SBB BiH	1279	0.79	0
National Democratic Party	427	0.26	0
Patriotic Party	363	0.22	0
SKOK	237	0.15	0
Party of Democratic Activity	146	0.09	0
Bosnian Party	114	0.07	0
Tоmić Milоš (Independent)	57	0.04	0
Invalid Democratic Party	47	0.03	0
GDS BiH- NEP BiH	38	0.02	0
Social Democratic Union	37	0.02	0
Liberal Democratic Party	15	0.01	0
Total valid	161750	100	

=== 2006 election ===
Party	Votes	%	Mandates
Alliance of Independent Social Democrats	64991	43.72	2
Serb Democratic Party	30407	20.45	1
Party of Democratic Action	9794	6.59	0
Democratic People's Alliance	8262	5.56	0
Progressive Democratic Party	695	4.67	0
Party for Bosnia and Herzegovina	5691	3.83	0
SRS -DR VOJISLAV ŠEŠELJ BIJELJINA	4212	2.83	0
Pensioners' Party- DNS	3784	2.55	0
Socialist Party	3499	2.35	0
Serbian Radical Party	3289	2.21	0
Serb Democratic Movement	2984	2.01	0
Social Democratic Party	1578	1.06	0
New Serbian Force	875	0.59	0
People's Party for Work and Betterment	830	0.56	0
DSS- Serb Democratic Party	793	0.53	0
Bosnian Patriotic Block	162	0.11	0
European Ecological Party	160	0.11	0
Youth Political Movement	137	0.09	0
Justice and Morals	120	0.08	0
Civil Democratic Party	73	0.05	0
Bosansko Podrinjska Narodna Stranka	73	0.05	0
Total valid	142409	100	

=== 2002 election ===
Party	Votes	Mandates
Serb Democratic Party	54752	2
Party of Democratic Action	24701	1

=== 2000 election ===
Party	Votes	Mandates
Serb Democratic Party	85376	2
Party of Democratic Action	27950	1
