= Marinko Čavara =

Bosnian Croat politician (born 1967)

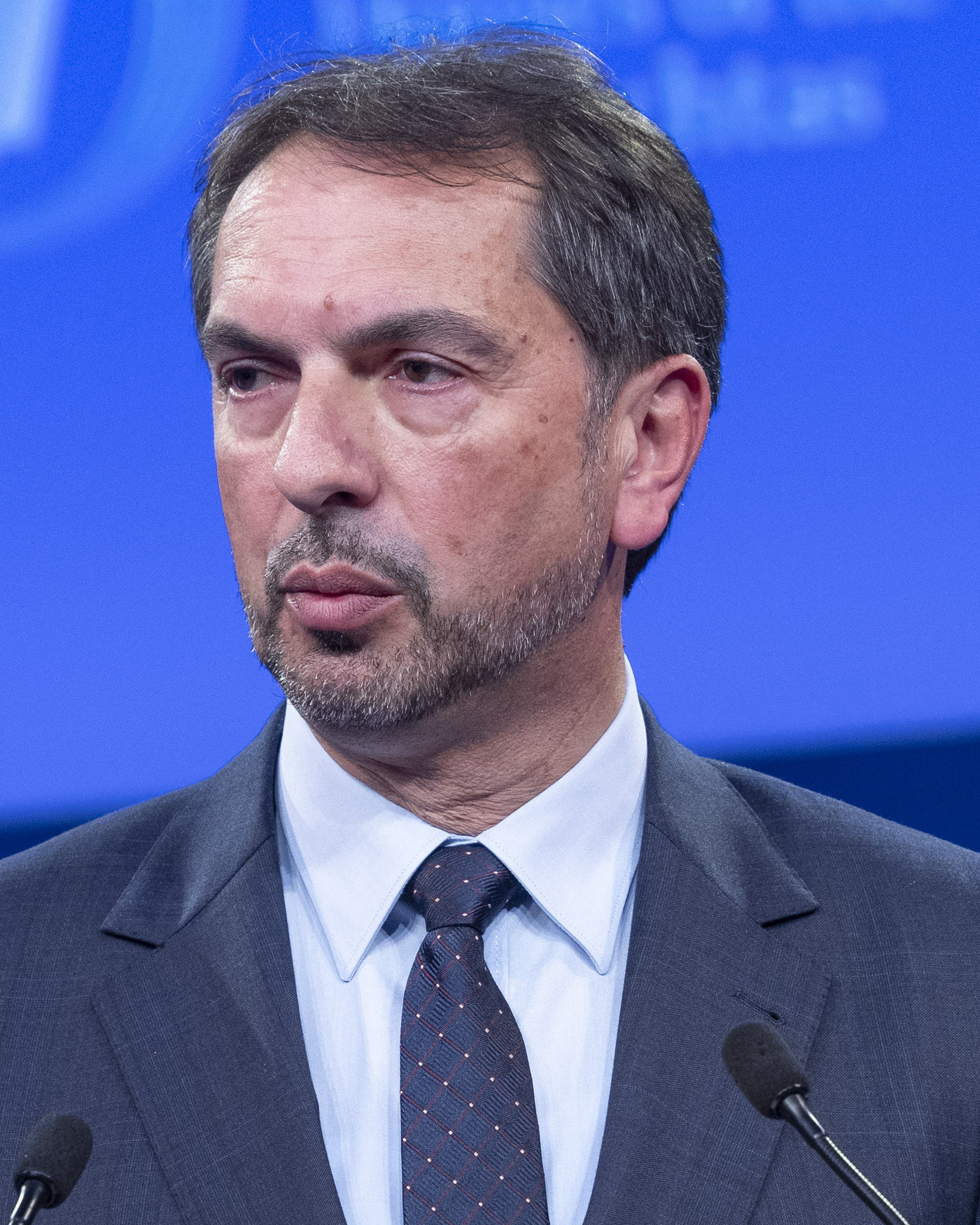
- Čavara in 2023

10th President of the Federation of Bosnia and Herzegovina
- In office 9 February 2015 – 28 February 2023
- Prime Minister: Nermin Nikšić; Fadil Novalić
- Vice President: Melika Mahmutbegović; Milan Dunović
- Preceded by: Živko Budimir
- Succeeded by: Lidija Bradara

Member of the House of Representatives
- Incumbent
- Assumed office 1 December 2022
- Constituency: 4th Electoral Unit of the FBiH
Parliamentary offices
Member of the Federal House of Representatives
In office
6 November 2006 – 2 December 2014
Member of the Federal House of Peoples
In office
May 2006 – 22 February 2007

Personal details
- Born: 2 February 1967 (age 59) Busovača, SR Bosnia and Herzegovina, SFR Yugoslavia
- Party: Croatian Democratic Union
- Spouse: Ivanka Čavara
- Children: 3
- Education: University of Zenica

Marinko Čavara (born 2 February 1967) is a Bosnian Croat politician serving as member of the national House of Representatives since 2022. He previously served as the 10th president of the Federation of Bosnia and Herzegovina from 2015 to 2023.

Čavara was a member of both the Federal House of Peoples and Federal House of Representatives as well. He is a member of the Croatian Democratic Union.

== Early life ==
Marinko Čavara was born in Busovača to Niko and Anđa Čavara on 2 February 1967. He attended elementary school in Busovača, graduating in 1981. He continued his education in engineering high school in Busovača and graduated in 1985. He then attended the University of Zenica in the Faculty of Engineering. He graduated in 1991.

In 1991, he worked as a professor of engineering and physics in a high school in Busovača. In 1992, he became the director of the Busovača post. During the Bosnian War, Čavara was municipal commissioner for war production and workers involved in war production in central Bosnia and head of the municipal Civil Protection.

== Political career ==
In 1990, Čavara joined the Croatian Democratic Union (HDZ BiH). Between 1994 and 1995, he was Vice-President of the HDZ BiH. In 2002, he was once again named Vice-President and President of HDZ BiH in Busovača.

In 1997, Čavara was elected to the Busovača Municipal Council. At the 2000 parliamentary election, he was elected to the Assembly of the Central Bosnia Canton. In the election held two years later, he saved his position in the Assembly.

As of 1996, he worked as Deputy Minister for Traffic and Connection in the Central Bosnia Canton. In 2001, his ministry was dismissed and Čavara was named Deputy Director of the Cantonal Directorate for Roads and was later named Director. He worked in this office until 2005.

Between 2005 and 2006 he was an advisor to Ivo Miro Jović, who was, at the time, the Croat member of the Presidency of Bosnia and Herzegovina. From May 2006 until February 2007, he was a member of the Federal House of Peoples. At the 2006 general election, Čavara won a seat in the Federal House of Representatives and was named its Vice-President.

=== President of the Federation of Bosnia and Herzegovina (2015–2023) ===
Following the 2014 general election, Čavara was appointed as president of the Federation of Bosnia and Herzegovina, one of the two autonomous entities that compose Bosnia and Herzegovina, taking office on 9 February 2015. Since 2019, he has refused to appoint judges to the Federal Constitutional Court, impairing its functionality, as the Court does not have enough judges to run its panel on vital national interests. This issue has been included also in the yearly reports by the European Commission.

On 28 February 2023, Čavara was succeeded by Lidija Bradara as president of the Federation of Bosnia and Herzegovina.

==== Sanctions ====
On 6 June 2022, Čavara was added by the United States Department of the Treasury to the Specially Designated Nationals and Blocked Persons List of individuals whose assets are blocked and U.S. persons are generally prohibited from dealing with them. Čavara was designated under Executive Order 14033, which targets persons who threaten the stability of the Western Balkans region through corruption, criminal activity, and other destabilizing behavior. The designation states that:

"Čavara’s refusal to nominate judges to fill vacancies in the Federal Constitutional Court has blocked the function of the Court’s Vital National Interest panel, a body of the Federal Constitutional Court judges created by 2002 amendments to the Federal Constitution by the High Representative for Bosnia and Herzegovina that is intended to address key issues raised by delegates in the Federal House of Peoples. This has prevented key reforms and hindered democratic processes or institutions. Such failures in governance impact the well-being, prosperity, and rights of citizens across the Federation of Bosnia and Herzegovina."

== Personal life ==
Marinko is married to Ivanka Čavara, and together they have three children, one daughter, and two sons.
