= Melika Mahmutbegović =

Chairwoman of the Council of Ministers of Bosnia and Herzegovina since 2023

Personal details
- Born: 20 April 1959 (age 67) Bugojno, PR Bosnia and Herzegovina, FPR Yugoslavia
- Party: Party of Democratic Action
- Children: 1
- Education: University of Sarajevo (MD, MM)

Melika Mahmutbegović (born 20 April 1959) is a Bosnian politician and surgeon. She currently serves as a member of the Federal House of Representatives of Bosnia and Herzegovina, a position she previously held from 2002 to 2006 and from 2010 to 2014, before being re-elected in the 2018 election.

From 2015 to 2023, she served as the Vice-President of the Federation of Bosnia and Herzegovina. Her political career also includes serving as a member of the national House of Representatives (2010–2014) and the Assembly of the Central Bosnia Canton (1998–2002). A long-standing member of the Party of Democratic Action (SDA), she has served as one of the party's vice presidents since 2019.

Before entering politics, Mahmutbegović pursued a medical career in Bugojno, working as a family physician starting in 1983 and as a surgeon beginning in 1992. She has served as the director of the Bugojno Medical Center since 1995.

== Early life and education ==
Born in Bugojno in 1959, Mahmutbegović graduated from the Faculty of Medicine at the University of Sarajevo in 1983. During the Bosnian War, she served in the Army of the Republic of Bosnia and Herzegovina as a war hospital surgeon starting in April 1992.

== Personal life ==
Mahmutbegović has a daughter, Neira Golić, who is a pharmacist.
