= Šemsudin Dedić =

Bosnian politician of the Party of Democratic Action

Šemsudin Dedić (born 5 October 1973) is a Bosnian politician of the Party of Democratic Action (SDA). He has served as a member of the national House of Representatives since 2018.

Dedić previously served as Minister of Finance of the Una-Sana Canton (2005–2007), Prime Minister of Una-Sana Canton (2007–2011), member of the House of Representatives of the Federation of Bosnia and Herzegovina (2011–2014), and Federal Minister of Agriculture, Water Management and Forestry (2015–2023).

== Biography ==
Born in Bihać in 1973, Dedić completed his primary and secondary education in his hometown and earned a bachelor's degree from the University of Tuzla's Faculty of Economics in 2000. He obtained a master's degree in financial management from the University of Sarajevo's Faculty of Economics in 2010.

He began his career in 2001 as an associate for investigations in the Customs Administration of the Federation of Bosnia and Herzegovina until 2004, before working as an associate in the internal audit department of the Indirect Taxation Authority of Bosnia and Herzegovina (UIOBiH) in Banja Luka until 2005.

Dedić entered politics in the Government of the Una-Sana Canton, serving as Minister of Finance from 2005 to 2007 and as Prime Minister from 2007 to 2011. He then moved to the federal level as a member of the House of Representatives of the Federation of Bosnia and Herzegovina from 2011 to 2014. In 2015, he was appointed Federal Minister of Agriculture, Water Management and Forestry, holding the position until May 2023. He was elected to the national House of Representatives in the 2018, 2022 and the 2026 general elections. While simultaneously serving as both a member of the House of Representatives and Federal Minister during his 2018–2022 mandate, he proposed only two initiatives and asked four parliamentary questions.

Dedić is married to Amra Dedić, with whom he has two children.
