= Milan Dunović =

Bosnian politician

Milan Dunović is a Bosnian Serb politician. He is a former Vice President of the Federation of Bosnia and Herzegovina from 2015 to 2023.

Dunović was born on 22 July 1974 in Sarajevo. He graduated from the University of Sarajevo. During the Bosnian War, he actively participated in the defense of Sarajevo and Bosnia and Herzegovina. After the war, he worked in BH Pošta.

In 2013, he became a member of the Democratic Front party. In February 2015, he was appointed to the position of Vice President of the Federation of Bosnia and Herzegovina as Serb representative. He was Vice President of the Federation of Bosnia and Herzegovina from February 2015 to February 2023. He is a current member of House of Representatives.

In 2017, he signed the Declaration on the Common Language of the Croats, Serbs, Bosniaks and Montenegrins.
