= Latasi =

Latasi is a surname of Tuvaluan origin. People with the surname include:

- Kamuta Latasi (born 1936), Tuvaluan politician
- Naama Maheu Latasi (died 2012), Tuvaluan politician
- Pepetua Latasi, Tuvaluan civil servant
- Tuafafa Latasi, Tuvaluan politician

== See also ==
- Latas
