= Albin Muslić =

Bosnian politician of the Social Democratic Party

Albin Muslić (born 27 July 1982) is a Bosnian politician of the Social Democratic Party. He has served as a member of the national House of Representatives since 2022.

== Biography ==
Born in Bihać in 1982, Muslić earned a Bachelor of Laws from the University of Bihać in 2005, followed by a Mater of Laws in 2010 and a Doctor of Laws in 2014. He worked as an associate professor at the University of Bihać's Faculty of Law from 2013 to 2018.

Muslić entered politics as a member of the Assembly of the Una-Sana Canton, serving from 2006 to 2011. In 2011, he was elected Mayor of Bihać in a snap election followed by the resignation of Hamdija Lipovača, who stepped down to become Prime Minister of the Una-Sana Canton. Muslić held the mayoral office until 2012.

He was elected to the House of Representatives of the Federation of Bosnia and Herzegovina in the 2018 election. Four years later, in the 2022 election, he won a seat in the national House of Representatives, and was re-elected in the 2026 election.

In addition to his native Bosnian, Muslić also speaks English and German.
