= Bosnian-Herzegovinian Patriotic Party =

Bosnian-Herzegovinian Patriotic Party Bosanskohercegovačka patriotska stranka
- Leader: Sefer Halilović
- Founded: 6 June 1996
- Headquarters: Husrefa Redžića 4, 71000 Sarajevo
- Ideology: Conservatism; Bosniak nationalism
- Political position: Centre-right
- HoR BiH: 0 / 42
- HoP BiH: 0 / 15
- HoR FBiH: 0 / 98
- HoP FBiH: 0 / 80
- NA RS: 0 / 83

Party flag

The Bosnian-Herzegovinian Patriotic Party (Bosnian: Bosanskohercegovačka patriotska stranka, BPS) is a Bosnian nationalist political party in Bosnia and Herzegovina. It was founded on 6 June 1996 by the former commander of the Army of the Republic of Bosnia and Herzegovina, Sefer Halilović.

In 1998 it became a party involved in the Parliament of the Federation of Bosnia and Herzegovina.

== List of presidents ==
#	Name (Born–Died)	Portrait	Term of Office	
1	Sefer Halilović (b. 1952)		1996	present

== Elections ==
=== Parliamentary elections ===
House of Representatives of Bosnia and Herzegovina
Election	Votes	%	Seats	+/–	Rank	Government
1996	3,295	0.14	0 / 42	New	20th	Extra-parliamentary
1998	11,726	0.68	0 / 42	0	15th	Extra-parliamentary
2000	17,248	1.16	1 / 42	▲1	13th	Support
2002	10,585	0.86	0 / 42	▼1	16th	Extra-parliamentary
2006	38,474	2.72	1 / 42	▲1	8th	Opposition
2010	28,704	1.75	0 / 42	▼1	12th	Extra-parliamentary
2014	38,318	2.35	1 / 42	▲1	10th	Opposition
2018	16,433	0.99	0 / 42	▼1	18th	Extra-parliamentary
2022	158	0.01	0 / 42	0	18th	Extra-parliamentary

=== Presidency elections ===
Presidency of Bosnia and Herzegovina
Election year	#	Candidate	Votes	%	Representing	Elected?
1998	3rd	Sefer Halilović	33,687	5.72%	Bosniaks	No
2002	6th	Emir Zlatar	6,500	1.26%	Bosniaks	No
2010	5th	Mujo Demirović	8,951	1.92%	Bosniaks	No
2014	5th	Sefer Halilović	66,230	8.80%	Bosniaks	No
