= 2018 Bosnian general election =

- 7 October 2018
- Turnout: 54.02% (presidential) ▼0.45 pp 54.03% (parliamentary) ▼0.44 pp
- Bosniak member of the Presidency
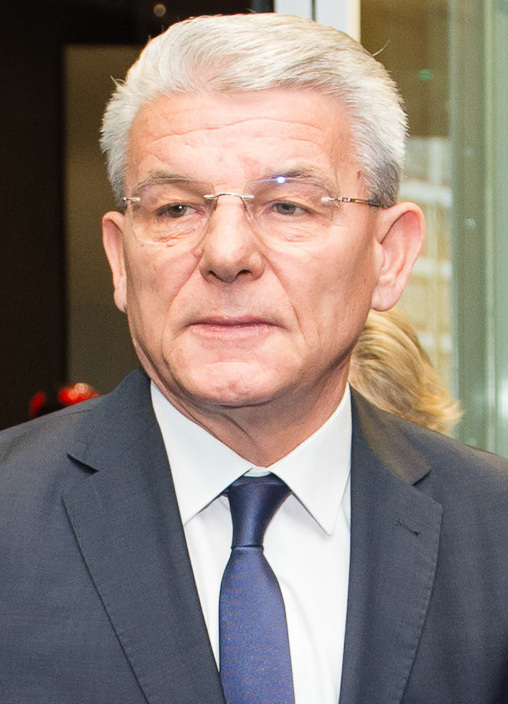

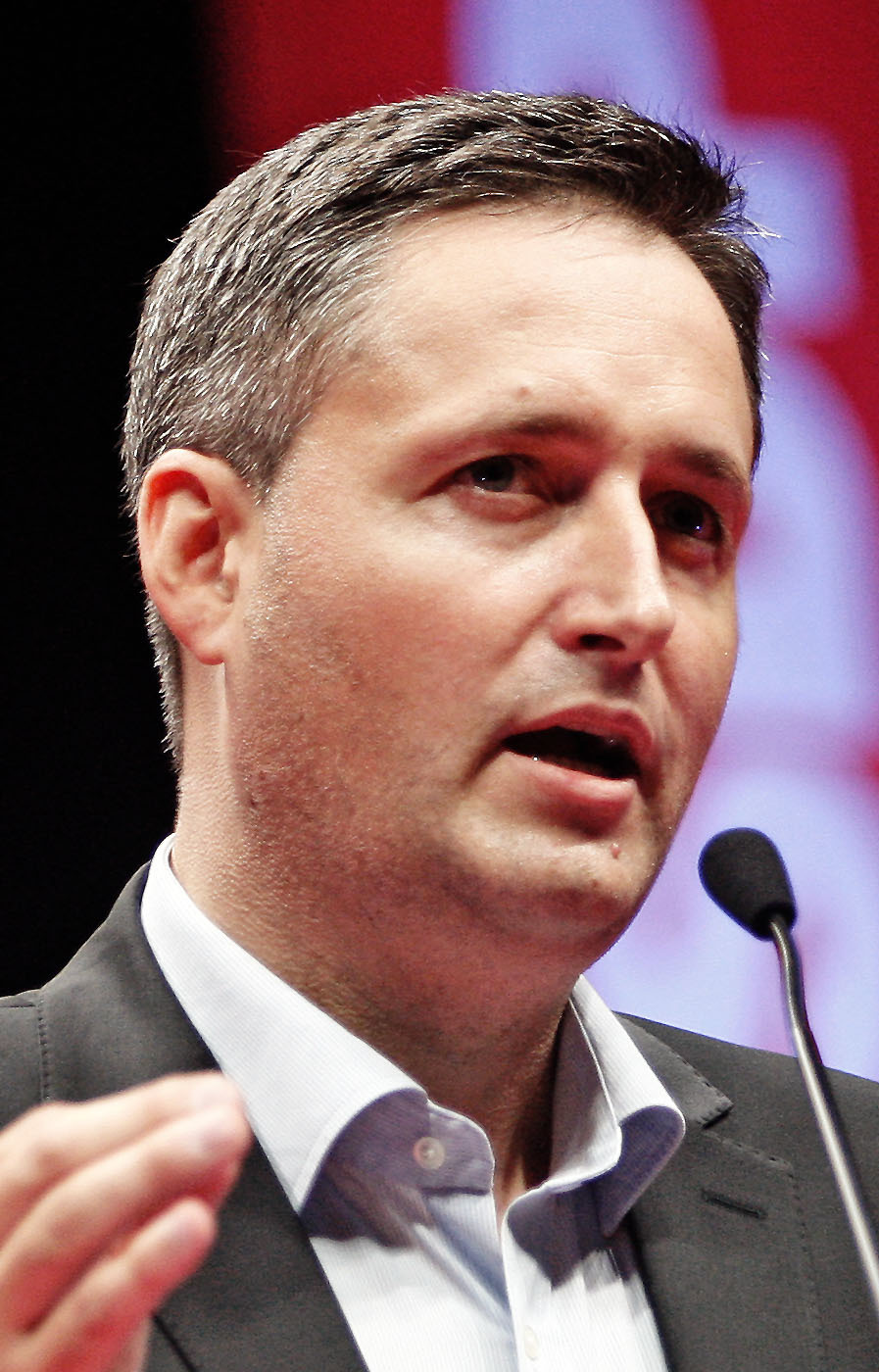
| Candidate | Šefik Džaferović | Denis Bećirović |
| Party | SDA | SDP BiH |
| Popular vote | 212,581 | 194,688 |
| Percentage | 36.61% | 33.53% |
- Results by municipality for the Bosniak member of the Presidency
- Croat member of the Presidency
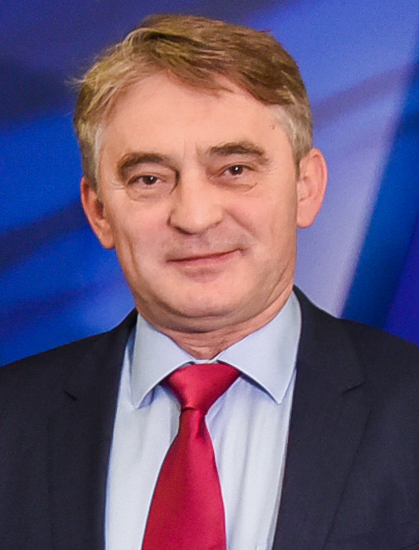

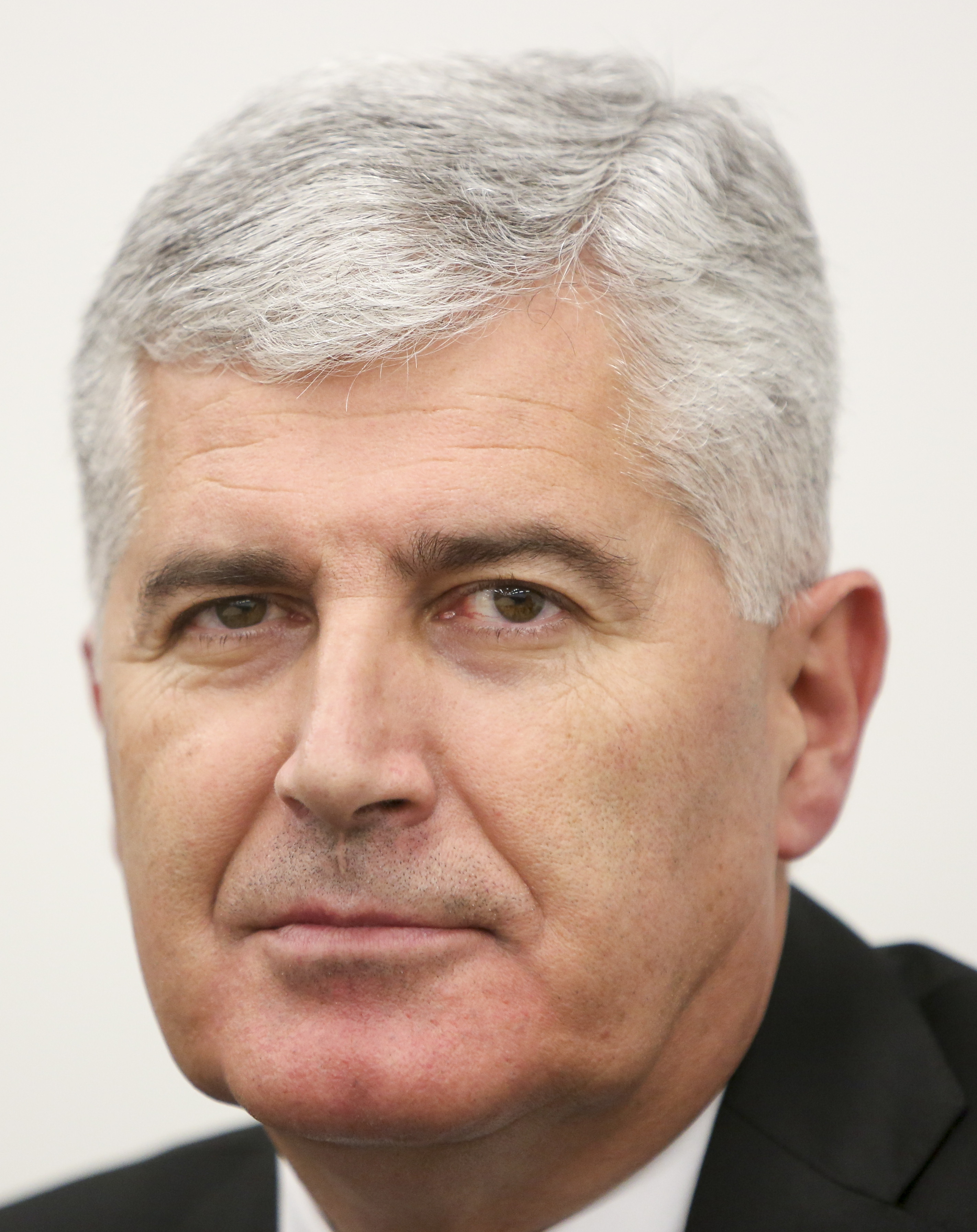
| Candidate | Željko Komšić | Dragan Čović |
| Party | DF | HDZ BiH |
| Popular vote | 225,500 | 154,819 |
| Percentage | 52.64% | 36.14% |
- Results by municipality for the Croat member of the Presidency
- Serb member of the Presidency
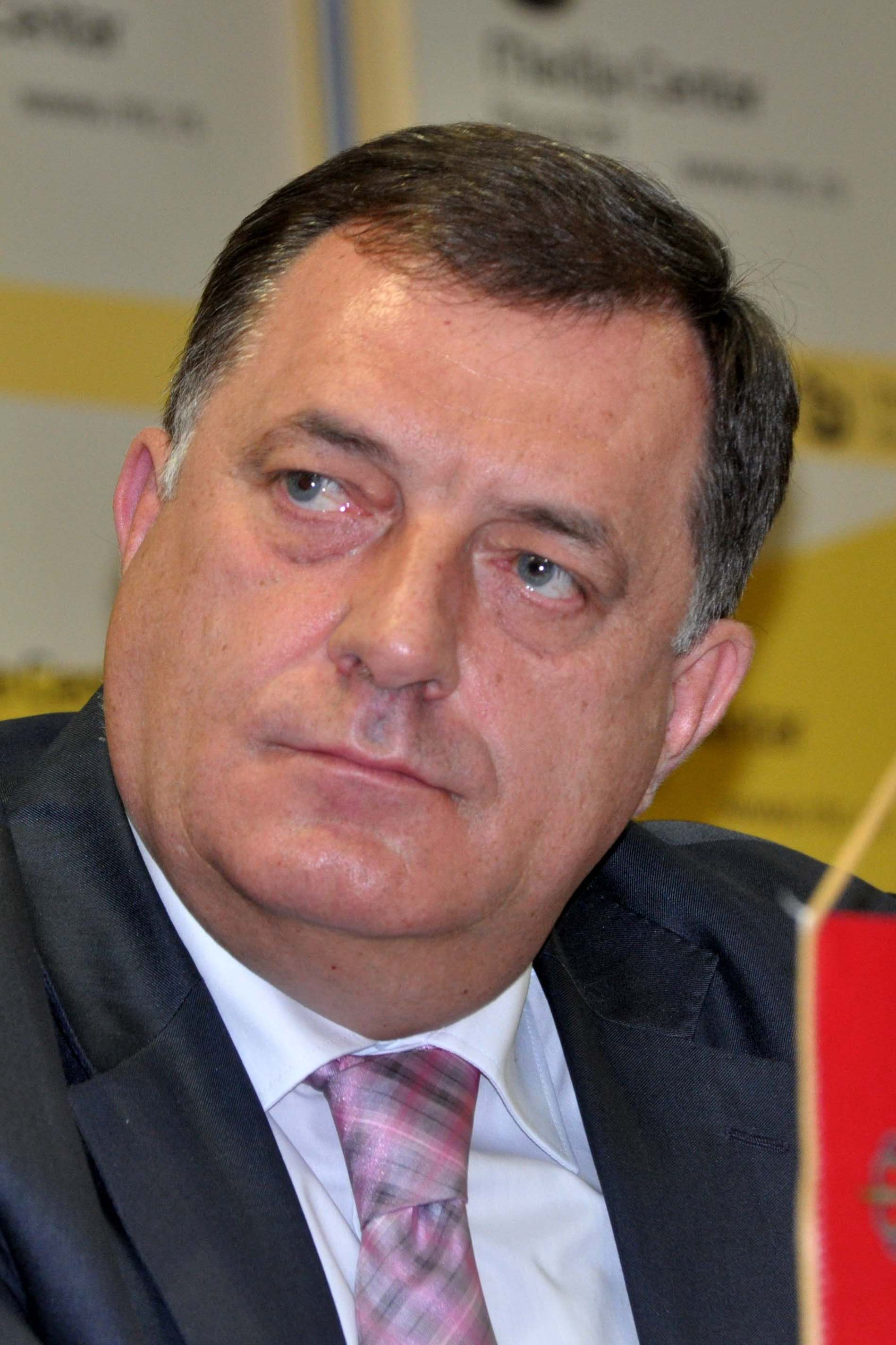

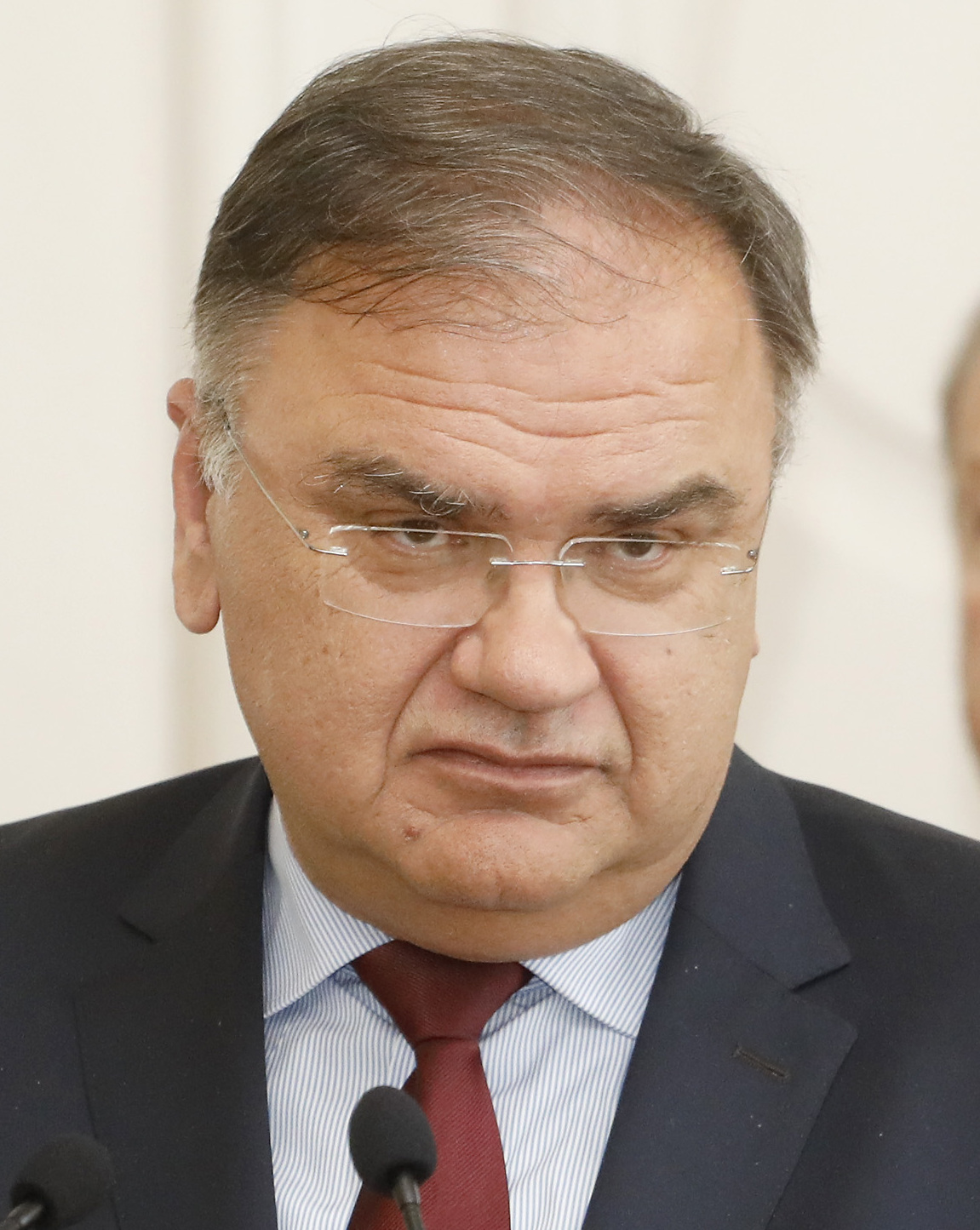
| Candidate | Milorad Dodik | Mladen Ivanić |
| Party | SNSD | PDP |
| Popular vote | 368,210 | 292,065 |
| Percentage | 53.88% | 42.74% |
- Results by municipality for the Serb member of the Presidency
Presidency members before election
Bakir Izetbegović (Bosniak)
Dragan Čović (Croat)
Mladen Ivanić (Serb)
Elected Presidency members
Šefik Džaferović (Bosniak)
Željko Komšić (Croat)
Milorad Dodik (Serb)
- House of Representatives
- All 42 seats in the House of Representatives; 22 seats needed for a majority
| Party | Leader | Vote % | Seats | +/– |
|---|---|---|---|---|
| SDA | Bakir Izetbegović | 17.01 | 9 | −1 |
| SNSD | Milorad Dodik | 16.03 | 6 | 0 |
| SDS–NDP–NS–SRS | Vukota Govedarica | 9.80 | 3 | −2 |
| SDP BiH | Nermin Nikšić | 9.08 | 5 | +2 |
| HDZ–HSS–HSP–HKDU | Dragan Čović | 9.05 | 5 | +1 |
| DF–GS | Željko Komšić | 5.81 | 3 | −2 |
| PDP | Branislav Borenović | 5.06 | 2 | +1 |
| DNS | Marko Pavić | 4.18 | 1 | 0 |
| SBB | Fahrudin Radončić | 4.16 | 2 | −2 |
| NS | Predrag Kojović | 2.92 | 2 | +2 |
| NB | Senad Šepić | 2.51 | 1 | New |
| PDA | Mirsad Kukić | 2.32 | 1 | New |
| SP | Petar Đokić | 1.89 | 1 | +1 |
| A-SDA | Nermin Ogrešević | 1.84 | 1 | 0 |
This lists parties that won seats. See the complete results below.

| Chairman before | Chairman after |
|---|---|
| Denis Zvizdić; SDA | Zoran Tegeltija; SNSD |

General elections were held in Bosnia and Herzegovina on 7 October 2018. They decided the makeup of the presidency as well as national, entity and cantonal governments. Voter turnout was 54%.

The elections for the House of Representatives were divided into two; one for the Federation of Bosnia and Herzegovina and one for Republika Srpska. In the presidential election, voters in the Federation elected Bosniak Šefik Džaferović and Croat Željko Komšić, while voters in Republika Srpska elected Serb Milorad Dodik.

The Party of Democratic Action (SDA) emerged as the largest party in the House of Representatives, winning 9 of the 42 seats. The Alliance of Independent Social Democrats (SNSD) came in second with 6 seats, while the Social Democratic Party won 5 seats, up two from the previous general election in 2014; the Croatian Democratic Union (HDZ BiH) also ended up with 5 seats. The Serb Democratic Party and the Democratic Front (DF) each won three seats. The election also saw a significant decline of the Union for a Better Future, going from 8.71% of the popular vote down to 4.16%, enough for two seats.

After a one year governmental formation crisis following the election, in December 2019, a coalition led by the SDA, the SNSD and the HDZ BiH, which also included the DF and the Democratic People's Alliance, formed a new government headed by the SNSD's Zoran Tegeltija.

== Electoral system ==
The three members of the Presidency are elected by plurality. In Republika Srpska voters elect the Serb representative, whilst in the Federation of Bosnia and Herzegovina voters elect the Bosniak and Croat members. Voters registered in the Federation of Bosnia and Herzegovina can vote for either the Bosniak or Croat candidate, but cannot vote in both elections.

The 42 members of the House of Representatives are elected by open list proportional representation in two constituencies, the Federation of Bosnia and Herzegovina and Republika Srpska. These two constituencies are subsequently divided in eight electoral units.

A total of 3,352,933 citizens were registered to vote; 2,092,336 in the Federation and 1,260,597 in Republika Srpska (citizens living in Brčko District voted in one of the entities). There were 77,814 persons registered to vote outside of Bosnia and Herzegovina, out of which 76,729 persons were registered to vote by mail and 1,085 were registered to vote at diplomatic missions.

== Results ==
Turnout at the level of Bosnia and Herzegovina was 53.36%; the Federation 51.25%; Republika Srpska 57.30% and Brčko District 46.81%. The percentage was slightly lower as compared to 2014 that was 54.14%. The Bosnian Central Election Commission (CEC) reported that all 5,714 polling stations closed down in time or with slight delay. According to the initial assessment by the CEC, the elections passed in an overall calm and peaceful atmosphere.

=== Presidency ===
The elected members of the national Presidency were Šefik Džaferović (Bosniak, SDA), Željko Komšić (Croat, DF) and Milorad Dodik (Serb, SNSD). There was controversy over the election of the Croat member, as the non-nationalist candidate Željko Komšić (Democratic Front) won against the nationalist Dragan Čović (HDZ BiH) with the help of Bosniak voters, with Komšić winning first place almost exclusively in municipalities without a Croat relative majority. The result prompted protests of Croats accusing Bosniaks of out-voting and calling for the creation of their own entity or electoral constituency. In the following days, protests were held in Mostar with signs "Not my president". In the days following election, several municipalities with Croat majority declared Komšić persona non grata.

| Candidate | Party | Votes | % |
Bosniak member
| Šefik Džaferović | Party of Democratic Action | 212,581 | 36.61 |
| Denis Bećirović | Social Democratic Party | 194,688 | 33.53 |
| Fahrudin Radončić | Union for a Better Future | 75,210 | 12.95 |
| Mirsad Hadžikadić | Platform for Progress | 58,555 | 10.09 |
| Senad Šepić | Independent Bloc | 29,922 | 5.15 |
| Amer Jerlagić | Party for Bosnia and Herzegovina | 9,655 | 1.66 |
| Total | | 580,611 | 100.00 |
Croat member
| Željko Komšić | Democratic Front | 225,500 | 52.64 |
| Dragan Čović | Croatian Democratic Union | 154,819 | 36.14 |
| Diana Zelenika | Croatian Democratic Union 1990 | 25,890 | 6.04 |
| Boriša Falatar | Our Party | 16,036 | 3.74 |
| Jerko Ivanković Lijanović | People's Party Work for Prosperity | 6,099 | 1.42 |
| Total | | 428,344 | 100.00 |
Serb member
| Milorad Dodik | Alliance of Independent Social Democrats | 368,210 | 53.88 |
| Mladen Ivanić | Alliance for Victory (SDS–PDP–NDP–SRS RS–SRS VS) | 292,065 | 42.74 |
| Mirjana Popović | Serb Progressive Party | 12,731 | 1.86 |
| Gojko Kličković | First Serb Democratic Party | 10,355 | 1.52 |
| Total | | 683,361 | 100.00 |
| Valid votes | | 1,692,316 | 93.37 |
| Invalid/blank votes | | 120,259 | 6.63 |
| Total votes | | 1,812,575 | 100.00 |
| Registered voters/turnout | | 3,355,429 | 54.02 |
Source: CEC

=== House of Representatives ===
| Party | Votes | % | Seats | +/– |
|---|---|---|---|---|
| Party of Democratic Action | 281,731 | 17.01 | 9 | –1 |
| Alliance of Independent Social Democrats | 265,593 | 16.03 | 6 | 0 |
| SDS–NDP–NS–SRS | 162,414 | 9.80 | 3 | –2 |
| Social Democratic Party | 150,454 | 9.08 | 5 | 2 |
| HDZ–HSS–HSP–HSP AS–HKDU | 149,872 | 9.05 | 5 | 1 |
| Democratic Front–Civic Alliance | 96,174 | 5.81 | 3 | –2 |
| Party of Democratic Progress | 83,832 | 5.06 | 2 | 1 |
| Democratic People's Alliance | 69,289 | 4.18 | 1 | 0 |
| Union for a Better Future | 68,993 | 4.16 | 2 | –2 |
| Our Party | 48,401 | 2.92 | 2 | 2 |
| Independent Bloc | 41,512 | 2.51 | 1 | New |
| Movement of Democratic Action | 38,417 | 2.32 | 1 | New |
| Socialist Party | 31,321 | 1.89 | 1 | 1 |
| Party of Democratic Activity | 30,482 | 1.84 | 1 | 0 |
| HDZ 1990–HSP | 28,962 | 1.75 | 0 | 0 |
| People and Justice | 23,381 | 1.41 | 0 | New |
| Party for Bosnia and Herzegovina | 17,830 | 1.08 | 0 | 0 |
| Bosnian-Herzegovinian Patriotic Party | 16,433 | 0.99 | 0 | –1 |
| Independent Bosnian-Herzegovinian List | 12,505 | 0.75 | 0 | New |
| Labour Party | 7,734 | 0.47 | 0 | 0 |
| First Serb Democratic Party | 7,513 | 0.45 | 0 | New |
| Pensioners' Party | 7,185 | 0.43 | 0 | New |
| Bosnian Party | 5,771 | 0.35 | 0 | 0 |
| Serb Progressive Party | 4,750 | 0.29 | 0 | 0 |
| Union for New Politics | 2,109 | 0.13 | 0 | New |
| Croatian Party BiH | 1,095 | 0.07 | 0 | New |
| Liberal Democratic Party | 1,833 | 0.11 | 0 | New |
| The Left Wing | 930 | 0.06 | 0 | New |
| Total | 1,656,516 | 100.00 | 42 | 0 |
| Valid votes | 1,656,516 | 91.37 | | |
| Invalid/blank votes | 156,444 | 8.63 | | |
| Total votes | 1,812,960 | 100.00 | | |
| Registered voters/turnout | 3,355,429 | 54.03 | | |
Source: CEC

==== By entity ====
| Party | Federation | | | Republika Srpska | | | Total seats |
| Party | Votes | % | Seats | Votes | % | Seats | Total seats |
|---|---|---|---|---|---|---|---|
| Party of Democratic Action | 252,058 | 25.48 | 8 | 29,673 | 4.45 | 1 | 9 |
| Alliance of Independent Social Democrats | 4,663 | 0.47 | 0 | 260,930 | 39.10 | 6 | 6 |
| SDS–NDP–NS–SRS | | | | 162,414 | 24.34 | 3 | 3 |
| Social Democratic Party | 140,782 | 14.23 | 5 | 9,672 | 1.45 | 0 | 5 |
| HDZ–HSS–HSP–HSP AS–HKDU | 145,487 | 14.71 | 5 | 4,385 | 0.66 | 0 | 5 |
| Democratic Front–Civic Alliance | 96,174 | 9.72 | 3 | | | | 3 |
| Party of Democratic Progress | | | | 83,832 | 12.56 | 2 | 2 |
| Democratic People's Alliance | 652 | 0.07 | 0 | 68,637 | 10.29 | 1 | 1 |
| Union for a Better Future | 67,599 | 6.83 | 2 | 1,394 | 0.21 | 0 | 2 |
| Our Party | 48,401 | 4.89 | 2 | | | | 2 |
| Independent Bloc | 41,512 | 4.20 | 1 | | | | 1 |
| Movement of Democratic Action | 38,417 | 3.88 | 1 | | | | 1 |
| Socialist Party | | | | 31,321 | 4.69 | 1 | 1 |
| Party of Democratic Activity | 29,726 | 3.01 | 1 | 756 | 0.11 | 0 | 1 |
| HDZ 1990–HSP | 28,962 | 2.93 | 0 | | | | 0 |
| People and Justice | 23,381 | 2.36 | 0 | | | | 0 |
| Party for Bosnia and Herzegovina | 17,830 | 1.80 | 0 | | | | 0 |
| Bosnian-Herzegovinian Patriotic Party | 16,433 | 1.66 | 0 | | | | 0 |
| Independent Bosnian-Herzegovinian List | 12,505 | 1.26 | 0 | | | | 0 |
| Labour Party | 7,734 | 0.78 | 0 | | | | 0 |
| First Serb Democratic Party | | | | 7,513 | 1.13 | 0 | 0 |
| Pensioners' Party | 7,185 | 0.73 | 0 | | | | 0 |
| Bosnian Party | 5,771 | 0.58 | 0 | | | | 0 |
| Serb Progressive Party | | | | 4,750 | 0.71 | 0 | 0 |
| Union for New Politics | 728 | 0.07 | 0 | 1,381 | 0.21 | 0 | 0 |
| Croatian Party BiH | 1,095 | 0.11 | 0 | | | | 0 |
| Liberal Democratic Party | 1,833 | 0.19 | 0 | | | | 0 |
| The Left Wing | 264 | 0.03 | 0 | 666 | 0.10 | 0 | 0 |
| Total | 989,192 | 100.00 | 28 | 667,324 | 100.00 | 14 | 42 |
| Valid votes | 989,192 | 91.17 | | 667,324 | 91.67 | | |
| Invalid/blank votes | 95,844 | 8.83 | | 60,600 | 8.33 | | |
| Total votes | 1,085,036 | 100.00 | | 727,924 | 100.00 | | |
| Registered voters/turnout | 2,093,784 | 51.82 | | 1,261,645 | 57.70 | | |
Source: CEC

=== By electoral unit ===
==== Federation of Bosnia and Herzegovina ====
| Electoral Unit | SDA | HDZ BiH (Note: In coalition with HSS, HSP and HKDU.) | SDP BiH | DF–GS | SBB | NS | NB | PDA | A-SDA | Turnout |
|---|---|---|---|---|---|---|---|---|---|---|
| 1st | 23.89 | 11.02 | 9.57 | 9.30 | 5.66 | 2.58 | 3.55 | 0.03 | 17.28 | 40.69 |
| 2nd | 16.43 | 50.60 | 8.39 | 4.61 | 3.77 | 1.03 | 1.21 | – | 0.18 | 49.06 |
| 3rd | 27.56 | 0.96 | 11.46 | 12.72 | 11.02 | 13.96 | 1.72 | – | 0.85 | 56.34 |
| 4th | 31.56 | 16.10 | 14.69 | 8.40 | 6.51 | 1.73 | 10.96 | 0.63 | 1.94 | 53.81 |
| 5th | 22.44 | 7.61 | 21.94 | 11.47 | 5.48 | 2.97 | 0.95 | 15.41 | 1.14 | 51.52 |
| Total | 25.48 | 14.71 | 14.23 | 9.72 | 6.83 | 4.89 | 4.20 | 3.88 | 3.01 | 51.82 |
Source: izbori.ba

==== Republika Srpska ====
| Electoral Unit | SNSD | SDS (Note: In coalition with NDP, NS and SRS.) | PDP | DNS | SP | SDA | Turnout |
|---|---|---|---|---|---|---|---|
| 1st | 40.01 | 17.92 | 18.27 | 10.58 | 4.58 | 3.41 | 55.74 |
| 2nd | 35.96 | 31.50 | 9.86 | 6.50 | 5.84 | 5.07 | 55.47 |
| 3rd | 41.11 | 26.94 | 6.16 | 14.01 | 3.60 | 5.46 | 64.41 |
| Total | 39.10 | 24.34 | 12.56 | 10.29 | 4.69 | 4.45 | 57.70 |
Source: izbori.ba

== Reactions ==
Following the results and Željko Komšić's election to the Presidency, largely due to votes in majority Bosniak areas, Croatian Prime Minister Andrej Plenković, who endorsed the incumbent Presidency member Dragan Čović, criticized Komšić's victory: "We are again in a situation where members of one constituent people ... are electing a representative of another, the Croat people". Komšić responded that the Croatian Government was undermining Bosnia and Herzegovina and its sovereignty.

== See also ==
- 2018 Federation of Bosnia and Herzegovina general election
- 2018 Republika Srpska general election
