= For Justice and Order =

For Justice and Order За правду и ред Za pravdu i red
- President: Nebojša Vukanović
- Founded: 9 September 2014; 12 years ago
- Headquarters: Vožda Karađorđa 52, Trebinje
- Ideology: Anti-corruption; Pro-Europeanism; Conservatism
- Political position: Centre-right
- HoP BiH: 0 / 15
- HoR BiH: 1 / 42
- NA RS: 4 / 83

Website
- zapravduired.org

For Justice and Order (Serbian: За правду и ред, romanized: Za pravdu i red; abbr. ЗПР or ZPR) is a catch-all political organisation in Republika Srpska, Bosnia and Herzegovina. The movement was founded in September 2014 by Nebojša Vukanović.

== History ==
For Justice and Order was founded on 9 September 2014 by journalist Nebojša Vukanović. It describes itself as an economically focused, anti-nationalist and anti-corruption movement.

In the 2022 general election, the movement contested all levels of government except for the Presidency. It gained one seat in the national House of Representatives and four seats in the National Assembly of Republika Srpska.

== List of presidents ==
#	Name (Born–Died)	Portrait	Term of office	
1	Nebojša Vukanović (b. 1979)		9 September 2014	present

== Election results ==
=== Parliamentary Assembly of Bosnia and Herzegovina ===
Parliamentary Assembly of Bosnia and Herzegovina
Year	#	Popular vote	%	HoR	Seat change	HoP	Seat change	Government
2014	Did not participate			0 / 42	New	0 / 15	New	Extra-parliamentary
2018	Did not participate			0 / 42	0	0 / 15	0	Extra-parliamentary
2022	11th	32,982	2.08	1 / 42	▲1	0 / 15	0	Opposition
2026	13th	31,582	2.33	1 / 42	0	TBD	TBD	TBD

=== National Assembly of Republika Srpska ===
National Assembly of Republika Srpska
Year	#	Popular vote	%	# of seats	Seat change	Coalition	Government
2014	10th	8,874	1.34	0 / 83	New	—	Extra-parliamentary
2018	Run on SDS list			1 / 83	▲1	—	Opposition
2022	8th	31,558	4.93	4 / 83	▲3	—	Opposition
2026	8th	24,243	4.61	4 / 83	0	—	Opposition

=== Presidential elections ===
Presidency of Bosnia and Herzegovina
Election year	#	Candidate	Votes	%	Note	Elected?
2014	▲1st	Mladen Ivanić	318,196	48.71%	Support	Yes
2018	▼2nd	Mladen Ivanić	292,065	42.74%	Support	No
2022	2nd	Mirko Šarović	224,912	35.45%	Support	No
2026	▼3rd	Nebojša Vukanović	103,871	18.05%	—	No

President of Republika Srpska
Election year	#	Candidate	Votes	%	Note	Elected?
2014	2nd	Ognjen Tadić	296,021	44.28%	Support	No
2018	2nd	Vukota Govedarica	284,159	41.82%	Support	No
2022	2nd	Jelena Trivić	273,245	42.84%	Support	No
2025–26	2nd	Branko Blanuša	212,605	48.22%	Support	No
