= Party of Democratic Activity =

Conservative political party in Bosnia and Herzegovina

Party of Democratic Activity Stranka demokratske aktivnosti
- President: Nermin Ogrešević
- Founded: 4 February 2008
- Dissolved: 27 February 2021
- Split from: Party of Democratic Action
- Succeeded by: People's European Union
- Headquarters: Cazin
- Ideology: Bosniak nationalism Conservatism
- Political position: Center-right
- Slogan: "Zajedno možemo bolje" "We can do better together"

The Party of Democratic Activity (Bosnian: Stranka demokratske aktivnosti or A-SDA) was a conservative political party in Bosnia and Herzegovina.

== History ==
The party was established in February 2008 as a breakaway from the Party of Democratic Action. Based in Cazin, its founders included town mayor Nermin Ogrešević. In the 2010 general elections, A-SDA ran only in the Federation of Bosnia and Herzegovina part of Bosnia. It received 1.7% of the vote, failing to win a seat in the national House of Representatives, However, it won one seat in the House of Representatives of the Federation of Bosnia and Herzegovina with 1.9% of the vote.

In the 2014 elections the party increased its vote share to 2.25%, winning a seat in the national House of Representatives. It also won two seats in the Federal House. Its member of the country's legislature was Jasmin Emrić, who holds a seat in the Federation of Bosnia and Herzegovina's first division.

== Elections ==
=== Parliamentary elections ===
Parliamentary Assembly of Bosnia and Herzegovina
Year	#	Popular vote	HoR	Seat change	HoP	Seat change	Government
2010	15th	18,005	0 / 42	Steady	0 / 15	Steady	non-parliamentary
2014	13th	22,088	1 / 42	▲1	0 / 15	Steady	opposition
2018	14th	30,519	1 / 42	Steady	0 / 15	Steady	opposition
