= People's European Union of Bosnia and Herzegovina =

Bosnian political party

People's European Union of Bosnia and Herzegovina Narodni evropski savez Bosne i Hercegovine
- President: Nermin Ogrešević
- Founded: 27 February 2021
- Merger of: Party of Democratic Activity; Independent Bosnian-Herzegovinian List
- Headquarters: Obala Kulina bana 24/2, Sarajevo
- Ideology: Bosniak nationalism; Conservatism; Pro-Europeanism
- Political position: Centre to centre-right
- Colours: Green
- HoP BiH: 0 / 15
- HoR BiH: 1 / 42
- HoP FBiH: 4 / 80
- HoR FBiH: 4 / 98
- NA RS: 0 / 83
- Cantonal Heads: 1 / 10
- Mayors: 1 / 145

The People's European Union of Bosnia and Herzegovina (Bosnian: Narodni evropski savez Bosne i Hercegovine; abbreviated NES) is a centre to centre-right political party in Bosnia and Herzegovina. The party was formed on 27 February 2021

== History ==
The People's European Union was formed by the merger of the Party of Democratic Activity (A-SDA) and the Independent Bosnian-Herzegovinian List (NBL) on 27 February 2021 in Sarajevo.

The party was announced by the municipal mayor of Stari Grad Sarajevo and former NBL leader, Ibrahim Hadžibajrić, as an "enlargement" of the political scene. Former A-SDA president Nermin Ogrešević was named as president of the NES. Upon its formation, NES was part of the government of the Una-Sana Canton.

The NES inherited one seat in the national House of Representatives, which the A-SDA won in the 2018 general election. In the 2022 general election, the party won two seats in the House of Representatives.

== List of presidents ==
#	Name (Born–Died)	Portrait	Term of Office	
1	Nermin Ogrešević (b. 1972)		27 February 2021	present

== Election results ==
=== Parliamentary Assembly of Bosnia and Herzegovina ===
Parliamentary Assembly of Bosnia and Herzegovina
Year	Leader	#	Popular vote	%	HoR	Seat change	HoP	Seat change	Government
2022 (Note: Run in coalition with ZNG.)	Nermin Ogrešević	10th	47,157	2.97	2 / 42	New	0 / 15	New	Opposition
2026 (Note: Run as part of Together BiH (NES, NPD and PDA) which won a single seat that went to NES.)	Nermin Ogrešević	11th	33,324	2.46	1 / 42	▼1	TBA	TBA	TBA

=== Parliament of the Federation of Bosnia and Herzegovina ===
Parliament of the Federation of Bosnia and Herzegovina
Year	Leader	#	Popular vote	%	HoR	Seat change	HoP	Seat change	Government
2022	Nermin Ogrešević	7th	42,322	4.34	5 / 98	New	3 / 80	New	Support

=== Cantonal elections ===
Cantonal election	Cantonal Assembly										
Cantonal election	Una-Sana	Posavina	Tuzla	Zenica-Doboj	Bosnian Podrinje Goražde	Central Bosnia	Herzegovina-Neretva	West Herzegovina	Sarajevo	Canton 10	Total won / Total contested
2022	8 / 30	0 / 21	0 / 35	2 / 35	2 / 25	0 / 30	1 / 30	0 / 23	0 / 35	0 / 25	13 / 289
