= Bosnian Party =

Bosnian Party Bosanska stranka
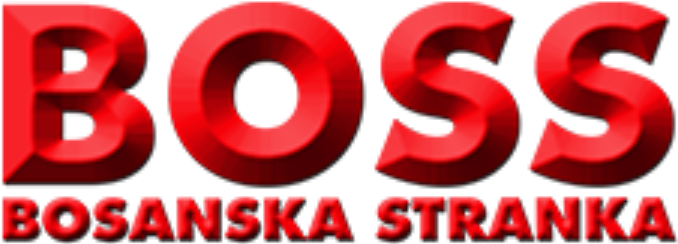
- President: Mirnes Ajanović
- Founded: 9 May 1994; 31 years ago
- Headquarters: Tuzla
- Ideology: Left-wing populism Liberalism
- Political position: Left-wing
- HoR BiH: 0 / 42
- HoP BiH: 0 / 15
- HoR FBiH: 0 / 98
- HoP FBiH: 0 / 80
- NA RS: 0 / 83

Website
- https://boss.ba/

The Bosnian Party (Bosanska stranka, BOSS) is a multi-ethnic left populist political party in Bosnia and Herzegovina. The party's president is Mirnes Ajanović.
