= House of Representatives of Bosnia and Herzegovina =

Lower house of Bosnia and Herzegovina

House of Representatives Predstavnički dom Zastupnički dom Представнички дом
- 10th legislature (incoming)
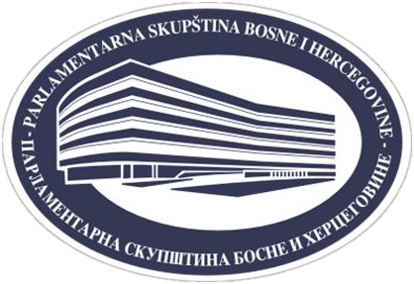

Type
- Type: Lower house

History
- Founded: 3 January 1997; 29 years ago

Leadership
- Chairperson: Darko Babalj (SDS) since 1 April 2026
- Vice-chairpeople: Denis Zvizdić (NiP); Marinko Čavara (HDZ BiH)

Structure
- Seats: 42
- Political groups: Government (20) SNSD (6) SDP BiH (5) HDZ BiH (4) NS (3) NiP (2) Supported by (6) NES (2) DEMOS (1) US (1) BHI (1) NPD (1) Opposition (16) SDA (8) DF–GS (3) SDS (2) PDP (2) ZPR (1)
- Committees: 15: Constitution; Foreign Affairs; Foreign Trade and Customs; Finance and Budget; Transport and Communications; Gender Equality; Preparation of the Election of the Council of Ministers; Anticorruption; Diaspora; Defence and Security (Joint Committee with the House of Peoples); Supervision of the work of the Intelligence and Security Agency (Joint Committee with the House of Peoples); Economic Reforms and Development (Joint Committee with the House of Peoples); European Integration (Joint Committee with the House of Peoples); Administrative Affairs (Joint Committee with the House of Peoples); Human Rights (Joint Committee with the House of Peoples)
- Length of term: 4 years
- Salary: 2,564 EUR per month

Elections
- Last election: 4 October 2026
- Next election: 6 October 2030

Meeting place
- Parliament Building; Sarajevo, Bosnia and Herzegovina; 43°51′16.48″N 18°24′20.63″E

Website
- www.parlament.ba

The House of Representatives of Bosnia and Herzegovina (Bosnian: Predstavnički dom Bosne i Hercegovine, Croatian: Zastupnički dom Bosne i Hercegovine and Serbian Cyrillic: Представнички дом Босне и Херцеговине) is one of the two chambers of the Parliamentary Assembly of Bosnia and Herzegovina, with the other being the House of Peoples of Bosnia and Herzegovina.

The chamber consists of 42 members which are elected by party-list proportional representation. 28 members are elected from the Federation of Bosnia and Herzegovina, and 14 from Republika Srpska. Members serve for terms of four years. The current membership of the chamber was elected on 2 October 2022.

== Electoral system ==
The house is elected by party-list proportional representation with open lists. For the first two elections, representatives were elected from nationwide lists, but in 2000, local representation was introduced. Eight constituencies, known as electoral units, each elect between three and six representatives, giving a total of 30. To ensure proportionality, a further 12 representatives are elected on an entity-wide basis. Each entity is allocated a number of these entity-wide seats, 7 members from the Federation of Bosnia and Herzegovina and 5 from Republika Srpska. When a party is entitled to one of these entity-wide seats, it is given to the candidate from the party who receives the most votes without being elected in his or her electoral unit, located in one of the two entities.

Brčko District voters are entitled to vote in only one of the two entities. Their vote is allocated to the corresponding electoral unit, depending on which entity the voter is voting from.

== Current composition ==
Government (20) Supported by (6) Opposition (16)

Composition of the House of Representatives of Bosnia and Herzegovina (as of 3 January 2024)
In-House Groups	Parties	Representatives
Party of Democratic Action; Stranka demokratske akcije	SDA	8
Alliance of Independent Social Democrats; Savez nezavisnih socijaldemokrata	SNSD	6
Social Democratic Party; Socijaldemokratska partija Bosne i Hercegovine	SDP BiH	5
Croatian Democratic Union; Hrvatska demokratska zajednica Bosne i Hercegovine	HDZ BiH	4
Democratic Front; Demokratska fronta	DF	3
People and Justice; Narod i Pravda	NiP	3
Serb Democratic Party; Srpska demokratska stranka	SDS	2
Party of Democratic Progress; Partija demokratskog progresa	PDP	2
Our Party; Naša stranka	NS	2
People's European Union; Narodni evropski savez Bosne i Hercegovine	NES	2
For Justice and Order; Za Pravdu i Red	ZPR	1
Democratic Union; Demokratski savez	DEMOS	1
United Srpska; Ujedinjena Srpska	US	1
Bosnian-Herzegovinian Initiative; Bosanskohercegovačka Inicijativa	BHI	1
Forward; Naprijed	NPD	1
Total		42

== Chairmen of the House of Representatives ==
Croatian Democratic Union Serb Democratic Party Party of Democratic Action Social Democratic Party Alliance of Independent Social Democrats Croatian Democratic Union 1990 Party for Bosnia and Herzegovina Union for a Better Future People and Justice

#	Name	Term of Office		Party
1	Ivo Lozančić	3 January 1997	2 September 1997	HDZ BiH
2	Slobodan Bijelić	2 September 1997	2 May 1998	SDS
3	Halid Genjac	2 May 1998	2 August 1999	SDA
4	Mirko Banjac	2 August 1999	2 April 2000	SDS
5	Pero Skopljak	2 April 2000	29 December 2000	HDZ BiH
6	Sead Avdić	29 December 2000	28 August 2001	SDP BiH
7	Željko Mirjanić	28 August 2001	28 April 2002	SNSD
8	Mariofil Ljubić	28 April 2002	9 December 2002	HDZ BiH
9	Šefik Džaferović	9 December 2002	8 August 2003	SDA
10	Nikola Špirić	8 August 2003	8 April 2004	SNSD
11	Martin Raguž	8 April 2004	8 December 2004	HDZ BiH
12	Šefik Džaferović	8 December 2004	8 August 2005	SDA
13	Nikola Špirić	8 August 2005	8 April 2006	SNSD
14	Martin Raguž	8 April 2006	11 January 2007	HDZ 1990
15	Beriz Belkić	11 January 2007	10 September 2007	SBiH
16	Milorad Živković	10 September 2007	10 May 2008	SNSD
17	Niko Lozančić	10 May 2008	10 January 2009	HDZ BiH
18	Beriz Belkić	10 January 2009	10 September 2009	SBiH
19	Milorad Živković	10 September 2009	10 May 2010	SNSD
20	Niko Lozančić	10 May 2010	30 November 2010	HDZ BiH
21	Adnan Bašić	30 November 2010	20 May 2011	SBB BiH
22	Denis Bećirović	20 May 2011	19 January 2012	SDP BiH
23	Milorad Živković	19 January 2012	19 September 2012	SNSD
24	Božo Ljubić	19 September 2012	19 May 2013	HDZ 1990
25	Denis Bećirović	19 May 2013	19 January 2014	SDP BiH
26	Milorad Živković	19 January 2014	19 September 2014	SNSD
27	Božo Ljubić	19 September 2014	9 December 2014	Ind.
28	Šefik Džaferović	9 December 2014	8 August 2015	SDA
29	Borjana Krišto	8 August 2015	8 April 2016	HDZ BiH
30	Mladen Bosić	8 April 2016	8 December 2016	SDS
31	Šefik Džaferović	8 December 2016	8 August 2017	SDA
32	Borjana Krišto	8 August 2017	8 April 2018	HDZ BiH
33	Mladen Bosić	8 April 2018	6 December 2018	SDS
34	Borjana Krišto	6 December 2018	5 August 2019	HDZ BiH
35	Denis Zvizdić	5 August 2019	5 April 2020	SDA
36	Nebojša Radmanović	5 April 2020	5 December 2020	SNSD
37	Borjana Krišto	5 December 2020	5 August 2021	HDZ BiH
38	Denis Zvizdić	5 August 2021	5 April 2022	NiP
39	Nebojša Radmanović	5 April 2022	1 December 2022	SNSD
40	Denis Zvizdić	1 December 2022	1 August 2023	NiP
41	Marinko Čavara	1 August 2023	1 April 2024	HDZ BiH
42	Nebojša Radmanović	1 April 2024	1 December 2024	SNSD
43	Denis Zvizdić	1 December 2024	1 August 2025	NiP
44	Marinko Čavara	1 August 2025	1 April 2026	HDZ BiH
45	Darko Babalj	1 April 2026	Incumbent	SDS

== See also ==
- Politics of Bosnia and Herzegovina
- Parliamentary Assembly of Bosnia and Herzegovina
- House of Peoples of Bosnia and Herzegovina
