= 2006 Republika Srpska general election =

Bosnian subnational election

← 2002	1 October 2006	2007 →
- Presidential election
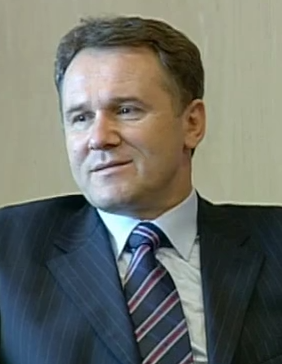

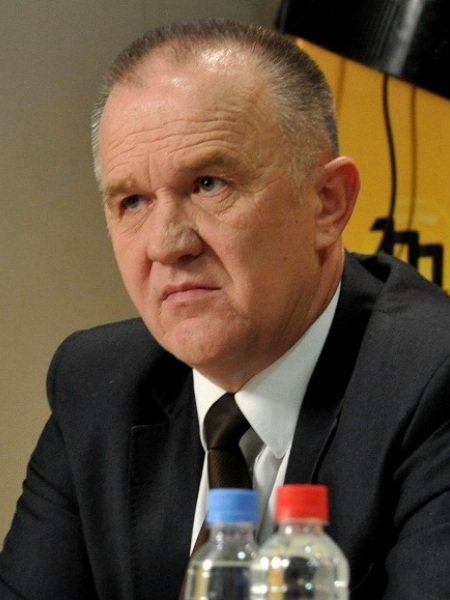
Candidate	Milan Jelić	Dragan Čavić
Party	SNSD	SDS
Popular vote	271,022	163,041
Percentage	48.87%	29.40%
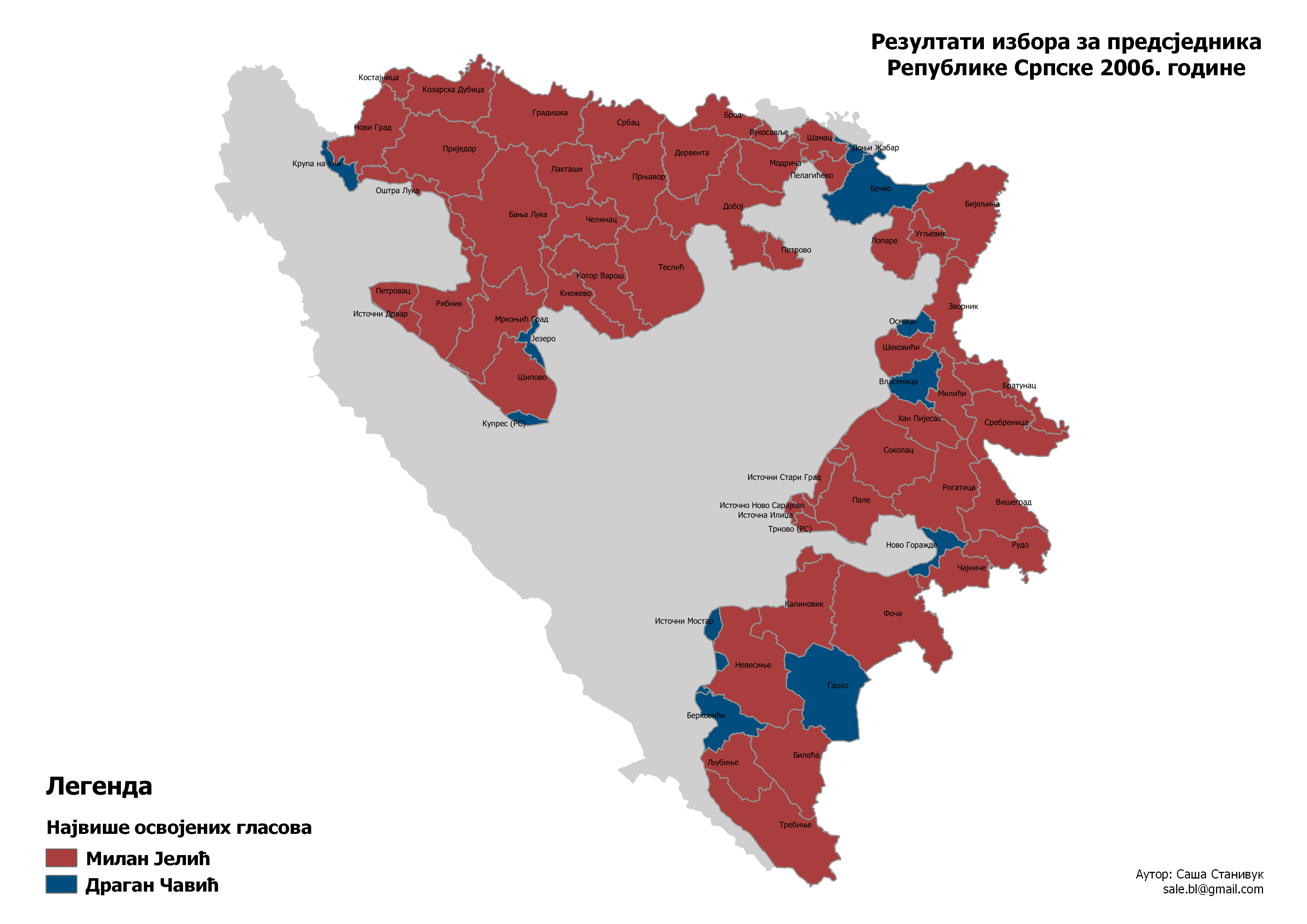
- Results by municipality
President before election
Dragan Čavić
SDS
Elected President
Milan Jelić
SNSD
- National Assembly election
- 83 seats in the National Assembly; 42 seats needed for a majority
Party	Leader	Vote %	Seats	+/–
SNSD	Milorad Dodik	43.31	41	+22
SDS	Dragan Čavić	18.27	17	−9
PDP	Mladen Ivanić	6.86	8	−1
DNS	Marko Pavić	4.04	4	+1
SBiH	Haris Silajdžić	4.01	4	0
SP	Petar Đokić	3.55	3	0
SDA	Sulejman Tihić	3.39	3	−3
SRS RS	Milanko Mihajlica	2.92	2	−2
SDP BiH	Zlatko Lagumdžija	2.50	1	−2
This lists parties that won seats. See the complete results below.
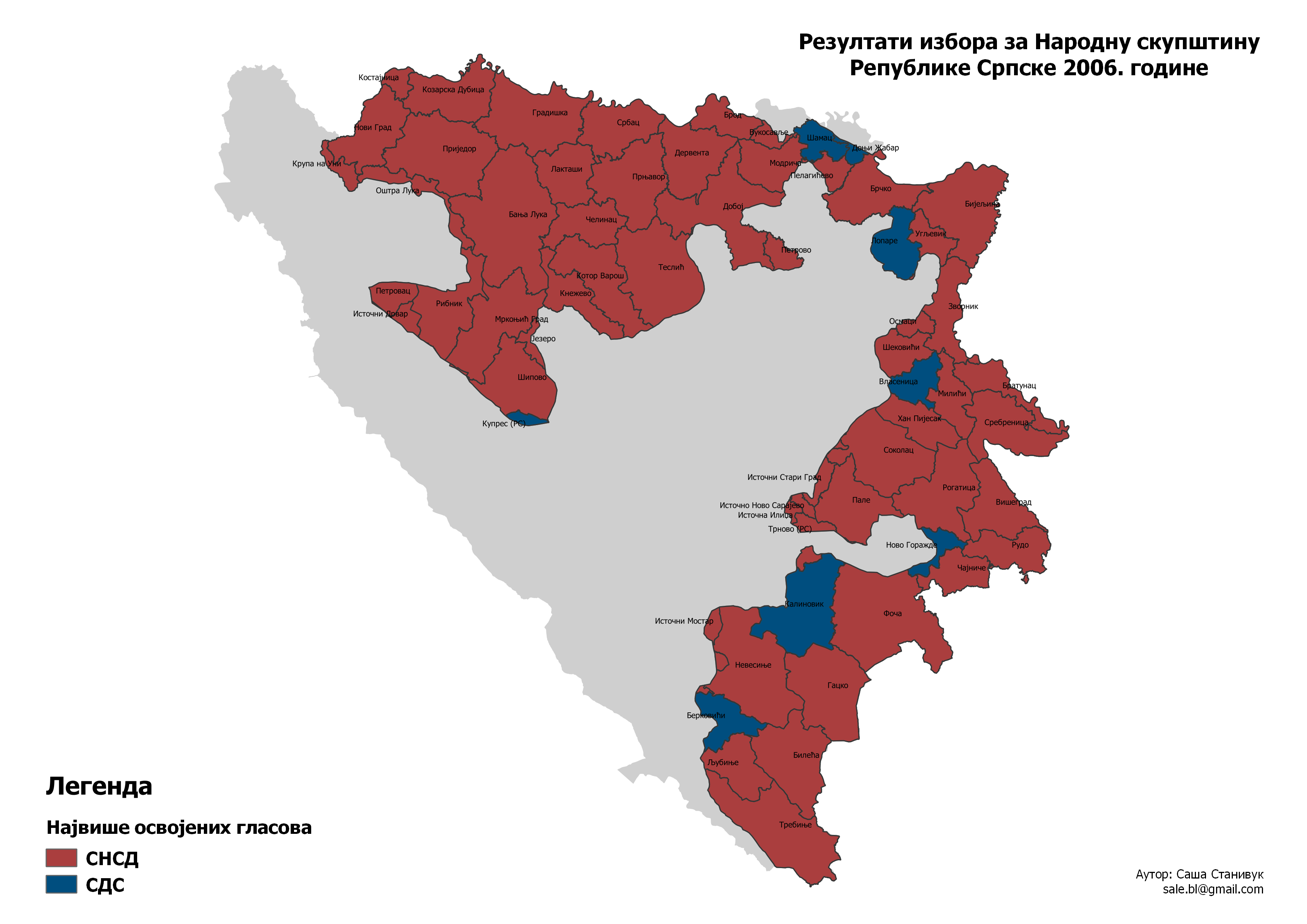
Colours denote the party with the most votes by municipalities.
Prime Minister before	Prime Minister after
Milorad Dodik; SNSD	Milorad Dodik; SNSD

General elections were held in Republika Srpska on 1 October 2006, as part of the general elections across Bosnia and Herzegovina.

The Alliance of Independent Social Democrats won these Presidential elections and have won every Presidential election since, As of 2025.

== Results ==
=== President ===
Candidate	Party	Votes	%
Milan Jelić	Alliance of Independent Social Democrats	271,022	48.87
Dragan Čavić	Serb Democratic Party	163,041	29.40
Adil Osmanović	Party of Democratic Action	22,444	4.05
Slobodan Nagradić	Party of Democratic Progress	19,623	3.54
Mirsad Mahmutović	Party for Bosnia and Herzegovina	18,744	3.38
Đurađ Davidović	Serbian Radical Party "Dr. Vojislav Šešelj"	14,852	2.68
Pero Bukejlović	Serbian Democratic Movement	12,690	2.29
Hakija Meholjić	Social Democratic Party	11,292	2.04
Davor Čordaš	Croatian Coalition for Equality (NHI–HDZ–HSP–HNZ)	4,598	0.83
Željko Grebenarević	People's Party Work for Prosperity	4,465	0.81
Dragan Krstić	Serbian New Power	3,380	0.61
Ivan Krndelj	Croats Together (HDZ1990–HSS–HKDU–HDU–HD)	3,270	0.59
Šaban Fejzić	National Congress Party	2,156	0.39
Nikola Lazarević	European Ecological Party E-5	1,686	0.30
Fatima Kararić	Democratic People's Union	971	0.18
Dragan Mrgan	Democratic People's Union	337	0.06
Total		554,571	100.00
Valid votes		554,571	93.65
Invalid/blank votes		37,625	6.35
Total votes		592,196	100.00
Source: Central Elections Committee

=== National Assembly ===
Party	Votes	%	Seats			
Party	Votes	%	Direct	Compensatory	Total	+/–
Alliance of Independent Social Democrats	244,251	43.31	32	9	41	+22
Serb Democratic Party	103,035	18.27	13	4	17	–9
Party of Democratic Progress	38,681	6.86	6	2	8	–1
Democratic People's Alliance	22,780	4.04	3	1	4	+1
Party for Bosnia and Herzegovina	22,642	4.01	1	3	4	0
Socialist Party	20,031	3.55	3	0	3	0
Party of Democratic Action	19,137	3.39	1	2	3	–3
Serbian Radical Party	16,454	2.92	2	0	2	–2
Social Democratic Party	14,079	2.50	1	0	1	–2
Pensioners' Party–National Democratic Party	14,055	2.49	0	0	0	–1
Serbian Radical Party "Dr. Vojislav Šešelj"	12,717	2.25	0	0	0	New
Serbian Democratic Movement	10,058	1.78	0	0	0	New
People's Party Work for Prosperity	6,833	1.21	0	0	0	0
Croatian Coalition for Equality (NHI–HDZ–HSP–HNZ)	4,978	0.88	0	0	0	–1
Serbian Democratic Party	4,232	0.75	0	0	0	New
Serbian New Power	3,119	0.55	0	0	0	New
Independent Democratic Party	2,683	0.48	0	0	0	New
Croats Together (HDZ1990–HSS–HKDU–HDU–HD)	950	0.17	0	0	0	0
Bosnian-Herzegovinian Patriotic Party	759	0.13	0	0	0	0
Patriotic Bloc (BOSS–SDU)	455	0.08	0	0	0	0
European Ecological Party E-5	432	0.08	0	0	0	New
Youth Political Movement	419	0.07	0	0	0	New
Democratic People's Union	225	0.04	0	0	0	0
Bosnian Drina People's Party	163	0.03	0	0	0	0
National Congress Party	102	0.02	0	0	0	New
Greens of Bosnia and Herzegovina	85	0.02	0	0	0	New
BH Free Democrats	62	0.01	0	0	0	New
Civic Democratic Party	27	0.00	0	0	0	0
Independents	551	0.10	0	0	0	0
Total	563,995	100.00	62	21	83	0
Valid votes	563,995	95.28				
Invalid/blank votes	27,931	4.72				
Total votes	591,926	100.00				
Source: Central Elections Committee
