= Nermin Purić =

Bosnia and Herzegovina politician

Nermin Purić (born 15 May 1981) is a politician in Bosnia and Herzegovina. He served in the House of Representatives of Bosnia and Herzegovina from 2010 to 2014 as a member of the Democratic People's Union (Bosnian: Demokratska narodna zajednica, DNZ).

== Early life ==
Purić was born in Ljubljana, Slovenia, then part of the Socialist Federal Republic of Yugoslavia. He was a journalist for the Public Company Radio Television Velika Kladuša from 2001 to 2004 and a spokesperson for the Democratic People's Union from 2004 to 2006. Purić is an economist; his parliamentary biography indicates that he taught at Banja Luka College until 2009, and his LinkedIn profile indicates that he holds a master's degree in International Business Management from the Carinthia University of Applied Sciences.

== Parliamentary career ==
Purić was elected to the House of Representatives of the Federation of Bosnia and Herzegovina (one of the two entities that makes up the country Bosnia and Herzegovina) in the 2006 general election, taking the second of two seats won by the Democratic People's Union in the Federation's first electoral division. He served in this legislature for four years.

He was elected to the House of Representatives of Bosnia and Herzegovina in the 2010 general election, again winning a seat in the first electoral division of the Federation of Bosnia and Herzegovina. The only member of his party to win election to the legislature in 2010, he served in a mixed caucus that also included members of the Croatian Democratic Union 1990–Croatian Party of Rights alliance.

In October 2011, Purić was appointed to a legislative committee mandated to facilitate implementation of the European Court of Human Rights decision in the case of Sejdić and Finci v. Bosnia and Herzegovina.

The DNZ underwent a significant split in 2013, with several members joining the newly formed Labour Party of Bosnia and Herzegovina. Purić seems to have remained with the DNZ during this period. He was not a candidate in the 2014 general election. His LinkedIn profile indicates that he continued to work for the Bosnian parliament until 2015 and has since worked in management consulting in Austria.

== Electoral record ==
2010 Bosnia and Herzegovina State House of Representatives election results: Federation of Bosnia and Herzegovina, Division One

Party	Votes	%	Mandates
Social Democratic Party of Bosnia and Herzegovina	32,757	23.87	1
Party of Democratic Action	27,925	20.35	1
Democratic People's Union	14,238	10.38	1
Croatian Democratic Union of Bosnia and Herzegovina	10,861	7.91	
Party of Democratic Activity	10,782	7.86	
Union for a Better Future of BiH	8,939	6.51	
Party for Bosnia and Herzegovina	8,080	5.89	
People's Party For Work And Betterment	7,176	5.23	
Croatian Coalition HDZ 1990–HSP BiH	7,123	5.19	
Alliance of Independent Social Democrats	4,998	3.64	
Democratic People's Alliance	1,147	0.84	
Our Party–New Socialist Party	1,065	0.78	
Bosnian-Herzegovinian Patriotic Party-Sefer Halilović	872	0.64	
Bosnian Party	423	0.31	
Social Democratic Union of Bosnia and Herzegovina	357	0.26	
Democratic Party of the Disabled	256	0.19	
Party for the People of Bosnia and Herzegovina	225	0.16	
Total valid votes	137,224	100.00	

Party of Democratic Action candidate preference votes
Senad Šepić (elected)	13,637
Husein Nanić (incumbent)	6,924
Sanjin Halimović	6,595
Asima Husetić	4,175
Šefik Štulanović	3,286
Zejna Kadirić	2,917
Suada Dilaver	1,753

Democratic People's Union candidate preference votes
Nermin Purić (elected)	8,244
Almir Pajazetović	2,604
Emina Keserović	1,607
Nura Kekić	1,587
Safet Huskić	1,540
Vera Došenović	1,295
Jasmin Durmić	1,279
Milenko Došen	1,139

Source: Verified results of the 2010 General Election, Central Election Committee of Bosnia and Herzegovina, accessed 3 October 2012 and 19 March 2016.

2006 Federation of Bosnia and Herzegovina House of Representatives election results: Division One

Party Results	Votes	%	Direct mandates
Party of Democratic Action	32,907	36.25	4
Party for Bosnia and Herzegovina	16,751	18.45	2
Democratic People's Union	15,206	16.75	2
Social Democratic Party of Bosnia and Herzegovina–Socijaldemokrati BiH	13,462	14.83	1
Bosnian-Herzegovinian Patriotic Party-Sefer Halilović	2,237	2.46	
Alliance of Independent Social Democrats	1,767	1.95	
Evropska ekološka stranka E-5	1,537	1.69	
Patriotski Blok: Bosnian Party–Social Democratic Union of Bosnia and Herzegovina	1,283	1.41	
People's Party For Work And Betterment	1,145	1.26	
Pensioners' Party of Bosnia and Herzegovina	1,126	1.24	
Bosanskohercegovačka stranka prava	569	0.63	
Liberal Democratic Party	484	0.53	
Pokret za promjene Bosne i Hercegovine	459	0.51	
Croatian Democratic Union of Bosnia and Herzegovina—Croatian Coalition: HNZ–HSP BiH	411	0.45	
Politički pokret mladih Bosne i Hercegovine	351	0.39	
Democratic Party of the Disabled	249	0.27	
Socialist Party	212	0.23	
Citizens' Democratic Party	211	0.23	
Narodna bošnjaka stranka	198	0.22	
Croats Together: HDZ 1990–HSS–HKDU–HDU–Demokrŝćani	159	0.18	
HSP Đapić–Jurišić and the New Croatian Initiative–Koalicija za jednakopravnost	58	0.06	
Total valid votes	90,782	100.00	

Party of Democratic Action candidate preference votes
Senad Šepić (elected) (incumbent)	9,950
Edham Veladžić (elected)	9,615
Jasminka Durić (elected)	9,523
Ibrahim Nadarević (elected) (incumbent)	7,214
Sead Jusić	6,511
Amela Hadžić	6,287
Atif Hodžić	5,334
Jasmin Husetić	4,437
Mira Bjelac (elected to compensatory list seat)	2,439

Democratic People's Union candidate preference votes
Hafeza Sabljaković (elected)	7,905
Nermin Purić (elected)	3,717
Fatma Koštić	1,705
Dino Miljković	1,583
Husein Keranović	1,568
Edin Kekić	1,474
Raska Ćerimović	1,400
Vojo Šljivar	1,334
Mersud Topić	1,222
Jasmin Durmić	1,185
Haseba Mokni-Miljković	1,095

Source: Verified results of the 2006 General Election, Central Election Committee of Bosnia and Herzegovina, accessed 12 November 2012 and 23 March 2016.
