= 2006 Bosnian general election =

- 1 October 2006
- Turnout: 55.31% (presidential) ▼0.14 pp 55.36% (parliamentary) ▼0.10 pp
- Bosniak member of the Presidency
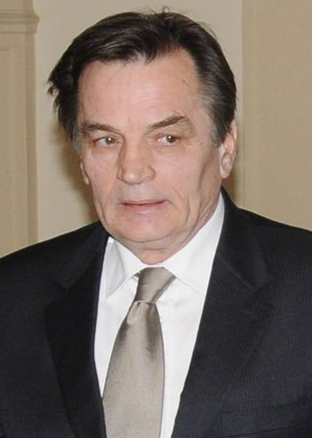

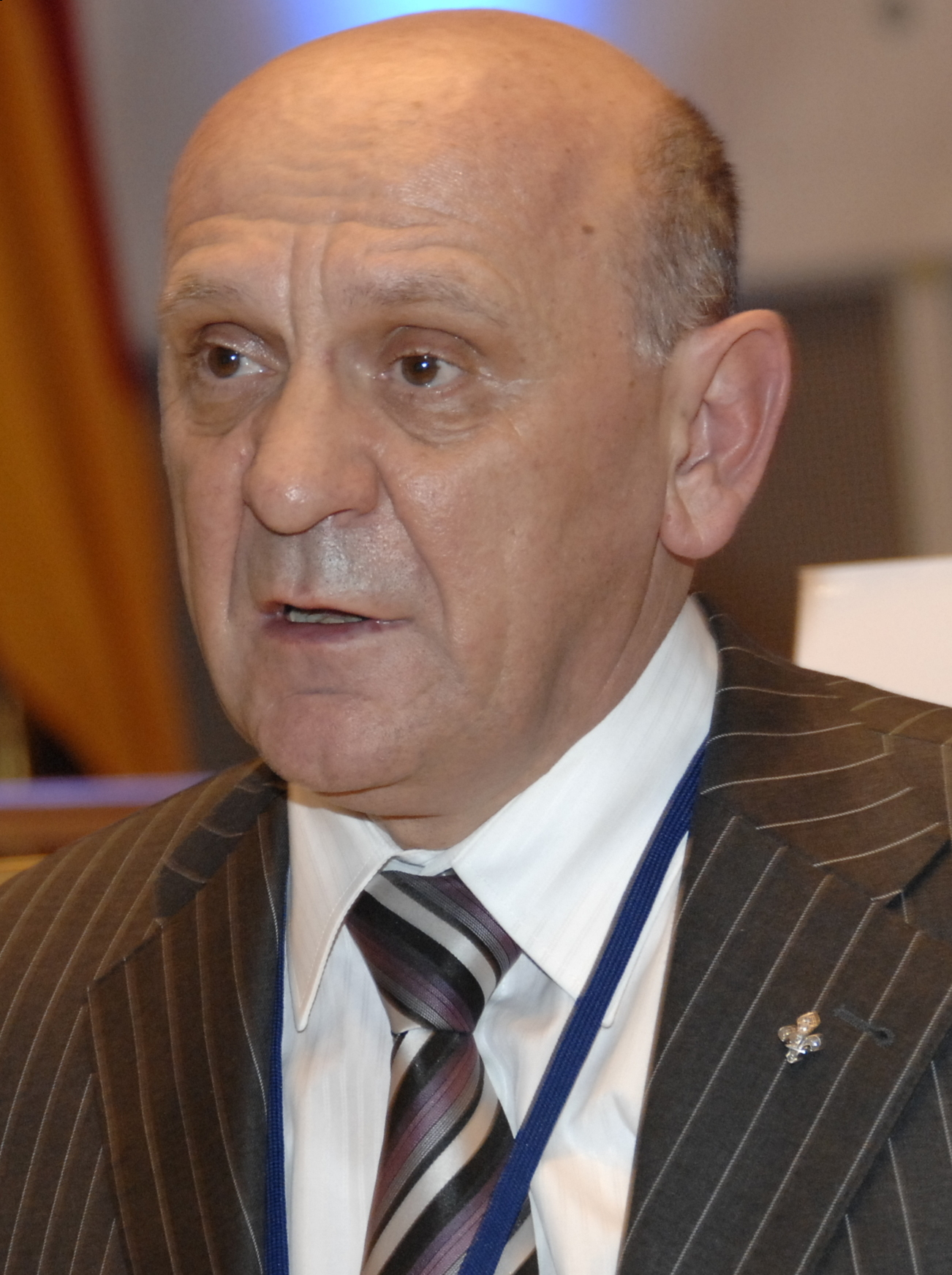
Candidate	Haris Silajdžić	Sulejman Tihić
Party	SBiH	SDA
Popular vote	350,520	153,683
Percentage	62.80%	27.53%
- Croat member of the Presidency
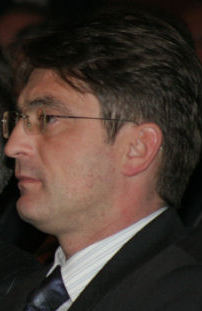

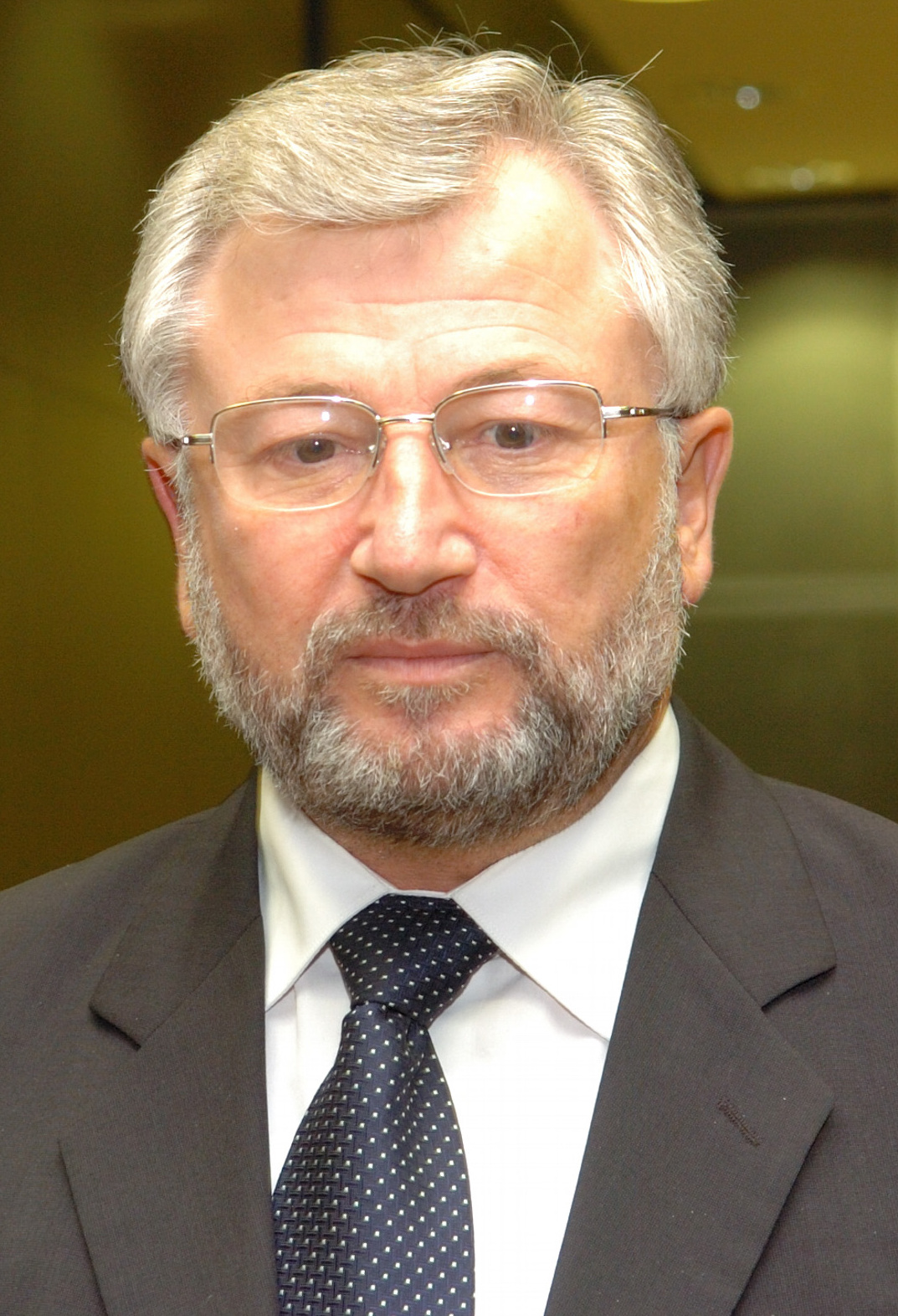
Candidate	Željko Komšić	Ivo Miro Jović
Party	SDP BiH	HDZ BiH
Popular vote	116,062	76,681
Percentage	39.56%	26.14%
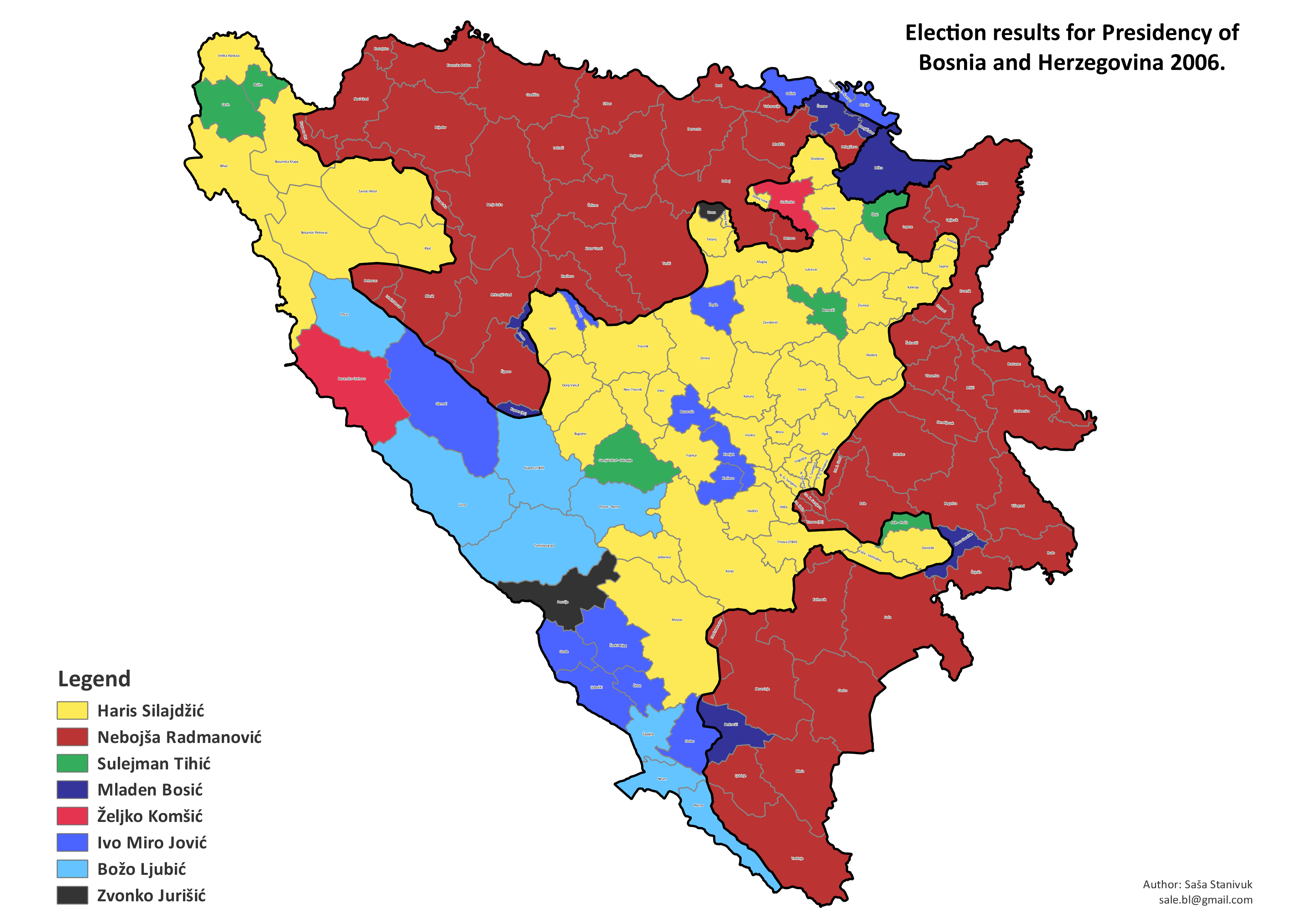
- Results by municipality.
- Serb member of the Presidency
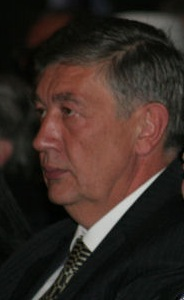

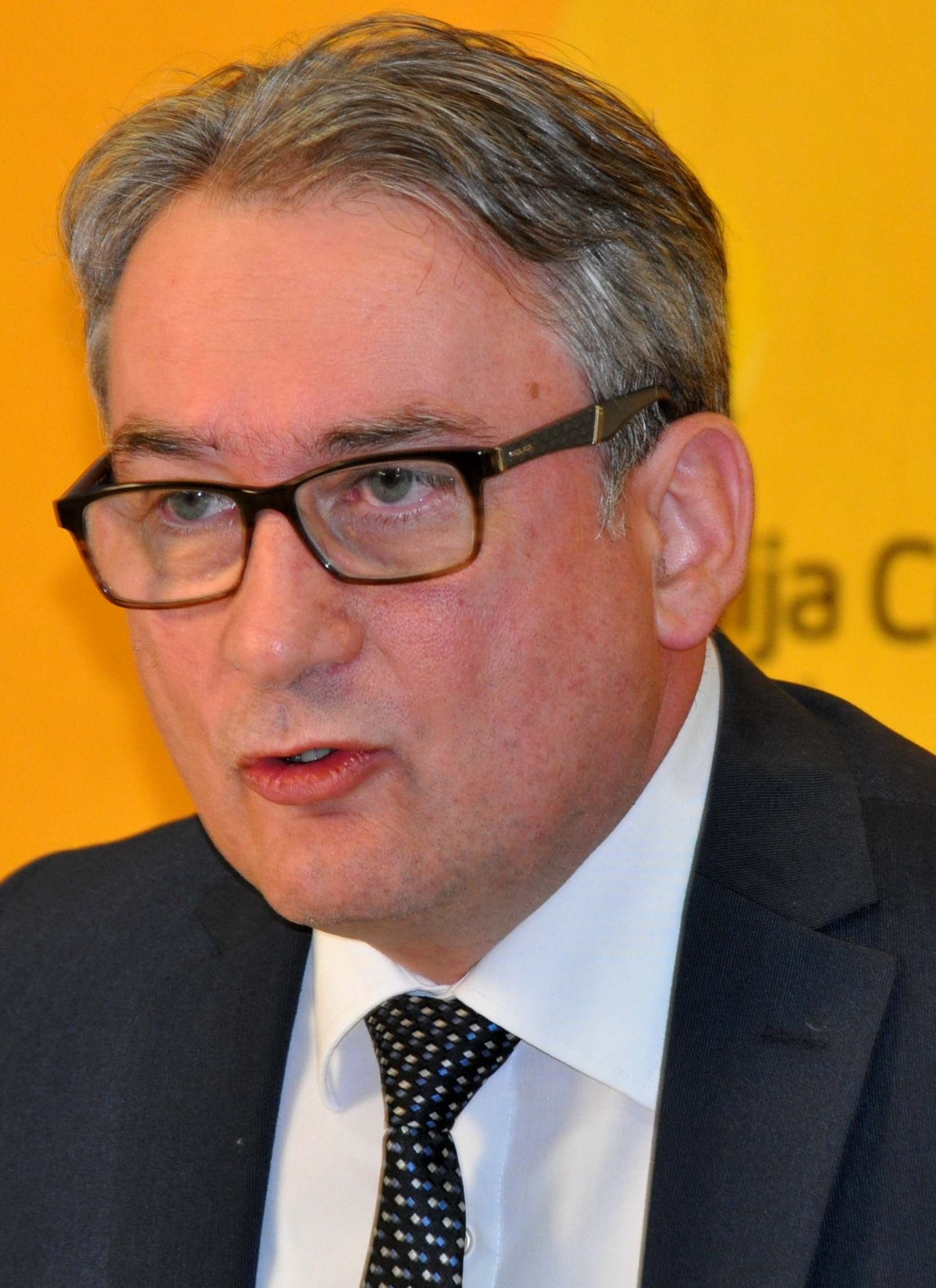
Candidate	Nebojša Radmanović	Mladen Bosić
Party	SNSD	SDS
Popular vote	287,675	130,824
Percentage	53.26%	24.22%
- Results by municipality for the Serb member of the Presidency
Presidency members before election
Sulejman Tihić (Bosniak)
Ivo Miro Jović (Croat)
Borislav Paravac (Serb)
Elected Presidency members
Haris Silajdžić (Bosniak)
Željko Komšić (Croat)
Nebojša Radmanović (Serb)
- House of Representatives
- All 42 seats in the House of Representatives; 22 seats needed for a majority
Party	Leader	Vote %	Seats	+/–
SNSD	Milorad Dodik	19.08	7	+4
SDA	Sulejman Tihić	16.89	9	−1
SBiH	Haris Silajdžić	15.54	8	+2
SDP BiH	Zlatko Lagumdžija	10.15	5	+1
SDS	Dragan Čavić	7.69	3	−2
HDZ–HNZ–HSP	Dragan Čović	4.91	3	−2
Croats Together	Božo Ljubić	3.73	2	+2
BPS	Sefer Halilović	2.72	1	+1
NSRzB	Mladen Ivanković-Lijanović	2.34	1	0
PDP	Mladen Ivanić	2.01	1	−1
DNS	Marko Pavić	1.42	1	+1
DNZ	Fikret Abdić	1.17	1	0
This lists parties that won seats. See the complete results below.

Chairman before	Chairman after
Adnan Terzić; SDA	Nikola Špirić; SNSD

Logo of the 2006 general election

General elections were held in Bosnia and Herzegovina on 1 October 2006. They decided the makeup of Bosnia and Herzegovina's Presidency as well as national, entity, and cantonal governments.

The elections for the House of Representatives were divided into two; one for the Federation of Bosnia and Herzegovina and one for Republika Srpska. In the presidential election, voters in the Federation elected Bosniak Haris Silajdžić and Croat Željko Komšić, while voters in Republika Srpska elected Serb Nebojša Radmanović. The Party of Democratic Action emerged as the largest party in the House of Representatives, winning 9 of the 42 seats.

== Background ==
Analysts claimed that the 2006 election would be the most important since Bosnia and Herzegovina's independence from Yugoslavia, and the subsequent Bosnian War. With the previous government failing to agree reforms to the constitution, and Bosnian Muslim politicians continuing to threaten the abolition of Republika Srpska and officials in Republika Srpska continuing to speak of possible secession from the country in response, the election was seen as crucial in determining the future of Bosnia and Herzegovina. The results were tentatively welcomed by commentators, and described as bringing "small signs of change to a Bosnia where institutional fragmentation has cemented ethnic division", with the result suggesting "a certain retreat of nationalism among the Muslim and Croat communities".

== Controversy ==
A controversy emerged over the election of the Croatian member of Presidency. Although Željko Komšić, an ethnic Croat and member of the Social Democratic Party, he was alleged by his political opponents to have received votes mainly from Bosniaks. He was accused by his opponents that he was not the choice of Croats, but rather Bosniaks, citing that he did not win majority for Croat representative in any of the cantons with Croat majority. This is the result of the fact that in the Federation of Bosnia and Herzegovina, both Bosniak and Croat Presidency members are on one ballot, letting the voter choose to vote in either category regardless of their own ethnicity.

== Results ==
=== Presidency ===
One Presidency member was elected from each of the country's three constitutional peoples: Bosniaks, Croats and Serbs.

Candidate	Party	Votes	%
Bosniak member
Haris Silajdžić	Party for Bosnia and Herzegovina	350,520	62.80
Sulejman Tihić	Party of Democratic Action	153,683	27.53
Mirnes Ajanović	Patriotic Bloc (BOSS–SDU BiH)	45,608	8.17
Muhamed Čengić	People's Party Work for Prosperity	4,466	0.80
Bešćo Alibegović	Independent	2,670	0.48
Adil Žigić	Independent	1,245	0.22
Total		558,192	100.00
Croat member
Željko Komšić	Social Democratic Party	116,062	39.56
Ivo Miro Jović	Croatian Democratic Union	76,681	26.14
Božo Ljubić	Croatian Democratic Union 1990	53,325	18.18
Mladen Ivanković Lijanović	People's Party Work for Prosperity	24,822	8.46
Zvonko Jurišić	Croatian Party of Rights	20,350	6.94
Irena Korjenić Javor	Independent	2,143	0.73
Total		293,383	100.00
Serb member
Nebojša Radmanović	Alliance of Independent Social Democrats	287,675	53.26
Mladen Bosić	Serb Democratic Party	130,824	24.22
Zoran Tešanović	Party of Social Progress	26,818	4.96
Jugoslav Jovičić	Social Democratic Party	22,245	4.12
Radislav Kanjerić	Serbian Radical Party	19,849	3.67
Ranko Bakić	People's Party Work for Prosperity	18,302	3.39
Nedo Durić	Srpska Democratic Movement	16,307	3.02
Slavko Dragičević	Patriotic Bloc (BOSS–SDU BiH)	10,410	1.93
Svjetlana Udovičić	Independent	2,847	0.53
Snežana Avdalović	Independent	2,753	0.51
Branislav Ristić	Independent	2,143	0.40
Total		540,173	100.00
Source: Nohlen & Stöver, CEC

=== House of Representatives ===
According to the constitution of Bosnia and Herzegovina, the representatives from the Federation of Bosnia and Herzegovina are allocated 28 seats, while the representatives from Republika Srpska have 14 seats. There are 42 seats in total.

Party	Votes	%	Seats
Alliance of Independent Social Democrats	269,468	19.08	7
Party of Democratic Action	238,475	16.89	9
Party for Bosnia and Herzegovina	219,487	15.54	8
Social Democratic Party	143,272	10.15	5
Serb Democratic Party	108,616	7.69	3
Croatian Coalition (HDZ–HNZ–HSP)	69,333	4.91	3
Croats Together (HDZ 1990–HSS–HKDU–HDU–HD)	52,686	3.73	2
Bosnian-Herzegovinian Patriotic Party	38,474	2.72	1
People's Party Work for Prosperity	33,020	2.34	1
Party of Democratic Progress	28,410	2.01	1
Coalition for Equality (HSP–NHI)	24,415	1.73	0
Patriotic Bloc (BOSS–SDU BiH)	23,767	1.68	0
Democratic People's Alliance	20,100	1.42	1
Democratic People's Union	16,542	1.17	1
Serbian Radical Party	15,806	1.12	0
Serbian Radical Party "Dr. Vojislav Šešelj"	14,714	1.04	0
Socialist Party	14,331	1.01	0
PS RS–NDS	12,340	0.87	0
Pensioners' Party	11,790	0.83	0
Youth Political Movement	8,513	0.60	0
Liberal Democratic Party	8,337	0.59	0
Serbian Democratic Movement	7,807	0.55	0
Movement for Change	6,091	0.43	0
European Ecological Party E5	5,572	0.39	0
Civic Democratic Party	4,722	0.33	0
People's Bosniak Party	3,848	0.27	0
Democratic Party of the Disabled	3,475	0.25	0
Serbian New Power	2,712	0.19	0
Democratic Socialist Alliance	2,350	0.17	0
BH Free Democrats	1,657	0.12	0
KNSZPBG-PMBiH	1,382	0.10	0
Bosnian Drina People's Party	566	0.04	0
Total	1,412,078	100.00	42
Valid votes	1,412,078	93.29	
Invalid/blank votes	101,519	6.71	
Total votes	1,513,597	100.00	
Registered voters/turnout	2,734,287	55.36	
Source: Nohlen & Stöver, IPU

==== By entity ====
Party	Federation			Republika Srpska			Total seats
Party	Votes	%	Seats	Votes	%	Seats	Total seats
Alliance of Independent Social Democrats	7,265	0.85	0	262,203	46.93	7	7
Party of Democratic Action	217,961	25.54	8	20,514	3.67	1	9
Party for Bosnia and Herzegovina	196,230	22.99	7	23,257	4.16	1	8
Social Democratic Party	131,450	15.40	5	11,822	2.12	0	5
Serb Democratic Party				108,616	19.44	3	3
Croatian Coalition (HDZ–HNZ–HSP)	68,188	7.99	3	1,145	0.20	0	3
Croats Together (HDZ1990–HSS–HKDU–HDU–HD)	52,095	6.10	2	591	0.11	0	2
Bosnian-Herzegovinian Patriotic Party	37,608	4.41	1	866	0.16	0	1
People's Party Work for Prosperity	27,487	3.22	1	5,533	0.99	0	1
Party of Democratic Progress				28,410	5.08	1	1
Coalition for Equality (HSP–NHI)	19,486	2.28	0	4,929	0.88	0	0
Patriotic Bloc (BOSS–SDU BiH)	23,605	2.77	0	162	0.03	0	0
Democratic People's Alliance	232	0.03	0	19,868	3.56	1	1
Democratic People's Union	16,221	1.90	1	321	0.06	0	1
Serbian Radical Party				15,806	2.83	0	0
Serbian Radical Party "Dr. Vojislav Šešelj"				14,714	2.63	0	0
Socialist Party	1,752	0.21	0	12,579	2.25	0	0
PS RS–NDS				12,340	2.21	0	0
Pensioners' Party	11,790	1.38	0				0
Youth Political Movement	7,713	0.90	0	800	0.14	0	0
Liberal Democratic Party	8,337	0.98	0				0
Serbian Democratic Movement				7,807	1.40	0	0
Movement for Change	6,091	0.71	0				0
European Ecological Party E5	5,053	0.59	0	519	0.09	0	0
Civic Democratic Party	4,322	0.51	0	400	0.07	0	0
People's Bosniak Party	3,848	0.45	0				0
Democratic Party of the Disabled	3,475	0.41	0				0
Serbian New Power				2,712	0.49	0	0
Democratic Socialist Alliance				2,350	0.42	0	0
BH Free Democrats	1,657	0.19	0				0
KNSZPBG-PMBiH	1,013	0.12	0	369	0.07	0	0
Bosnian Drina People's Party	493	0.06	0	73	0.01	0	0
Total	853,372	100.00	28	558,706	100.00	14	42
Valid votes	853,372	92.57		558,706	94.42		
Invalid/blank votes	68,492	7.43		33,027	5.58		
Total votes	921,864	100.00		591,733	100.00		
Registered voters/turnout	1,697,556	54.31		1,036,731	57.08		
Source: Nohlen & Stöver, IPU

=== House of Peoples ===
The 15 members of the House of Peoples were elected in the entities' Parliaments - 10 members by the House of Representatives of the Federal Parliament (5 Bosniaks and 5 Croats); and 5 members by the National Assembly of Republika Srpska.

== Entity Parliaments ==
On the entity level, the Federation of Bosnia and Herzegovina and Republika Srpska elected new governments.

=== Federation of Bosnia and Herzegovina ===
In the Federation this includes:

- Federal Prime Minister
- Federal House of Representatives
- Federal House of Peoples

==== House of Representatives of the Federation of Bosnia and Herzegovina ====
Party	Votes	%	Seats
Party of Democratic Action	218,365	25.45	28
Party for Bosnia and Herzegovina	190,148	22.16	24
Social Democratic Party	130,204	15.17	17
Croatian Coalition (HDZ–HNZ–HSP)	64,906	7.56	8
Croats Together (HDZ1990–HSS–HKDU–HDU–HD)	54,210	6.32	7
Bosnian-Herzegovinian Patriotic Party	35,223	4.10	4
Patriotic Bloc (BOSS–SDU BiH)	27,200	3.17	3
People's Party Work for Prosperity	27,132	3.16	3
Coalition for Equality (HSP–NHI)	21,152	2.46	1
Democratic People's Union	16,014	1.87	2
Pensioners' Party	12,660	1.48	0
Alliance of Independent Social Democrats	12,564	1.46	1
Liberal Democratic Party	7,622	0.89	0
Movement for Change	7,157	0.83	0
Youth Political Movement	6,310	0.74	0
European Ecological Party E5	6,310	0.74	0
Civic Democratic Party	5,027	0.59	0
People's Bosniak Party	4,346	0.51	0
Democratic Party of the Disabled	3,527	0.41	0
Greens of Bosnia and Herzegovina	1,918	0.22	0
BH Free Democrats	1,376	0.16	0
Bosniak Party of Rights	1,332	0.16	0
KNSZPBG-PMBiH	979	0.11	0
Socialist Party	902	0.11	0
Bosnian Drina People's Party	826	0.10	0
Party of Democratic Progress	530	0.06	0
Democratic People's Alliance	165	0.02	0
Total	858,105	100.00	98
Valid votes	858,105	93.06	
Invalid/blank votes	64,020	6.94	
Total votes	922,125	100.00	
Source: CEC

=== Republika Srpska ===
In the Republika Srpska, the government is made up of:

- President (Serb) and vice-presidents (Croat and Bosniak) of Republika Srpska
- Prime Minister of Republika Srpska
- National Assembly of Republika Srpska

== Canton Parliaments ==
All 289 mandates in the assemblies of the Cantons of the Federation of Bosnia and Herzegovina were up for election; the same parties elected into the Federal Parliament were elected onto cantonal assemblies (skupština kantona/скупштина кантона in Bosnian and Serbian, sabor županije in Croatian).

Party	USK	PK	TK	ZDK	BPK	SBK	HNK	ZHK	KS	K10	Total
Party of Democratic Action (SDA)	12	2	12	13	9	8	6	-	10	2	74
Party for Bosnia and Herzegovina (Za BiH)	6	1	7	11	8	7	5	-	13	1	59
Social Democratic Party (SDP)	6	2	11	5	6	3	2	-	7	1	43
Croatian Democratic Union BiH (HDZ BiH)	-	7	-	2	-	6	7	9	-	5	36
Croatian Democratic Union 1990 (HDZ1990)	-	5	-	-	-	3	7	8	-	6	29
Croatian Party of Right/New Croatian Initiative	-	2	-	-	-	2	2	4	-	4	14
People's Party Work for Betterment	-	2	2	1	1	1	-	2	-	1	10
Bosnian-Herzegovinian Patriotic Party-Sefer Halilović (BPS)	-	-	1	3	1	-	1	-	2	-	8
Democratic People's Community	6	-	-	-	-	-	-	-	-	-	6
Bosnian Party/Social Democratic Union (BOSS/SDU)	-	-	2	-	-	-	-	-	3	-	5
Alliance of Independent Social Democrats	-	-	-	-	-	-	-	-	-	5	5

Source - Central Electoral Commission of Bosnia and Herzegovina
