= 2014 West Herzegovina parliamentary election =

Cantonal election in Bosnia and Herzegovina

- 12 October 2014
- All 23 seats in the Assembly of the West Herzegovina Canton; 12 seats needed for a majority
- Turnout: 51.11% (▼5.41 pp)
Party	Leader	Vote %	Seats	+/–
HDZ BiH–HSS–HKDU–HSP Herzeg-Bosnia	Zdenko Ćosić	56.56	14	+1
HDZ 1990	Velimir Bušić	15.07	4	0
HSP BiH–DSI	Stanko Primorac	6.60	2	−1
NSRzB	Žarko Karačić	5.61	1	−2
HSP Dr. AS BiH	Marija Ćeškić	4.48	1	+1
Croatian Union HKDU–Hrast	Deni Ćorić	3.26	1	New
This lists parties that won seats. See the complete results below.
Prime Minister before	Prime Minister after
Zdenko Ćosić; HDZ BiH	Zdenko Ćosić; HDZ BiH

The 2014 West Herzegovina parliamentary election was held on 12 October 2014 to elect all 23 members of the Assembly of the West Herzegovina Canton in West Herzegovina Canton, one of the ten cantons of the Federation of Bosnia and Herzegovina. It was part of the 2014 Bosnian general election.

The HDZ BiH-led coalition won 14 of the 23 seats, retaining an absolute majority. HDZ 1990 won four seats, the HSP BiH–DSI coalition two, and NSRzB, HSP Dr. AS BiH and the Croatian Union HKDU–Hrast one each.

== Results ==
13 lists contested the election. There were 33,958 valid votes and 1,751 invalid ballots. The results were certified on 10 November 2014. Percentages are rounded to two decimal places.

Final results
Party or alliance	Votes	%	Seats	Change from 2010 (Note: The HDZ BiH-led coalition is compared with HDZ BiH in 2010, and the HSP BiH–DSI coalition with HSP BiH. Other lists are compared with the corresponding parties in 2010; the Croatian Union HKDU–Hrast is compared with zero seats.)
HDZ BiH–HSS–HKDU–HSP Herzeg-Bosnia	19,208	56.56	14	+1
HDZ 1990	5,117	15.07	4	0
HSP BiH–DSI	2,240	6.60	2	−1
NSRzB	1,906	5.61	1	−2
HSP Dr. AS BiH	1,521	4.48	1	+1
Croatian Union HKDU–Hrast	1,108	3.26	1	+1
Together for Change (SPP–SP/U BiH–SDU–DNZ–LDS	825	2.43	0	0
HRS	802	2.36	0	0
SDP BiH	617	1.82	0	0
HNL	573	1.69	0	0
HSS SR	20	0.06	0	0
BNS	12	0.04	0	0
PS	9	0.03	0	0
Total	33,958	100.00	23	0
Sources: Central Election Commission of Bosnia and Herzegovina; Agency for Statistics of Bosnia and Herzegovina.

Ballot totals and turnout
Ballot category	Number	% of ballots cast
Valid votes	33,958	95.10
Invalid votes, excluding blank ballots	951	2.66
Blank ballots	800	2.24
Total ballots cast	35,709	100.00
Registered voters	69,864	—
Turnout	51.11% (▼5.41 pp)	
Source: Central Election Commission of Bosnia and Herzegovina.

Valid votes by voting method
Voting method	Valid votes	% of valid votes
Regular	33,634	99.05
Postal	173	0.51
Absentee, mobile team and diplomatic/consular	144	0.42
Tendered	7	0.02
Total	33,958	100.00
Source: Central Election Commission of Bosnia and Herzegovina.

== Government formation ==
On 4 February 2015, the Assembly confirmed a new government headed by incumbent prime minister Zdenko Ćosić.
