= 2014 Canton 10 parliamentary election =

Cantonal election in Bosnia and Herzegovina

- 12 October 2014
- All 25 seats in the Assembly of Canton 10; 13 seats needed for a majority
- Turnout: 48.97% (▼3.64 pp)
Party	Leader	Vote %	Seats	+/–
HDZ BiH–HSS–HKDU–HSP Herzeg-Bosnia	Branko Ivković	30.57	9	+2
HDZ 1990	Nediljko Rimac	15.16	4	0
SNSD		11.81	3	0
HNL	Josip Perić	7.71	2	New
SDA	Jasenko Tufekčić	7.23	2	0
NSRzB	Ivica Matković	5.90	2	−1
HSP BiH–HSS SR	Ivan Milić	5.55	2	−1
SDP BiH	Krunoslav Vrdoljak	4.40	1	0
This lists parties that won seats. See the complete results below.
Prime Minister before	Prime Minister after
Branko Ivković; HDZ BiH	Draško Dalić; HDZ BiH

The 2014 Canton 10 parliamentary election was held on 12 October 2014 to elect all 25 members of the Assembly of Canton 10 in Canton 10, one of the ten cantons of the Federation of Bosnia and Herzegovina. It was part of the 2014 Bosnian general election.

The HDZ BiH-led coalition was the largest list, winning nine of the 25 seats. HDZ 1990 won four seats and SNSD three. HNL, SDA, NSRzB and the HSP BiH–HSS SR coalition won two seats each, while SDP BiH won one.

== Results ==
20 lists contested the election. There were 29,673 valid votes and 1,791 invalid ballots. The results were certified on 10 November 2014. Percentages are rounded to two decimal places.

Final results
Party or alliance	Votes	%	Seats	Change from 2010 (Note: The HDZ BiH-led coalition is compared with HDZ BiH in 2010, and the HSP BiH–HSS SR coalition with HSP BiH. HNL is a new list and is compared with zero seats. HSS–NHI, which won one seat in 2010, is shown separately because it did not contest under that name in 2014.)
HDZ BiH–HSS–HKDU–HSP Herzeg-Bosnia	9,070	30.57	9	+2
HDZ 1990	4,497	15.16	4	0
SNSD	3,503	11.81	3	0
HNL	2,287	7.71	2	+2
SDA	2,144	7.23	2	0
NSRzB	1,750	5.90	2	−1
HSP BiH–HSS SR	1,646	5.55	2	−1
SDP BiH	1,306	4.40	1	0
DNS	671	2.26	0	−1
HSP Dr. AS BiH	576	1.94	0	0
SP	500	1.69	0	0
DF	450	1.52	0	0
SNS	343	1.16	0	0
DOS	331	1.12	0	0
SBB BiH	244	0.82	0	0
Together for Change (SPP–SP/U BiH–SDU–DNZ–LDS	194	0.65	0	0
SBiH	130	0.44	0	0
BNS	18	0.06	0	0
DSI	11	0.04	0	0
PS	2	0.01	0	0
Total	29,673	100.00	25	0
Sources: Central Election Commission of Bosnia and Herzegovina; Agency for Statistics of Bosnia and Herzegovina.

Ballot totals and turnout
Ballot category	Number	% of ballots cast
Valid votes	29,673	94.31
Invalid votes, excluding blank ballots	1,083	3.44
Blank ballots	708	2.25
Total ballots cast	31,464	100.00
Registered voters	64,248	—
Turnout	48.97% (▼3.64 pp)	
Source: Central Election Commission of Bosnia and Herzegovina.

Valid votes by voting method
Voting method	Valid votes	% of valid votes
Regular	28,495	96.03
Postal	767	2.58
Absentee, mobile team and diplomatic/consular	399	1.34
Tendered	12	0.04
Total	29,673	100.00
Source: Central Election Commission of Bosnia and Herzegovina.

== Government formation ==
On 5 May 2015, the Assembly confirmed a new government headed by Draško Dalić, succeeding Branko Ivković. The government consisted of HDZ BiH, SDA and SNSD.
