= 2002 Republika Srpska general election =

- 5 October 2002
- Presidential election
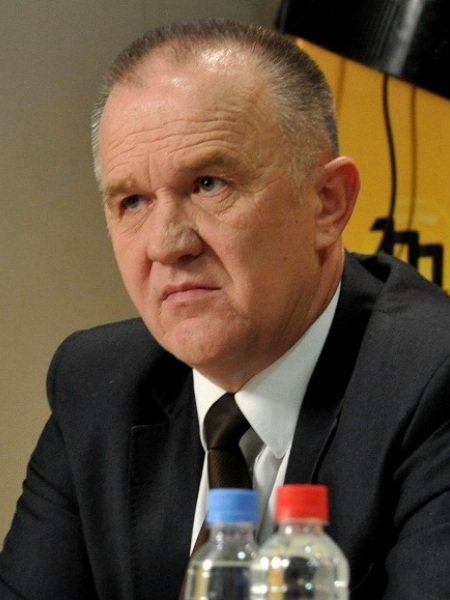

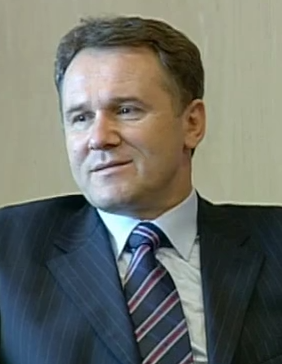
Candidate	Dragan Čavić	Milan Jelić
Party	SDS	SNSD
Popular vote	183,121	112,612
Percentage	35.89%	22.07%
President before election
Mirko Šarović
SDS
Elected President
Dragan Čavić
SDS
- National Assembly election
- 83 seats in the National Assembly; 42 seats needed for a majority
Party	Leader	Vote %	Seats	+/–
SDS	Dragan Kalinić	31.19	26	−5
SNSD	Milorad Dodik	21.79	19	+8
PDP	Mladen Ivanić	10.73	9	−2
SDA	Sulejman Tihić	7.10	6	0
SRS RS	Radislav Kanjerić	4.39	4	+4
SP	Petar Đokić	4.21	3	−1
DNS	Dragan Kostić	3.99	3	0
SBiH	Haris Silajdžić	3.65	4	0
SDP BiH	Zlatko Lagumdžija	3.38	3	−1
PS RS		1.77	1	New
SNP		1.26	1	New
SNS	Biljana Plavšić	0.98	1	−1
DPS		0.93	1	−1
DS		0.85	1	0
NHI	Krešimir Zubak	0.61	1	0
This lists parties that won seats. See the complete results below.
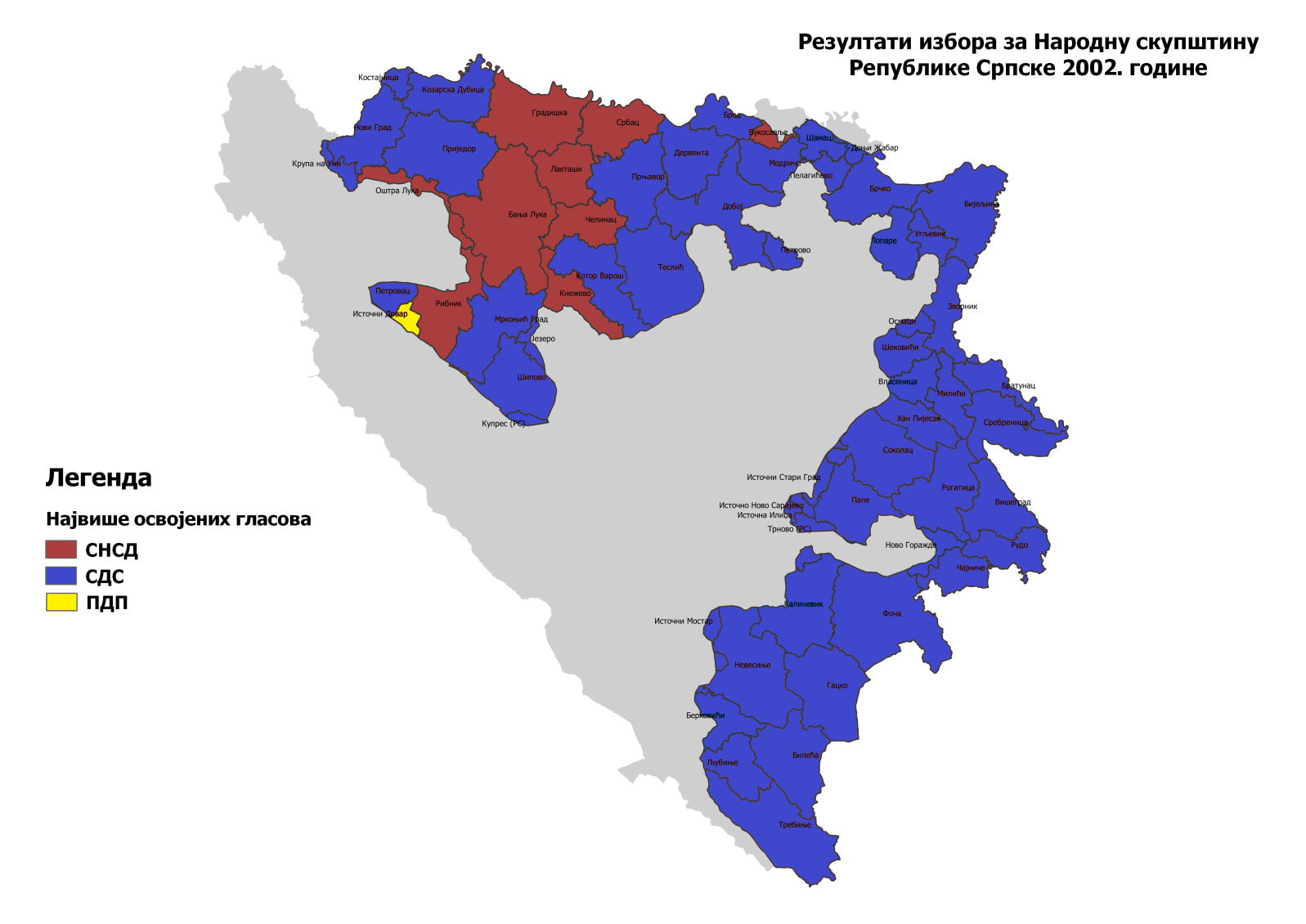
Most voted-for party by municipality
Prime Minister before	Prime Minister after
Mladen Ivanić; PDP	Dragan Mikerević; PDP

General elections were held in Republika Srpska on 5 October 2002, as part of the general elections across Bosnia and Herzegovina. Dragan Čavić of the Serb Democratic Party was elected president.

As of 2025, This was the most recent Presidential election that the Serb Democratic Party or any other party other than Alliance of Independent Social Democrats won.

== Results ==
=== President ===
Candidate	Party	Votes	%
Dragan Čavić	Serb Democratic Party	183,121	35.89
Milan Jelić	Alliance of Independent Social Democrats	112,612	22.07
Dragan Mikerević	Party of Democratic Progress	39,978	7.83
Adil Osmanović	Party of Democratic Action	34,129	6.69
Dragan Kostić	Democratic People's Alliance	31,401	6.15
Petar Đokić	Socialist Party	27,137	5.32
Radislav Kanjerić	Serbian Radical Party	19,187	3.76
Mirsad Đapo	Social Democratic Party	16,176	3.17
Smail Ibrahimpašić	Party for Bosnia and Herzegovina	14,252	2.79
Branislav Lolić	Serb National Alliance	4,689	0.92
Ivan Tomljenović	Social Democratic Party	4,027	0.79
Željko Matić	Coalition (HDZ–HD–HNZ–HKDU)	3,792	0.74
Miroslav Cabo	National Alliance for Revival	3,250	0.64
Atif Gredelj	Workers' Party	2,557	0.50
Radmilo Kondić	Social Democratic Centre Party	2,007	0.39
Ibran Mustafić	Radical Conservative Party	1,731	0.34
Muharem Insanić	Civic Democratic Party	1,693	0.33
Đurađ Davidović	National Party of Socialists	1,574	0.31
Izet Nakičević	Bosnian-Herzegovinian Patriotic Party	1,330	0.26
Abdulah Ahmić	Bosnian Drina People's Party	1,221	0.24
Fatima Kararić	Democratic People's Union	1,186	0.23
Slobodan Cvijetić	Independent	1,157	0.23
Vesna Jović-Vukadin	National Party of Socialists	1,029	0.20
Miro Mlađenović	Republican Alliance	1,027	0.20
Total		510,263	100.00
Valid votes		510,263	94.74
Invalid/blank votes		28,315	5.26
Total votes		538,578	100.00
Source: Central Elections Committee

=== National Assembly ===
Party	Votes	%	Seats
Serb Democratic Party	159,164	31.19	26
Alliance of Independent Social Democrats	111,226	21.79	19
Party of Democratic Progress	54,756	10.73	9
Party of Democratic Action	36,212	7.10	6
Serbian Radical Party	22,396	4.39	4
Socialist Party	21,502	4.21	3
Democratic People's Alliance	20,375	3.99	3
Party for Bosnia and Herzegovina	18,624	3.65	4
Social Democratic Party	17,227	3.38	3
Pensioners' Party	9,019	1.77	1
National Alliance for Revival	6,449	1.26	1
Serb National Alliance	4,992	0.98	1
Democratic Patriotic Party	4,730	0.93	1
Democratic Party	4,343	0.85	1
New Croatian Initiative	3,109	0.61	1
Peasant Party	2,744	0.54	0
Coalition (HDZ–HD–HNZ–HKDU)	2,126	0.42	0
National Party of Socialists	1,874	0.37	0
Foreign Currency Savings Party	1,572	0.31	0
Social Democratic Centre Party	1,443	0.28	0
Bosnian-Herzegovinian Patriotic Party	1,053	0.21	0
Bosnian Party	939	0.18	0
Civic Democratic Party	817	0.16	0
PROENS–SMBiH	621	0.12	0
Economic Bloc	384	0.08	0
Democratic People's Union	360	0.07	0
Bosniak Party of Rights	355	0.07	0
Bosnian Drina People's Party	312	0.06	0
Republican Alliance	299	0.06	0
Bosnian National Party	283	0.06	0
Democratic Development Party	205	0.04	0
National Front Party	154	0.03	0
Women's Party	149	0.03	0
Zavichajni Socijaldemokrati	148	0.03	0
Workers' Party	131	0.03	0
Republican Party	124	0.02	0
Radical Conservative Party	85	0.02	0
Liberal Democratic Party	75	0.01	0
Total	510,377	100.00	83
Valid votes	510,377	94.79	
Invalid/blank votes	28,076	5.21	
Total votes	538,453	100.00	
Source: Central Elections Committee
