= 2002 Bosnian general election =

- 5 October 2002
- Turnout: 55.45% (presidential) ▼12.42pp 55.46% (parliamentary) ▼8.94pp
- Bosniak member of the Presidency
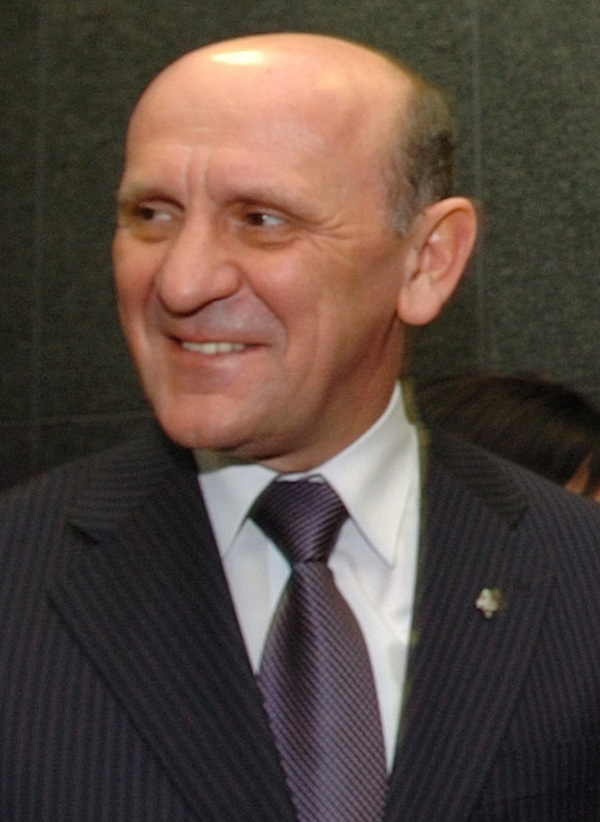

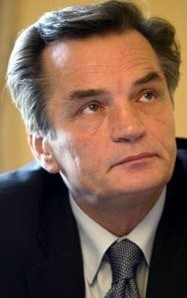
Candidate	Sulejman Tihić	Haris Silajdžić
Party	SDA	SBiH
Popular vote	192,661	179,726
Percentage	37.29%	34.79%
- Croat member of the Presidency
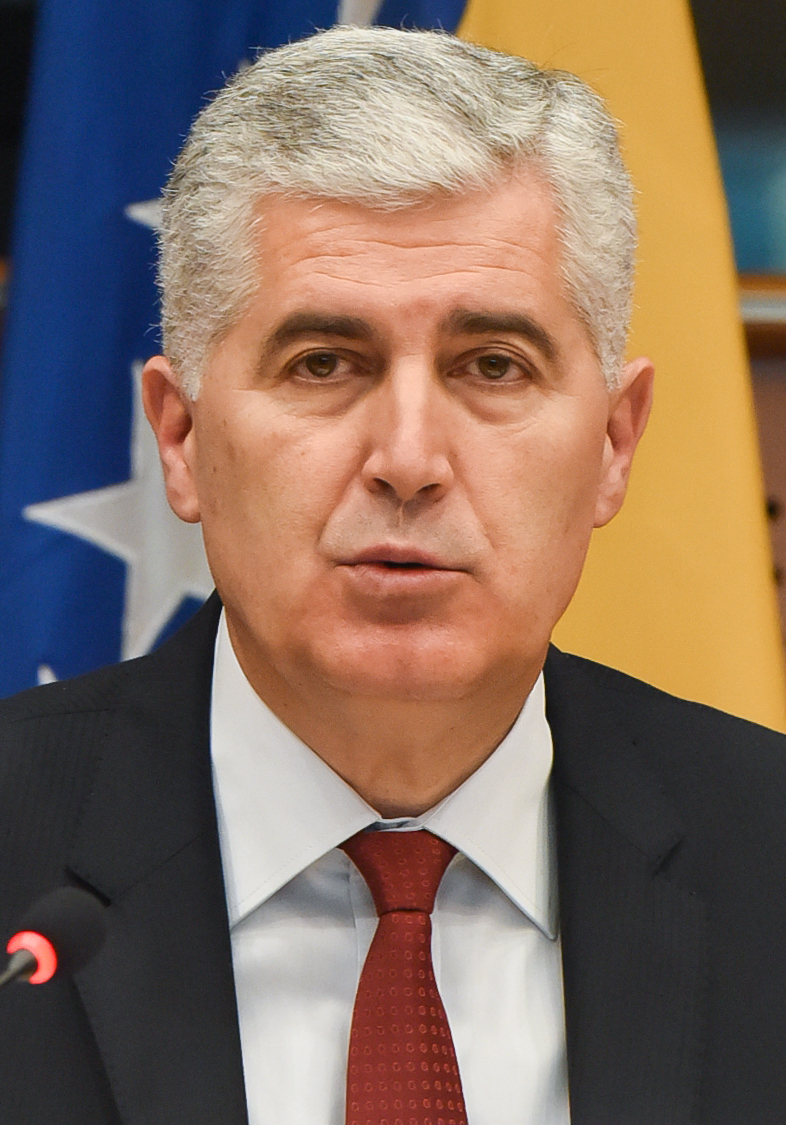
Candidate	Dragan Čović	Mladen Ivanković-Lijanović
Party	HDZ BiH	Economic Bloc
Popular vote	114,606	32,411
Percentage	61.52%	17.40%
- Serb member of the Presidency
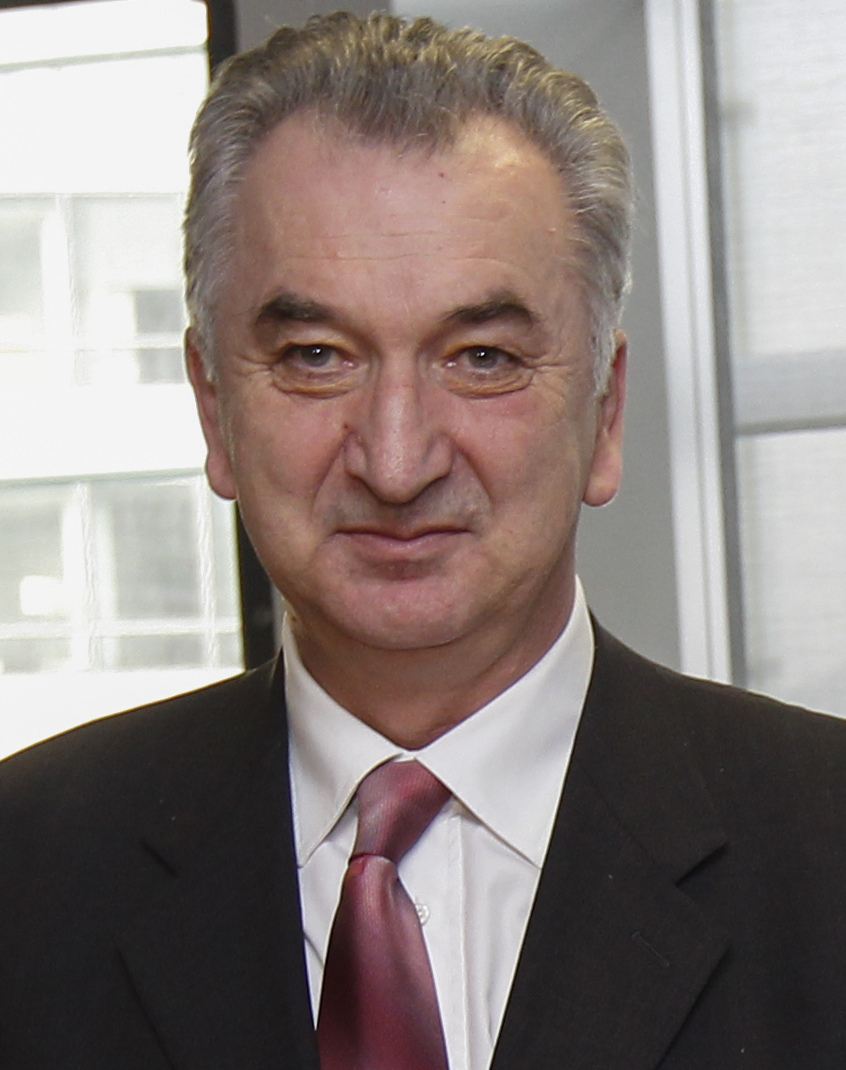

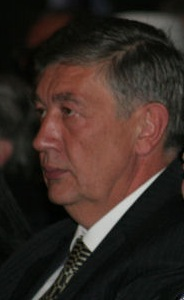
Candidate	Mirko Šarović	Nebojša Radmanović
Party	SDS	SNSD
Popular vote	180,212	101,119
Percentage	35.52%	19.93%
Presidency members before election
Beriz Belkić (Bosniak)
Jozo Križanović (Croat)
Živko Radišić (Serb)
Elected Presidency members
Sulejman Tihić (Bosniak)
Dragan Čović (Croat)
Mirko Šarović (Serb)
- House of Representatives
- All 42 seats in the House of Representatives; 22 seats needed for a majority
Party	Leader	Vote %	Seats	+/–
SDA	Sulejman Tihić	21.92	10	+2
SDS	Dragan Kalinić	14.04	5	−1
SBiH	Haris Silajdžić	11.07	6	+1
SDP BiH	Zlatko Lagumdžija	10.43	4	−5
SNSD	Milorad Dodik	9.80	3	+2
HDZ–HD	Bariša Čolak	9.48	5	0
PDP	Mladen Ivanić	4.61	2	0
SRS RS	Milanko Mihajlica	2.00	1	New
SP	Petar Đokić	1.91	1	0
BP	Mirnes Ajanović	1.54	1	New
SPU BiH	Muhamed Altić	1.43	1	New
DNZ	Fikret Abdić	1.39	1	0
NHI	Krešimir Zubak	1.37	1	0
EB	Mladen Ivanković-Lijanović	1.33	1	New
This lists parties that won seats. See the complete results below.
Chairman before	Chairman after
Dragan Mikerević; PDP	Adnan Terzić; SDA

General elections were held in Bosnia and Herzegovina on 5 October 2002. Voter turnout was 55%.

The elections for the House of Representatives were divided into two; one for the Federation of Bosnia and Herzegovina and one for Republika Srpska. In the presidential election, voters in the Federation elected Bosniak Sulejman Tihić and Croat Dragan Čović, while voters in Republika Srpska elected Serb Mirko Šarović. The Party of Democratic Action emerged as the largest party in the House of Representatives, winning 10 of the 42 seats.

== Electoral system ==
Voters elected 42 members to the national House of Representatives. In the Federation of Bosnia and Herzegovina, 98 members to its Federal House of Representatives, two representatives (one Bosniak and one Croat) to the tripartite state Presidency and ten cantonal assemblies were elected. In Republika Srpska (RS), 83 members to its National Assembly, the Serb representative of the tripartite state Presidency, one RS president and two RS vice-presidents were elected. There were 39 political parties, 11 coalitions, and 13 independent candidates. Voter turnout was 55%.

== Results ==
The elections for the House of Representatives were divided into two; one for the Federation of Bosnia and Herzegovina and one for Republika Srpska. In the presidential election, each of the three national communities elected a Presidency member. Bosniaks elected Sulejman Tihić, Croats elected Dragan Čović and Serbs elected Mirko Šarović.

=== Presidency ===
Candidate	Party	Votes	%
Bosniak member
Sulejman Tihić	Party of Democratic Action	192,661	37.29
Haris Silajdžić	Party for Bosnia and Herzegovina	179,726	34.79
Alija Behmen	Social Democratic Party	90,434	17.51
Fikret Abdić	Democratic People's Union	21,164	4.10
Faruk Balijagić	Bosnian Party	9,650	1.87
Emir Zlatar	Bosnian-Herzegovinian Patriotic Party	6,500	1.26
Rasim Kadić	Liberal Democratic Party	5,360	1.04
Adem Mujčić	Workers' Party	4,940	0.96
Ibrahim Spahić	Civic Democratic Party	3,062	0.59
Asim Ibrahimpašić	Bosniak Party of Rights	2,026	0.39
Bakir Tanović	People's Bosniak Party	1,087	0.21
Total		516,610	100.00
Croat member
Dragan Čović	Croatian Democratic Union	114,606	61.52
Mladen Ivanković-Lijanović	Economic Bloc	32,411	17.40
Mijo Anić	New Croatian Initiative	16,345	8.77
Stjepan Kljuić	Republican Party	9,413	5.05
Željko Koroman	Croatian Right Bloc	5,255	2.82
Žarko Mišić	Croatian Christian Democratic Union	5,142	2.76
Marinko Brkić	Independent	2,154	1.16
Karmela Osmanović	Civic Democratic Party	965	0.52
Total		186,291	100.00
Serb member
Mirko Šarović	Serb Democratic Party	180,212	35.52
Nebojša Radmanović	Alliance of Independent Social Democrats	101,119	19.93
Ognjen Tadić	Serbian Radical Party	44,262	8.72
Desnica Radivojević	Party of Democratic Action	41,667	8.21
Branko Dokić	Party of Democratic Progress	41,228	8.13
Mirko Banjac	National Alliance for Revival	23,238	4.58
Mladen Grahovac	Social Democratic Party	22,852	4.50
Dragutin Ilić	Socialist Party	18,533	3.65
Milorad Đokić	Democratic People's Alliance	16,129	3.18
Svetozar Mihajlović	Serb National Alliance	5,143	1.01
Ranko Bajić	Social Democratic Centre Party	3,231	0.64
Dušan Bajić	Democratic People's Union	2,790	0.55
Aleksander Rajlić	Civic Democratic Party	2,625	0.52
Tomislav Taušan	National Party of Socialists	1,875	0.37
Borislav Vasić	Foreign Currency Savings Party	1,570	0.31
Radovan Simić	Party of Democratic Development	940	0.19
Total		507,414	100.00
Valid votes		1,210,315	93.19
Invalid/blank votes		88,496	6.81
Total votes		1,298,811	100.00
Registered voters/turnout		2,342,141	55.45
Source: Nohlen & Stöver, CEC

=== House of Representatives ===
Party	Votes	%	Seats
Party of Democratic Action	269,427	21.92	10
Serb Democratic Party	172,544	14.04	5
Party for Bosnia and Herzegovina	136,090	11.07	6
Social Democratic Party	128,212	10.43	4
Alliance of Independent Social Democrats	120,376	9.80	3
Croatian Democratic Union–HD	116,452	9.48	5
Party of Democratic Progress	56,643	4.61	2
Serbian Radical Party	24,559	2.00	1
Socialist Party	23,533	1.91	1
Bosnian Party	18,868	1.54	1
Pensioners' Party	17,588	1.43	1
Democratic People's Alliance	17,432	1.42	0
Democratic People's Union	17,106	1.39	1
New Croatian Initiative	16,890	1.37	1
Economic Bloc	16,336	1.33	1
Bosnian-Herzegovinian Patriotic Party	10,585	0.86	0
National Alliance for Revival	9,591	0.78	0
Croatian Peasant Party	6,872	0.56	0
Croatian Christian Democratic Union	6,396	0.52	0
Croatian Right Bloc	5,262	0.43	0
Liberal Democratic Party	5,255	0.43	0
Civic Democratic Party	4,644	0.38	0
Serb National Alliance	4,410	0.36	0
Pro-European People's Party	4,113	0.33	0
People's Bosniak Party	3,176	0.26	0
Democratic Party of Republika Srpska	3,111	0.25	0
Republican Party	2,854	0.23	0
Foreign Currency Savings Party	2,358	0.19	0
National Party of Socialists	2,338	0.19	0
Social Democratic Centre Party	2,296	0.19	0
Workers' Party	1,810	0.15	0
Bosniak Party of Rights	1,528	0.12	0
Democratic Development Party	268	0.02	0
Total	1,228,923	100.00	42
Valid votes	1,228,923	94.60	
Invalid/blank votes	70,098	5.40	
Total votes	1,299,021	100.00	
Registered voters/turnout	2,342,141	55.46	
Source: Nohlen & Stöver, CEC, CEC

==== By entity ====
Party	Federation			Republika Srpska			Total seats
Party	Votes	%	Seats	Votes	%	Seats	Total seats
Party of Democratic Action	232,325	32.40	9	37,102	7.25	1	10
Serb Democratic Party				172,544	33.71	5	5
Party for Bosnia and Herzegovina	116,114	16.19	5	19,976	3.90	1	6
Social Democratic Party	112,258	15.65	4	15,954	3.12	0	4
Alliance of Independent Social Democrats	5,785	0.81	0	114,591	22.39	3	3
Croatian Democratic Union–HD	114,207	15.93	5	2,245	0.44	0	5
Party of Democratic Progress	3,466	0.48	0	53,177	10.39	2	2
Serbian Radical Party				24,559	4.80	1	1
Socialist Party	1,407	0.20	0	22,126	4.32	1	1
Bosnian Party	18,411	2.57	1	457	0.09	0	1
Pensioners' Party	17,588	2.45	1				1
Democratic People's Alliance				17,432	3.41	0	0
Democratic People's Union	16,454	2.29	1	652	0.13	0	1
New Croatian Initiative	13,820	1.93	1	3,070	0.60	0	1
Economic Bloc	16,052	2.24	1	284	0.06	0	1
Bosnian-Herzegovinian Patriotic Party	9,477	1.32	0	1,108	0.22	0	0
National Alliance for Revival	498	0.07	0	9,093	1.78	0	0
Croatian Peasant Party	5,930	0.83	0	942	0.18	0	0
Croatian Christian Democratic Union	6,396	0.89	0				0
Croatian Right Bloc	5,262	0.73	0				0
Liberal Democratic Party	5,113	0.71	0	142	0.03	0	0
Civic Democratic Party	3,422	0.48	0	1,222	0.24	0	0
Serb National Alliance				4,410	0.86	0	0
Pro-European People's Party	3,500	0.49	0	613	0.12	0	0
People's Bosniak Party	3,176	0.44	0				0
Democratic Party of Republika Srpska				3,111	0.61	0	0
Republican Party	2,854	0.40	0				0
Foreign Currency Savings Party	271	0.04	0	2,087	0.41	0	0
People's Party of Socialists				2,338	0.46	0	0
Social Democratic Centre Party				2,296	0.45	0	0
Workers' Party	1,810	0.25	0				0
Bosniak Party of Rights	1,528	0.21	0				0
Democratic Development Party				268	0.05	0	0
Total	717,124	100.00	28	511,799	100.00	14	42
Valid votes	717,124	94.30		511,799	95.03		
Invalid/blank votes	43,308	5.70		26,790	4.97		
Total votes	760,432	100.00		538,589	100.00		
Source: Nohlen & Stöver, CEC, CEC

== See also ==
- 2002 Republika Srpska general election
