= 2002 West Herzegovina parliamentary election =

Cantonal election in Bosnia and Herzegovina

- 5 October 2002
- All 23 seats in the Assembly of the West Herzegovina Canton; 12 seats needed for a majority
Party	Leader	Vote %	Seats	+/–
HDZ BiH–HDU–HNZ (Note: The HDZ BiH–HDU–HNZ coalition is compared with the 15 seats allocated to HDZ BiH in 2000. NSRzB is compared with the two seats won by the Radom za boljitak list in 2000. The 2000 HKDP and Nezavisni pravaši lists are shown separately; no equivalence with another list is assumed.)	Anđelko Mikulić	68.32	18	+3
NSRzB	Marinko Ivanković	7.45	2	0
HSP	Zvonko Jurišić	5.56	1	0
HPB	Branko Ćorluka	5.55	1	+1
HKDU BiH	Mirko Širić	5.43	1	0
This lists parties that won seats. See the complete results below.
Prime Minister before	Prime Minister after
Anđelko Mikulić; HDZ BiH	Viktor Lasić; HDZ BiH

The 2002 West Herzegovina parliamentary election was held on 5 October 2002 to elect all 23 members of the Assembly of the West Herzegovina Canton in West Herzegovina Canton, one of the ten cantons of the Federation of Bosnia and Herzegovina. It was part of the 2002 Bosnian general election.

The coalition of the Croatian Democratic Union of Bosnia and Herzegovina (HDZ BiH), Croat Christian Democrats (HDU) and the Croatian National Union (HNZ) won 18 of the 23 seats. The People's Party Work for Prosperity (NSRzB) won two, while the Croatian Party of Rights (HSP), Hrvatski pravaški blok (HPB) and the Croatian Christian Democratic Union of Bosnia and Herzegovina (HKDU BiH) won one each.

== Results ==
15 lists contested the election. There were 26,327 valid votes and 944 invalid ballots. Vote shares are reproduced as reported and may not sum to 100%.

Seat changes are compared with the final allocation following the 2000 election, when the canton was allocated 21 seats. After the 2000 election, the Electoral Appeals Sub-Commission sanctioned HDZ BiH by stripping it of two mandates in each of five cantonal assemblies.

Final results
Party or alliance	Votes	%	Seats	Change from 2000
HDZ BiH–HDU–HNZ	17,986	68.32	18	+3
NSRzB	1,961	7.45	2	0
HSP	1,463	5.56	1	0
Croat Rights Bloc (HPB)	1,462	5.55	1	+1
HKDU BiH	1,430	5.43	1	0
HDU	718	2.73	0	0
HSS BiH	464	1.76	0	0
SDP BiH	238	0.90	0	0
NHI	206	0.78	0	0
SP/U BiH	203	0.77	0	0
SDA	90	0.34	0	0
PROENS	44	0.17	0	0
DCSJP BiH	39	0.15	0	0
GDS BiH	16	0.06	0	0
BOSS	7	0.03	0	0
HKDP	—	—	0	−1
NP	—	—	0	−1
Total	26,327	100.00	23	+2
Source: Central Election Commission of Bosnia and Herzegovina.

Ballot totals
Ballot category	Number	% of ballots cast
Valid votes	26,327	96.54
Invalid ballots	944	3.46
Total ballots cast	27,271	100.00
Source: Central Election Commission of Bosnia and Herzegovina.

Valid votes by voting method
Voting method	Valid votes	% of valid votes
Regular	25,888	98.33
Postal	287	1.09
Absentee	141	0.54
Tendered	11	0.04
Total	26,327	100.00
Source: Central Election Commission of Bosnia and Herzegovina.

== Government formation ==
Anđelko Mikulić headed the cantonal government at the time of the election. By March 2003, Viktor Lasić had become prime minister.
