= 2018 West Herzegovina parliamentary election =

Cantonal election in Bosnia and Herzegovina

- 7 October 2018
- All 23 seats in the Assembly of the West Herzegovina Canton; 12 seats needed for a majority
- Turnout: 51.60% (▲0.49 pp)
Party	Leader	Vote %	Seats	+/–
HDZ BiH–HKDU	Zdenko Ćosić	65.21	16	+2
Croat Unity (HDZ 1990–HS HKDU–Hrast–HNL)	Ante Pavlović	10.77	3	−2
HRS	Darko Kvesić	8.90	2	+2
HSP Dr. AS BiH–HDU	Marija Lovrić	5.22	1	0
HSP BiH	Zvonko Jurišić	3.65	1	−1
This lists parties that won seats. See the complete results below.
Prime Minister before	Prime Minister after
Zdenko Ćosić; HDZ BiH	Zdenko Ćosić; HDZ BiH

The 2018 West Herzegovina parliamentary election was held on 7 October 2018 to elect all 23 members of the Assembly of the West Herzegovina Canton in West Herzegovina Canton, one of the ten cantons of the Federation of Bosnia and Herzegovina. It was part of the 2018 Bosnian general election.

The HDZ BiH–HKDU coalition retained its absolute majority, winning 16 of the 23 seats, two more than the HDZ BiH-led list in 2014. Croat Unity won three seats, the Croatian Republican Party (HRS) won two, and the HSP Dr. AS BiH–HDU coalition and HSP BiH each won one.

== Results ==
Results were reported from all 119 polling stations (100.00%). 18 lists contested the election, with 181 candidates. There were 36,047 valid votes and 1,597 invalid ballots. The results were certified on 6 November 2018. Percentages are reproduced as reported; rounding may cause totals to differ from 100%.

Final results
Party or alliance	Votes	%	Seats	Change from 2014 (Note: The HDZ BiH–HKDU coalition is compared with the HDZ BiH-led coalition in 2014. Croat Unity is compared with the combined five seats won by HDZ 1990 (four) and the Croatian Union HKDU–Hrast (one). The HSP Dr. AS BiH–HDU coalition is compared with HSP Dr. AS BiH, and HSP BiH with the HSP BiH–DSI coalition.)
HDZ BiH–HKDU	23,508	65.21	16	+2
Croat Unity (HDZ 1990–HS HKDU–Hrast–HNL)	3,884	10.77	3	−2
HRS	3,208	8.90	2	+2
HSP Dr. AS BiH–HDU	1,882	5.22	1	0
HSP BiH	1,316	3.65	1	−1
HSP BiH (Stanko Primorac)	879	2.44	0	0
HSS	713	1.98	0	0
NSRzB	357	0.99	0	−1
SDP BiH	152	0.42	0	0
KP	30	0.08	0	0
SMS	22	0.06	0	0
HSS SR	19	0.05	0	0
LS BiH	17	0.05	0	0
NBL	16	0.04	0	0
PS	14	0.04	0	0
A-SDA	13	0.04	0	0
DNZ BiH	11	0.03	0	0
NB	6	0.02	0	0
Total	36,047	100.00	23	
Source: Central Election Commission of Bosnia and Herzegovina.

Ballot totals and turnout
Ballot category	Number	% of ballots cast
Valid votes	36,047	95.76
Invalid votes, excluding blank ballots	1,227	3.26
Blank ballots	370	0.98
Total ballots cast	37,644	100.00
Registered voters	72,947	—
Turnout	51.60%	
Source: Central Election Commission of Bosnia and Herzegovina.

Votes by voting method
Party or alliance	Regular	Postal	Absentee, mobile team and diplomatic/consular	Tendered	Total
HDZ BiH–HKDU	23,010	224	250	24	23,508
Croat Unity (HDZ 1990–HS HKDU–Hrast–HNL)	3,829	45	6	4	3,884
HRS	3,170	18	19	1	3,208
HSP Dr. AS BiH–HDU	1,804	72	1	5	1,882
HSP BiH	1,167	143	1	5	1,316
HSP BiH (Stanko Primroac)	857	21	0	1	879
HSS	706	5	1	1	713
NSRzB	348	7	2	0	357
SDP BiH	133	15	4	0	152
KP	28	1	0	1	30
SMS	22	0	0	0	22
HSS SR	19	0	0	0	19
LS BiH	17	0	0	0	17
NBL	11	4	1	0	16
PS	14	0	0	0	14
A-SDA	8	4	1	0	13
DNZ BiH	11	0	0	0	11
NB	6	0	0	0	6
Total	35,160	559	286	42	36,047
Source: Central Election Commission of Bosnia and Herzegovina.

== Government formation ==
On 17 December 2018, the Assembly confirmed a new government headed by incumbent prime minister Zdenko Ćosić. Two HRS representatives abstained.
