= 2018 Canton 10 parliamentary election =

Cantonal election in Bosnia and Herzegovina

- 7 October 2018
- All 25 seats in the Assembly of Canton 10; 13 seats needed for a majority
- Turnout: 44.77% (▼4.20 pp)
| Party | Leader | Vote % | Seats | +/– |
|---|---|---|---|---|
| HDZ BiH–HSS–HKDU–HSP Dr. AS BiH–HDU | Ivan Jozić | 30.69 | 8 | −1 |
| HDZ 1990 | Nediljko Rimac | 13.79 | 4 | 0 |
| Serb List (SNSD–DNS–SP) | Goran Broćeta | 12.10 | 3 | 0 |
| HNL | Josip Perić | 11.05 | 3 | +1 |
| SDA | Hikmet Hodžić | 7.21 | 2 | 0 |
| SNS | Duško Radun | 4.59 | 1 | +1 |
| NSRzB | Ivica Matković | 4.08 | 1 | −1 |
| HRS | Krešimir Tabak | 3.66 | 1 | +1 |
| ŽNL | Draško Dalić | 3.66 | 1 | New |
| SDP BiH | Jugoslav Brdar | 3.01 | 1 | 0 |
This lists parties that won seats. See the complete results below.
| Prime Minister before | Prime Minister after |
|---|---|
| Ivan Jozić; HDZ BiH | Ivan Vukadin; HNP |

The 2018 Canton 10 parliamentary election was held on 7 October 2018 to elect all 25 members of the Assembly of Canton 10 in Canton 10, one of the ten cantons of the Federation of Bosnia and Herzegovina. It was part of the 2018 Bosnian general election.

The HDZ BiH-led coalition received the most votes and won eight of the 25 seats, one fewer than in 2014. HDZ 1990 won four seats, while the Serb List and the Croatian Independent List (HNL) each won three.

== Results ==
Results were reported from all 107 polling stations (100.00%). 24 lists and two independent candidates contested the election, for a total of 319 candidates. There were 27,494 valid votes and 1,628 invalid ballots. The results were certified on 6 November 2018. Percentages are reproduced as reported; rounding may cause totals to differ from 100%.

Final results
| Party or alliance | Votes | % | Seats | Change from 2014 (Note: The HDZ BiH-led coalition is compared with the HDZ BiH-led coalition in 2014; the Serb List with SNSD, DNS and SP combined; and HSP BiH with the HSP BiH–HSS SR coalition. The Cantonal Independent List is a new electoral list, compared with zero seats.) |
|---|---|---|---|---|
| HDZ BiH–HSS–HKDU–HSP Dr. AS BiH–HDU | 8,438 | 30.69 | 8 | −1 |
| HDZ 1990 | 3,791 | 13.79 | 4 | 0 |
| Serb List (SNSD–DNS–SP) | 3,328 | 12.10 | 3 | 0 |
| HNL | 3,037 | 11.05 | 3 | +1 |
| SDA | 1,981 | 7.21 | 2 | 0 |
| SNS FBiH | 1,262 | 4.59 | 1 | +1 |
| NSRzB | 1,121 | 4.08 | 1 | −1 |
| HRS | 1,007 | 3.66 | 1 | +1 |
| ŽNL | 1,007 | 3.66 | 1 | +1 |
| SDP BiH | 827 | 3.01 | 1 | 0 |
| DOS–HLL | 545 | 1.98 | 0 | 0 |
| DF | 479 | 1.74 | 0 | 0 |
| HSP BiH (Stanko Primorac) | 414 | 1.51 | 0 | 0 |
| SBiH | 101 | 0.37 | 0 | 0 |
| HSP BiH | 41 | 0.15 | 0 | −2 |
| PSDS | 24 | 0.09 | 0 | 0 |
| KP | 20 | 0.07 | 0 | 0 |
| Croatian Union HKDU–Hrast | 17 | 0.06 | 0 | 0 |
| SMS | 12 | 0.04 | 0 | 0 |
| NB | 10 | 0.04 | 0 | 0 |
| LS BiH | 6 | 0.02 | 0 | 0 |
| HSS SR | 5 | 0.02 | 0 | 0 |
| NDP | 4 | 0.01 | 0 | 0 |
| NBL | 3 | 0.01 | 0 | 0 |
| Marko Zagorac (independent) | 9 | 0.03 | 0 | 0 |
| Anto Kasalo (independent) | 5 | 0.02 | 0 | 0 |
| Total | 27,494 | 100.00 | 25 | |
Source: Central Election Commission of Bosnia and Herzegovina.

Ballot totals and turnout
| Ballot category | Number | % of ballots cast |
|---|---|---|
| Valid votes | 27,494 | 94.41 |
| Invalid votes, excluding blank ballots | 947 | 3.25 |
| Blank ballots | 681 | 2.34 |
| Total ballots cast | 29,122 | 100.00 |
| Registered voters | 65,041 | — |
| Turnout | 44.77% | |
Source: Central Election Commission of Bosnia and Herzegovina.

Votes by voting method
| Party or alliance | Regular | Postal | Absentee, mobile team and diplomatic/consular | Tendered | Total |
|---|---|---|---|---|---|
| HDZ BiH–HSS–HKDU–HSP Dr. AS BiH–HDU | 7,208 | 1,115 | 101 | 14 | 8,438 |
| HDZ 1990 | 3,451 | 283 | 48 | 9 | 3,791 |
| Serb List (SNSD–DNS–SP) | 2,842 | 368 | 117 | 1 | 3,328 |
| HNL | 2,706 | 261 | 50 | 20 | 3,037 |
| SDA | 1,787 | 177 | 11 | 6 | 1,981 |
| SNS | 1,128 | 77 | 55 | 2 | 1,262 |
| NSRzB | 1,066 | 50 | 3 | 2 | 1,121 |
| HRS | 956 | 47 | 2 | 2 | 1,007 |
| ŽNL | 996 | 8 | 1 | 2 | 1,007 |
| SDP BiH | 780 | 36 | 6 | 5 | 827 |
| DOS–HLL | 527 | 14 | 4 | 0 | 545 |
| DF | 403 | 66 | 6 | 4 | 479 |
| HSP BiH (Stanko Primorac) | 404 | 10 | 0 | 0 | 414 |
| SBiH | 67 | 29 | 5 | 0 | 101 |
| HSP BiH | 39 | 2 | 0 | 0 | 41 |
| PSDS | 17 | 0 | 7 | 0 | 24 |
| KP | 20 | 0 | 0 | 0 | 20 |
| Croatian Union HKDU–Hrast | 15 | 2 | 0 | 0 | 17 |
| SMS | 10 | 0 | 2 | 0 | 12 |
| NB | 10 | 0 | 0 | 0 | 10 |
| Marko Zagorac (independent) | 9 | 0 | 0 | 0 | 9 |
| LS BiH | 6 | 0 | 0 | 0 | 6 |
| Anto Kasalo (independent) | 5 | 0 | 0 | 0 | 5 |
| HSS SR | 5 | 0 | 0 | 0 | 5 |
| NDP | 3 | 1 | 0 | 0 | 4 |
| NBL | 3 | 0 | 0 | 0 | 3 |
| Total | 24,463 | 2,546 | 418 | 67 | 27,494 |
Source: Central Election Commission of Bosnia and Herzegovina.

== Government formation ==
The outgoing government headed by Ivan Jozić remained in a caretaker capacity until 21 December 2020, when the Assembly confirmed a new government headed by Ivan Vukadin.
