= 2002 Canton 10 parliamentary election =

Cantonal election in Bosnia and Herzegovina

- 5 October 2002
- All 25 seats in the Assembly of Canton 10; 13 seats needed for a majority
Party	Leader	Vote %	Seats	+/–
HDZ BiH–HDU–HNZ (Note: The HDZ BiH–HDU–HNZ coalition is compared with the 12 seats allocated to HDZ BiH in 2000.)	Mato Franjičević	47.13	13	+1
SNSD	Vlatko Zrilić	10.00	3	+1
SDA	Jasenko Tufekčić	6.70	2	0
HKDU BiH	Jozo Sliško	6.64	2	+1
NSRzB	Ivica Matković	6.21	2	+2
HSP	Ivan Miloloža	3.51	1	0
SBiH	Ale Kamber	3.45	1	0
SDP BiH	Krunoslav Vrdoljak	3.15	1	0
This lists parties that won seats. See the complete results below.
Prime Minister after
Stipo Pelivan; HDZ BiH

The 2002 Canton 10 parliamentary election was held on 5 October 2002 to elect all 25 members of the Assembly of Canton 10 in Canton 10, one of the ten cantons of the Federation of Bosnia and Herzegovina. It was part of the 2002 Bosnian general election.

The coalition of the Croatian Democratic Union of Bosnia and Herzegovina (HDZ BiH), Croat Christian Democrats (HDU) and the Croatian National Union (HNZ) won 13 of the 25 seats, securing an absolute majority. The Alliance of Independent Social Democrats (SNSD) won three seats; the Party of Democratic Action (SDA), the Croatian Christian Democratic Union of Bosnia and Herzegovina (HKDU BiH) and the People's Party Work for Prosperity (NSRzB) won two each; and the Croatian Party of Rights (HSP), the Party for Bosnia and Herzegovina (SBiH) and the Social Democratic Party of Bosnia and Herzegovina (SDP BiH) won one each.

== Results ==
21 lists contested the election. There were 28,340 valid votes and 1,362 invalid ballots.

Seat changes are compared with the final allocation following the 2000 election, when the canton was allocated 23 seats. After the 2000 election, the Electoral Appeals Sub-Commission sanctioned HDZ BiH by stripping it of two mandates in each of five cantonal assemblies.

Final results
Party or alliance	Votes	%	Seats	Change from 2000
HDZ BiH–HDU–HNZ	13,356	47.13	13	+1
SNSD	2,834	10.00	3	+1
SDA	1,898	6.70	2	0
HKDU BiH	1,883	6.64	2	+1
NSRzB	1,760	6.21	2	+2
HSP	995	3.51	1	0
SBiH	979	3.45	1	0
SDP BiH	894	3.15	1	0
ZSD	679	2.40	0	−1
HPB	609	2.15	0	0
PDP	514	1.81	0	0
SP	508	1.79	0	−1
HSS BiH	486	1.71	0	−1
HDU	301	1.06	0	0
NHI	220	0.78	0	0
PROENS	124	0.44	0	0
SP/U BiH	90	0.32	0	0
DNZ BiH	88	0.31	0	0
SS	80	0.28	0	0
DPS RS	29	0.10	0	0
GDS BiH	13	0.05	0	0
Total	28,340	100.00	25	
Source: Central Election Commission of Bosnia and Herzegovina.

Ballot totals
Ballot category	Number	% of ballots cast
Valid votes	28,340	95.41
Invalid ballots	1,362	4.59
Total ballots cast	29,702	100.00
Source: Central Election Commission of Bosnia and Herzegovina.

Valid votes by voting method
Voting method	Valid votes	% of valid votes
Regular	26,319	92.87
Postal	1,148	4.05
Absentee	616	2.17
Tendered	257	0.91
Total	28,340	100.00
Source: Central Election Commission of Bosnia and Herzegovina.

== Government formation ==
Prime Minister Anto Omazić had been dismissed on 20 September 2002, before the election. The Assembly verified the mandates of all 25 elected members on 3 December 2002. On 19 March 2003, it confirmed a new government headed by Stipo Pelivan.
