= 2000 West Herzegovina parliamentary election =

Cantonal election in Bosnia and Herzegovina

- 11 November 2000
- All 23 seats in the Assembly of the West Herzegovina Canton (Note: Two HDZ BiH mandates were withheld following an EASC decision and remained vacant. 21 mandates were therefore allocated. The seats-for-election and majority figures refer to the full 23-seat assembly.); 12 seats needed for a majority
Party	Leader	Vote %	Seats	+/–
HDZ BiH (Note: Seat changes compare electoral lists. The 1998 NHI–HKDU coalition is shown separately from NHI and HKDU BiH, which contested the 2000 election separately.)	Anđelko Mikulić	70.7	15	−11
NSRzB	Mladen Ivanković	8.1	2	+2
HSP	Zdravko Hrstić	4.7	1	−2
HKDP	Jure Rupčić	3.4	1	0
HKDU BiH	Mladen Kraljević	3.4	1	+1
NP	Borislav Šimunović	2.5	1	+1
This lists parties that won seats. See the complete results below.
Prime Minister before	Prime Minister after
Anđelko Mikulić; HDZ BiH	Anđelko Mikulić; HDZ BiH

The 2000 West Herzegovina parliamentary election was held on 11 November 2000 to elect members of the Assembly of the West Herzegovina Canton in West Herzegovina Canton, one of the ten cantons of the Federation of Bosnia and Herzegovina. It was part of the 2000 Bosnian parliamentary election.

The Croatian Democratic Union of Bosnia and Herzegovina (HDZ BiH) received 70.7% of valid votes. In the final allocation, HDZ BiH held 15 seats, Radom za boljitak held two, and four other lists held one each. Two seats remained vacant.

== Results ==
The published candidate lists included 15 lists and 218 names. The recorded valid vote total was 28,837. Vote shares below follow the archived OSCE results and are reported to one decimal place.

On 15 November 2000, the Election Appeals Sub-Commission (EASC) sanctioned HDZ BiH for supporting a referendum during the election silence period. It struck the two HDZ candidates with the most votes in each of five cantonal assemblies, including this canton. Their mandates could not be reallocated and remained vacant.

The table shows the 21 mandates allocated after those sanctions, compared with the 31 mandates recorded for the canton in the 1998 seat chart.

Final results
Party or list	Votes	%	Seats	Change from 1998
HDZ BiH	20,388	70.7	15	−11
NSRzB	2,326	8.1	2	+2
HSP	1,366	4.7	1	−2
HKDP	981	3.4	1	0
HKDU BiH	977	3.4	1	+1
NP	712	2.5	1	+1
SDP BiH	412	1.4	0	0
UHSP BiH	406	1.4	0	0
HDK	381	1.3	0	0
HSS BiH	305	1.1	0	0
SDA	221	0.8	0	0
HNZ	179	0.6	0	0
NHI	110	0.4	0	0
HNS BiH	60	0.2	0	0
DCSJP BiH	13	0.0	0	0
Total	28,837	100.0	21	
Source: Central Election Commission of Bosnia and Herzegovina (archived OSCE results).

Seat allocation
Category	Seats
Mandates allocated	21
Mandates withheld and left vacant	2
Total seats	23
Sources: Central Election Commission of Bosnia and Herzegovina and the OSCE Mission to Bosnia and Herzegovina.

Valid votes by voting origin
Voting origin	Valid votes	% of valid votes
In municipality	27,496	95.35
Out of municipality	1,341	4.65
Total	28,837	100.00
Source: Central Election Commission of Bosnia and Herzegovina (archived OSCE results).

== Government formation ==
Anđelko Mikulić headed the cantonal government before the election and remained prime minister during the following legislative term.
