= Purić =

Purić (Serbian Cyrillic: Пурић) is a South Slavic surname. Notable people with the surname include:

- Aleksa Purić, Serbian footballer
- Božidar Purić, Serbian and Yugoslav politician and diplomat
- Dan Puric, Romanian actor, theatre director, pantomime artist and political activist
- Dario Purić (born 1986), Bosnian footballer
- Diko Purić (born 1993), Slovenian volleyball player
- Nermin Purić, Bosnia and Herzegovina politician
- Vedran Purić, Croatian footballer and manager

== See also ==
- Purick
- Purich
