= Emerging market =

Country's economy that was traditionally small, but is currently expanding rapidly

An emerging market (EM, also an emerging country or an emerging economy) is a market that has some characteristics of a developed market, but does not fully meet its standards. This includes markets that may become developed markets in the future or were in the past. The term "frontier market" is used for developing countries with smaller, riskier, or more illiquid capital markets than "emerging".

As of 2025, the economies of China and India are considered the largest emerging markets. The ten largest emerging economies by nominal GDP are 4 of the 9 BRICS countries (Brazil, Russia, India, and China) along with Mexico, South Korea, Indonesia, Turkey, Saudi Arabia, and Poland. The inclusion of South Korea, Poland, and sometimes Taiwan are debatable, given they are no longer considered emerging markets by the IMF and World Bank (for Korea and Taiwan). If we exclude South Korea, Poland and/or Taiwan, this list of top ten emerging markets would include Argentina and Thailand.

Emerging market economies' share of global PPP-adjusted GDP has risen from 27 percent in 1960 to around 53 percent by 2013. When countries "graduate" from their emerging status, they are referred to as emerged markets, emerged economies or emerged countries, where countries have developed from emerging economy status, but have yet to reach the technological and economic development of developed countries. According to a 2008 article in The Economist, many people find the term "emerging markets" outdated, but no alternate term has gained wide use. Emerging market hedge fund capital reached a record new level in the first quarter of 2011 of $121 billion.

== Terminology ==
In the 1970s, "less developed countries" (LDCs) was the common term for markets that were less "developed" (by objective or subjective measures) than the developed countries such as the United States, Japan, and those in Western Europe. These markets were supposed to provide greater potential for profit but also more risk from various factors like patent infringement. This term was replaced by emerging market. The term is misleading in that there is no guarantee that a country will move from "less developed" to "more developed"; although that is the general trend in the world, countries can also move from "more developed" to "less developed".

Originally coined in 1981 by then World Bank economist Antoine Van Agtmael, the term is sometimes loosely used as a replacement for emerging economies, but really signifies a business phenomenon that is not fully described or constrained by such; these countries are considered to be in a transitional phase between developing and developed status. Examples of emerging markets include many countries in Africa, most countries in Eastern Europe, some countries of Latin America, some countries in the Middle East, Russia and some countries in Southeast Asia. Emphasizing the fluid nature of the category, political scientist Ian Bremmer defines an emerging market as "a country where politics matters at least as much as economics to the markets".

The research on emerging markets is diffused within management literature. While researchers such as George Haley, Vladimir Kvint, Hernando de Soto, Usha Haley, and several professors from Harvard Business School and Yale School of Management have described activity in countries such as India and China, how a market emerges is now well understood and can easily be modeled.

In 2009, Kvint published this definition: "an emerging market country is a society transitioning from a dictatorship to a free-market-oriented-economy, with increasing economic freedom, gradual integration with the Global Marketplace and with other members of the GEM (Global Emerging Market), an expanding middle class, improving standards of living, social stability and tolerance, as well as an increase in cooperation with multilateral institutions" In 2008 Emerging Economy Report, the Center for Knowledge Societies defines emerging economies as those "regions of the world that are experiencing rapid informationalization under conditions of limited or partial industrialisation". It appears that emerging markets lie at the intersection of non-traditional user behavior, the rise of new user groups and community adoption of products and services, and innovations in product technologies and platforms.

More critical scholars have also studied key emerging markets like Mexico and Turkey. Thomas Marois (2012, 2) argues that financial imperatives have become much more significant and has developed the idea of 'emerging finance capitalism' – an era wherein the collective interests of financial capital principally shape the logical options and choices of government and state elites over and above those of labor and popular classes.

Julien Vercueil recently proposed an pragmatic definition of the "emerging economies", as distinguished from "emerging markets" coined by an approach heavily influenced by financial criteria. According to his definition, an emerging economy displays the following characteristics:

1. Intermediate income: its PPP per capita income is comprised between 10% and 75% of the average EU per capita income.
2. Catching-up growth: during at least the last decade, it has experienced a brisk economic growth that has narrowed the income gap with advanced economies.
3. Institutional transformations and economic opening: during the same period, it has undertaken profound institutional transformations which contributed to integrate it more deeply into the world economy. Hence, emerging economies appears to be a by-product of the current globalization.

At the beginning of the 2010s, more than 50 countries, representing 60% of the world's population and 45% of its GDP, matched these criteria. Among them, the BRICs.

Newly industrialized countries as of 2013. This is an intermediate category between fully developed and developing.

The term "rapidly developing economies" is being used to denote emerging markets such as The United Arab Emirates, Chile and Malaysia that are undergoing rapid growth.

In recent years, new terms have emerged to describe the largest developing countries such as BRIC (Brazil, Russia, India, and China), along with BRICET (BRIC + Eastern Europe and Turkey), BRICS (BRIC + South Africa), BRICM (BRIC + Mexico), MINT (a term coined by Jim O'Neill to describe Mexico, Indonesia, Nigeria and Turkey), Next Eleven (Bangladesh, Egypt, Indonesia, Iran, Mexico, Nigeria, Pakistan, the Philippines, South Korea, Turkey, and Vietnam) and CIVETS (Colombia, Indonesia, Vietnam, Egypt, Turkey and South Africa). These countries do not share any common agenda, but some experts believe that they are enjoying an increasing role in the world economy and on political platforms.

Lists of emerging (or developed) markets vary; guides may be found in such investment information sources as EMIS (a Euromoney Institutional Investor Company), The Economist, or market index makers (such as MSCI).

In an Opalesque.TV video, hedge fund manager Jonathan Binder discusses the current and future relevance of the term "emerging markets" in the financial world. Binder says that in the future investors will not necessarily think of the traditional classifications of "G10" (or G7) versus "emerging markets". Instead, people should look at the world as countries that are fiscally responsible and countries that are not. Whether that country is in Europe or in South America should make no difference, making the traditional "blocs" of categorization irrelevant. Guégan et al. (2014) also discuss the relevance of the terminology "emerging country" comparing the credit worthiness of so-called emerging countries to so-called developed countries. According to their analysis, depending on the criteria used, the term may not always be appropriate.

The 10 Big Emerging Markets (BEM) economies are (alphabetically ordered): Argentina, Brazil, China, India, Indonesia, Mexico, Poland, South Africa, South Korea and Turkey. Egypt, Iran, Nigeria, Pakistan, Russia, Saudi Arabia, Taiwan, and Thailand are other major emerging markets. Analysis of the top ten wealthiest nations in 2025 indicates that several of these major emerging economies, particularly in the Middle East, continue to lead in terms of GDP per capita.

Newly industrialized countries are emerging markets whose economies have not yet reached developed status but have, in a macroeconomic sense, outpaced their developing counterparts.

Investing in emerging markets dates back to at least the mid-1800s, with the establishment of Foreign and Colonial Investment Trust which still trades on the London Stock Exchange under the symbol FCIT as of 2014. While European stocks dominated the globe when measured by market capitalization and the British Empire was the leading international superpower, FCIT invested heavily in North and South America which then largely qualified as emerging markets. English economist John Maynard Keynes also was a pioneer of emerging markets investing from the 1930s, while John Templeton in the 1950s and '60s was one of the earliest American investors to devote significant attention to emerging market stocks. Individual investors today can invest in emerging markets by buying into emerging markets or global funds. If they want to pick single stocks or make their own bets they can do it either through ADRs (American depositor Receipts – stocks of foreign companies that trade on US stock exchanges) or through exchange traded funds (exchange traded funds or ETFs hold basket of stocks). The exchange traded funds can be focused on a particular country (e.g., China, India) or region (e.g., Asia-Pacific, Latin America).

== Emerged market ==
Also referred to as "emerged economy" or "emerged country".

Emerging markets share the economic characteristics such as low income, high growth economies that use market liberalization as their main means of growth. Of course, emerging economies can develop out of such emerging status, entering the post-emerging stage. When emerging markets are promoted from their economic status, they are referred to as emerged markets. Countries like Israel, Poland, South Korea, Taiwan, the Czech Republic, and city-states such as Singapore have transitioned from emerging to "emerged". These emerged markets tend to be characterized by higher incomes and relatively stable political schemes, compared to those categorized as emerging markets.

== Commonly listed countries ==
Various sources list countries as "emerging economies" as indicated by the table below.

A few countries appear in every list (BRICS, Mexico, Turkey, South Africa). Indonesia and Turkey are categorized with Mexico and Nigeria as part of the MINT economies. While there are no commonly agreed upon parameters on which the countries can be classified as "Emerging Economies", several firms have developed detailed methodologies to identify the top performing emerging economies every year. While often treated as one group, emerging market economies are diverse in their factor endowments as well as real, financial, and external linkages. Beyond their levels of financial integration and overall economic development, the size of each market also matters because smaller (but otherwise just as developed) markets may be considered less favorable investment targets.

Emerging markets by each group of analysts
Country	IMF	BRICS	Next Eleven	FTSE	MSCI	S&P	JPM EM bond index	Dow Jones	Russell	Columbia University EMGP	Cornell University EMI E20+1 (2023)
Argentina	✓						✓			✓	✓
Bangladesh	✓		✓				✓				✓
Brazil	✓	✓		✓	✓	✓	✓	✓	✓	✓	✓
Bulgaria	✓										
Chile	✓			✓	✓	✓	✓	✓	✓	✓	✓
China	✓	✓		✓	✓	✓	✓	✓	✓	✓	✓
Colombia	✓			✓	✓	✓	✓	✓	✓	✓	✓
Czech Republic				✓	✓	✓	✓	✓	✓		
Egypt		✓	✓	✓	✓	✓	✓	✓		✓	✓
Greece					✓						
Hungary	✓			✓	✓	✓	✓	✓	✓	✓	
Iceland						✓		✓			
India	✓	✓		✓	✓	✓	✓	✓	✓	✓	✓
Indonesia	✓	✓	✓	✓	✓	✓	✓	✓	✓		✓
Iran		✓	✓								✓
Israel							✓			✓	
South Korea			✓		✓					✓	
Kuwait				✓	✓	✓					
Malaysia	✓			✓	✓	✓	✓	✓	✓		✓
Mauritius										✓	
Mexico	✓		✓	✓	✓	✓	✓	✓	✓	✓	✓
Morocco	✓			✓		✓	✓	✓	✓	✓	
Nigeria			✓				✓				✓
Oman							✓				
Pakistan	✓		✓	✓		✓	✓				✓
Peru	✓			✓	✓	✓	✓	✓	✓		
Philippines	✓		✓	✓	✓	✓	✓	✓	✓		✓
Poland	✓				✓	✓	✓	✓		✓	
Qatar				✓	✓	✓	✓	✓			
Romania	✓			✓			✓				✓
Russia	✓	✓		✓		✓	✓	✓	✓	✓	✓
Saudi Arabia				✓	✓						
South Africa	✓	✓		✓	✓	✓	✓	✓	✓	✓	✓
Taiwan				✓	✓	✓	✓	✓	✓	✓	
Thailand	✓			✓	✓	✓	✓	✓	✓	✓	✓
Turkey	✓		✓	✓	✓	✓	✓	✓	✓	✓	✓
Ukraine	✓						✓				
United Arab Emirates				✓	✓	✓	✓	✓	✓	✓	
Venezuela	✓						✓				
Vietnam			✓	✓							✓

== BBVA Research ==
In November 2010, BBVA Research introduced a new economic concept, to identify key (i.e. large and fast growing) emerging markets. This classification divided economies into two groups based on the overall size of each market and its absolute (not per capita) growth potential.

As of 2014, the groupings were as follows:

EAGLEs (emerging and growth-leading economies): Expected Incremental GDP in the next 10 years to be larger than the average of the G7 economies, excluding the US.

- Brazil
- China
- South Korea
- India
- Indonesia
- Mexico
- Russia
- Turkey

NEST: Expected Incremental GDP in the next decade to be lower than the average of the G6 economies (G7 excluding the US) but higher than Italy's.

- Argentina
- Bangladesh
- Chile
- Colombia
- Egypt
- Iran
- Iraq
- Kazakhstan
- Malaysia
- Nigeria
- Pakistan
- Peru
- Philippines
- Poland
- Qatar
- Saudi Arabia
- South Africa
- Thailand
- Vietnam

Other emerging markets

- Bahrain
- Bulgaria
- Hungary
- Jordan
- Kuwait
- Latvia
- Lithuania
- Mauritius
- Morocco
- Oman
- Romania
- Sri Lanka
- Sudan
- Tunisia
- United Arab Emirates
- Ukraine
- Venezuela

== Emerging Market Bond Index Global ==
The Emerging Market Bond Index Global (EMBI Global) by J.P. Morgan was the first comprehensive EM sovereign index in the market, after the EMBI+. It provides full coverage of the EM asset class with representative countries, investable instruments (sovereign and quasi-sovereign), and transparent rules. The EMBI Global includes only USD-denominated emerging markets sovereign bonds and uses a traditional, market capitalization weighted method for country allocation. As of March end 2016, the EMBI Global's market capitalization was $692.3bn.

For country inclusion, a country's GNI per capita must be below the Index Income Ceiling (IIC) for three consecutive years to be eligible for inclusion to the EMBI Global. J.P. Morgan defines the Index Income Ceiling (IIC) as the GNI per capita level that is adjusted every year by the growth rate of the World GNI per capita, Atlas method (current US$), provided by the World Bank annually. An existing country may be considered for removal from the index if its GNI per capita is above the Index Income Ceiling (IIC) for three consecutive years as well as the country's long term foreign currency sovereign credit rating (the available ratings from all three agencies: S&P, Moody's & Fitch) is A-/A3/A- (inclusive) or above for three consecutive years.

J.P. Morgan has introduced what is called an "Index Income Ceiling" (IIC), defined as the income level that is adjusted every year by the growth rate of the World GNI per capita, provided by the World Bank as "GNI per capita, Atlas method (current US$) annually". Once a country has GNI per capita below or above the IIC level for three consecutive years, the country eligibility will be determined.

- J.P. Morgan has established the base IIC level in 1987 to match the World Bank High Income threshold at US$6,000 GNI per capita.
- Every year, growth in the World GNI per capita figure is applied to the IIC, establishing a new IIC that is dynamic over time.
- This approach ensures that J.P. Morgan's cutoff for index removal is adjusted by the World income growth rate, and not by the inflation rate of a smaller sample of Developed economies.
- This metric essentially incorporates real global growth, global inflation, and currency exchange rate (current USD-denominated) changes.
- Essentially, the introduction of the IIC establishes a higher, more appropriate threshold for country eligibility in the EMBI Global/Diversified.

== Emerging Markets Index ==
The Emerging Markets Index by MasterCard is a list of the top 65 cities in emerging markets. The following countries had cities featured on the list:

Continent	Region	Country
Asia	East Asia	China
Asia	East Asia	South Korea
Asia	East Asia	Taiwan
Asia	South Asia	India
Asia	South Asia	Pakistan
Asia	South East Asia	Indonesia
Asia	South East Asia	Malaysia
Asia	South East Asia	Philippines
Asia	South East Asia	Thailand
Asia	Middle East	Kuwait
Asia	Middle East	Qatar
Asia	Middle East	Saudi Arabia
Asia	Middle East	United Arab Emirates
Americas		Mexico
Americas		Brazil
Americas		Chile
Americas		Colombia
Americas		Peru
Africa		Egypt
Africa		South Africa
Europe		Czech Republic
Europe		Hungary
Europe		Poland
Europe		Russia
Europe		Turkey

== Emerging Market Multinationals Report ==
Launched in 2016 by Lourdes Casanova, Anne Miroux, at Emerging Markets Institute, at the Samuel Curtis Johnson Graduate School of Management, Cornell University, the Emerging Market Multinationals Report analyzes the economic performance of the emerging economies and emerging market multinationals (EMNCs), exploring among others the foreign investment, revenues, valuation and other business data of these firms with the help of the EMI research team. The second part of the report includes chapters by EmNet at the OECD Development Centre, International Finance Corporation at the World Bank Group, the business school at the University of the Andes (Colombia), and other universities of the Emerging Multinationals Research Network and beyond.

The report launched the emerging economies "E20+1" grouping, that includes the top 20 emerging economies plus China. These economies are selected based on nominal gross domestic product (GDP) per capita, share in global trade and poverty levels.

In the 2020 report, EMI published the different milestones of the E20 countries. In 2021, launched the EMI Ranking of the 500 largest companies by revenue (EMNC 500R), the 500 largest by market capitalization (500MC), and the 200 best ESG performer companies (200ESG). In 2022, the report released D-ESG ranking of the E20+1. The D-ESG ranking assesses countries based on their economic growth (D) and ESG performances.

== Global Growth Generators ==
"Global Growth Generators", or 3G (countries), is an alternative classification determined by Citigroup analysts as being countries with the most promising growth prospects for 2010–2050. These consist of Indonesia, Egypt, seven other emerging countries, and two countries not previously listed before, specifically Iraq and Mongolia. There has been disagreement about the reclassification of these countries, among others, for the purpose of acronym creation as was seen with the BRICS.

== Estimating Demand in Emerging Markets ==
Estimating the demand for products or services in emerging markets and developing economies can be complex and challenging for managers. These countries have unique commercial environments and may be limited in terms of reliable data, market research firms, and trained interviewers. Consumers in some of these countries may consider surveys an invasion of privacy. Survey respondents may try to please researchers by telling them what they want to hear rather than providing honest answers to their questions. However some companies have dedicated their entire business units for understanding the dynamics of emerging markets owing to their peculiarity.

== Economy ==
The following table lists the GDP (PPP) projections of the 30 largest emerging economies for the year of 2026 (unless otherwise stated). Members of the BRICS, the BRICS Partners and/or the New Development Bank are in bold.

Rank	Country	Continent	GDP (PPP) (millions of USD)
1	**China**	Asia	44,554,951
2	**India**	Asia	19,192,617
—	African Union	Africa and Asia	12,663,816
3	**Russia**	Europe and Asia	7,542,897
4	**Indonesia**	Asia and Oceania	5,483,042
5	**Brazil**	South America	5,266,506
6	Turkey	Asia and Europe	4,025,804
7	South Korea	Asia	3,625,973
8	Mexico	North America	3,594,397
9	**Saudi Arabia** (2025)	Asia	2,730,087
10	**Egypt**	Africa and Asia	2,600,028
11	**Nigeria**	Africa	2,438,180
12	Taiwan	Asia	2,406,687
13	Poland	Europe	2,181,830
14	**Vietnam**	Asia	2,058,905
15	**Thailand**	Asia	1,983,943
16	**Bangladesh**	Asia	1,909,362
17	**Iran** (2025)	Asia	1,856,013
18	Pakistan	Asia	1,806,861
19	**Malaysia**	Asia	1,624,495
20	Argentina	South America	1,577,460
21	Philippines	Asia	1,569,841
22	**Colombia**	South America	1,262,046
23	Singapore	Asia	1,082,946
24	**South Africa**	Africa	1,075,434
25	**Kazakhstan**	Asia and Europe	996,311
26	**United Arab Emirates** (2025)	Asia	975,380
27	Romania (2025)	Europe	968,038
28	**Algeria**	Africa	947,065
29	Chile (2025)	South America	750,190
30	Ukraine (2021)	Europe	746,471

== See also ==
- Developed market
- Frontier market
- Global North and Global South
- Tehran Stock Exchange
- Free trade area
