= 2010 Canton 10 parliamentary election =

Cantonal election in Bosnia and Herzegovina

- 3 October 2010
- All 25 seats in the Assembly of Canton 10; 13 seats needed for a majority
- Turnout: 52.61% (▲3.17 pp) (Note: The turnout change is the difference between the published percentages, rounded to two decimal places: 52.61% in 2010 and 49.44% in 2006.)
Party	Leader	Vote %	Seats	+/–
HDZ BiH	Stipo Pelivan	26.15	7	+2
HDZ 1990	Nediljko Rimac	13.15	4	−2
SNSD	Drago Puzigaća	11.99	3	−2
NSRzB	Ivica Matković	10.17	3	+2
HSP BiH	Josip Perić	9.59	3	−1
SDA	Jasenko Tufekčić	5.58	2	0
HSS–NHI	Ivan Milić	4.83	1	New
SDP BiH	Krunoslav Vrdoljak	4.52	1	0
DNS	Vlatko Zrilić	4.41	1	+1
This lists parties that won seats. See the complete results below.
Prime Minister before	Prime Minister after
Nediljko Rimac; HDZ 1990	Nediljko Rimac; HDZ 1990

The 2010 Canton 10 parliamentary election was held on 3 October 2010 to elect all 25 members of the Assembly of Canton 10 in Canton 10, one of the ten cantons of the Federation of Bosnia and Herzegovina. It was part of the 2010 Bosnian general election.

The Croatian Democratic Union of Bosnia and Herzegovina (HDZ BiH) was the largest party, winning seven of the 25 seats, two more than in 2006. HDZ 1990 won four seats; SNSD, NSRzB and HSP BiH won three each; SDA won two; and HSS–NHI, SDP BiH and DNS won one each.

== Results ==
20 lists contested the election. There were 30,488 valid votes and 1,632 invalid ballots. The results were certified on 2 November 2010.

Final results
Party or alliance	Votes	%	Seats	Change from 2006 (Note: HDZ 1990 is compared with the 2006 Hrvatsko zajedništvo coalition (HDZ 1990–HZ–HSS–HKDU–HDU–Demokršćani), and HSP BiH with the 2006 HSP Đapić–Jurišić–NHI coalition. HSS–NHI is treated as a separate 2010 list and compared with zero seats; the former coalitions' seats are counted only once.)
HDZ BiH	7,973	26.15	7	+2
HDZ 1990	4,008	13.15	4	−2
SNSD	3,654	11.99	3	−2
NSRzB	3,101	10.17	3	+2
HSP BiH	2,924	9.59	3	−1
SDA	1,702	5.58	2	0
HSS SR–NHI	1,472	4.83	1	+1
SDP BiH	1,377	4.52	1	0
DNS	1,346	4.41	1	+1
PDP	718	2.36	0	0
Stipo-Rade Ćurković (independent)	668	2.19	0	0
SBB BiH	484	1.59	0	0
HSP Dr. AS	344	1.13	0	0
SBiH	323	1.06	0	−1
NS–NSP	98	0.32	0	0
SDU BiH	92	0.30	0	0
ZSD	81	0.27	0	0
SDS	70	0.23	0	0
DNZ BiH	37	0.12	0	0
DS	16	0.05	0	0
Total	30,488	100.00	25	
Source: Central Election Commission of Bosnia and Herzegovina (2010 results and comparison with 2006).

Ballot totals and turnout
Ballot category	Number	% of ballots cast
Valid votes	30,488	94.92
Invalid votes, excluding blank ballots	771	2.40
Blank ballots	861	2.68
Total ballots cast	32,120	100.00
Registered voters	61,058	—
Turnout	52.61% (▲3.17 pp)	
Source: Central Election Commission of Bosnia and Herzegovina.

Valid votes by voting method
Voting method	Valid votes	% of valid votes
Regular	29,483	96.70
Postal	587	1.93
Absentee, mobile team and diplomatic/consular	395	1.30
Tendered	23	0.08
Total	30,488	100.00
Source: Central Election Commission of Bosnia and Herzegovina.

== Government formation ==
Nediljko Rimac (HDZ 1990) was prime minister before the election. On 31 July 2012, the Assembly confirmed a new government headed by Rimac.
