= Abdić (surname) =

Abdić is a surname. Notable people with the surname include:

- Fikret Abdić (born 1939), Bosnian politician, businessman and president of the Autonomous Province of Western Bosnia
- Elvira Abdić-Jelenović (born 1972), Bosnian politician
