= Economic Bloc =

Political alliance in Bosnia and Herzegovina

The Economic Bloc "Croat Democratic Union for Prosperity" (Croatian: Ekonomski Blok HDU – Za Boljitak) was a political alliance in Bosnia and Herzegovina.

== History ==
The alliance was formed for the 2002 general elections by the People's Party for Work and Betterment and the Croatian Democratic Union of Bosnia and Herzegovina. It received 1.3% of the vote in the national parliamentary elections, winning a single seat in the national House of Representatives, taken by Mladen Potočnik. Its candidate for the Croat member of the Presidency, Mladen Ivanković-Lijanović, finished second with 17% of the Croat vote. The alliance also won two seats in the House of Representatives of the Federation of Bosnia and Herzegovina.
