= Croats Together =

Croats Together (Croatian: Hrvatsko zajedništvo) was an electoral alliance in Bosnia and Herzegovina consisting of the Croatian Democratic Union 1990, the Croatian Peasant Party, the Croatian Christian Democratic Union, the Croatian Democratic Union and the Croatian Christian Democrats. In the 2006 general elections it won two seats in the national House of Representatives and seven seats in the House of Representatives of the Federation of Bosnia and Herzegovina.
