= Purich =

Purić is a Slavic surname. Notable people with the surname include:

- Natasha Purich, Canadian pair skater
- Noel Padgham-Purich, Australian politician

== See also ==
- Purick
- Purić
