= Croatian Right Bloc =

The Croatian Right Bloc (Croatian: Hrvatski pravaški blok) was a Croatian political party in Bosnia and Herzegovina. On 8 August 2016, the party joined into the HSP BiH.
