= Usha Haley =

American author and academic

Usha C. V. Haley is an American author and academic. She serves as the director of the university’s Center for International Business Advancement and as the chair of the independent World Trade Council of Wichita.

Haley previously worked at West Virginia University, Massey University in New Zealand, University of New Haven, University of Tennessee-Knoxville, New Jersey Institute of Technology/Rutgers, Australian National University (Australia), National University of Singapore (Singapore), and ITESM-Monterrey (Mexico); and taught graduate students at Harvard University, Purdue University, and in development programs

== Early life and education ==
Born in Mumbai, India, Haley earned a bachelor’s degree in politics from Elphinstone College (University of Mumbai). She received a master’s degree in political science from the University of Illinois Urbana–Champaign and PhD in International Business and Strategy from New York University’s Stern School of Business.

== Research ==
Haley's research focuses on companies and business environments in India, China, Southeast Asia, and Mexico, as well as the societal impacts of business schools and their research. She has also studied the effects of sanctions and trade barriers, such as subsidies, on the behavior of companies and nations. Her research on boycotts, divestitures, and regulations, published in Multinational Corporations in Political Environments, concluded that most sanctions had no effect on US corporate behavior in South Africa. She also published The Chinese Tao of Business and New Asian Emperors.

Her research appeared in the Wall Street Journal, ("U.S. Researcher Usha C.V. Haley's Study on Chinese Subsidies to its Glass Industry", Aug 30, 2010) The Economist ("Survey of Asian Business", April 7–13, 2001), CNN ("Special Report: Eye on China," May 18–19, 2005), Bloomberg News ("China Steel Makers get $27 Billion Subsidy," January 8, 2008), Barron's Magazine ("Foreign Carmakers keep up the Pressure on Detroit," October 22, 2001), USA Today ("Tech Start-Ups Don't Grow on Trees Outside USA", June 28, 2006) the Wall Street Journal ("Could the Asian Crises Repeat?", July 3, 2007), The New York Times, ("With New Urgency US and South Korea Seek Free Trade Deal", January 16, 2007) and BusinessWeek ("The Art of Chinese Relationships", January 6, 2006).

== Research impact ==
In October 2009, Haley's research on subsidies to China's industry was used by the US government to question Chinese trade and production practices in the US-China Joint Commission on Commerce and Trade (JCCT), the major venue for business and trade negotiations between the two countries.

In July 2010, drawing on her research on China's paper industry, 104 U.S. senators and Representatives wrote a "bi-partisan letter to President Obama" recommending action on China trade.

In September 2011, Haley delivered a Thought Leader presentation on business and government relations in China at the Economist's flagship High Growth Market Summit in London.

In January 2012, her research on subsidies to Chinese auto parts became part of a congressional effort to demand an inquiry into Chinese auto-parts production and effects on US jobs. The bi-partisan effort is led by Senator Sherrod Brown (Ohio), Senator Debbie Stabenow (Michigan), industry groups and think tanks.

In 2012, her research on the evolution of the global energy industry supported the Obama administration's and industry groups' successful levying of tariffs on Chinese solar panel imports into the USA.

In July 2013, Haley served as a witness in the United States Senate hearing on Smithfield and beyond: Examining foreign purchases of American food companies. Citing food-safety violations, senior managers' connections to the Chinese Communist Party, Chinese government competitive stances, Chinese subsidies and research on Chinese strategy, Haley advocated against the takeover of Virginia-based Smithfield Foods by Chinese company Shuanghui on national-security grounds.

In April 2006, she testified before the US-China Economic and Security Review Commission on the effects of Chinese government subsidies on US business operations in China.

In March 2007, she testified before the United States House Committee on Ways and Means in support of the US federal trade legislation, The Nonmarket Economy Trade Remedy Act of 2007. She has also presented her research on China before the U.S. International Trade Commission, the United States Trade Representative and the United States Department of Commerce.

== Awards and honors ==
In August 2012, Haley received the Academy of Management's Practice Impact Award for her research on strategic trade issues, particularly between the USA and China, which has impacted federal policy.

== Books ==
- New Asian Emperors: The Overseas Chinese, their Strategies and Competitive Advantages (Butterworth-Heineman, 1998)
- Strategic Management in the Asia Pacific: Harnessing Regional and Organizational Change for Competitive Advantage (Butterworth-Heinemann, 2000)
- Multinational Corporations in Political Environments: Ethics, Values and Strategies (World Scientific, 2001, 2004)
- Asian Post-crisis Management: Corporate and Governmental Strategies for Sustainable Competitive Advantage (Palgrave, 2002)
- The Chinese Tao of Business: The Logic of Successful Business Strategy (John Wiley & Sons, 2004, 2006)
- New Asian Emperors: The Business Strategies of the Overseas Chinese (John Wiley & Sons, 2009)
- Subsidies to Chinese Industry: State Capitalism, Business Strategy and Trade Policy (Oxford University Press, 2012)
- Impact and the Management Researcher (Routledge, 2021)

== Articles ==
- Subsidies and the China Price, Harvard Business Review, June 2008
- Government Strategy and Firm Policy in the Solar Photovoltaic Industry, California Management Review, November 2011
- Storytelling the Internationalization of the Multinational Enterprise, Journal of International Business Studies, December 2014
