= Labour Party of Bosnia and Herzegovina =

Labour Party of Bosnia and Herzegovina Laburistička stranka Bosne i Hercegovine
- Abbreviation: LS BiH
- President: Elvira Abdić-Jelenović
- General Secretary: Amir Đogić
- Founder: Elvira Abdić-Jelenović
- Founded: 28 December 2013
- Split from: Democratic People's Union
- Headquarters: Velika Kladuša
- Ideology: Labourism; Regionalism
- Political position: Center-left
- Colors: Orange
- Slogan: Korak ispred drugih! (Step ahead of others!)
- HoR BiH: 0 / 42
- HoP BiH: 0 / 15
- HoR FBiH: 0 / 98
- HoP FBiH: 0 / 80
- NA RS: 0 / 83

Website
- laburistibih.ba

Labour Party of Bosnia and Herzegovina (Serbo-Croatian: Laburistička stranka Bosne i Hercegovine) is a political party in Bosnia and Herzegovina based in Velika Kladuša, Una-Sana Canton in the Federation of Bosnia and Herzegovina, which serves as its main base. The party was founded in 2013 by Elvira Abdić-Jelenović, a daughter of Fikret Abdić, an influential politician and businessman from the region.

== History ==
After Elvira Abdić-Jelenović was banned from her previous party founded by her father Fikret Abdić, the Democratic People's Union in 2013, she founded a new party with group of supporters. The Labour party of Bosnia and Herzegovina was founded on 28 December 2013 in Velika Kladuša. Abdić-Jelenović was elected the first president of the party.

== Electoral history ==
=== Parliamentary elections ===
Assembly of the Una-Sana Canton
Year	#	Popular vote	%	Seats	Seat change	Government
2014	6th	5,290	5.58	2 / 30	New	Opposition
2018	4th	7,357	7.97	3 / 30	▲1	Opposition
2022	7th	3,888	4.30	1 / 30	▼2	Opposition

Parliamentary Assembly of Bosnia and Herzegovina
Year	Leader	#	Popular vote	%	HoR	Seat change	HoP	Seat change	Government
2014	Elvira Abdić-Jelenović	22nd	5,731	0.35	0 / 42	New	0 / 15	New	Extra-parliamentary
2018	Elvira Abdić-Jelenović	21st	7,734	0.47	0 / 42	0	0 / 15	0	Extra-parliamentary
2022	Elvira Abdić-Jelenović	25th	3,727	0.23	0 / 42	0	0 / 15	0	Extra-parliamentary
2026	Elvira Abdić-Jelenović	23th	3,594	0.27	0 / 42	0	0 / 15	0	Extra-parliamentary
