= Diko Purić =

Slovenian volleyball player (born 1993)

Personal information
- Nationality: Slovenian
- Born: 2 October 1993 (age 33)
- Height: 2.02 m (6 ft 8 in)
- Weight: 84 kg (185 lb)
- Spike: 336 cm (132 in)
- Block: 317 cm (125 in)

Volleyball information
- Position: Middle Blocker
- Current club: Calcit Volley
- Number: 4

Career
- Years: Team
- 2015–2020 2020–: ACH Volley; Calcit Volley

National team
- Years: Team
- –: Slovenia

Diko Purić (born 2 October 1993) is a Slovenian male volleyball player who plays for Calcit Volley. With the Slovenian national team, he competed in the 2016 FIVB Volleyball World League.
