= Elvira Abdić-Jelenović =

Bosnian politician

Member of the Municipal Council of Velika Kladuša
- Incumbent
- Assumed office 1 December 2016

Member of the Assembly of the Una-Sana Canton
- Incumbent
- Assumed office 14 November 2022

President of the Labour Party of Bosnia and Herzegovina
- Incumbent
- Assumed office 28 December 2013
- Preceded by: Office established

Croat delegate in the Federal House of Peoples
- In office 25 January 2007 – 15 January 2015

Personal details
- Born: 7 September 1967 (age 58) Karlovac, SR Croatia, SFR Yugoslavia
- Party: Labour Party of Bosnia and Herzegovina (since 2013) Democratic People's Union (1993–2013)
- Spouse: Robert Jelenović
- Relations: Fikret Abdić (father)
- Education: University of Rijeka
- Occupation: Politician
- Profession: Engineer
- Website: Official website

Elvira Abdić-Jelenović (born 7 September 1967) is a Bosnian politician. She is the president of the Labour Party of Bosnia and Herzegovina, founded in 2013. Prior to that, she was a long-year member of the Democratic People's Union, a party founded by her father Fikret Abdić, from which she and her father were banned after internal changes within the party.

== Biography ==
Abdić-Jelenović was born in Karlovac. Her father is the Bosnian politician and businessman Fikret Abdić.

Abdić Jelenović studied at the Faculty of Civil Engineering at the University of Rijeka. In 2006 she was elected to the Federal Parliament as a Croat representative in the House of Peoples.
