= Pensioners' Party of the Republika Srpska =

Serb political party in Bosnia and Herzegovina

The Pensioners' Party of the Republika Srpska (Serbian: Пензионерска Странка Републике Српске, romanized: Penzionerska Stranka Republike Srpske) is a Serb political party in Bosnia and Herzegovina. In the 2002 general election the party secured a seat in the National Assembly.
