= Mladen Ivanković-Lijanović =

Mladen Ivanković-Lijanović (born 22 August 1960 in Duvno (now Tomislavgrad), Bosnia and Herzegovina, then Yugoslavia) is a Bosnian politician and businessman. He is the founder and leader of the People's Party Work for Betterment.

== Biography ==
Lijanović was born in the rural part of the Tomislavgrad municipality into a family which included three brothers and a sister. The family wealth was made in the meat processing industry prior to the beginning of the Bosnian War.

Lijanović twice ran unsuccessfully for the Bosnian Croat seat in the Presidency of Bosnia and Herzegovina. In 2006, his brother, Jerko, was elected to the Bosnian parliament. In 2010, his political party gained many Bosnian Croat votes that had previously often gone to the parties of HDZBiH and HDZ1990.
