= Croatian Peasant Party of Stjepan Radić =

Croatian Peasant Party of Stjepan Radić Hrvatska seljačka stranka Stjepana Radića
- President: Anto Lozančić
- Founded: 4 April 2012
- Split from: Croatian Peasant Party of Bosnia and Herzegovina
- Headquarters: Stjepana Radića bb Novi Travnik, Bosnia and Herzegovina
- Ideology: Christian democracy Agrarianism
- Political position: Centre-right
- National affiliation: Croatian National Assembly
- International affiliation: Centrist Democrat International
- Colours: Green; Red, White, Blue
- HoR BiH: 0 / 42
- HoP BiH: 0 / 15
- HoR FBiH: 0 / 98
- HoP FBiH: 0 / 80
- Cantonal Premiers: 0 / 10
- Mayors: 1 / 145

The Croatian Peasant Party of Stjepan Radić (Croatian: Hrvatska seljačka stranka Stjepana Radića or HSS SR) is a minor Croatian political party in Bosnia and Herzegovina.

In 2007, Croatian Peasant Party of Bosnia and Herzegovina and the New Croatian Initiative merged. The New Croatian Initiative was formed as a splinter group from the Croatian Democratic Union of Bosnia and Herzegovina by Krešimir Zubak. They were originally named HSS-NHI (CPP-NCI). After HSS-NHI underwent turmoil and internal divisions grew, a division of former HSS members led by Ljiljana Lovrić left the party and reestablished HSS in 2010. Shortly afterwards, another splinter group from HSS-NHI led by Anto Lozančić formed HSS Stjepan Radić. In 2014 general elections, they chose not to stand in the elections. HSS Stjepan Radić is a member party of the Croatian National Assembly.

In the 2020–24 legislative period, HSS SR has the majority in one municipality in the country, Croat-majority Dobretići.
