= Croatian Christian Democrats (Bosnia and Herzegovina) =

The Croatian Christian Democrats (Croatian: Hrvatski demokršćani) was a Christian-democratic political party in Bosnia and Herzegovina. It merged with the Croatian Party of Rights of Bosnia and Herzegovina.
