= Liberal Democratic Party (Bosnia and Herzegovina) =

Liberal Democratic Party of Bosnia and Herzegovina Liberalno demokratska stranka Bosne i Hercegovine
- Leader: Hasib Salkić
- Founded: 1990
- Dissolved: 2022
- Merger of: Liberal Party; Liberal Bosniak Organization
- Merged into: Our Party
- Headquarters: Maršala Tita 9a, 71000 Sarajevo
- Ideology: Liberalism
- Regional affiliation: Liberal South East European Network
- European affiliation: Alliance of Liberals and Democrats for Europe
- International affiliation: Liberal International (Observer)
- Colours: Blue, yellow

Website
- www.lds.ba

The Liberal Democratic Party of Bosnia and Herzegovina (Bosnian: Liberalno demokratska stranka Bosne i Hercegovine) was a liberal party in Bosnia and Herzegovina. On 1 December 2017 the party became an affiliate of the Alliance of Liberals and Democrats for Europe Party.

During the 2018 Federation of Bosnia and Herzegovina general election, the LDS received only 1,833 (0.11%) votes and failed to secure any seats in the House of Representatives. However, the party did win 4 seats in the Assembly of Bosnian-Podrinje Canton Goražde and 6 seats in the Assembly of Canton 10. It was later announced that the LDS would merge with Our Party ahead of the 2022 general election, as part of the pre-election process.

What The Party Stands For:

- For Democracy, Rule of Law, Human Rights, Tolerance, and Solidarity.
- For a Just, Free, and Open Society.
- For a Prosperous Bosnia and Herzegovina within a Prosperous Europe.
- For Stable Development and Peace in the World.

Members of the Presidency of the LDP BiH

- Hasib Salkić – President

== See also ==
- Liberalism
- Contributions to liberal theory
- Liberalism worldwide
- List of liberal parties
- Liberal democracy
