= Democratic People's Union =

Democratic People's Union – B&H Demokratska narodna zajednica – BiH
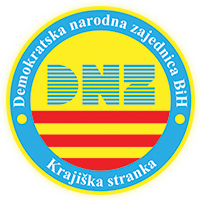
- Leader: Rifat Dolić
- Founder: Fikret Abdić
- Founded: 8–9 October 1993; 32 years ago
- Headquarters: Velika Kladuša
- Ideology: Wartime: Regionalism; Federalism; Separatism; Neo-corporatism; Peacetime: Regionalism; Agrarianism; Anti-corruption
- Political position: Right-wing
- Colours: Blue, Red, Yellow
- HoR BiH: 0 / 42
- HoP BiH: 0 / 15
- HoR FBiH: 0 / 98
- HoP FBiH: 0 / 80
- NA RS: 0 / 83

Party flag

Website
- dnzbih.ba

The Democratic People's Union (Serbo-Croatian: Demokratska narodna zajednica, DNZ) is a political party in Bosnia and Herzegovina. It was founded in 1993 and first led by Fikret Abdić.

In 2014 the Democratic People's Union saw a major split when a large number of its members led by Elvira Abdić-Jelenović (Fikret's daughter) founded a new party, the Labour Party of Bosnia and Herzegovina. Due to this split, the DNZ now has only 2 out of 28 members of the Velika Kladuša Municipality Council, while the new Labour Party gained a large majority.
