= People's Party Work for Prosperity =

People's Party Work for Prosperity Narodna stranka Radom za Boljitak
- Leader: Mladen Ivanković-Lijanović
- Founded: 1 October 2001
- Headquarters: Kranjčevićeva 41, Sarajevo
- Ideology: Social liberalism Secularism
- Political position: Centre to centre-left
- Colours: Blue, green and red
- HoR BiH: 0 / 42
- HoP BiH: 0 / 15
- HoR FBiH: 0 / 98
- HoP FBiH: 0 / 80
- NA RS: 0 / 83

Website
- www.zaboljitak.ba

People's Party Work for Prosperity (Bosnian and Croatian: Narodna stranka Radom za Boljitak; abbr. NSRzB) is a multi-ethnic party in Bosnia and Herzegovina. It was founded and is run by Mladen Ivanković-Lijanović, from Široki Brijeg.
