= Croatian Christian Democratic Union of Bosnia and Herzegovina =

Croatian Christian Democratic Union of Bosnia and Herzegovina Hrvatska kršćanska demokratska unija Bosne i Hercegovine
- Abbreviation: HKDU BiH
- President: Josipa Prskalo
- Founded: 26 September 2009
- Headquarters: Mostar, Bosnia and Herzegovina
- Ideology: Christian democracy National conservatism
- Political position: Centre-right to right-wing
- National affiliation: Croatian National Assembly
- Colours: Dark blue, Red
- HoR BiH: 0 / 42
- HoP BiH: 0 / 15
- HoR FBiH: 0 / 98
- HoP FBiH: 0 / 80

The Croatian Christian Democratic Union of Bosnia and Herzegovina (Croatian: Hrvatska kršćanska demokratska unija Bosne i Hercegovine, HKDU BiH) is a minor Croatian political party in Bosnia and Herzegovina.

== See also ==
- Croatian Christian Democratic Union
