= List of political parties in Bosnia and Herzegovina =

Bosnia and Herzegovina has a multi-party system, with numerous parties in which no one often has a chance of gaining power alone, and parties must work with each other to form coalition governments.

== List ==
=== Represented in the Parliamentary Assembly ===
Party	Abbr.	Leader	Ideology	Representatives	Delegates	Political position	European affiliation
Party of Democratic Action; Stranka demokratske akcije	SDA	Bakir Izetbegović	Bosniak nationalism; Conservatism; Islamism; Pro-Europeanism	9 / 42	2 / 15	Centre-right to right-wing	EPP (observer)
Alliance of Independent Social Democrats; Савез независних социјалдемократа	SNSD; СНСД	Milorad Dodik	Serbian nationalism; Populism; Entity interests; Social democracy	6 / 42	3 / 15	Big tent Centre-left	—N/a
Social Democratic Party; Socijaldemokratska partija Социјалдемократска партија	SDP; СДП	Nermin Nikšić	Social democracy; Pro-Europeanism	5 / 42	0 / 15	Centre-left	PES (associate)
Croatian Democratic Union; Hrvatska demokratska zajednica	HDZ	Dragan Čović	Conservatism; Christian democracy; Croatian nationalism; Pro-Europeanism	4 / 42	3 / 15	Centre-right to right-wing	EPP (observer)
Party for Bosnia and Herzegovina; Stranka za Bosnu i Hercegovinu	SBiH	Semir Efendić	Bosniak nationalism; Political unitarism; Pro-Europeanism	3 / 42	1 / 15	Centre	—N/a
Democratic Front; Demokratska fronta Демократски фронт	DF; ДФ	Željko Komšić	Political unitarism; Civic nationalism; Pro-Europeanism	2 / 42	1 / 15	Centre to centre-left	—N/a
People and Justice; Narod i Pravda	NiP	Elmedin Konaković	Liberal conservatism; Social conservatism; Pro-Europeanism	2 / 42	0 / 15	Centre-right	—N/a
Serb Democratic Party; Српска демократска странка	SDS; СДС	Branko Blanuša	Serbian nationalism; Conservatism; Pro-Europeanism	2 / 42	1 / 15	Centre-right to right-wing	—N/a
Party of Democratic Progress; Партија демократског прогреса	PDP; ПДП	Draško Stanivuković	Serb ethnic interests; Economic liberalism; Pro-Europeanism	2 / 42	1 / 15	Centre to centre-right	EPP (observer)
Our Party; Naša stranka Наша странка	NS; НС	Sabina Ćudić	Social liberalism; Secularism; Anti-nationalism; Pro-Europeanism	1 / 42	0 / 15	Centre to centre-left	ALDE
People's European Union; Narodni evropski savez	NES	Nermin Ogrešević	Bosniak nationalism; Conservatism; Pro-Europeanism	1 / 42	0 / 15	Centre to centre-right	—N/a
Croatian Democratic Union 1990; Hrvatska demokratska zajednica 1990	HDZ 1990	Ilija Cvitanović	Christian democracy; Conservatism; Croatian nationalism; Federalism; Pro-Europeanism	1 / 42	1 / 15	Centre-right	EPP (observer)
For Justice and Order; За правду и ред	ZPR; ЗПР	Nebojša Vukanović	Anti-corruption; Anti-nationalism; Pro-Europeanism	1 / 42	0 / 15	Big tent	—N/a
United Srpska; Уједињена Српска	US; УС	Nenad Stevandić	Serbian nationalism; Ultranationalism; National conservatism	1 / 42	0 / 15	Centre-right to far-right	—N/a
Democratic People's Alliance; Демократски народни савез	DNS; ДNС	Nenad Nešić	Serbian nationalism; Conservatism; National conservatism	1 / 42	0 / 15	Centre-right	—N/a
Democratic Union; Демократски савез	DEMOS; ДЕМОС	Nedeljko Čubrilović	Conservatism	1 / 42	0 / 15	Centre-right	—N/a

=== Represented in Entity Parliaments ===
Name	Abbr.	Leader	Ideology	HoR FBiH	HoP FBiH	NA RS	Political position
Movement of Democratic Action; Pokret demokratske akcije	PDA	Elzina Pirić	Bosniak nationalism; Conservatism; Regionalism	1 / 98	1 / 80	—N/a	Centre-right
Bosnian-Herzegovinian Greens; Bosanskohercegovački Zeleni	BH Zeleni; BHZ	Sevlid Hurtić	Green politics Pro-Europeanism	0 / 98	0 / 80	1 / 83	Centre to centre-left
Croatian National Shift; Hrvatski nacionalni pomak	HNP	Ivan Vukadin	Conservatism; Regionalism	1 / 98	1 / 80	—N/a	Centre-right
Croatian Republican Party; Hrvatska republikanska stranka	HRS	Slaven Raguž	Conservatism; Christian democracy; Pro-Europeanism; Decentralization Federalism	1 / 98	0 / 80	—N/a	Centre-right
Movement for a Modern and Active Krajina; Pokret za Modernu i Aktivnu Krajinu	POMAK	Elvedin Sedić	Regionalism	1 / 98	0 / 80	—N/a	Centre
People's Power; Snaga naroda	SN	Ramo Isak	Populism; Anti-corruption; Pro-Europeanism	1 / 98	0 / 80	—N/a	Centre to centre-right
Croatian Peasant Party; Hrvatska seljačka stranka	HSS	Mario Karamatić	Agrarianism; Croatian nationalism	1 / 98	0 / 80	—N/a	Centre-right
For New Generations; Za Nove Generacije	ZNG	Damir Marjanović	Social liberalism; Green liberalism; Pro-Europeanism; Secularism	0 / 98	1 / 80	—N/a	Centre to centre-left
Socialist Party; Социјалистичка Партија	SP; СП	Petar Đokić	Social democracy; Democratic socialism; Euroscepticism	—N/a	—N/a	5 / 83	Centre-left
People's Party of Srpska; Народна партија Српске	NPS; НПС	Darko Banjac	Serbian nationalism; Conservatism; Christian democracy; Atlanticism; Pro-Europeanism	—N/a	—N/a	3 / 83	Right-wing
Socialist Party of Srpska; Социјалистичка партија Српске	SPS; СПС	Goran Selak	Social democracy	—N/a	—N/a	3 / 83	Centre-left
People's Front; Народни Фронт	NF; НФ	Jelena Trivić	Anti-corruption; Economic liberalism; Pro-Europeanism	—N/a	—N/a	3 / 83	Centre to centre-right

=== Extra-parliamentary parties ===
Name	Abbr.	Leader	Ideology
Bosnian-Herzegovinian Patriotic Party; Bosanskohercegovačka patriotska stranka	BPS	Sefer Halilović	Bosnian nationalism; National conservativism
Bosnian Party; Bosanska stranka	BOSS	Mirnes Ajanović	Left-wing populism
Civic Democratic Party; Građanska demokratska stranka	GDS	Ibrahim Spahić	Social liberalism
Croatian Christian Democratic Union; Hrvatska kršćanska demokratska unija	HKDU	Ivanka Barić	Christian democracy
Croatian Peasant Party of Stjepan Radić; Hrvatska seljačka stranka Stjepana Radića	HSS SR	Anto Lozančić	Christian democracy; Agrarianism
Croatian Party of Rights; Hrvatska stranka prava	HSP	Nikola Raguž	Croatian ultranationalism; National conservatism
Democratic People's Union; Demokratska narodna zajednica	DNZ	Admil Mulalić	Regionalism; Big tent
Democratic Party of Federalists; Demokratska stranka federalista	DSF	Dragan Đokanović	Federalism; Pro-Europeanism
Greens of Bosnia and Herzegovina; Zeleni Bosne i Hercegovine	Zeleni	Hasan Delić	Green politics
Independent Bloc; Bosnian: Nezavisni blok Cyrillic: Независни блок	NB; НБ	Senad Šepić	Civic nationalism Conservatism
Labour Party; Laburistička stranka	LS	Elvira Abdić-Jelenović	Labourism; Regionalism
Party of United Pensioners; Partija ujedinjenih penzionera	PUP	Vinko Pušonja	Centrism; Pensioners' interests
Pensioners' Party; Stranka penzionera-umirovljenika	SPU	Dževad Hodžić	Pensioners' interests
People's Party Work for Prosperity; Narodna stranka Radom za Boljitak	NSRzB	Mladen Ivanković-Lijanović	Social liberalism; Secularism
Pirate Party; Piratska partija	PP	Position vacant	Pirate politics; Liquid democracy
Party of Croatian Right; Stranka hrvatskog prava	SHP	Ante Matić	Croatian nationalism; Conservativism
Bosnia-Herzegovina Party of Rights 1861; Bosanskohercegovačka stranka prava 1861	BSP 1861	Vlado Musa	Croatian nationalism; Conservativism
Platform for Progress; Platforma za progres	PzP	Mirsad Hadžikadić	Centrism; Pro-Europeanism; Atlanticism
Serbian Radical Party "9th January"; Српска радикална странка „9. јануар”	SRS 9J	Dragan Đurđević	Serbian nationalism; Conservatism
Social Democrats; Socijaldemokrate Bosne i Hercegovine	SD	Enver Bijedić	Social democracy; Pro-Europeanism
Union for a Better Future of BiH; Savez za bolju budućnost BiH	SBB	Fahrudin Radončić	Conservatism; Secularism
Workers' Communist Party; Radničko-komunistička partija	RKP	Goran Marković	Communism; Luxemburgism

=== Defunct and historical parties ===
Name	Abbr.	Leader	Ideology
Communist Party; Komunistička partija	KP	Muhamed Imamović	Communism; Democratic socialism
Liberal Democratic Party; Liberalno demokratska stranka	LDS	Hasib Salkić	Liberalism
Party of Justice and Trust; Stranka pravde i povjerenja	SPP	Živko Budimir	Social conservatism
Party of Democratic Activity; Stranka demokratske aktivnosti	A-SDA	Nermin Ogrešević	Bosnian nationalism Islamic democracy National conservatism
Independent Bosnian-Herzegovinian List; Nezavisna bosanskohercegovačka lista	NBL	Ibrahim Hadžibajrić	Bosnian nationalism Conservatism
Croatian Christian Democrats; Hrvatski demokršćani	HD	Petar Milić	Christian democracy
Croat People's Union; Hrvatska narodna zajednica	HNZ	Milenko Brkić	Croatian nationalism Conservatism
Croatian Right Bloc; Hrvatski pravaški blok	HPB	Željko Koroman	Croatian nationalism Conservativism
Democratic Alliance of Greens; Demokratski savez Zelenih	DSZ	Unknown	Green politics
Democratic Party of Pensioners; Demokratska stranka penzionera	DSP	Alojz Knezović	Pensioners' interests
Democratic Party of Republika Srpska; Demokratska stranka Republike Srpske	DP RS	Dragan Čavić	National conservatism
Democratic Socialist Party; Demokratska socijalistička partija	DSP	Nebojša Radmanović	Democratic socialism
League of Communists; Savez komunista	SK	President of the Presidency	Communism; Marxism-Leninism
League of Socialist Youth; Savez socijalističke omladine	SSO	Rasim Kadić	Liberalism
Muslim Bosniak Organisation; Muslimanska bošnjačka organizacija	MBO	Adil Zulfikarpašić	Muslim minority politics
National Democratic Party; Narodna demokratska stranka	NDS	Krsto Jandrić	National conservatism
New Croatian Initiative; Nova hrvatska inicijativa	NHI	Krešimir Zubak	Christian democracy Croatian nationalism
Radical Party of Republika Srpska; Radikalna stranka Republike Srpske	RSRS	Unknown	Serbian nationalism
Republican Party; Republikanska stranka	RS	Stjepan Kljuić	Secularism
Serb National Alliance; Srpski narodni savez	SNS RS	Biljana Plavšić	Catch-all party Serbian nationalism
Serbian Radical Party of Republika Srpska; Srpska radikalna stranka Republike Srpske	SRS RS	Milanko Mihajlica	Serbian nationalism National conservatism
Social Democratic Union; Socijaldemokratska unija	SDU	Nermin Pećanac	Social democracy Secularism
Union of Reform Forces of Yugoslavia; Savez reformskih snaga	SRSJ	Ante Marković	Social liberalism Social democracy
Union of Bosnia-Herzegovina Social Democrats; Unija bosansko-hercegovačkih socijaldemokrata	UBSD	Sead Avdić	Social democracy

== See also ==
- Politics of Bosnia and Herzegovina
- Elections in Bosnia and Herzegovina
- List of political parties in Republika Srpska
