= 2026 Herzegovina-Neretva Canton parliamentary election =

Canton election in Bosnia and Herzegovina

2026 Herzegovina-Neretva parliamentary election
- 4 October 2026
- All 30 seats in the Assembly of the Herzegovina-Neretva Canton; 16 seats needed for a majority
- Turnout: 45.45% (▼10.17pp)
Party	Leader	Vote %	Seats	+/–
HDZ BIH coalition (Note: HKDU–HDU–HRAST)	Marko Novak	37.73	13	+2
SDA	Džafer Alić	25.10	8	+1
SDP BiH	Ivor Perić	9.41	3	0
HDZ 1990–HSS BiH	Marko Ćurčić	5.49	2	−1
HRS	Silvio Bubalo	5.05	2	0
NES–PDA–NPD	Semir Drljević	3.88	1	0
DF–GS	Arman Zalihić	3.81	1	−1
This lists parties that won seats. See the complete results below.
Results by municipality.
Prime Minister before	Prime Minister after
Marija Buhač; HDZ BiH	TBD

Parliamentary elections were held in the Herzegovina-Neretva Canton on 4 October 2026 as part of the 2026 Federation of Bosnia and Herzegovina general election to elect the members of the Assembly of the Herzegovina-Neretva Canton. Prior to the elections, the Government consisted of a coalition between the Croatian Democratic Union (HDZ BiH), the Party of Democratic Action (SDA) and the Social Democratic Party (SDP BiH).

The electoral threshold required to win a seat in the Assembly is 3%. A two-thirds majority, or at least 20 representative votes, is required to confirm the appointment of the Government of the Herzegovina-Neretva Canton. HDZ BiH and SDA gained a total of 21 seats in the election, giving them a sufficient majority to appoint a government.

== Results ==
Party	Votes	%	Seats	+/–
Croatian Democratic Union coalition	31,563	37.73	13	+2
Party of Democratic Action	20,994	25.10	8	+1
Social Democratic Party	7,875	9.41	3	0
Croatian Democratic Union 1990–Croatian Peasant Party (Note: HDZ 1990 won both seats.)	4,588	5.49	2	-1
Croatian Republican Party	4,225	5.05	2	0
People's European Union–Movement of Democratic Action–Forward!	3,243	3.88	1	0
Democratic Front–Civic Alliance (Note: DF won the seat.)	3,187	3.81	1	-1
Party for Bosnia and Herzegovina	2,019	2.41	0	0
People and Justice–Pensioners' Party of Bosnia and Herzegovina	1,564	1.87	0	-1
Hum Force of the Rightists (Note: HSP BiH–HSP AS BiH–HSP HB i BiH–HUM)	1,304	1.56	0	0
Croatian Spring	1,295	1.55	0	0
Our Party	883	1.06	0	0
Alliance of Independent Social Democrats	456	0.55	0	0
Union for a Better Future	352	0.42	0	0
People's Power	96	0.11	0	0
Total	83,644	100.00	30	0
Valid votes	83,644	92.86		
Invalid/blank votes	6,428	7.14		
Total votes	90,072	100.00		
Registered voters/turnout	198,182	45.45		
Source: CEC
