= 2018 Federation of Bosnia and Herzegovina general election =

Entity election in Bosnia and Herzegovina

- 7 October 2018
- 98 seats in the House of Representatives; 50 seats needed for a majority
- Turnout: 51.83%
Party	Leader	Vote %	Seats	+/–
SDA	Bakir Izetbegović	25.25	27	−2
SDP BiH	Nermin Nikšić	14.53	16	+4
HDZ BiH and allies	Dragan Čović	14.35	16	+4
DF–GS	Željko Komšić	9.36	10	−4
SBB	Fahrudin Radončić	7.05	8	−8
NS	Predrag Kojović	5.09	6	+5
PDA	Mirsad Kukić	3.77	4	New
NB	Senad Šepić	3.49	4	New
A-SDA	Nermin Ogrešević	2.74	2	0
HDZ 1990–HSP	Ilija Cvitanović	2.56	2	−2
NiP	Elmedin Konaković	2.32	2	New
LS BiH	Elvira Abdić-Jelenović	0.76	1	0
This lists parties that won seats. See the complete results below.
Prime Minister before	Prime Minister after
Fadil Novalić; SDA	Fadil Novalić; SDA

General elections were held in the Federation of Bosnia and Herzegovina on 7 October 2018 as part of the Bosnian general elections. Voters elected the 98 members of the House of Representatives of the Federation of Bosnia and Herzegovina and the assemblies of the cantons of the Federation of Bosnia and Herzegovina.

The Party of Democratic Action (SDA) emerged as the largest party in the House of Representatives, winning 27 of the 98 seats. The Social Democratic Party and the Croatian Democratic Union (HDZ BiH) each won 16 seats, with the former regaining some of its voters it lost in the previous general election in 2014. The Democratic Front won 10 seats, down four from 2014. The Union for a Better Future saw a significant decline, winning 8 seats, down eight from the previous election. Our Party significantly improved its result, winning 6 seats, up by five from 2014.

Fadil Novalić remained in office as Prime Minister, since the parties never were able to form a new government, most notably due to constant quarrel between the SDA and the HDZ BiH.

== Electoral system ==
=== Presidency ===
The president of the Federation of Bosnia and Herzegovina and the two vice-presidents are not elected by direct election: The first chamber of the Federal Parliament, the House of Peoples, nominates candidates for the presidency and the vice-presidencies, followed by the second chamber, the House of Representatives, must confirm this nomination by election. Subsequently, confirmation by the majority of the delegates of all three constitutive ethnic groups in the House of Peoples is required.

=== House of Representatives ===
The House of Representatives of the Federation of Bosnia and Herzegovina has a total of 98 members who are elected by proportional representation. The election takes place in 12 multi-person constituencies with entity-wide balancing mandates. In the Federal House of Representatives, each constitutive ethnic group should be represented by at least four members. The threshold is three percent.

=== Cantonal Assemblies ===
The assemblies of the 10 cantons of the Federation are also elected. The election is based on proportional representation with a threshold of three percent. The individual cantonal assemblies send members to the House of Peoples.

== Results ==
Results of the cantonal elections

=== House of Representatives ===
Party	Votes	%	Seats		
Party	Votes	%	Direct	Comp.	Total
Party of Democratic Action	252,817	25.25	22	5	27
Social Democratic Party	145,458	14.53	12	4	16
HDZ–HSS–HSP–HNS–HSP AS–HDU BiH–HSS SR	143,704	14.35	13	3	16
Democratic Front–Civic Alliance	93,708	9.36	9	1	10
Union for a Better Future	70,571	7.05	5	3	8
Our Party	50,947	5.09	1	5	6
Movement of Democratic Action	37,731	3.77	3	1	4
Independent Bloc	34,913	3.49	1	3	4
Party of Democratic Activity	27,396	2.74	2	0	2
HDZ 1990–HSP	25,663	2.56	2	0	2
People and Justice	23,222	2.32	2	0	2
Party for Bosnia and Herzegovina	23,007	2.30	0	0	0
Independent Bosnian-Herzegovinian List	15,113	1.51	0	0	0
Bosnian-Herzegovinian Patriotic Party	14,022	1.40	0	0	0
Pensioners' Party	8,152	0.81	0	0	0
Labour Party	7,656	0.76	1	0	1
Bosnian Party	7,092	0.71	0	0	0
Croatian Republican Party	6,670	0.67	0	0	0
Serb List	5,244	0.52	0	0	0
LDS za Boljitak	2,158	0.22	0	0	0
Democratic People's Union	1,865	0.19	0	0	0
Croatian Party BiH	1,481	0.15	0	0	0
Serb Progressive Party	896	0.09	0	0	0
Communist Party	593	0.06	0	0	0
Stari Grad Union	474	0.05	0	0	0
Democratic Party	367	0.04	0	0	0
First Party	258	0.03	0	0	0
Union for New Politics	155	0.02	0	0	0
Total	1,001,333	100.00	73	25	98
Valid votes	1,001,333	92.28			
Invalid/blank votes	83,791	7.72			
Total votes	1,085,124	100.00			
Registered voters/turnout	2,093,784	51.83			
Source: CEC

=== Assemblies of the Cantons ===
==== Una-Sana ====
Una-Sana
Graph of the party split among 30 seats.
Party	Votes	%	Seats
SDA	26,255	28.45	9
A-SDA–POMAK	21,963	23.80	8
SDP	9,880	10.70	4
Labour Party	7,357	7.97	3
SBB BiH	6,905	7.48	2
DF	6,695	7.25	2
NB	4,108	4.45	1
NS	3,535	3.83	1
DNZ BiH	2,038	2.21	0
NiP	1,288	1.40	0
Serb List	671	0.73	0
Others	1,604	1.74	–
Total	92,299	100.00	30
Valid votes	92,299	91.42	
Invalid votes	5,398	5.35	
Blank votes	3,270	3.24	
Total votes	100,967	100.00	
Registered voters/turnout	254,621	39.65	
Source: CEC

==== Posavina ====
Posavina
Graph of the party split among 21 seats.
Party	Votes	%	Seats
HDZ BiH (Note: In coalition with HSS, HKDU, HSP-HNS, HSP-Dr-AS, HDU, and HSS-SR)	9,025	50.96	11
HDZ 1990	2,452	13.85	3
SDA	1,843	10.41	2
Posavinian Party	1,338	7.56	2
SDP	869	4.91	1
SBB BiH	649	3.66	1
PDA	538	3.04	1
DF	498	2.81	0
Serb List	390	2.20	0
Others	108	0.61	–
Total	17,710	100.00	21
Valid votes	17,710	93.98	
Invalid votes	755	4.01	
Blank votes	379	2.01	
Total votes	18,844	100.00	
Registered voters/turnout	40,116	46.97	
Source: CEC

==== Tuzla ====
Tuzla
Graph of the party split among 35 seats.
Party	Votes	%	Seats
SDP	49,326	23.42	10
SDA	49,074	23.30	9
PDA	37,465	17.79	7
DF	14,546	6.91	3
SBB BiH	11,741	5.58	2
NS	9,006	4.28	2
SBiH	8,517	4.04	2
NBL	5,847	2.78	0
BPS	5,562	2.64	0
HDZ BiH	5,480	2.60	0
A-SDA	4,548	2.16	0
BOSS	2,643	1.26	0
NB	2,637	1.25	0
SPU BiH	1,716	0.81	0
LDS	1,171	0.56	0
Others	1,303	0.62	–
Total	210,582	100.00	35
Valid votes	210,582	92.70	
Invalid votes	9,014	3.97	
Blank votes	7,576	3.33	
Total votes	227,172	100.00	
Registered voters/turnout	429,853	52.85	
Source: CEC

==== Zenica-Doboj ====
Zenica-Doboj
Graph of the party split among 35 seats.
Party	Votes	%	Seats
SDA	45,606	28.11	11
SDP	26,674	16.44	6
NB	19,540	12.04	5
SBB BiH	12,857	7.92	3
HDZ BiH	11,564	7.13	3
DF	11,266	6.94	3
A-SDA	7,288	4.49	2
SBiH	6,381	3.93	1
NS	5,212	3.21	1
SPU BiH	4,171	2.57	0
BPS	3,233	1.99	0
NBL	2,392	1.47	0
PDA	1,875	1.16	0
HDZ 1990	1,054	0.65	0
NiP	566	0.35	0
Serb List	179	0.11	0
Liberal party	108	0.07	0
Others	2,296	1.41	–
Total	162,262	100.00	35
Valid votes	162,262	92.28	
Invalid votes	7,852	4.47	
Blank votes	5,726	3.26	
Total votes	175,840	100.00	
Registered voters/turnout	329,495	53.37	
Source: CEC

==== Bosnian-Podrinje Goražde ====
Bosnian-Podrinje Goražde
Graph of the party split among 25 seats.
Party	Votes	%	Seats
SDA	2,910	19.40	5
Liberal Party	1,942	12.95	4
NBL	1,924	12.83	3
SBiH	1,320	8.80	2
SBB BiH	1,314	8.76	2
SDP	1,018	6.79	2
DF	904	6.03	2
Goraždanska priča (Note: Coalition of BNS, KP BiH, LDS BiH, NSRzB)	835	5.57	2
NB	769	5.13	1
NS	710	4.73	1
A-SDA	567	3.78	1
NiP	406	2.71	0
BPS	282	1.88	0
Others	97	0.65	–
Total	14,998	100.00	25
Valid votes	14,998	95.29	
Invalid votes	455	2.89	
Blank votes	286	1.82	
Total votes	15,739	100.00	
Registered voters/turnout	23,502	66.97	
Source: CEC

==== Central Bosnia ====
Central Bosnia
Graph of the party split among 30 seats.
Party	Votes	%	Seats
SDA	36,358	31.47	10
HDZ BiH	33,982	29.41	9
SDP	16,135	13.96	5
SBB BiH	7,402	6.41	2
DF	5,783	5.00	2
HDZ 1990	4,549	3.94	1
NB	3,478	3.01	1
SBiH	2,823	2.44	0
A-SDA	1,322	1.14	0
PDA	841	0.73	0
SPU BiH	1,716	1.49	0
Others	1,157	1.00	–
Total	115,546	100.00	30
Valid votes	115,546	92.56	
Invalid votes	5,083	4.07	
Blank votes	4,209	3.37	
Total votes	124,838	100.00	
Registered voters/turnout	226,002	55.24	
Source: CEC

==== Herzegovina-Neretva ====
Herzegovina-Neretva
Graph of the party split among 30 seats.
Party	Votes	%	Seats
HDZ BiH	38,404	37.87	13
SDA	23,159	22.84	8
SDP	9,716	9.58	3
HDZ 1990	7,079	6.98	2
SBB BiH	6,196	6.11	2
DF	4,232	4.17	1
HRS	3,266	3.22	1
NS	1,865	1.84	0
SBiH	1,849	1.82	0
Serb List	1,534	1.51	0
NB	1,358	1.34	0
BPS	1,307	1.29	0
Others	1,445	1.42	–
Total	101,410	100.00	30
Valid votes	101,410	94.15	
Invalid votes	3,620	3.36	
Blank votes	2,677	2.49	
Total votes	107,707	100.00	
Registered voters/turnout	195,693	55.04	
Source: CEC

==== West Herzegovina ====
West Herzegovina
Graph of the party split among 23 seats.
Party	Votes	%	Seats
HDZ BiH (Note: In coalition with HKDU)	23,508	65.21	16
HDZ 1990	3,884	10.77	3
HRS	3,208	8.90	2
HSP Dr. Ante Stračević	1,882	5.22	1
HSP	1,316	3.65	1
HSP-HNS	357	0.99	0
HSS	879	2.44	0
NSRzB	713	1.98	0
Others	300	0.83	–
Total	36,047	100.00	23
Valid votes	36,047	95.76	
Invalid votes	1,227	3.26	
Blank votes	370	0.98	
Total votes	37,644	100.00	
Registered voters/turnout	72,947	51.60	
Source: CEC

==== Sarajevo ====
Sarajevo
Graph of the party split among 35 seats.
Party	Votes	%	Seats
SDA	54,066	24.85	10
NiP	29,821	13.71	6
NS	28,386	13.05	5
SDP	22,212	10.21	4
SBB BiH	20,304	9.33	4
DF	13,483	6.20	3
NBL	10,534	4.84	2
BOSS	7,955	3.66	1
BPS	5,562	2.56	0
GS	4,022	1.85	0
NB	3,518	1.62	0
USD BH	3,041	1.40	0
SBiH	2,733	1.26	0
A-SDA	2,438	1.12	0
HDZ BiH	2,371	1.09	0
Coalition for the Sarajevo Canton	2,086	0.96	0
SPU BiH	1,335	0.61	0
Others	3,707	1.70	–
Total	217,574	100.00	35
Valid votes	217,574	93.57	
Invalid votes	9,440	4.06	
Blank votes	5,500	2.37	
Total votes	232,514	100.00	
Registered voters/turnout	417,852	55.65	
Source: CEC

==== Canton 10 ====
10
Graph of the party split among 25 seats.
Party	Votes	%	Seats
HDZ BiH (Note: In coalition with HSS, HKDU, HSP-Dr-AS, HDU)	8,438	30.77	8
HDZ 1990	3,791	13.82	4
Serb List (Note: Coalition of SNSD, DNS, and SP RS)	3,328	12.14	3
HNL	3,037	11.07	3
SDA	1,981	7.22	2
SNS RS	1,262	4.60	1
NSRzB	1,117	4.07	1
HRS	1,007	3.67	1
Dalić Draško (Ind.)	1,007	3.67	1
SDP	827	3.02	1
DOS–HLL	479	1.75	0
DF	479	1.75	0
HSP	414	1.51	0
Others	257	0.94	–
Total	27,424	100.00	25
Valid votes	27,424	94.40	
Invalid votes	947	3.26	
Blank votes	681	2.34	
Total votes	29,052	100.00	
Registered voters/turnout	65,041	44.67	
Source: CEC

== See also ==
- 2018 Bosnian general election
- 2018 Republika Srpska general election
