= 2026 Federation of Bosnia and Herzegovina general election =

Entity election in Bosnia and Herzegovina

- 4 October 2026
- 98 seats in the House of Representatives; 50 seats needed for a majority
- Turnout: 40.71% ▼9.35 pp
Party	Leader	Vote %	Seats	+/–
SDA	Bakir Izetbegović	30.46	31	+5
SDP BiH	Nermin Nikšić	15.12	16	+1
HDZ BiH and allies (Note: HDZ–HSSSR–HSP–HKDU–HSPAS–HDU–HSPHB–HRAST)	Dragan Čović	14.07	15	0
SBiH	Semir Efendić	8.98	9	+5
NiP–SD BiH–SPU	Elmedin Konaković	6.48	7	0
DF–GS	Željko Komšić	6.02	6	−6
NES–PDA–NPD	Nermin Ogrešević	4.11	4	−2
NS	Sabina Ćudić	3.82	4	−2
HDZ 1990 coalition (Note: Coalition with HRS, HSS BiH and HDS.)	Ilija Cvitanović	3.31	3	−1
BHI	Fuad Kasumović	1.10	1	0
POMAK	Elvedin Sedić	0.77	1	0
HNP	Ivan Vukadin	0.60	1	0
This lists parties that won seats. See the complete results below.

Prime Minister before
Nermin Nikšić; SDP

The Federation of Bosnia and Herzegovina held general elections on 4 October 2026 as part of the Bosnian general elections. Voters elected the 98 members of the House of Representatives of the Federation of Bosnia and Herzegovina, as well as the assemblies of the ten cantons of the Federation of Bosnia and Herzegovina.

The election was expected to determine whether the governing coalition led by the Troika alliance and the Croatian Democratic Union would retain its parliamentary majority in the Federal House of Representatives.

== Electoral system ==
=== Presidency ===
The president of the Federation of Bosnia and Herzegovina and the two vice presidents are not elected by direct vote. Candidates for the presidency and vice presidencies are nominated by the House of Peoples of the Federation of Bosnia and Herzegovina. The House of Representatives must then confirm the nominations by election. Final confirmation requires majority support from delegates of all three constituent peoples in the House of Peoples.

=== House of Representatives ===
The House of Representatives of the Federation of Bosnia and Herzegovina consists of 98 members elected by proportional representation. Elections are held in 12 multi-member constituencies with compensatory mandates allocated at the entity-wide level. Each constituent people must be represented by at least four members in the House of Representatives. The electoral threshold is three percent.

=== Cantonal assemblies ===
The assemblies of the ten cantons of the Federation of Bosnia and Herzegovina are also elected by proportional representation with a three percent electoral threshold. Members of the cantonal assemblies subsequently elect delegates to the House of Peoples of the Federation of Bosnia and Herzegovina.

== Opinion polling ==
Publication date	Pollster	Votes														
Publication date	Pollster	Votes	SDA	HDZ BiH	DF	SDP BiH	NiP	NES	NS	SBiH	SN	PDA	HDZ 1990	Others	Undecided	Lead
27 Sep 2025	Ipsos	355	18.0%	8.0%	8.0%	7.0%	6.0%	5.0%	4.0%	2.0%	2.0%	2.0%	1.0%	2%	16%	10.0

== Results ==
=== House of Representatives ===
Party	Votes	%	+/–	Seats			
Party	Votes	%	+/–	Direct	Comp.	Total	+/−
Party of Democratic Action	243,831	30.46	+6.07	24	7	31	+5
Social Democratic Party	121,009	15.12	+1.67	12	4	16	+1
Croatian Democratic Union and allies	112,576	14.07	+0.68	12	3	15	0
Party for Bosnia and Herzegovina	71,873	8.98	+5.25	6	3	9	+5
People and Justice–Social Democrats–Pensioners' Party	51,844	6.48	–0.41	4	3	7	0
Democratic Front–Civic Alliance	48,195	6.02	–5.03	4	2	6	-6
People's European Union–Movement of Democratic Action–Forward	32,865	4.11	–0.22	3	1	4	-2
Our Party	30,585	3.82	–1.38	2	2	4	-2
Croatian Democratic Union 1990 coalition	26,520	3.31	+0.58	3	0	3	-1
Union for a Better Future	10,270	1.28	–1.55	0	0	0	0
Bosnian-Herzegovinian Greens	9,338	1.17	+1.11	0	0	0	0
Bosnian-Herzegovinian Initiative	8,838	1.10	–0.76	1	0	1	0
People's Power	7,859	0.98	New	0	0	0	New
Movement for a Modern and Active Krajina	6,135	0.77	+0.31	1	0	1	0
Croatian National Shift	4,842	0.60	+0.05	1	0	1	0
Red Lines	3,615	0.45	New	0	0	0	New
Labour Party	3,474	0.43	+0.05	0	0	0	0
Alliance of Independent Social Democrats	3,273	0.41	+0.08	0	0	0	0
Croatian Independent List	1,801	0.23	New	0	0	0	New
Republicans of Bosnia and Herzegovina	1,638	0.20	New	0	0	0	New
Total	800,381	100.00	–	73	25	98	0
Valid votes	800,381	91.72					
Invalid/blank votes	72,292	8.28					
Total votes	872,673	100.00					
Registered voters/turnout	2,143,444	40.71					
Source: CEC

=== Assemblies of the Cantons ===
==== Una-Sana ====
Una-Sana
Party	Votes	%	+/–	Seats	+/–
SDA	21,993	30.46	+5.07	10	+2
NES–PDA	14,105	19.54	-4.51	6	-2
SDP BiH	9,373	12.98	+3.62	4	+1
POMAK	6,011	8.33	-0.37	3	0
SBiH	3,856	5.34	+1.74	2	+1
DF–GS	3,725	5.16	-3.55	2	-1
LS BiH	3,418	4.73	+0.43	2	+1
NiP–SPU	3,413	4.73	-0.03	1	-1
NS	1,839	2.55	-0.65	–	-1
BH Zeleni	1,497	2.07	New	–	New
Others	2,966	4.11	-2.80	–	–
Total	72,196	100.00	–	30	–
Valid votes	72,196	90.60			
Invalid/blank votes	7,494	9.40			
Total votes	79,690	100.00			
Registered voters/turnout	267,590	29.78			
Source: CEC

==== Posavina ====
Posavina
Party	Votes	%	+/–	Seats	+/–
HDZ BiH coalition	7,263	56.95	+4.24	13	+1
SDA	1,758	13.78	+2.65	3	0
Independent Joso Oršolić	778	6.10	New	1	New
SDP BiH	621	4.87	-1.48	1	0
HDZ 1990 coalition	569	4.46	-3.31	1	-1
HRS	548	4.30	+0.48	1	0
SBiH	422	3.31	New	1	New
HSP BiH	343	2.69	+0.18	–	0
Others	452	3.54	-12.18	–	–
Total	12,754	100.00	–	21	–
Valid votes	12,754	93.52			
Invalid/blank votes	883	6.48			
Total votes	13,637	100.00			
Registered voters/turnout	40,655	33.54			
Source: CEC

==== Tuzla ====
Tuzla
Party	Votes	%	+/–	Seats	+/–
SDA	58,338	36.35	+6.14	14	+1
SDP BiH	28,776	17.93	-0.54	7	-1
DF–GS	14,104	8.79	-1.51	3	-1
NiP–SPU	10,830	6.75	+0.88	3	+1
SBiH	8,999	5.61	+0.25	2	0
NES–PDA –NPD	7,768	4.84	-5.58	2	-1
NS	7,648	4.76	+1.24	2	+1
SBB	6,403	3.99	+1.47	1	+1
BH Zeleni	5,806	3.62	+1.47	1	+1
SD BiH	4,186	2.61	-1.38	–	-2
Others	7,652	4.77	-2.35	–	–
Total	160,510	100.00	–	35	–
Valid votes	160,510	91.56			
Invalid/blank votes	14,803	8.44			
Total votes	175,313	100.00			
Registered voters/turnout	432,761	40.51			
Source: CEC

==== Zenica-Doboj ====
Zenica-Doboj
Party	Votes	%	+/–	Seats	+/–
SDA	44,882	35.93	+6.70	15	+4
SDP BiH	16,881	13.52	+0.70	5	0
SBiH	9,878	7.91	+5.35	3	+3
BHI	9,229	7.39	-7.28	3	-2
DF–GS	8,774	7.02	-1.99	3	0
HDZ BiH and allies	6,443	5.16	-1.83	2	-1
SN	6,166	4.94	New	2	New
NiP–SPU	3,920	3.14	-4.85	1	-2
NS	3,760	3.01	-0.15	1	0
HDZ 1990 coalition	3,405	2.73	New	–	New
Others	11,567	9.26	+5.81	–	–
Total	124,905	100.00	–	35	–
Valid votes	124,905	92.29			
Invalid/blank votes	10,431	7.71			
Total votes	135,336	100.00			
Registered voters/turnout	330,533	40.94			
Source: CEC

==== Bosnian-Podrinje Goražde ====
Bosnian-Podrinje Goražde
Party	Votes	%	+/–	Seats	+/–
SDA	1,711	14.02	-1.14	4	-1
NiP–SPU	1,529	12.53	+2.24	3	0
PERSPEKTIVA	1,301	10.66	New	3	New
NPI	955	7.83	+1.30	2	0
SDP BiH	893	7.32	-0.77	2	0
SBiH	719	5.89	-1.89	2	0
SN	626	5.13	New	1	New
SBB	583	4.78	+1.07	1	0
NGL	459	3.76	-0.94	1	0
DF–GS	449	3.68	-0.54	1	0
NES–PDA	417	3.42	-3.09	1	-1
GN	403	3.30	New	1	New
SNP	396	3.25	New	1	New
BNS	380	3.11	-1.53	1	0
New Beginning	372	3.05	-7.09	1	-2
Others	1,008	8.26	-9.99	–	–
Total	12,201	100.00	–	25	–
Valid votes	12,201	92.71			
Invalid/blank votes	959	7.29			
Total votes	13,160	100.00			
Registered voters/turnout	22,117	59.50			
Source: CEC

==== Central Bosnia ====
Central Bosnia
Party	Votes	%	+/–	Seats	+/–
SDA	32,214	33.98	+0.58	11	0
HDZ BiH and allies	24,038	25.36	-1.74	8	-1
SDP BiH	17,102	18.04	+6.77	6	+2
HDZ 1990 coalition	6,958	7.34	+2.40	2	0
SBiH	5,836	6.16	+4.39	2	+2
NiP	3,828	4.04	-3.71	1	-1
DF–GS	1,956	2.06	-4.19	–	-2
NS	1,584	1.67	+0.26	–	0
Others	1,286	1.36	-4.74	–	–
Total	94,802	100.00	–	30	–
Valid votes	94,802	91.81			
Invalid/blank votes	8,455	8.19			
Total votes	103,257	100.00			
Registered voters/turnout	231,016	44.70			
Source: CEC

==== Herzegovina-Neretva ====
Herzegovina-Neretva
Party	Votes	%	Seats	+/–
HDZ BiH and allies	31,563	37.73	13	+2
SDA	20,994	25.10	8	+1
SDP BiH	7,875	9.41	3	0
HDZ 1990 coalition	4,588	5.49	2	-1
HRS	4,225	5.05	2	0
NES–PDA–NPD	3,243	3.88	1	0
DF–GS	3,187	3.81	1	-1
SBiH	2,019	2.41	–	0
NiP–SPU	1,564	1.87	–	-1
Others	4,386	5.24	–	–
Total	83,644	100.00	30	–
Valid votes	83,644	92.86		
Invalid/blank votes	6,428	7.14		
Total votes	90,072	100.00		
Registered voters/turnout	198,183	45.45		
Source: CEC

==== West Herzegovina ====
West Herzegovina
Party	Votes	%	Seats	+/–
HDZ BiH	21,534	72.59	17	+3
HDZ 1990 coalition	2,921	9.85	2	-2
HRS	2,398	8.08	2	0
HSP BiH	1,300	4.38	1	0
HSP AS coalition	1,257	4.24	1	-1
SDP BiH	257	0.87	–	0
Total	29,667	100.00	23	–
Valid votes	29,667	93.72		
Invalid/blank votes	1,988	6.28		
Total votes	31,655	100.00		
Registered voters/turnout	77,362	40.92		
Source: CEC

==== Sarajevo ====
Sarajevo
Party	Votes	%	+/–	Seats	+/–
SDA	42,252	23.92	+5.56	9	+2
SDP BiH	38,214	21.63	+5.88	9	+3
SBiH	33,664	19.06	+6.20	7	+2
NiP	24,310	13.76	-4.47	5	-2
NS	12,360	7.00	-4.82	3	-2
DF–GS	10,921	6.18	-2.89	2	-2
Others	14,920	8.45	-5.57	–	-1
Total	176,641	100.00	–	35	–
Valid votes	176,641	93.64			
Invalid/blank votes	11,996	6.36			
Total votes	188,637	100.00			
Registered voters/turnout	429,336	43.94			
Source: CEC

==== Canton 10 ====
10
Party	Votes	%	Seats	+/–
HDZ BiH	6,821	27.73	7	+2
HNP	4,824	19.61	5	0
HDZ 1990	3,687	14.99	4	0
SNSD–SP–SPS	2,282	9.28	3	+1
HNL	1,833	7.45	2	0
SNS FBiH	1,148	4.67	1	0
SDA	985	4.00	1	-1
SBiH	874	3.55	1	+1
SDP BiH	857	3.48	1	-1
Others	1,291	5.25	–	-1
Total	24,602	100.00	25	–
Valid votes	24,602	93.12		
Invalid/blank votes	1,818	6.88		
Total votes	26,420	100.00		
Registered voters/turnout	66,940	39.47		
Source: CEC

== See also ==
- 2026 Bosnian general election
- 2026 Republika Srpska general election
