= List of mayors in Bosnia and Herzegovina =

This is a list of current mayors of cities and towns in Bosnia and Herzegovina. There are 142 directly elected mayors and 3 mayors elected indirectly: the mayor of Sarajevo appointed by the Sarajevo City Council, the mayor of Mostar appointed by the Mostar City Council and the mayor of Brčko appointed by the Assembly of Brčko District.

== Key ==
Results of the 2024 municipal elections

Mayors by political party
Party	Mayors
SNSD	48
SDA	33
HDZ BiH	20
SDS	10
SDP BiH	9
Independent	5
NiP	4
PDP	2
NS	1
SBiH	1
NES	1
POMAK	1
SDBiH	1
BHI	1
PDA	1
SRS RS	1
HSS SR	1
SP	1
DEMOS	1
RNS	1
US	1
HNP	1
NPS	1

== List ==
Mayors of cities in Bosnia and Herzegovina
City	Current Mayor	Party
Banja Luka	Draško Stanivuković	Party of Democratic Progress
Bihać	Elvedin Sedić	Movement for a Modern and Active Krajina
Bijeljina	Ljubiša Petrović	Serb Democratic Party
Bosanska Krupa	Armin Halitović	Social Democratic Party
Cazin	Nermin Ogrešević	People's European Union
Čapljina	Iva Raguž	Croatian Democratic Union
Derventa	Igor Žunić	Alliance of Independent Social Democrats
Doboj	Boris Jerinić	Alliance of Independent Social Democrats
Goražde	Ernest Imamović	Social Democratic Party
Gračanica	Sadmir Džebo	Party of Democratic Action
Gradačac	Hajrudin Mehanović	Party of Democratic Action
Gradiška	Zoran Adžić	Alliance of Independent Social Democrats
Istočno Sarajevo	Ljubiša Ćosić	Alliance of Independent Social Democrats
Konjic	Osman Ćatić	Party of Democratic Action
Laktaši	Miroslav Bojić	Alliance of Independent Social Democrats
Livno	Darko Čondrić	Croatian Democratic Union
Lukavac	Edin Delić	Social Democrats
Ljubuški	Vedran Markotić	Croatian Democratic Union
Novi Travnik	Stjepan Dujo	Croatian Democratic Union
Orašje	Marijan Oršolić	Croatian Democratic Union
Prijedor	Slobodan Javor	Alliance of Independent Social Democrats
Prnjavor	Darko Tomaš	Alliance of Independent Social Democrats
Srebrenik	Adnan Bjelić	People and Justice
Stolac	Stjepan Bošković	Croatian Democratic Union
Široki Brijeg	Ivo Pavković	Croatian Democratic Union
Trebinje	Mirko Ćurić	Alliance of Independent Social Democrats
Tuzla	Zijad Lugavić	Social Democratic Party
Visoko	Mirza Ganić	Party of Democratic Action
Zavidovići	Erna Merdić-Smailhodžić	Party of Democratic Action
Zenica	Fuad Kasumović	Bosnian-Herzegovinian Initiative
Zvornik	Bojan Ivanović	Alliance of Independent Social Democrats
Živinice	Began Muhić	Party of Democratic Action

Mayors of cities in Bosnia and Herzegovina elected by city councils or assemblies
City	Mayor	Party	Elected by
Brčko	Siniša Milić	Alliance of Independent Social Democrats	Assembly of Brčko District
Mostar	Mario Kordić	Croatian Democratic Union	Mostar City Council
Sarajevo	Samir Avdić	People and Justice	Sarajevo City Council

Mayors of municipalities in Bosnia and Herzegovina
City / town	Current Mayor	Party
Banovići	Mehmed Hasanović	Movement of Democratic Action
Berkovići	Bojan Samardžić	Serb Democratic Party
Bileća	Miodrag Parežanin	Alliance of Independent Social Democrats
Brod	Milan Zečević	Alliance of Independent Social Democrats
Bosanski Petrovac	Mahmut Jukić	Party of Democratic Action
Bosansko Grahovo	Smiljka Radlović	Independent
Bratunac	Lazar Prodanović	Alliance of Independent Social Democrats
Breza	Vedad Jusić	Party of Democratic Action
Bugojno	Edin Mašić	Social Democratic Party
Busovača	Asim Mekić	Party of Democratic Action
Bužim	Mersudin Nanić	Party of Democratic Action
Centar, Sarajevo	Srđan Mandić	Our Party
Čajniče	Miroslav Furtula	Serbian Radical Party
Čelić	Admir Hrustanović	Social Democratic Party
Čelinac	Vlado Gligorić	Alliance of Independent Social Democrats
Čitluk	Marin Radišić	Croatian Democratic Union
Doboj East	Kemal Bratić	Party of Democratic Action
Doboj South	Mirnes Tukić	Party of Democratic Action
Dobretići	Ivo Čakarić	Croatian Peasant Party of Stjepan Radić
Domaljevac-Šamac	Stjepan Piljić	Croatian Democratic Union
Donji Vakuf	Senad Selimović	Social Democratic Party
Donji Žabar	Pero Pavlović	Alliance of Independent Social Democrats
Drvar	Dušica Runić	Alliance of Independent Social Democrats
Foča	Milan Vukadinović	Alliance of Independent Social Democrats
Foča-Ustikolina	Mujo Sofradžija	Independent
Fojnica	Sabahudin Klisura	Party of Democratic Action
Gacko	Vukota Govedarica	Serb Democratic Party
Glamoč	Nebojša Radivojša	Alliance of Independent Social Democrats
Goražde	Ernest Imamović	Social Democratic Party
Gornji Vakuf-Uskoplje	Esmin Hajdarević	Party of Democratic Action
Grude	Ljubo Grizelj	Croatian Democratic Union
Hadžići	Eldar Čomor	Party of Democratic Action
Han Pijesak	Slobodan Đurić	Alliance of Independent Social Democrats
Ilidža	Nermin Muzur	People and Justice
Ilijaš	Amar Dovadžija	People and Justice
Istočna Ilidža	Marinko Božović	Serb Democratic Party
Istočni Drvar	Milka Ivanković	Alliance of Independent Social Democrats
Istočni Mostar	Božo Sjeran	Independent
Istočni Stari Grad	Bojo Gašanović	Serb Democratic Party
Istočno Novo Sarajevo	Jovan Katić	Alliance of Independent Social Democrats
Jablanica	Emir Muratović	Party of Democratic Action
Jajce	Edin Hozan	Party of Democratic Action
Jezero	Snežana Ružičić	Alliance of Independent Social Democrats
Kakanj	Mirnes Bajtarević	Party of Democratic Action
Kalesija	Nermin Mujkanović	Party of Democratic Action
Kalinovik	Radomir Sladoje	Alliance of Independent Social Democrats
Kiseljak	Mladen Mišurić-Ramljak	Croatian Democratic Union
Kladanj	Edis Šarić	Party of Democratic Action
Ključ	Jasmin Musić	Party of Democratic Action
Kneževo	Goran Borojević	Alliance of Independent Social Democrats
Kostajnica	Nikola Janjetović	Alliance of Independent Social Democrats
Kotor-Varoš	Zdenko Sakan	Party of Democratic Progress
Kozarska Dubica	Igor Savković	Alliance of Independent Social Democrats
Kreševo	Boris Marić	Croatian Democratic Union
Krupa na Uni	Gojko Kličković	People's Party of Srpska
Kupres (FBiH)	Danko Jurič	Croatian Democratic Union
Kupres (RS)	Srđen Petković	Socialist Party
Lopare	Rado Savić	Serb Democratic Party
Ljubinje	Stevo Drapić	Serb Democratic Party
Maglaj	Maid Suljaković	Party of Democratic Action
Milići	Marko Savić	Alliance of Independent Social Democrats
Modriča	Jovica Radulović	Serb Democratic Party
Mrkonjić Grad	Dragan Vođević	Alliance of Independent Social Democrats
Neum	Dragan Jurković	Croatian Democratic Union
Nevesinje	Milenko Avdalović	Alliance of Independent Social Democrats
Novi Grad, Republika Srpska	Miroslav Drljača	Alliance of Independent Social Democrats
Novi Grad, Sarajevo	Semir Efendić	Party for Bosnia and Herzegovina
Novo Goražde	Mila Petković	Alliance of Independent Social Democrats
Novo Sarajevo	Benjamina Karić	Social Democratic Party
Odžak	Anes Osmanović	Party of Democratic Action
Olovo	Đemal Memagić	Party of Democratic Action
Osmaci	Radan Sarić	Alliance of Independent Social Democrats
Oštra Luka	Duško Došenović	Alliance of Independent Social Democrats
Pale-Prača	Almin Ćutuk	Party of Democratic Action
Pale	Dejan Kojić	Democratic Union
Pelagićevo	Slavko Tešić	Alliance of Independent Social Democrats
Petrovac	Drago Kovačević	Alliance of Independent Social Democrats
Petrovo	Ozren Petković	Alliance of Independent Social Democrats
Posušje	Ante Begić	Croatian Democratic Union
Prozor-Rama	Jozo Ivančević	Rama People's Party
Ravno	Andrija Šimunović	Croatian Democratic Union
Ribnik	Duško Dakić	Alliance of Independent Social Democrats
Rogatica	Ninoslav Prelić	Alliance of Independent Social Democrats
Rudo	Dragoljub Bogdanović	Alliance of Independent Social Democrats
Sanski Most	Mensur Seferović	Party of Democratic Action
Sapna	Zudin Mahmutović	Party of Democratic Action
Sokolac	Strahinja Bašević	Alliance of Independent Social Democrats
Srbac	Mlađan Dragosavljević	Alliance of Independent Social Democrats
Srebrenica	Miloš Vučić	Alliance of Independent Social Democrats
Stanari	Aleksandar Ristić	United Srpska
Stari Grad, Sarajevo	Irfan Čengić	Social Democratic Party
Šamac	Đorđe Milićević	Serb Democratic Party
Šekovići	Miladin Lazić	Alliance of Independent Social Democrats
Šipovo	Milan Kovač	Alliance of Independent Social Democrats
Teočak	Tajib Muminović	Party of Democratic Action
Teslić	Milan Miličević	Serb Democratic Party
Tešanj	Suad Huskić	Party of Democratic Action
Tomislavgrad	Ivan Buntić	Croatian National Shift
Travnik	Kenan Dautović	Party of Democratic Action
Trnovo (FBiH)	Ibro Berilo	Party of Democratic Action
Trnovo (RS)	Miroslav Bjelica	Alliance of Independent Social Democrats
Ugljevik	Dragan Gajić	Alliance of Independent Social Democrats
Usora	Zvonimir Anđelić	Croatian Democratic Union
Vareš	Malik Rizvanović	Party of Democratic Action
Velika Kladuša	Boris Horvat	Independent
Višegrad	Mladen Đurđević	Alliance of Independent Social Democrats
Vitez	Boris Marjanović	Croatian Democratic Union
Vlasenica	Miroslav Kraljević	Alliance of Independent Social Democrats
Vogošća	Migdad Hasanović	Party of Democratic Action
Vukosavlje	Zekerijah Bahić	Social Democratic Party
Žepče	Mato Zovko	Croatian Democratic Union
