= Politics of Bosnia and Herzegovina =

The politics of Bosnia and Herzegovina are defined by a parliamentary, representative democratic framework, where the Chairman of the Council of Ministers of Bosnia and Herzegovina, named by the Presidency of Bosnia and Herzegovina, is the head of government. Executive power is exercised by the Council of Ministers of Bosnia and Herzegovina and the Presidency of Bosnia and Herzegovina. Legislative power is vested in both the Council of Ministers and the Parliamentary Assembly of Bosnia and Herzegovina. Members of the Parliamentary Assembly are chosen according to a proportional representation system. The judiciary is independent of the executive and the legislature.

The system of government established by the Dayton Agreement that ended the Bosnian war in 1995 is an example of consociationalism, as representation is by elites who represent the country's three major ethnic groups termed constituent peoples, with each having a guaranteed share of power.

Bosnia and Herzegovina is divided into two Entities – the Federation of Bosnia and Herzegovina and the Republika Srpska, which are politically autonomous to an extent, as well as the Brčko District, which is jointly administered by both. The Entities have their own constitutions. The Economist Intelligence Unit rated Bosnia and Herzegovina a "hybrid regime" in 2022.

== Dayton Agreement ==
After the signing of the Dayton Agreement on 14 December 1995, Bosnia and Herzegovina formed an undeclared protectorate, where highest power was given to the High Representative for Bosnia and Herzegovina, named by the Peace Implementation Council. The intention of the Agreement was to retain Bosnia's exterior border, while creating a joint multi-ethnic and democratic government based on proportional representation, and charged with conducting foreign, economic, and fiscal policy.

The Dayton Agreement established the Office of the High Representative (OHR) to oversee the implementation of the civilian aspects of the agreement.

== High Representative ==
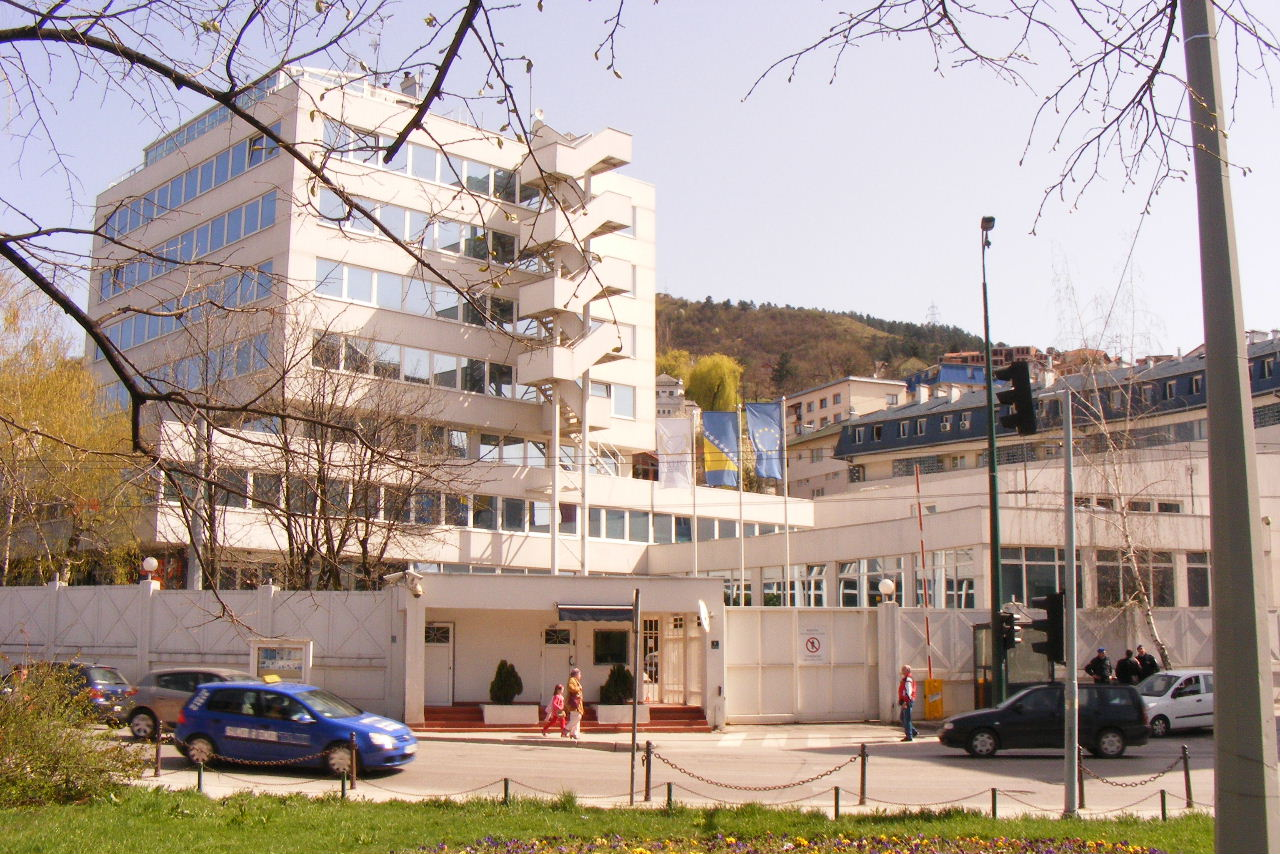
Office of the High Representative in Sarajevo

The highest political authority in the country is the High Representative for Bosnia and Herzegovina, the chief executive officer for the international civilian presence in the country. The High Representative has power to remove government officials, including court justices, local government members and members of parliament through the Bonn Powers which were introduced in 1997.

The mandate of the High Representatives derives from the Dayton Agreement, as confirmed by the Peace Implementation Council (PIC), a body with a Steering Board composed of representatives of Canada, France, Germany, Italy, Japan, Russia, the United Kingdom, the United States, the presidency of the European Union, the European Commission, and the Organisation of Islamic Cooperation. The Peace Implementation Council has established several criteria for the OHR to be closed, two of which have been completed but must be sustained until all five are completed.

Due to the vast powers of the High Representative over Bosnian politics and essential veto powers, the position has also been compared to that of a viceroy.

== Executive branch ==
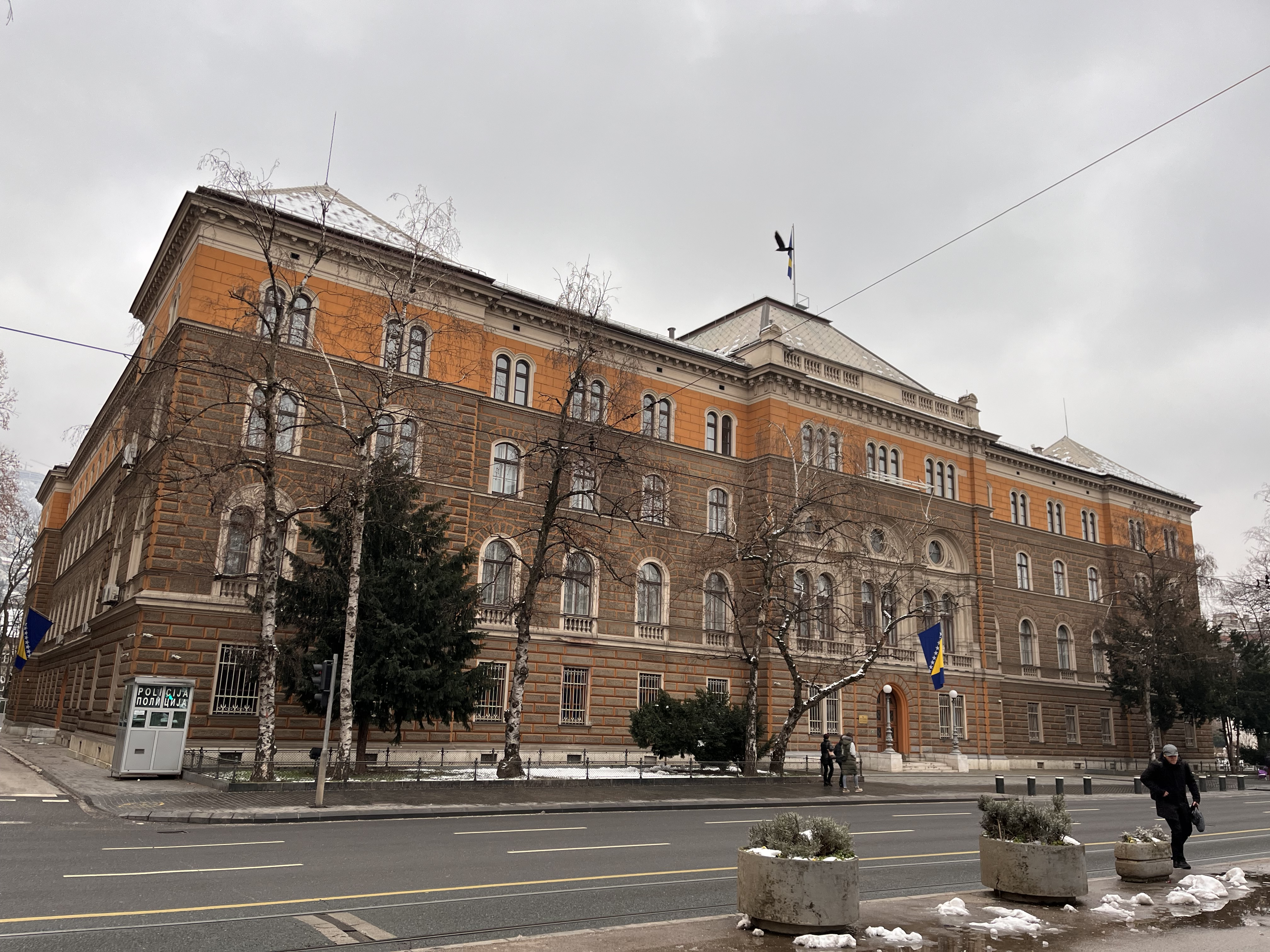
The Presidency Building in central Sarajevo

The Chair of the Presidency of Bosnia and Herzegovina rotates amongst three members (a Bosniak, a Serb, and a Croat) every 8 months within their 4-year term. The three members of the Presidency are elected directly by the people, with Federation voters electing both the Bosniak and the Croat member, and Republika Srpska voters electing the Serb member. The Presidency serves as a collective head of state. The Presidency is mainly responsible for the foreign policy and proposing the budget.

The Prime Minister, formally titled Chairman of the Council of Ministers of Bosnia and Herzegovina, is nominated by the Presidency and approved by the House of Representatives. They appoint the Minister of Foreign Affairs, the Minister of Foreign Trade and other ministers as may be appropriate (no more than two thirds of the ministers may be appointed from the territory of the Federation of Bosnia and Herzegovina), who assume the office upon the approval by the House of Representatives; also, the chair appoints deputy ministers (who may not be from the same constituent people as their ministers), who assume the office upon the approval by the House of Representatives.

The Council is responsible for carrying out policies and decisions in the fields of diplomacy, economy, inter-entity relations and other matters as agreed by the entities.

The two Entities have Governments that deal with internal matters not dealt with by the Council of Ministers.

== Legislative branch ==
The Parliamentary Assembly or Parliamentarna skupština is the main legislative body in Bosnia and Herzegovina. It consists of two chambers:

- the House of Peoples or Dom naroda
- the House of Representatives or Predstavnički dom/Zastupnički dom

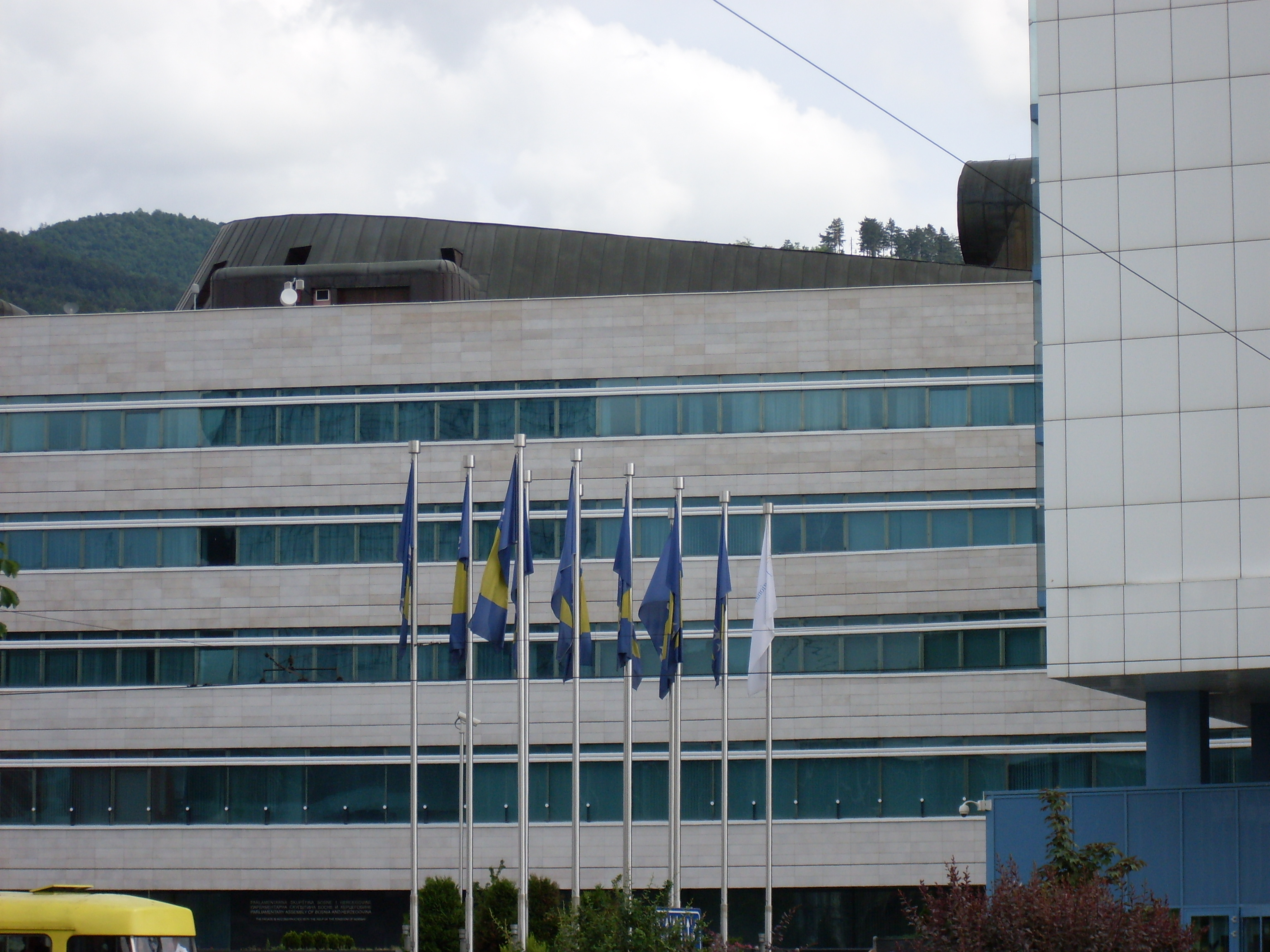
Parliamentary Assembly of Bosnia and Herzegovina

The Parliamentary Assembly is responsible for:

- enacting legislation as necessary to implement decisions of the Presidency or to carry out the responsibilities of the Assembly under the Constitution.
- deciding upon the sources and amounts of revenues for the operations of the institutions of Bosnia and Herzegovina and international obligations of Bosnia and Herzegovina.
- approving the budget for the institutions of Bosnia and Herzegovina.
- deciding ratify treaties and agreements.
- other matters as are necessary to carry out its duties of as are assigned to it by mutual agreement of the Entities.

Bosnia and Herzegovina did not have a permanent election law until 2001, during which time a draft law specified four-year terms for the state and first-order administrative division entity legislatures. The final election law was passed and publicized in 2001 and amended in 2002.

=== House of Peoples ===
The House of Peoples includes 15 delegates who serve two-year terms. Two-thirds of delegates come from the Federation (5 Croats and 5 Bosniaks) and one-third from the Republika Srpska (5 Serbs). Nine constitutes a quorum in the House of Peoples, provided that at least three delegates from each group are present. Federation representatives are selected by the House of Peoples of the Federation, which has 58 seats (17 Bosniaks, 17 Croats, 17 Serbs, 7 others), and whose members are delegated by cantonal assemblies to serve four-year terms. Republika Srpska representatives are selected by the 28-member Republika Srpska Council of Peoples, which was established in the National Assembly of Republika Srpska; each constituent people has eight delegates, while four delegates are representatives of "others".

=== House of Representatives ===
The House of Representatives comprises 42 members elected under a system of proportional representation (PR) for a four-year term. Two thirds of the members are elected from the Federation (14 Croats; 14 Bosniaks) and one third from the Republika Srpska (14 Serbs).

For the 2010 general election, voters in the Federation of Bosnia and Herzegovina elected twenty-one members in five multi-member constituencies by PR, while the remaining seven seats were allocated by compensatory PR. Voters in the Republika Srpska elected nine members in three multi-member constituencies by PR, while the five other seats were allocated by compensatory PR.

== Political parties and elections ==
Candidate	Party	Votes	%
Bosniak member
Denis Bećirović	Social Democratic Party of Bosnia and Herzegovina	222,484	38.10
Bakir Izetbegović	Party of Democratic Action	199,337	34.14
Semir Efendić	Party for Bosnia and Herzegovina	149,541	25.61
Fahrudin Radončić	Union for a Better Future of BiH	12,526	2.15
Croat member
Darijana Filipović	Croatian Democratic Union of Bosnia and Herzegovina	120,701	47.28
Slaven Kovačević	Democratic Front	76,655	30.03
Zdenko Lučić	Independent	57,924	22.69
Serb member
Željka Cvijanović	Alliance of Independent Social Democrats	319,705	55.57
Marinko Božović	Serb Democratic Party	151,746	26.38
Nebojša Vukanović	For Justice and Order	103,871	18.05
Invalid/blank votes		64,403	–
Total		1,478,893	100
Registered voters/turnout			
Source: CEC

=== House of Representatives ===
Party	Federation			Republika Srpska			Total			
Party	Votes	%	Seats	Votes	%	Seats	Votes	%	Seats	+/–
Party of Democratic Action	252,081	25.48	8	29,673	4.45	1	281,754	17.01	9	–1
Alliance of Independent Social Democrats	4,663	0.47	0	260,930	39.10	6	265,593	16.03	6	0
SDS–NDP–NS–SRS	–	–	–	162,414	24.34	3	162,414	9.80	3	–2
Social Democratic Party	140,781	14.23	5	9.672	1.45	0	150,453	9.08	5	+2
HDZ BiH–HSS–HSP-HNS–HKDU–HSP-AS BiH–HDU BiH	145,487	14.71	5	4.385	0.66	0	149,872	9.05	5	+1
Democratic Front–Civic Alliance	96,180	9.72	3	–	–	–	96,180	5.81	3	–1
Social Democratic Party	92,906	9.45	3	15,736	2.43	–	108,642	6.66	3	–5
PDP–NDP	194	0.02	0	50,338	7.76	1	50,532	3.10	1	0
Croatian Democratic Union 1990	40,113	4.08	1	–	–	–	40,113	2.46	1	–
Bosnian-Herzegovinian Patriotic Party-Sefer Halilović	35,866	3.65	1	2,452	0.38	0	38,318	2.35	1	+1
Democratic People's Alliance	–	–	–	37,072	5.72	1	37,072	2.27	1	0
Party for Bosnia and Herzegovina	25,677	2.61	0	–	–	–	25,677	1.57	0	–2
Party of Democratic Activity	22,088	2.25	1	–	–	–	22,088	1.35	1	New
Socialist Party	–	–	–	18,732	2.89	0	18,732	1.15	0	0
SPP–SDU–DNZ	12,885	1.31	0	3,429	0.53	0	16,314	1.00	0	–1
People's Party for Work and Betterment	12,927	1.31	0	–	–	–	12,927	0.79	0	–1
Serbian Progressive Party	–	–	–	11,421	1.76	0	11,421	0.70	0	0
Our Party	10,913	1.11	0	–	–	–	10,913	0.67	0	0
Party of Justice and Trust	–	–	–	9,763	1.51	0	9,763	0.60	0	New
Bosnian Party	7,518	0.76	0	–	–	–	7,518	0.46	0	0
Social Democratic Union	5,881	0.6	0	853	0.13	0	6,734	0.41	0	0
Labour Party	5,731	0.58	0	–	–	–	5,731	0.35	0	New
HSP–DSI	5,475	0.56	0	–	–	–	5,475	0.34	0	–
Communist Party	3,075	0.31	0	1,976	0.30	0	5,051	0.31	0	New
HKDU	4,718	0.48	0	–	–	–	4,718	0.29	0	New
Diaspora Party	3,371	0.34	0	–	–	–	3,371	0.21	0	New
New Movement	1,830	0.19	0	–	–	–	1,830	0.11	0	New
Tomo Vukić	–	–	–	397	0.06	0	397	0.02	0	New
Invalid/blank votes	97,720	–	–	58,857	–	–	156,577	–	–	–
Total	1,081,025	100	28	701,156	100	14	1,782,181	100	42	–
Registered voters/turnout			–			–			–	–
Source: CEC

=== Election history ===
National House of Representatives:

- elections held 12–13 September 1998:
  - seats by party/coalition – KCD 17, HDZ-BiH 6, SDP-BiH 6, Sloga 4, SDS 4, SRS-RS 2, DNZ 1, NHI 1, RSRS 1
- elections held 5 October 2002:
  - percent of vote by party/coalition - SDA 21.9%, SDS 14.0%, SBiH 10.5%, SDP 10.4%, SNSD 9.8%, HDZ 9.5%, PDP 4.6%, others 19.3%
  - seats by party/coalition – SDA 10, SDS 5, SBiH 6, SDP 4, SNSD 3, HDZ 5, PDP 2, others 7

House of Peoples:

- constituted 4 December 1998
- constituted in fall 2000
- constituted in January 2003
- next to be constituted in 2007

Federal House of Representatives:

- elections held fall 1998:
  - seats by party/coalition – KCD 68, HDZ-BiH 28, SDP-BiH 25, NHI 4, DNZ 3, DSP 2, BPS 2, HSP 2, SPRS 2, BSP 1, KC 1, BOSS 1, HSS 1
- elections held 5 October 2002:
  - seats by party/coalition – SDA 32, HDZ-BiH 16, SDP 15, SBiH 15, other 20

Federal House of Peoples:

- constituted November 1998
- constituted December 2002

Republika Srpska National Assembly:

- elections held fall 1998
  - seats by party/coalition – SDS 19, KCD 15, SNS 12, SRS-RS 11, SPRS 10, SNSD 6, RSRS 3, SKRS 2, SDP 2, KKO 1, HDZ-BiH 1, NHI 1
- elections held fall 2000
- elections held 5 October 2002
  - seats by party/coalition – SDS 26, SNSD 19, PDP 9, SDA 6, SRS 4, SPRS 3, DNZ 3, SBiH 4, SDP 3, others 6

== Judicial branch ==
=== Constitutional Court ===
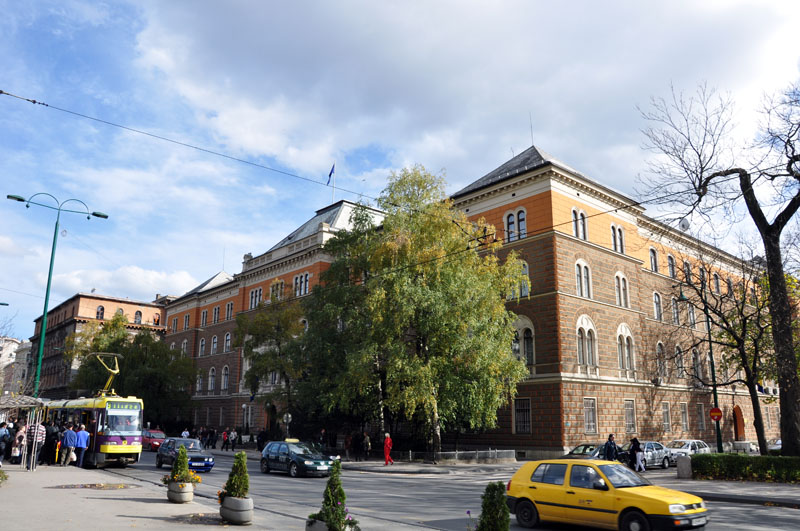
The Presidency Building, seat of the Constitutional Court of Bosnia and Herzegovina

The Constitutional Court of Bosnia and Herzegovina is the supreme, final arbiter of constitutional matters. The court is composed of nine members: four selected by the House of Representatives of the Federation, two by the National Assembly of Republika Srpska, and three are foreign citizens appointed by the President of the European Court of Human Rights after courtesy-consultation with the Presidency.

The initial term of appointee is 5 years, unless they resign or are removed by consensus of other judges. Appointed judges are not eligible for reappointment. Judges subsequently appointed will serve until the age of 70, unless they resign sooner or are removed. Appointments made 5 years into the initial appointments may be governed by a different regulation for selection, to be determined by the Parliamentary Assembly.

Proceedings of the Court are public, and decisions are published. Court rules are adopted by a majority in the Court. Court decisions are final and supposedly binding though this is not always the case, as noted.

The Constitutional Court has jurisdiction over deciding in constitutional disputes that arise between the Entities or amongst Bosnia and Herzegovina and an Entity or Entities. Such disputes may be referred only by a member of the Presidency, the Chair of the Council of Ministers, the chair or deputy chair of either of the chambers of the Parliamentary Assembly, or by one-fourth of the legislature of either Entity.

The Court also has appellate jurisdiction within the territory of Bosnia and Herzegovina.

=== State Court ===
The Court of Bosnia and Herzegovina consists of three divisions – Administrative, Appellate and Criminal – having jurisdiction over cases related to the state-level law and executive, as well as appellate jurisdiction over cases initiated in the entities.

A War Crimes Chamber was introduced in January 2005, and has adopted two cases transferred from the ICTY, as well as dozens of war crimes cases originally initiated in cantonal courts.

The State Court also deals with organized crime, and economic crime including corruption cases. For example, the former member of the Presidency Dragan Čović was on trial for alleged involvement in organized crime.

=== Human Rights Chamber ===
The Human Rights Chamber for Bosnia and Herzegovina (Dom za ljudska prava za Bosnu i Hercegovinu) existed between March 1996 and 31 December 2003. It was a judicial body established under the Annex 6 of the General Framework Agreement for Peace in Bosnia and Herzegovina (Dayton Agreement).

=== Entities ===
The two Entities have Supreme Courts. Each entity also has a number of lower courts. There are 10 cantonal courts in the Federation, along with a number of municipal courts. The Republika Srpska has seven district (okrug) courts.

=== High Judicial and Prosecutorial Council ===
The High Judicial and Prosecutorial Council (JHPC / VSTV) is the self-regulatory body of the judiciary in the country, tasked with guaranteeing its independence. It is based on the continental tradition of self-management of the judiciary. It was formed in 2004.

== See also ==
- Constitution of Bosnia and Herzegovina
