= ZNG =

ZNG may refer to:

- Croatian National Guard (Croatian: Zbor narodne garde), a 1991 Croatian War of Independence armed force
- For New Generations (Bosnian: Za Nove Generacije), a political party in Bosnia and Herzegovina founded in 2022
- zng, the ISO 639-3 code for Mang language
- ZNG-FM, a radio station in Nassau, Bahamas
