= Workers' Communist Party of Bosnia and Herzegovina =

Workers' Communist Party of Bosnia and Herzegovina Radničko-komunistička partija Bosne i Hercegovine
- Abbreviation: RKP-BiH
- Leader: Goran Marković
- Founder: Goran Marković
- Founded: 2000
- Headquarters: Bijeljina, Republika Srpska
- Ideology: Communism; Luxemburgism; Workers' self-management Anti-nationalism; Yugoslavism; Democratic socialism
- Political position: Left-wing to far-left
- International affiliation: IMCWP (2000-2006)
- Colours: Red
- Ethnic group: Multi-ethnic
- HoR BiH: 0 / 42
- HoP BiH: 0 / 15
- HoR FBiH: 0 / 98
- HoP FBiH: 0 / 80
- NA RS: 0 / 83

The Workers' Communist Party of Bosnia and Herzegovina (Serbo-Croatian Latin: Radničko-komunistička partija Bosne i Hercegovine Serbo-Croatian Cyrillic: Радничко-комунистичка партија Босне и Херцеговине) is a Luxemburgist party from Bosnia and Herzegovina. It was formed in 2000 and strongly opposes the nationalism present in the region and the collapse of the Socialist Federal Republic of Yugoslavia.

Some of their major aims are the introduction of workers' self-management and participatory democracy, as well as the re-establishment of a socialist federal Yugoslavia. They say they are not motivated by nostalgia, as they are critical of Josip Broz Tito.

They believe that socialism has to be democratic and strongly oppose the system of the former Soviet Union and other former governments. They have been particularly influenced by Rosa Luxemburg and Antonio Gramsci.

== See also ==
- Communist Party (Bosnia and Herzegovina)
