= Parliament of the Federation of Bosnia and Herzegovina =

Legislature of the federal entity within Boznia and Herzegovina

Parliament of the Federation of Bosnia and Herzegovina Parlament Federacije Bosne i Hercegovine Парламент Федерације Босне и Херцеговине

Type
- Type: Bicameral
- Houses: House of Peoples; House of Representatives

History
- Founded: 30 March 1994

Leadership
- Chairman of the House of Peoples: Tomislav Martinović (HDZ BiH) since 20 February 2019
- Chairman of the House of Representatives: Vacant

Structure
- House of Peoples political groups: Bosniak caucus (23): SDA (12); NiP (4); NES (2); SDP BiH (1); DF (1); NS (1); SBiH (1); BHI (1); Croat caucus (23): HDZ BiH (13); HDZ 1990 (3); SDP BiH (1); NiP (1); NES (1); HNP (1); ZNG (1); BNS (1); HDS (1); Serb caucus (23): SDP BiH (7); SDA (3); HDZ BiH (3); DF (2); SNSD (2); NS (1); LS BiH (1); NP (1); SNS (1); SNP (1); Independent (1); Minority caucus (11): DF (4); SDP BiH (3); NS (2); SBiH (1); NES (1)
- House of Representatives political groups: Government (44) HDZ BiH (15) SDP BiH (14) NiP (7) NS (5) HDZ 1990 (3) SN (1) Supported by (8) NES (3) PDA (1) HNP (1) POMAK (1) Independent (2) Opposition (46) SDA (26) DF–GS (14) SBiH (4) HRS (1) Independent (1)

Elections
- Last House of Peoples election: 4 October 2026

Meeting place
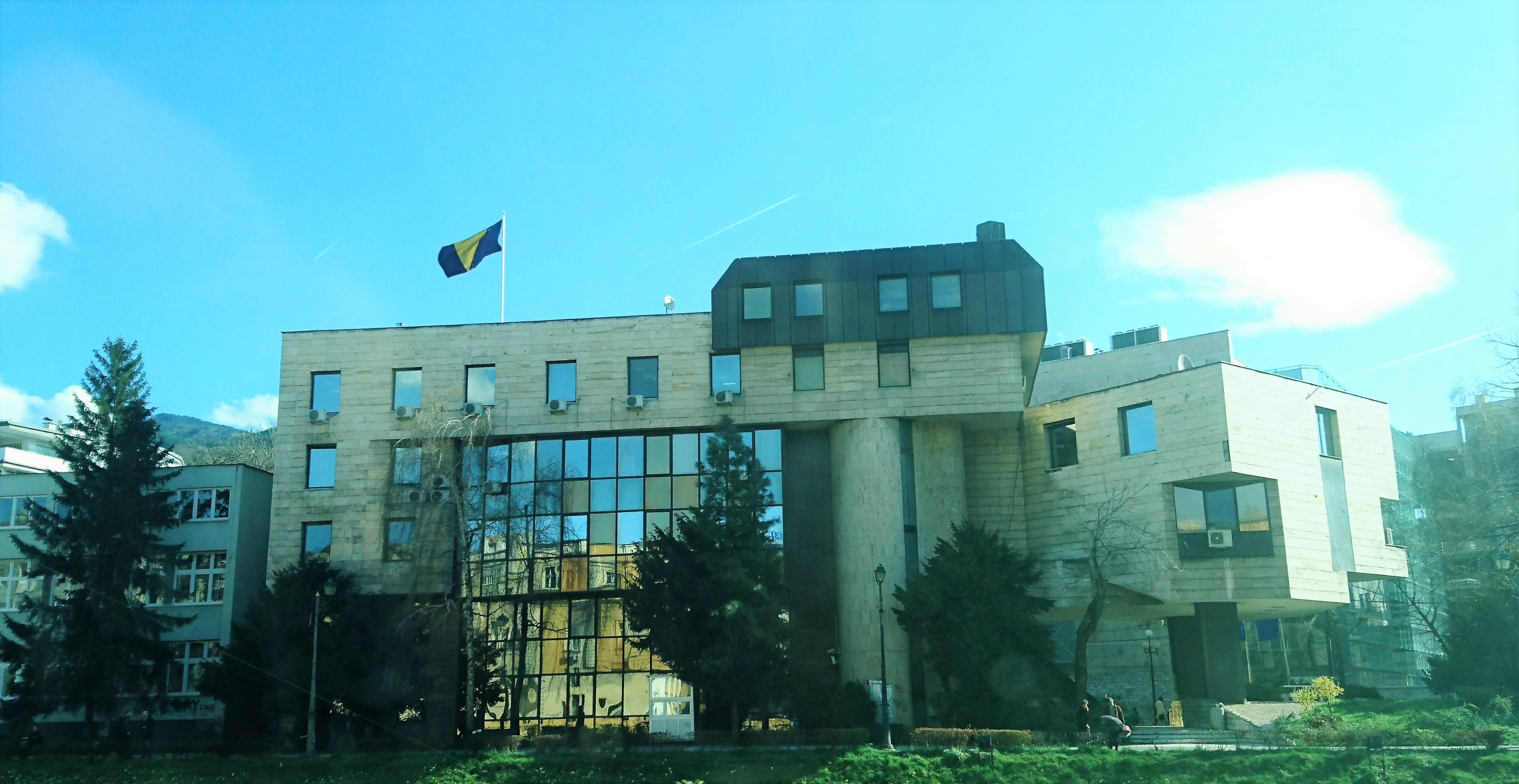
- Federal Parliament Building; Sarajevo, Bosnia and Herzegovina

Website
- parlamentfbih.gov.ba

The Parliament of the Federation of Bosnia and Herzegovina (Serbo-Croatian: Parlament Federacije Bosne i Hercegovine / Парламент Федерације Босне и Херцеговине), often called Federal Parliament (Serbo-Croatian: Federalni parlament / Федералн парламент), is the bicameral legislative body of the Federation of Bosnia and Herzegovina, one of two entities of Bosnia and Herzegovina. It consists of the following two chambers.

- The House of Representatives (Bosnian and Serbian: Predstavnički dom / Представнички дом, Croatian: Zastupnički dom) has 98 members, elected for a four-year terms by proportional representation.
- The House of Peoples (Dom naroda / Дом народа) has 80 members, composed out of 23 delegates from each of the constituent nations of the Federation of Bosnia and Herzegovina, as well as 11 delegates of the minorities, appointed by each Cantonal legislature.

== History ==
The Parliament of the Federation of Bosnia and Herzegovina was formed after the signing of the Washington Agreement in March 1994, during the Bosnian War. The Agreement was implemented during the spring of 1994, when the Constitutional Assembly of the Federation of Bosnia and Herzegovina was convoked. On 24 June, it adopted and proclaimed the Constitution of the Federation of Bosnia and Herzegovina.

== Powers ==
The powers of the Federal Parliament are described in the Constitution of the Federation of Bosnia and Herzegovina. The Federal Parliament has power to:

- elect the Federal President and Vice-Presidents;
- make a request to the Constitutional Court for the dismissal of the President and vice-presidents;
- ratify the Federal Government by a majority of votes;
- enacting laws to exercise responsibilities allocate to the Federal Government, which shall take effect as specified therein but no sooner than when promulgated in the Official Journal;
- authorizing any use of military force by the Federation of Bosnia and Herzegovina, which must be in accordance with international law;
- granting the cantons the authority to sign the agreements with states and international organizations, with the agreement of the Parliamentary Assembly, except of the agreements for which the Parliamentary Assembly decides by the law that they do not need such an agreement;
- adopting the Federal budget and enacting legislation to levy taxes and otherwise secure the necessary financing;
- performing such other responsibilities as are conferred upon it.

== See also ==
- Politics of Bosnia and Herzegovina
