= Union for a Better Future of Bosnia and Herzegovina =

Centre-right Bosniak political party

Union for a Better Future of Bosnia and Herzegovina Savez za bolju budućnost Bosne i Hercegovine
- Leader: Fahrudin Radončić
- Board: Amer Kapo
- Founded: 30 October 2009
- Headquarters: Tešanjska 24A, Sarajevo
- Youth wing: Youth Forum SBB BiH
- Ideology: Conservatism; Pro-Europeanism
- Political position: Centre-right
- HoR BiH: 0 / 42
- HoP BiH: 0 / 15
- HoR FBiH: 0 / 98
- HoP FBiH: 0 / 80
- NA RS: 0 / 83

Website
- www.sbb.ba

The Union for a Better Future of Bosnia and Herzegovina (Bosnian: Savez za bolju budućnost Bosne i Hercegovine or SBB BiH) is a Bosniak centre-right political party in Bosnia and Herzegovina. The party was founded in September 2009 by Fahrudin Radončić, the founder and owner of Dnevni avaz, the largest daily newspaper in Bosnia and Herzegovina.

== List of presidents ==
#	Name (Born–Died)	Portrait	Term of Office	
1	Fahrudin Radončić (b. 1957)		30 October 2009	present

== Election results ==
=== Parliamentary Assembly of Bosnia and Herzegovina ===
Parliamentary Assembly of Bosnia and Herzegovina
Year	Leader	#	Popular vote	%	HoR	Seat change	HoP	Seat change	Government
2010	Fahrudin Radončić	5th	130,448	7.95	4 / 42	New	0 / 15	New	Opposition (2010–2012)
2010	Fahrudin Radončić	5th	130,448	7.95	4 / 42	New	0 / 15	New	Coalition (2012–2014)
2014	Fahrudin Radončić	5th	142,003	8.71	4 / 42	0	1 / 15	▲1	Opposition (2014–2016)
2014	Fahrudin Radončić	5th	142,003	8.71	4 / 42	0	1 / 15	▲1	Coalition (2016–2018)
2018	Fahrudin Radončić	9th	68,993	4.16	2 / 42	▼2	1 / 15	0	Coalition (2018–2020)
2018	Fahrudin Radončić	9th	68,993	4.16	2 / 42	▼2	1 / 15	0	Opposition (2020–2022)
2022	Fahrudin Radončić	16th	24,786	1.56	0 / 42	▼2	0 / 15	▼1	Extra-parliamentary
2026	Fahrudin Radončić	19th	10,029	0.74	0 / 42	0	0 / 15	0	Extra-parliamentary

=== Parliament of the Federation of Bosnia and Herzegovina ===
Parliament of the Federation of Bosnia and Herzegovina
Year	Leader	#	Popular vote	%	HoR	Seat change	HoP	Seat change	Government
2010	Fahrudin Radončić	3rd	121,697	11.89	13 / 98	New	3 / 58	New	Opposition
2014	Fahrudin Radončić	2nd	145,946	14.71	16 / 98	▲3	4 / 58	▲1	Opposition (2014–2015)
2014	Fahrudin Radončić	2nd	145,946	14.71	16 / 98	▲3	4 / 58	▲1	Coalition (2015–2018)
2018	Fahrudin Radončić	5th	70,571	7.05	8 / 98	▼8	2 / 58	▼2	Coalition
2022	Fahrudin Radončić	9th	27,597	2.83	0 / 98	▼8	0 / 80	▼2	Extra-parliamentary
2026	Fahrudin Radončić	10th	10,016	1.31	0 / 98	0	0 / 80	0	Extra-parliamentary

=== Presidency elections ===
Presidency of Bosnia and Herzegovina
Election year	#	Candidate	Representing	Votes	%	Note	Elected?
2010	2nd	Fahrudin Radončić	Bosniaks	142,387	30.49%	—	No
2014	2nd	Fahrudin Radončić	Bosniaks	201,454	26.78%	—	No
2018	3rd	Fahrudin Radončić	Bosniaks	75,210	12.95%	—	No
2022	1st	Denis Bećirović (Note: Member of the SDP BiH.)	Bosniaks	330,238	57.37%	Support	Yes
2026	4th	Fahrudin Radončić	Bosniaks	12,526	2.15%	—	No

=== Cantonal elections ===
Cantonal election	Cantonal Assembly										
Cantonal election	Una-Sana	Posavina	Tuzla	Zenica-Doboj	Bosnian Podrinje Goražde	Central Bosnia	Herzegovina-Neretva	West Herzegovina	Sarajevo	Canton 10	Total won / Total contested
2010	2 / 30	1 / 21	4 / 35	5 / 35	3 / 25	4 / 30	3 / 30	0 / 23	7 / 35	0 / 25	29 / 289
2014	3 / 30	1 / 21	5 / 35	8 / 35	5 / 25	4 / 30	3 / 30	0 / 23	7 / 35	0 / 25	36 / 289
2018	2 / 30	1 / 21	2 / 35	3 / 35	2 / 25	2 / 30	2 / 30	0 / 23	4 / 35	0 / 25	18 / 289
2022	0 / 30	0 / 21	0 / 35	2 / 35	1 / 25	0 / 30	0 / 30	0 / 23	0 / 35	0 / 25	3 / 289
