= Forward (Bosnia and Herzegovina) =

Political party in Bosnia and Herzegovina

Forward Naprijed
- President: Šemsudin Mehmedović
- Founded: 3 January 2024; 2 years ago
- Split from: Party of Democratic Action
- Headquarters: Zmaja od Bosne 7, Sarajevo
- Ideology: Liberal conservatism; Political unitarism; Secularism; Pro-Europeanism; Atlanticism
- Political position: Centre
- HoR BiH: 0 / 42
- HoP BiH: 0 / 15
- HoR FBiH: 0 / 98
- HoP FBiH: 0 / 80
- NA RS: 0 / 83

Website
- naprijed.ba

Forward (Bosnian: Naprijed; abbr. NPD), officially Forward, Bosnia and Herzegovina! (Naprijed Bosna i Hercegovina!), is a centrist political party in Bosnia and Herzegovina. The party was founded on 3 January 2024.

== History ==
Forward was founded by Šemsudin Mehmedović on 3 January 2024, following his disillusionment with the Party of Democratic Action, particularly its leader Bakir Izetbegović. It describes itself as a centrist and liberal conservative political party, emphasising its support for Bosnia and Herzegovina's accession to the European Union and NATO.

== List of presidents ==
#	Name (Born–Died)	Portrait	Term of Office	
1	Šemsudin Mehmedović (b. 1961)		3 January 2024	present

== Election results ==
=== Parliamentary Assembly of Bosnia and Herzegovina ===
Parliamentary Assembly of Bosnia and Herzegovina
Year	Leader	#	Popular vote	%	HoR	Seat change	HoP	Seat change	Government
2026 (Note: Run as part of Together BiH (NES, NPD and PDA) which won a single seat that went to NES.)	Šemsudin Mehmedović	11th	33,324	2.46	0 / 42	New	0 / 15	New	Extra-parliamentary
