= People's Power (Bosnia and Herzegovina) =

Political party in Bosnia and Herzegovina

People's Power Snaga naroda
- President: Ramo Isak
- Founded: 14 July 2023
- Split from: People's European Union
- Headquarters: Muhameda Seida Serdarevića 1, Zenica
- Ideology: Populism; Anti-corruption; Pro-Europeanism
- Political position: Centre to centre-right
- HoR BiH: 0 / 42
- HoP BiH: 0 / 15
- HoR FBiH: 0 / 98
- HoP FBiH: 0 / 80
- NA RS: 0 / 83

Website
- snaganaroda.ba

People's Power (Bosnian: Snaga naroda; abbr. SN) is a centre to centre-right political party in Bosnia and Herzegovina. The party was founded on 14 July 2023.

== History ==
People's Power was founded by the Federal Minister of Interior Ramo Isak on 14 July 2023. It describes itself as a populist and anti-corruption political party.

== List of presidents ==
#	Name (Born–Died)	Portrait	Term of Office	
1	Ramo Isak (b. 1973)		14 July 2023	present

== Elections ==
=== Parliament of the Federation of Bosnia and Herzegovina ===
Parliament of the Federation of Bosnia and Herzegovina
Year	#	Popular vote	%	HoR	Seat change	HoP	Seat change	Government
2026	13th	7,859	0.98	0 / 98	New	TBD	TBD	TBD
