= People and Justice =

Political party in Bosnia and Herzegovina

People and Justice Narod i pravda
- Abbreviation: NiP
- President: Elmedin Konaković
- Deputy President: Denis Zvizdić
- Founded: 12 March 2018; 8 years ago
- Split from: Party of Democratic Action
- Headquarters: Zmaja od Bosne 13, Sarajevo
- Ideology: Liberal conservatism; Pro-Europeanism; Atlanticism
- Political position: Centre-right
- National affiliation: Troika (since 2020)
- Colours: Navy blue
- HoP BiH: 0 / 15
- HoR BiH: 2 / 42
- HoP FBiH: 5 / 80
- HoR FBiH: 7 / 98
- NA RS: 0 / 83
- Cantonal Heads: 1 / 10
- Mayors: 4 / 145

Website
- www.narodipravda.ba

People and Justice (Bosnian: Narod i pravda, abbreviated NiP) is a centre-right political party in Bosnia and Herzegovina. The party was founded on 12 March 2018.

== History ==
People and Justice (NiP) was founded on 12 March 2018, after Elmedin Konaković resigned from all party functions in the conservative Bosniak Party of Democratic Action. In the general election held in the same year, the party won six seats in the Sarajevo Canton Assembly, two seats in the Federal House of Representatives and one seat in the Federal House of Peoples.

In the 2020 municipal elections, NiP significantly increased its share of votes in the capital Sarajevo, becoming the largest political party in the city. In the 2022 general election, the party also significantly increased its share of votes in the country, winning three seats in the national House of Representatives and seven seats in the Federal one. Following the election, a coalition led by the Alliance of Independent Social Democrats, the Croatian Democratic Union and the Social Democratic Party, including NiP, reached an agreement on the formation of a new government.

The 2024 municipal elections in October saw mixed results. Despite winning in Ilijaš and holding on to Ilidža and Srebrenik, NiP suffered noticeable losses in Sarajevo, losing municipal councilors in all four of the city's municipalities. Following lengthy coalition negotiations, party member Samir Avdić was elected mayor of Sarajevo by the Sarajevo City Council on 16 July 2025.

== List of presidents ==
#	Name (Born–Died)	Portrait	Term of Office	
1	Elmedin Konaković (b. 1974)		12 March 2018	present

== Election results ==
=== Parliamentary Assembly of Bosnia and Herzegovina ===
Parliamentary Assembly of Bosnia and Herzegovina
Year	Leader	#	Popular vote	%	HoR	Seat change	HoP	Seat change	Government
2018	Elmedin Konaković	16th	23,381	1.41	0 / 42	New	0 / 15	New	Extra-parliamentary
2022	Elmedin Konaković	7th	79,555	5.01	3 / 42	▲3	1 / 15	▲1	Coalition
2026 (Note: Run in coalition with SD BiH, winning both seats obtained by the coalition.)	Elmedin Konaković	8th	58,837	4.35	2 / 42	▼1	TBD	TBD	TBD

=== Parliament of the Federation of Bosnia and Herzegovina ===
Parliament of the Federation of Bosnia and Herzegovina
Year	Leader	#	Popular vote	%	HoR	Seat change	HoP	Seat change	Government
2018	Elmedin Konaković	11th	23,222	2.32	2 / 98	New	1 / 58	New	Opposition
2022 (Note: Run in coalition with SPU.)	Elmedin Konaković	5th	67,200	6.89	7 / 98	▲5	6 / 80	▲5	Coalition
2026 (Note: Run in coalition with SD BiH and SPU.)	Elmedin Konaković	5th	49,160	6.51	7 / 98	0	TBD	TBD	TBD

=== Presidency elections ===
Presidency of Bosnia and Herzegovina
Election year	#	Candidate	Votes	%	Representing	Note	Elected?
2022	1st	Denis Bećirović (Note: Member of the SDP BiH.)	330,238	57.37%	Bosniaks	Support	Yes
2022	3rd	Vojin Mijatović	38,655	6.09%	Serbs	Support	No
2026	1st	Denis Bećirović	212,653	38.17%	Bosniaks	Support	Yes

=== Cantonal elections ===
Cantonal election	Cantonal Assembly										
Cantonal election	Una-Sana	Posavina	Tuzla	Zenica-Doboj	Bosnian Podrinje Goražde	Central Bosnia	Herzegovina-Neretva	West Herzegovina	Sarajevo	Canton 10	Total won / Total contested
2018	0 / 30	0 / 21	0 / 35	0 / 35	0 / 25	0 / 30	0 / 30	0 / 23	6 / 35	0 / 25	6 / 289
2022	2 / 30	0 / 21	2 / 35	3 / 35	3 / 25	2 / 30	1 / 30	0 / 23	7 / 35	0 / 25	20 / 289
