= Greens of Bosnia and Herzegovina =

Bosnian political party

Greens of Bosnia and Herzegovina Zeleni Bosne i Hercegovine
- Leader: Hasan Delić
- Founded: 2004
- Dissolved: 2013; 13 years ago
- Headquarters: Sarajevo
- Ideology: Green politics
- Colours: Green, white and pink
- Slogan: "Let's clean up the country"

The Greens of Bosnia and Herzegovina (Bosnian: Zeleni Bosne i Hercegovine, Zeleni BiH) was a Bosnian green political party.

== History ==
The party was founded in 2004. The Greens also seek to strengthen their relations with other Green Parties, such as the European Green Party and NGOs in Bosnia-Herzegovina, like the peace-movement, the women's movement, the youth and student's movement, environmental organizations and labour unions.

== Ideology and policies ==
The party advocates on the following policies:

- building a democratic, independent and sovereign Bosnia and Herzegovina
- protection of human rights and political freedoms
- strengthening local and regional government
- Bosnia and Herzegovina's entry into the European Union
- a more transparent, free market economy
- protection of the environment
- Abolition of corporate monopolies and oligarchies
- establishment of ecological standards for production
- Stronger regulation of the healthcare industry

== See also ==
- Green party
- Green politics
- List of environmental organizations
