= For New Generations =

Political party in Bosnia and Herzegovina

For New Generations Za Nove Generacije
- President: Damir Marjanović
- Founded: 29 April 2022
- Split from: Our Party
- Headquarters: Vilsonovo 10, Sarajevo
- Ideology: Social liberalism; Green liberalism; Pro-Europeanism; Secularism
- Political position: Centre to centre-left
- HoR BiH: 0 / 42
- HoP BiH: 0 / 15
- HoR FBiH: 0 / 98
- HoP FBiH: 0 / 80
- NA RS: 0 / 83

Website
- zanovegeneracije.ba

For New Generations (Bosnian: Za Nove Generacije; abbr. ZNG) is a social liberal and green liberal political party in Bosnia and Herzegovina. It was founded on 29 April 2022.

== History ==
For New Generations was founded by Federal House of Peoples member Damir Marjanović on 29 April 2022.

At the 2022 general election, the party contested all levels of government except for the Presidency. Running in a coalition with the People's European Union, both parties gained one seat in the national House of Representatives.

== List of presidents ==
#	Name (Born–Died)	Portrait	Term of Office	
1	Damir Marjanović (b. 1974)		29 April 2022	present

== Elections ==
=== Parliamentary Assembly of Bosnia and Herzegovina ===
Parliamentary Assembly of Bosnia and Herzegovina
Year	#	Popular vote	%	HoR	Seat change	HoP	Seat change	Government
2022 (Note: Run in coalition with NES.)	10th	47,157	2.97	0 / 42	New	1 / 15	New	Opposition

=== Parliament of the Federation of Bosnia and Herzegovina ===
Parliament of the Federation of Bosnia and Herzegovina
Year	#	Popular vote	%	HoR	Seat change	HoP	Seat change	Government
2022	18th	5,334	0.55	0 / 98	New	1 / 80	New	Opposition

=== Cantonal elections ===
Cantonal election	Cantonal Assembly										
Cantonal election	Una-Sana	Posavina	Tuzla	Zenica-Doboj	Bosnian Podrinje Goražde	Central Bosnia	Herzegovina-Neretva	West Herzegovina	Sarajevo	Canton 10	Total won / Total contested
2022	0 / 30	0 / 21	0 / 35	0 / 35	0 / 25	0 / 30	0 / 30	0 / 23	1 / 35	0 / 25	1 / 289
