= ZNG-FM =

Radio station

ZNW-FM
- Nassau, Bahamas; Bahamas
- Broadcast area: New Providence, Bahamas
- Frequency: 93.9 MHz
- Branding: Glory 93.9

Programming
- Format: religious

History
- Call sign meaning: ZN (former ITU prefix under United Kingdom rule) Glory

Technical information
- ERP: 1,000 watts
- Transmitter coordinates: 25°02′44″N 77°19′05″W

ZNG-FM is a radio station in Nassau, Bahamas broadcasting a religious format to the southern Bahamas. It is unknown when ZNG-FM began broadcasting, or if the station is still operational.
