= Party for Bosnia and Herzegovina =

Political party in Bosnia and Herzegovina

Party for Bosnia and Herzegovina Stranka za Bosnu i Hercegovinu
- Leader: Semir Efendić
- Founder: Haris Silajdžić
- Founded: 13 April 1996; 30 years ago
- Split from: Party of Democratic Action
- Headquarters: Reisa Džemaludina Čauševića 2/1, Sarajevo
- Ideology: Social conservatism; Political unitarism; Pro-Europeanism; Atlanticism
- Political position: Centre to centre-right
- Colours: Yellow
- HoP BiH: 1 / 15
- HoR BiH: 3 / 42
- HoP FBiH: 2 / 80
- HoR FBiH: 9 / 98
- NA RS: 0 / 83
- Cantonal Heads: 0 / 10
- Mayors: 1 / 145

Website
- www.zabih.ba

The Party for Bosnia and Herzegovina (Bosnian: Stranka za Bosnu i Hercegovinu, abbreviated SBiH) is a centre to centre-right political party in Bosnia and Herzegovina. The party is one the most prominent unitarianist parties in the country as it staunchly opposes federalism and devolution of political power along ethnic lines by the means of entities – i.e. Federation of Bosnia and Herzegovina and Republika Srpska.

The party was founded on 13 April 1996 by former prime minister Haris Silajdžić. The SBiH was established following a split with the Party of Democratic Action (SDA). Although defined as "multi-ethnic," it is a party with a predominantly Bosniak electorate. From 2000 to 2002, it ruled as part of the "Alliance for Change" alongside the Social Democratic Party. In the 2006 general election, its leader Haris Silajdžić was elected member of the Presidency of Bosnia and Herzegovina, but failed to get re-elected in the 2010 election.

In April 2021, Semir Efendić‍—‌municipal mayor of Novi Grad Sarajevo and former SDA member‍—‌became party president following the resignation of his predecessor Amer Jerlagić.

== List of presidents ==
#	Name (Born–Died)	Portrait	Term of Office		Days
1	Haris Silajdžić (b. 1945)		13 April 1996	6 March 2012	15 years, 328 days
2	Amer Jerlagić (b. 1967)		6 March 2012	23 April 2021	9 years, 48 days
3	Semir Efendić (b. 1983)		23 April 2021	present	5 years, 189 days

== Election results ==
=== Parliamentary Assembly of Bosnia and Herzegovina ===
Parliamentary Assembly of Bosnia and Herzegovina
Year	Leader	#	Popular vote	%	HoR	Seat change	HoP	Seat change	Government
1996	Haris Silajdžić	5th	93,816	3.91	2 / 42	New	0 / 15	New	Coalition
1998 (Note: Run as part of the Coalition for Unity and Democracy (SDA, SBiH, LS and GDS).)	Haris Silajdžić	1st	583,945	33.83	3 / 42	▲1	1 / 15	▲1	Coalition
2000	Haris Silajdžić	5th	168,995	11.34	5 / 42	▲2	1 / 15	0	Coalition
2002	Haris Silajdžić	3rd	136,090	11.07	6 / 42	▲1	1 / 15	0	Coalition
2006	Haris Silajdžić	3rd	219,487	15.54	8 / 42	▲2	1 / 15	0	Coalition
2010	Haris Silajdžić	7th	86,669	5.28	2 / 42	▼6	0 / 15	▼1	Opposition
2014	Amer Jerlagić	12th	25,677	1.57	0 / 42	▼2	0 / 15	0	Extra-parliamentary
2018	Amer Jerlagić	17th	17,830	1.08	0 / 42	0	0 / 15	0	Extra-parliamentary
2022	Semir Efendić	13th	26,480	1.67	0 / 42	0	1 / 15	▲1	Opposition
2026	Semir Efendić	6th	74,573	5.51	3 / 42	▲3	TBD	TBD	TBD

=== Parliament of the Federation of Bosnia and Herzegovina ===
Parliament of the Federation of Bosnia and Herzegovina
Year	Leader	#	Popular vote	%	HoR	Seat change	HoP	Seat change	Government
1996	Haris Silajdžić	4th	98,207	7.35	10 / 140	New	4 / 65	New	Coalition
1998	Haris Silajdžić	1st	456,458	49.20	68 / 140	▲58	26 / 72	▲22	Coalition
2000	Haris Silajdžić	4th	128,833	14.85	21 / 140	▼47	10 / 81	▼16	Coalition
2002	Haris Silajdžić	4th	109,843	15.70	15 / 98	▼6	9 / 58	▼1	Coalition
2006	Haris Silajdžić	2nd	190,148	22.16	24 / 98	▲9	9 / 58	Steady	Coalition
2010	Haris Silajdžić	5th	78,086	7.63	9 / 98	▼15	0 / 58	▼9	Opposition
2014	Amer Jerlagić	8th	32,790	3.30	3 / 98	▼6	0 / 58	Steady	Opposition
2018	Amer Jerlagić	12th	23,007	2.30	0 / 98	▼3	1 / 58	▲1	Opposition
2022	Semir Efendić	8th	36,465	3.74	4 / 98	▲4	1 / 80	Steady	Opposition
2026	Semir Efendić	4th	71,873	8.98	9 / 98	▲5	TBD	TBD	TBD

=== Presidency elections ===
Presidency of Bosnia and Herzegovina
Election year	#	Candidate	Votes	%	Representing	Elected?
1996	2nd	Haris Silajdžić	124,396	13.6%	Bosniaks	No
1998	1st	Alija Izetbegović (Note: Member of the SDA.)	511,541	86.8%	Bosniaks	Yes
2002	2nd	Haris Silajdžić	179,726	34.8%	Bosniaks	No
2006	1st	Haris Silajdžić	350,520	62.8%	Bosniaks	Yes
2010	3rd	Haris Silajdžić	117,240	25.1%	Bosniaks	No
2018	6th	Amer Jerlagić	9,655	1.66%	Bosniaks	No
2022	1st	Željko Komšić (Note: Member of the DF.)	227,540	55.8%	Croats	Yes
2026	3rd	Semir Efendić	149,541	25.6%	Bosniaks	No

=== Cantonal elections ===
Cantonal election	Cantonal Assembly										
Cantonal election	Una-Sana	Posavina	Tuzla	Zenica-Doboj	Bosnian Podrinje Goražde	Central Bosnia	Herzegovina-Neretva	West Herzegovina	Sarajevo	Canton 10	Total won / Total contested
1996	3 / 50	0 / 20	5 / 50	6 / 59	4 / 31	1 / 55	2 / 50	0 / 31	6 / 45	0 / 15	27 / 406
1998	33 / 50	5 / 30	26 / 50	29 / 50	21 / 31	22 / 50	18 / 50	0 / 31	25 / 45	4 / 30	182 / 417
2000	5 / 30	1 / 19	4 / 35	6 / 35	8 / 25	4 / 28	4 / 28	0 / 21	10 / 35	1 / 23	43 / 279
2002	5 / 30	1 / 21	6 / 35	6 / 35	8 / 25	5 / 30	5 / 30	0 / 23	10 / 35	1 / 25	47 / 289
2006	6 / 30	1 / 21	7 / 35	11 / 35	8 / 25	7 / 30	5 / 30	0 / 23	13 / 35	1 / 25	59 / 289
2010	3 / 30	1 / 21	3 / 35	4 / 35	4 / 25	2 / 30	2 / 30	0 / 23	4 / 35	0 / 25	23 / 289
2014	0 / 30	0 / 21	3 / 35	2 / 35	2 / 25	0 / 30	0 / 30	0 / 23	0 / 35	0 / 25	7 / 289
2018	0 / 30	0 / 21	2 / 35	1 / 35	2 / 25	0 / 30	0 / 30	0 / 23	0 / 35	0 / 25	5 / 289
2022	1 / 30	0 / 21	2 / 35	0 / 35	2 / 25	0 / 30	0 / 30	0 / 23	5 / 35	0 / 25	10 / 289
2026	2 / 30	1 / 21	2 / 35	3 / 35	2 / 25	2 / 30	0 / 30	0 / 23	7 / 35	1 / 25	20 / 289
