= Bosnian-Herzegovinian Initiative =

Political party in Bosnia and Herzegovina

Bosnian-Herzegovinian Initiative Bosanskohercegovačka inicijativa
- President: Fuad Kasumović
- Founder: Fuad Kasumović
- Founded: 19 February 2022
- Headquarters: Islambegovića put 2, Zenica
- Ideology: Pro-Europeanism; Atlanticism
- Political position: Centre-left
- HoR BiH: 0 / 42
- HoP BiH: 0 / 15
- HoR FBiH: 1 / 98
- HoP FBiH: 1 / 80
- NA RS: 0 / 83

Website
- bhikf.ba

The Bosnian-Herzegovinian Initiative (Bosnian: Bosanskohercegovačka inicijativa; abbreviated BHI KF) is a political party in Bosnia and Herzegovina, founded in 2022 by mayor of Zenica Fuad Kasumović.

== History ==
The Bosnian-Herzegovinian Initiative was founded by mayor of Zenica Fuad Kasumović on 19 February 2022.

In the 2022 general election, the party contested all levels of government except for the Presidency. It gained one seat in the national House of Representatives and the Federal House of Representatives.

== List of presidents ==
#	Name (Born–Died)	Portrait	Term of Office	
1	Fuad Kasumović (b. 1958)		19 February 2022	present

== Election results ==
=== Parliamentary Assembly of Bosnia and Herzegovina ===
Parliamentary Assembly of Bosnia and Herzegovina
Year	Leader	#	Popular vote	%	HoR	Seat change	HoP	Seat change	Government
2022	Fuad Kasumović	20th	20,259	1.28	1 / 42	New	0 / 15	New	Support
2026	Fuad Kasumović	20th	9,502	0.70	0 / 42	▼1	0 / 15	0	Extra-parliamentary

=== Parliament of the Federation of Bosnia and Herzegovina ===
Parliament of the Federation of Bosnia and Herzegovina
Year	Leader	#	Popular vote	%	HoR	Seat change	HoP	Seat change	Government
2022	Fuad Kasumović	12th	18,150	1.86	1 / 98	New	0 / 80	New	Support
2026	Fuad Kasumović	12th	8,681	1.13	1 / 98	0	TBD	TBD	TBD

=== Cantonal elections ===
Cantonal election	Cantonal Assembly										
Cantonal election	Una-Sana	Posavina	Tuzla	Zenica-Doboj	Bosnian Podrinje Goražde	Central Bosnia	Herzegovina-Neretva	West Herzegovina	Sarajevo	Canton 10	Total won / Total contested
2022	0 / 30	0 / 21	0 / 35	5 / 35	0 / 25	0 / 30	0 / 30	0 / 23	0 / 35	0 / 25	5 / 289
