= Communist Party (Bosnia and Herzegovina) =

Communist Party Komunistička partija
- Abbreviation: KP
- President: Muhamed Imamović
- Founded: 21 February 2012
- Headquarters: Alije Imamovića 44, Sarajevo
- Ideology: Communism
- Political position: Far-left
- Colors: Red
- Ethnic group: Multi-ethnic

The Communist Party (Serbo-Croatian: Komunistička partija / Комунистичка партија, KP) was a communist party from Bosnia and Herzegovina. It was formed in February 2012 and merged in April with the League of Communists of Banja Luka.

The KP took part in the general elections of 2014. It candidated for the House of Representatives winning 5051 votes (0.31%) and no seats.

== See also ==
- Workers' Communist Party of Bosnia and Herzegovina
