= Elvedin Sedić =

Bosnian politician and entrepreneur

Elvedin Sedić (born 1982) is a Bosnian politician and entrepreneur who has served as the Mayor of Bihać since February 2023. A member of the POMAK, he previously served as a member of the Bihać City Council from 2020 to 2022. Sedić became leader of the party in December 2023.

== Early life and education ==
Born in Zagreb in 1982, Sedić graduated from the Faculty of Law at the University of Bihać as one of the top students in his generation, earning the Silver Plaque of the Rector of the University of Bihać. He later earned his master's degree from LMU Munich and pursued doctoral studies at the Faculty of Law at the University of Vienna.

In addition to his academic background, Sedić worked for more than 15 years as an associate professor and teaching assistant for constitutional law at the University of Bihać.

== Political career ==
Sedić entered local politics by serving as a city councilor in the City Council of Bihać from 2020 to 2022. Following political changes, he ran for office and was elected Mayor of Bihać in the snap local elections held in February 2023. He secured a regular term in the local elections in 2024.

== Personal life ==
Sedić is married and a father of four children.
