= Parliamentary Assembly of Bosnia and Herzegovina =

Highest legislative body of the country

Parliamentary Assembly of Bosnia and Herzegovina Parlamentarna skupština Bosne i Hercegovine Парламентарна скупштина Босне и Херцеговине
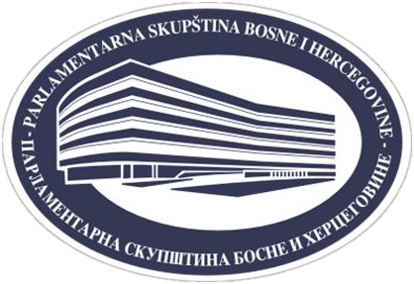

Type
- Type: Bicameral
- Houses: House of Peoples; House of Representatives

History
- Founded: 3 January 1997; 29 years ago

Leadership
- Chairman of the House of Peoples: Dragan Čović (HDZ BiH) since 16 June 2026
- Chairman of the House of Representatives: Darko Babalj (SDS) since 1 April 2026

Structure
- House of Peoples political groups: Bosniak caucus (5): SDA (2); DF (1); SBiH (1); CL (1); Croat caucus (5): HDZ BiH (3); HDZ 1990 (1); Independent (1); Serb caucus (5): SNSD (3); SDS (1); PDP (1)
- House of Representatives political groups: Government (Cabinet of Borjana Krišto) (20) SNSD (6) SDP BiH (5) HDZ BiH (4) NS (3) NiP (2) Supported by (3) DEMOS (1) US (1) BHI (1) Opposition (19) SDA (8) DF–GS (3) SDS (2) PDP (2) NES (2) ZPR (1) NPD (1)
- Salary: €2,564 per month

Elections
- Last House of Representatives election: 4 October 2026

Meeting place
- Parliament Building; Sarajevo, Bosnia and Herzegovina; 43°51′16.48″N 18°24′20.63″E

Website
- www.parlament.ba

The Parliamentary Assembly of Bosnia and Herzegovina (Serbo-Croatian: Parlamentarna skupština Bosne i Hercegovine / Парламентарна скупштина Босне и Херцеговине) is the bicameral legislative body of Bosnia and Herzegovina. It consists of the following two chambers.

- The House of Peoples (Dom naroda / Дом народа) has 15 members, appointed by the parliaments of the entities: 5 members elected by the National Assembly of Republika Srpska (5 Serb delegates), 5 members - by the Bosniak caucus of the House of Peoples of the Parliament of the Federation of Bosnia and Herzegovina (5 Bosniak delegates) and 5 members - by the Croat caucus of the House of Peoples of the Parliament of the Federation of Bosnia and Herzegovina (5 Croat delegates).
- The House of Representatives (Bosnian and Serbian: Predstavnički dom / Представнички дом, Croatian: Zastupnički dom) has 42 members, elected for four-year terms by proportional representation.

Its predecessors were the unicameral Assembly of Bosnia and Herzegovina and the People's Assembly of SR Bosnia and Herzegovina.

== Presidents (1953–1997) ==
=== Presidents of the People's Assembly (1953–1992) ===
No.	Portrait	Name (Birth–Death)	Term of Office		Party
Presidents of the People's Assembly of Bosnia and Herzegovina
1		Đuro Pucar (1899–1979)	December 1953	June 1963	SK BiH
2		Ratomir Dugonjić (1916–1987)	June 1963	1967	SK BiH
3		Džemal Bijedić (1917–1977)	1967	30 July 1971	SK BiH
4		Hamdija Pozderac (1924–1988)	30 July 1971	1978	SK BiH
5		Niko Mihaljević	1978	1981	SK BiH
6		Vaso Gačić	1981	1983	SK BiH
7		Ivica Blažević	1983	1984	SK BiH
8		Salko Oruč	1984	1987	SK BiH
9		Savo Čečur	1987	1989	SK BiH
10		Zlatan Karavdić	1989	20 December 1990	SK BiH
11		Momčilo Krajišnik (1945–2020)	20 December 1990	3 March 1992	SDS

=== Speakers of the Assembly (1992–1997) ===
No.	Portrait	Name (Birth–Death)	Term of Office		Party
Presidents of the Assembly of Bosnia and Herzegovina
1		Momčilo Krajišnik (1945–2020)	3 March 1992	29 October 1992	SDS
2		Abdulah Konjicija (1929–2004)	29 October 1992	25 December 1992	SDA
3		Miro Lazović (1954–)	25 December 1992	3 January 1997	SDP BiH

== See also ==
- Politics of Bosnia and Herzegovina
- Historical assemblies:
  - Stanak
  - Diet of Bosnia
- List of legislatures by country
