= Movement of Democratic Action =

Bosniak political party

Movement of Democratic Action Pokret demokratske akcije
- President: Elzina Pirić
- Founder: Mirsad Kukić
- Founded: 24 March 2018
- Split from: Party of Democratic Action
- Headquarters: Fra Grge Martića 8, Tuzla
- Ideology: Bosniak nationalism; Conservatism; Tuzla regionalism; Euroscepticism
- Political position: Centre-right
- HoR BiH: 0 / 42
- HoP BiH: 0 / 15
- HoR FBiH: 1 / 98
- HoP FBiH: 0 / 80
- NA RS: 0 / 83

Website
- pdabih.org

The Movement of Democratic Action (Bosnian: Pokret demokratske akcije or PDA) is a conservative political party in Bosnia and Herzegovina.

== History ==
The party was founded by Mirsad Kukić in 2018. After Kukić was removed from the SDA Cantonal committee of Tuzla canton, because he worked against the party's by-law, he announced he would be making his own party named Movement of Democratic Action. He accused SDA of not working in the interest of the people of Tuzla canton, rather that they were only "working for personal gains". The PDA claims that it will work based on the ideas of former SDA presidents Alija Izetbegović and Sulejman Tihić.

In the 2018 general elections, the PDA managed to obtain 38,417 (2.32%) votes and one seat in the House of Representatives.

== List of presidents ==
#	Name (Born–Died)	Portrait	Term of Office	
1	Mirsad Kukić (1958–2024)		24 March 2018	23 January 2022
2	Elzina Pirić (b. 1980)		23 January 2022	present

== Election results ==
=== Parliamentary Assembly of Bosnia and Herzegovina ===
Parliamentary Assembly of Bosnia and Herzegovina
Year	Leader	#	Popular vote	%	HoR	Seat change	HoP	Seat change	Government
2018	Mirsad Kukić	12th	38,417	2.32	1 / 42	New	0 / 15	New	Opposition
2022	Elzina Pirić	22nd	14,889	0.94	0 / 42	▼1	0 / 15	0	Extra-parliamentary
2026 (Note: Run as part of Together BiH (NES, NPD and PDA) which won a single seat that went to NES.)	Elzina Pirić	11th	33,324	2.46	0 / 42	0	0 / 15	0	Extra-parliamentary

=== Cantonal elections ===
Cantonal election	Cantonal Assembly										
Cantonal election	Una-Sana	Posavina	Tuzla	Zenica-Doboj	Bosnian Podrinje Goražde	Central Bosnia	Herzegovina-Neretva	West Herzegovina	Sarajevo	Canton 10	Total won / Total contested
2018	0 / 30	1 / 21	7 / 35	0 / 35	0 / 25	0 / 30	0 / 30	0 / 23	0 / 35	0 / 25	8 / 289
2022	0 / 30	1 / 21	3 / 35	0 / 35	0 / 25	0 / 30	0 / 30	0 / 23	0 / 35	0 / 25	4 / 289
