= Nermin Ogrešević =

Bosnian politician (born 1972)

Mayor of Cazin
- Incumbent
- Assumed office 2004

Personal details
- Born: 19 December 1972 (age 53) Cazin, SR Bosnia and Herzegovina, SFR Yugoslavia
- Party: NES (since 2021)
- Other political affiliations: SDA (until 2007); A-SDA (2008–2021)
- Spouse: Elvira Ogrešević
- Children: 2
- Education: University of Tuzla

Nermin Ogrešević (born 1972) is a Bosnian politician serving as the mayor of Cazin since 2004. He has been the president of the People's European Union (NES) since its founding in 2021, previously being a member of the Party of Democratic Action until 2007.

== Early life ==
Ogrešević was born in 1972 in Cazin, SR Bosnia and Herzegovina, SFR Yugoslavia. He completed his primary and secondary education in his hometown before attending the Faculty of Economics at the University of Tuzla, where he earned a bachelor's degree in economics in 1999. In 2011, he obtained a master's degree from the private University for Business Engineering and Management (PIM) in Banja Luka.

Following his graduation in Tuzla, Ogrešević worked at Privredna banka d.d. in Bihać and subsequently at the fund management company Kapital Invest. He later continued his career as deputy director of the public utility enterprise "Komunalije" in Cazin until 2003.

== Political career ==
Ogrešević entered public office in 2003 as an elected member of the Assembly of the Una-Sana Canton. Originally a member of the Party of Democratic Action (SDA), he left the party in 2007 to co-found the Party of Democratic Activity (A-SDA). He served as the president of A-SDA from 2014 until February 2021, when the party merged with the Independent Bosnian-Herzegovinian List (NBL) to form the People's European Union (NES), after which Ogrešević assumed the presidency of the new political alliance.

In 2004, Ogrešević was elected Mayor of Cazin for the first time, becoming one of the youngest mayors in Bosnia and Herzegovina. He was subsequently re-elected to the mayoral office in the 2008, 2012, 2016, and 2020 municipal elections.

== Personal life ==
Ogrešević is married to Elvira Ogrešević, with whom he has two daughters.
