= Semir Efendić =

Bosnian politician (born 1983)

Municipal Mayor of Novi Grad Sarajevo
- Incumbent
- Assumed office 12 November 2012
- Preceded by: Aner Šuman (acting)

Personal details
- Born: 4 September 1983 (age 43) Goražde, SR Bosnia and Herzegovina, SFR Yugoslavia
- Party: Party for Bosnia and Herzegovina (since 2021)
- Other political affiliations: Party of Democratic Action (2001–2021)
- Spouse: Aida Efendić
- Children: 1
- Education: University of Sarajevo (BA); University of Malaya (MPA)

Semir Efendić (born 4 September 1983) is a Bosnian politician who has served as municipal mayor of Novi Grad Sarajevo since 2012. He currently serves as president of the Party for Bosnia and Herzegovina since 2021, having previously been a member of the Party of Democratic Action.

== Early life and education ==
Semir Efendić was born on 4 September 1983 in Goražde, SFR Yugoslavia, present-day Bosnia and Herzegovina. He graduated from the Faculty of Political Sciences in Sarajevo in 2007. He later earned a master's degree in public administration at the University of Malaya in Kuala Lumpur.

== Political career ==
Efendić began his political career as a member of the Party of Democratic Action (SDA) in 2001. From 2007 to 2009, he worked at the Ministry of Education and Science of the Sarajevo Canton. During his postgraduate studies in 2009, he was also employed in the private company MAC's Medical in Tuzla, where he remained until 2012.

In the 2012 municipal elections, Efendić was elected municipal mayor of Novi Grad Sarajevo, the most populous municipality in the capital. He was subsequently re-elected in 2016, 2020, and 2024, maintaining strong electoral support. He left the SDA and joined the Party for Bosnia and Herzegovina (SBiH) in April 2021, where he immediately became the party's new president.

In January 2026, Efendić announced his bid for election in the October 2026 general election, running for member of the Presidency of Bosnia and Herzegovina member and representing the Bosniaks. Despite failing to get elected, Efendić outperformed expectations, earning nearly 150,000 votes, or 25.61%, while the SBiH more than doubled its vote total from the 2022 general election, gaining seats in both the national and Federal House of Representatives, as well as in the cantonal assemblies.

== Legal issues ==
In April 2020, Efendić was given a one-year suspended sentence in connection with a 2018 traffic accident that resulted in a fatality.

== Personal life ==
Efendić is married and has a daughter.

Political offices
Preceded by Aner Šuman (acting)	Municipal Mayor of Novi Grad Sarajevo; 2012–present	Incumbent
