= Democratic Front (Bosnia and Herzegovina) =

Political party in Bosnia and Herzegovina

Democratic Front Demokratska fronta Демократски фронт
- Abbreviation: DF
- President: Željko Komšić
- Secretary General: Dženan Đonlagić
- Vice Presidents: See list: Milan Dunović Zlatan Begić Alma Kratina
- Founded: 7 April 2013; 13 years ago
- Split from: Social Democratic Party
- Headquarters: Saliha Udžvarlića 10, Sarajevo
- Ideology: Liberalism; Social democracy; Political unitarism; Civic nationalism; Pro-Europeanism
- Political position: Centre to centre-left
- National affiliation: DF–GS
- Colours: Orange
- Slogan: "Za građansku državu!" "For a civic state!"
- HoR BiH: 2 / 42
- HoP BiH: 1 / 15
- HoR FBiH: 6 / 98
- HoP FBiH: 9 / 80
- NA RS: 0 / 83

Website
- www.fronta.ba

The Democratic Front (Bosnian: Demokratska fronta, DF / Демократски фронт, ДФ) is a multi-ethnic social-liberal political party in Bosnia and Herzegovina. Its founder and current leader is Željko Komšić, the incumbent Croat member of the Presidency of Bosnia and Herzegovina.

== History ==
The Democratic Front was founded by Željko Komšić on 7 April 2013, the current Croat member of the Presidency of Bosnia and Herzegovina, who left the Social Democratic Party in July 2012.

== List of presidents ==
#	Name (Born–Died)	Portrait	Term of Office	
1	Željko Komšić (b. 1964)		7 April 2013	present

== Election results ==
=== Parliamentary Assembly of Bosnia and Herzegovina ===
Parliamentary Assembly of Bosnia and Herzegovina
Year	Leader	#	Popular vote	%	HoR	Seat change	HoP	Seat change	Government
2014	Željko Komšić	4th	150,767	9.24	5 / 42	New	1 / 15	New	Coalition (2014–2016)
2014	Željko Komšić	4th	150,767	9.24	5 / 42	New	1 / 15	New	Opposition (2016–2018)
2018 (Note: Run in coalition with GS, and won all the seats obtained by the coalition.)	Željko Komšić	6th	96,174	5.81	3 / 42	▼2	1 / 15	0	Coalition
2022	Željko Komšić	6th	101,713	6.41	3 / 42	0	1 / 15	0	Opposition
2026	Željko Komšić	9th	51,088	3.77	2 / 42	▼1	TBD	TBD	TBD

=== Parliament of the Federation of Bosnia and Herzegovina ===
Parliament of the Federation of Bosnia and Herzegovina
Year	Leader	#	Popular vote	%	HoR	Seat change	HoP	Seat change	Government
2014	Željko Komšić	3rd	128,058	12.90	14 / 98	New	5 / 58	New	Coalition (2014–2015)
2014	Željko Komšić	3rd	128,058	12.90	14 / 98	New	5 / 58	New	Opposition (2015–2018)
2018	Željko Komšić	4th	93,708	9.36	10 / 98	▼4	2 / 58	▼3	Opposition
2022	Željko Komšić	4th	107,735	11.04	12 / 98	▲2	7 / 80	▲5	Opposition
2026	Željko Komšić	6th	45,580	6.04	6 / 98	▼6	TBD	TBD	TBD

=== Presidency elections ===
Presidency of Bosnia and Herzegovina
Election year	#	Candidate	Representing	Votes	%	Elected?
2014	3rd	Emir Suljagić	Bosniaks	114,334	15.2%	No
2014	4th	Anto Popović	Croats	7,179	2.9%	No
2018	1st	Željko Komšić	Croats	225,500	52.6%	Yes
2022	1st	Željko Komšić	Croats	227,540	55.8%	Yes
2026	2nd	Slaven Kovačević	Croats	76,655	30.6%	No

=== Cantonal elections ===
Cantonal election	Cantonal Assembly										
Cantonal election	Una-Sana	Posavina	Tuzla	Zenica-Doboj	Bosnian Podrinje Goražde	Central Bosnia	Herzegovina-Neretva	West Herzegovina	Sarajevo	Canton 10	Total won / Total contested
2014	4 / 30	0 / 21	4 / 35	5 / 35	2 / 25	3 / 30	2 / 30	0 / 23	7 / 35	0 / 25	27 / 289
2018	2 / 30	0 / 21	3 / 35	3 / 35	2 / 25	2 / 30	1 / 30	0 / 23	3 / 35	0 / 25	16 / 289
2022 (Note: Run in coalition with GS.)	3 / 30	0 / 21	4 / 35	3 / 35	1 / 25	2 / 30	2 / 30	0 / 23	4 / 35	0 / 25	19 / 289
