= House of Representatives of the Federation of Bosnia and Herzegovina =

Lower house of the FBiH parliament

House of Representatives Predstavnički dom Zastupnički dom Представнички дом
- 9th legislature

Type
- Type: Lower house

Leadership
- Chairperson: Vacant
- Vice-chairpeople: Mladen Bošković (HDZ BiH); Azra Okić (SDP BiH)

Structure
- Seats: 98
- Political groups: Government (44) SDP BiH (14) HDZ BiH (14) NiP (7) NS (5) HDZ 1990 (3) SN (1) Supported by (7) NES (3) Independent (1) PDA (1) SPU (1) HNP (1) Opposition (47) SDA (26) DF–GS (13) SBiH (2) Independent (2) SBB (1) POMAK (1) HRS (1) HSS (1)
- Length of term: 4 years

Elections
- Last election: 4 October 2026
- Next election: 6 October 2030

Meeting place
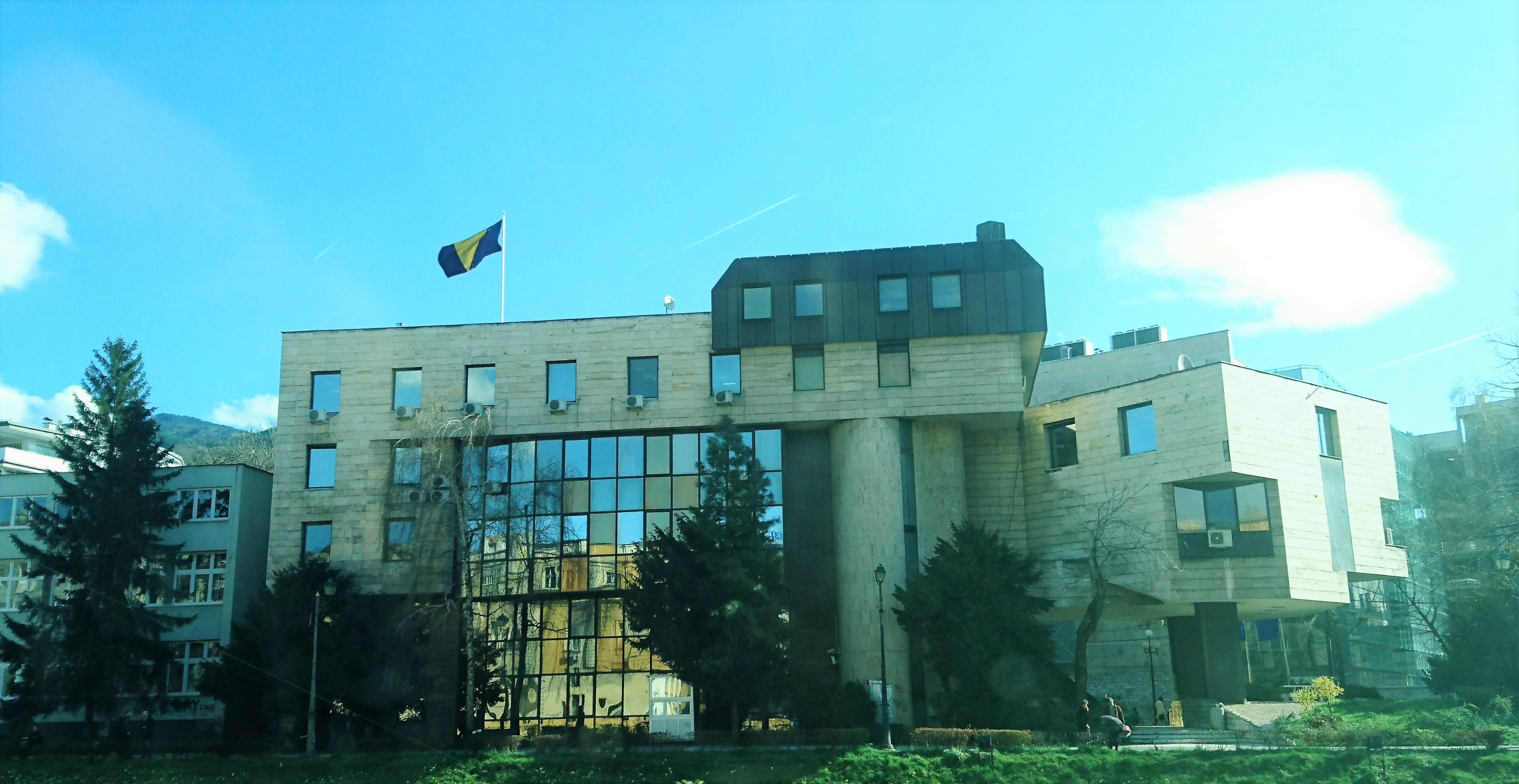
- Federal Parliament Building; Sarajevo, Bosnia and Herzegovina

Website
- predstavnickidom-pfbih.gov.ba

The House of Representatives of the Federation of Bosnia and Herzegovina (Bosnian: Predstavnički Dom Federacije Bosne i Hercegovine, Croatian: Zastupnički Dom Federacije Bosne i Hercegovine and Serbian Cyrillic: Представнички Дом Федерације Босне и Херцеговине) is one of the two chambers of the Parliament of the Federation of Bosnia and Herzegovina, with the other being the House of Peoples of the Federation of Bosnia and Herzegovina. The chamber consists of 98 members which are elected by party-list proportional representation.

== Electoral system ==
The house has a total of 98 members who are elected by proportional representation. The election takes place in 12 multi-person constituencies with entity-wide balancing mandates. In the House of Representatives, each constitutive ethnic group should be represented by at least four members. The threshold is three percent.

== Composition ==
Party	Votes	%	+/–	Seats			
Party	Votes	%	+/–	Direct	Comp.	Total	+/−
Party of Democratic Action	238,111	24.40	−0.85	21	5	26	−1
Social Democratic Party	131,323	13.46	−1.07	11	4	15	−1
Croatian Democratic Union and allies (Note: HDZ–HSSSR–HSS–HSP–HKDU–HSPAS–HDU–HSPHB–HRAST–HNL)	130,567	13.38	−0.97	12	3	15	−1
Democratic Front–Civic Alliance	107,735	11.04	+1.68	10	2	12	+2
NiP–SPU	67,200	6.89	+4.57	3	4	7	+5
Our Party	50,815	5.21	+0.12	2	4	6	±0
People's European Union	42,322	4.34	New	4	1	5	New
Party for Bosnia and Herzegovina	36,465	3.74	+1.44	2	2	4	+4
Union for a Better Future of BiH	27,597	2.83	−4.22	0	0	0	−8
Croatian Democratic Union 1990	26,518	2.72	+0.16	3	0	3	+1
Movement of Democratic Action	18,312	1.88	−1.89	1	0	1	−3
Bosnian-Herzegovinian Initiative	18,150	1.86	New	1	0	1	New
PzP–NB–ZzD	15,090	1.55	−1.94	0	0	0	−4
Bosnian Party	13,577	1.39	+0.68	0	0	0	±0
Croatian Republican Party	13,050	1.34	+0.67	1	0	1	+1
Social Democrats	11,639	1.19	New	0	0	0	New
Croatian National Shift	5,351	0.55	New	1	0	1	New
For New Generations	5,334	0.55	New	0	0	0	New
Movement for a Modern and Active Krajina	4,465	0.46	New	1	0	1	New
Labour Party	3,808	0.39	−0.40	0	0	0	−1
Alliance of Independent Social Democrats	3,133	0.32	New	0	0	0	New
Bosnian-Herzegovinian Patriotic Party	2,292	0.23	−1.17	0	0	0	±0
Liberal Party	899	0.09	New	0	0	0	New
People's Party Work for Prosperity	850	0.09	New	0	0	0	New
Coalition for Human (DNZ BiH–DNS)	746	0.08	−0.11	0	0	0	±0
Bosnian-Herzegovinian Greens	597	0.06	New	0	0	0	New
Total	975,946	100.00	–	73	25	98	13
Valid votes	975,946	92.42					
Invalid votes	35,594	3.37					
Blank votes	44,472	4.21					
Total votes	1,056,012	100.00					
Registered voters/turnout	2,109,344	50.06					
Source: CEC

== See also ==
- Parliament of the Federation of Bosnia and Herzegovina
- House of Peoples of the Federation of Bosnia and Herzegovina
