= Pensioners' Party of Bosnia and Herzegovina =

Multi-ethnic political party in Bosnia and Herzegovina

The Pensioners' Party of Bosnia and Herzegovina (Stranka penzionera-umirovljenika Bosne I Hercegovine, abbreviated SPU) is a multi-ethnic political party in Bosnia and Herzegovina that advocates pensioners' interests. The party was founded in December 2001 with the merging of the Democratic Pensioners' Party of Bosnia and Herzegovina (DSP BiH) and the Pensioners' Party of the Federation of Bosnia and Herzegovina (SP FBiH).
