= House of Peoples of the Federation of Bosnia and Herzegovina =

Upper house of the Federation of Bosnia and Herzegovina

House of Peoples of the Federation of Bosnia and Herzegovina Dom naroda Federacije Bosne i Hercegovine Дом народа Федерације Босне и Херцеговине

Type
- Type: Upper house

Leadership
- Chairman: Tomislav Martinović (HDZ BiH)
- Vice-chairmen: Nezim Alagić (NiP); Slađan Ilić (SDP BiH)

Structure
- Seats: 80
- Political groups: Bosniak caucus (23): SDA (12); NiP (4); NES (2); SDP BiH (1); DF (1); NS (1); SBiH (1); BHI (1); Croat caucus (23): HDZ BiH (13); HDZ 1990 (3); SDP BiH (1); NiP (1); NES (1); HNP (1); ZNG (1); BNS (1); HDS (1); Serb caucus (23): SDP BiH (7); SDA (3); HDZ BiH (3); DF (3); SNSD (2); NS (1); LS BiH (1); NP (1); SNS (1); SNP (1); Others caucus (11): DF (5); SDP BiH (2); NS (2); SBiH (1); NES (1)
- Length of term: 4 years

Elections
- Last election: 17 January 2023

Meeting place
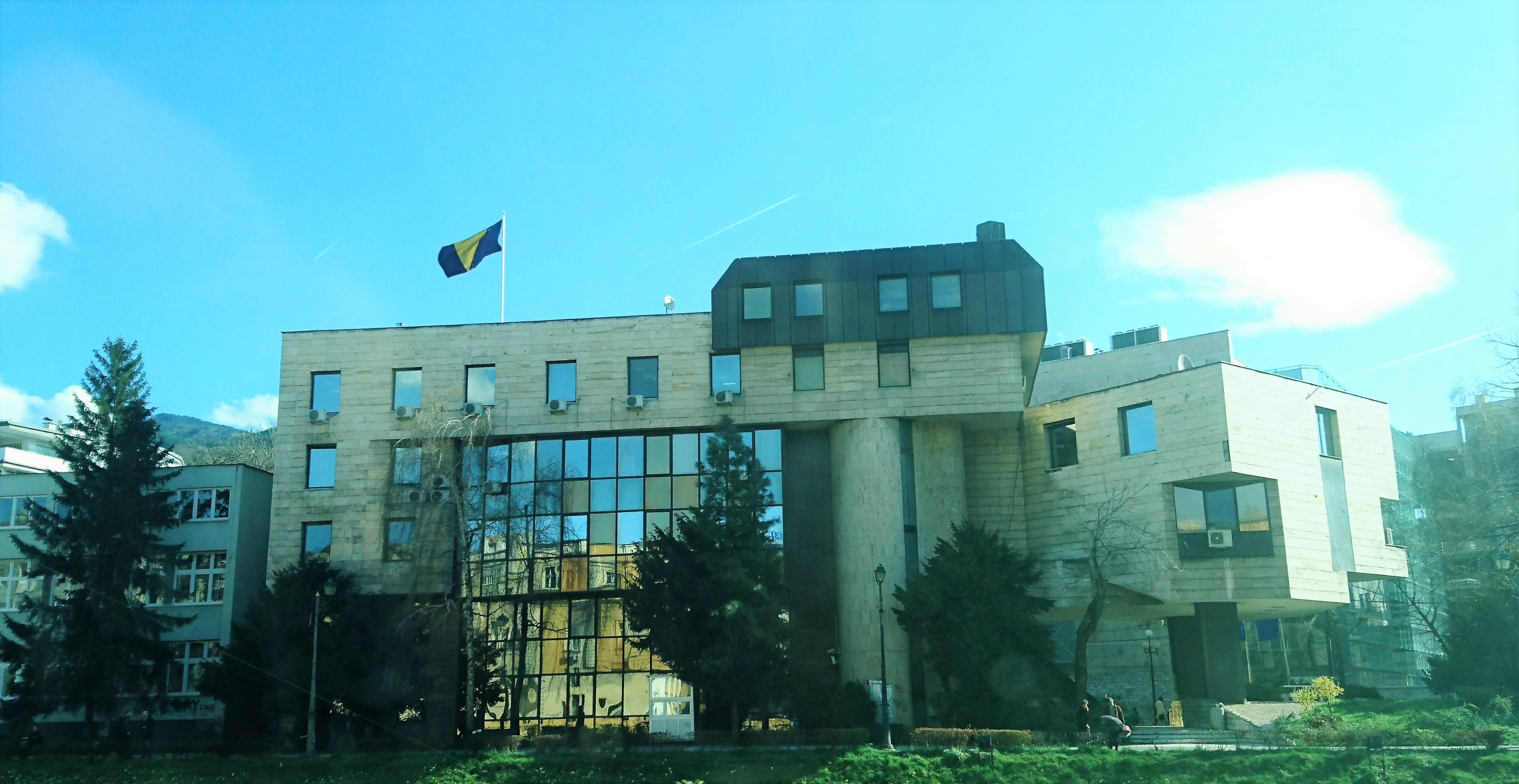
- Federal Parliament Building; Sarajevo, Bosnia and Herzegovina

The House of Peoples of the Federation of Bosnia and Herzegovina (Serbo-Croatian: Dom naroda Federacije Bosne i Hercegovine/Дом народа Федерације Босне и Херцеговине) is one of the two chambers of the Parliament of the Federation of Bosnia and Herzegovina, with the other chamber being the House of Representatives of the Federation of Bosnia and Herzegovina. Federal laws need to be passed by both houses.

The House of Peoples is composed out of 23 delegates from each of the constituent nations of the Federation of Bosnia and Herzegovina; Bosniaks, Croats and Serbs as well as 11 delegates of the minorities referred to as Others. The House of Peoples has one chairman and two vice-chairmen.

In July 2017, the Constitutional Court of Bosnia and Herzegovina struck down provisions of the election law regulating the indirect election of delegates to the Federal House of Peoples. The court had previously, in 2016, declared these provisions unconstitutional, and decided that the rules should be changed to ensure legitimate representation in the election of Bosniak, Croat and Serb members to the Federal House of Peoples.

On 2 October 2022, High Representative Christian Schmidt imposed constitutional and legal changes called Measures to improve Federation Functionality. This increased the number of delegates from each of the constituent nations from 17 to 23, and for others from 7 to 11, thus increasing the House of Peoples from 58 to 80 delegates.

== Delegates ==
Allocation of mandates upon the decision of the High Representative for Bosnia and Herzegovina from 2 October of 2022.

Canton	Bosniak	Croat	Serb	Others	Total
Una-Sana	3	1	3	1	8
Posavina	1	1	1	1	4
Tuzla	5	1	3	1	10
Zenica-Doboj	4	2	2	1	9
Bosnian-Podrinje	1	1	1	1	4
Central Bosnia	2	4	1	1	8
Herzegovina-Neretva	1	5	2	1	9
West Herzegovina	1	4	1	1	7
Sarajevo	4	1	5	2	12
10	1	3	4	1	9
Total	23	23	23	11	80

== Current composition ==
Caucus	Party	Canton										Total
Caucus	Party	Una-Sana Canton	Posavina Canton	Tuzla Canton	Zenica-Doboj Canton	Bosnian-Podrinje Canton Goražde	Central Bosnia Canton	Herzegovina-Neretva Canton	West Herzegovina Canton	Name of Page	Canton 10	Total
Bosniak	SDA	1	1	1	3	1	2	1	0	1	1	12
Bosniak	NiP	1	0	0	1	1	0	0	0	1	0	4
Bosniak	NES	1	0	1	1	0	0	0	0	0	0	2
Bosniak	SDP BiH	0	0	0	0	0	0	0	0	0	0	1
Bosniak	DF	0	0	0	0	0	1	0	0	0	0	1
Bosniak	NS	0	0	0	0	0	0	0	0	1	0	1
Bosniak	SBiH	0	0	0	0	0	0	0	0	1	0	1
Bosniak	SD BiH	0	0	1	0	0	0	0	0	0	0	1
Croat	HDZ BiH	0	1	0	0	0	4	4	4	0	1	14
Croat	HDZ 1990	0	0	0	0	0	1	1	0	0	1	3
Croat	SDP BiH	0	0	0	1	0	0	0	0	0	0	1
Croat	NiP	0	0	1	0	0	0	0	0	0	0	1
Croat	NES	1	0	0	0	0	0	0	0	0	0	1
Croat	HNP	0	0	0	0	0	0	0	0	0	1	1
Croat	BNS	0	0	0	0	1	0	0	0	0	0	1
Croat	DF	0	0	0	0	0	0	0	0	1	0	1
Serb	SDP BiH	1	0	1	1	0	1	1	0	2	0	7
Serb	SDA	0	0	0	0	0	0	1	0	2	0	3
Serb	HDZ BiH	0	1	0	0	0	0	1	1	0	0	3
Serb	DF	0	0	1	1	0	0	0	0	1	0	2
Serb	SNSD	0	0	0	0	0	0	0	0	0	2	2
Serb	NS	0	0	0	0	0	0	0	0	1	0	1
Serb	LS BiH	0	0	0	0	1	0	0	0	0	0	1
Serb	SNP FBIH	0	0	0	0	0	0	0	0	0	1	1
Serb	SNS BiH	0	0	0	0	0	0	0	0	0	1	1
Serb	NP	0	0	0	0	1	0	0	0	0	0	1
Serb	Independent	0	0	1	0	0	0	0	0	0	0	1
Others	DF	0	0	2	0	0	0	1	0	1	0	4
Others	SDP BiH	0	0	1	1	0	0	0	0	1	0	3
Others	NS	0	0	0	0	0	0	0	0	2	0	2
Others	SBiH	0	0	0	0	0	0	0	0	1	0	1
Others	NES	1	0	0	0	0	0	0	0	0	0	1
Total		6	3	10	9	5	9	9	5	16	8	80

== See also ==
- Parliament of the Federation of Bosnia and Herzegovina
- House of Representatives of the Federation of Bosnia and Herzegovina
