= List of heads of cantons of the Federation of Bosnia and Herzegovina =

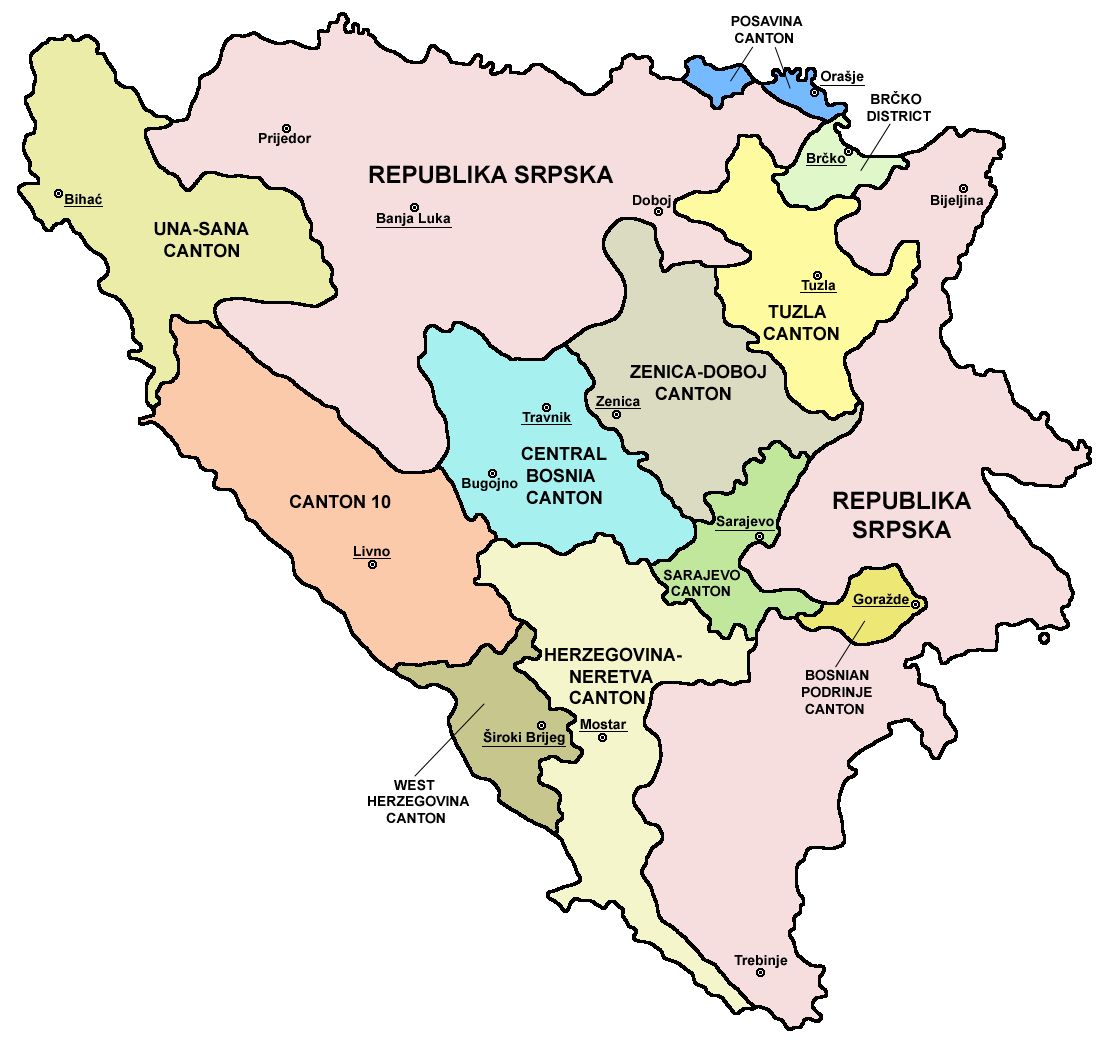
The ten cantons of the Federation of Bosnia and Herzegovina

This is a list of current heads of cantons of the Federation of Bosnia and Herzegovina.

== Table ==
Canton		Current Prime Minister Date of birth	Party	Took office	Current cabinet
1	Una-Sana	Mustafa Ružnić; 5 April 1976 (age 50)	People's European Union	23 September 2025	NES; DF; SBiH; SDP; NiP
2	Posavina	Đuro Topić; 1972	Croatian Democratic Union	30 January 2019	HDZ BiH; SDP
3	Tuzla	Irfan Halilagić; 10 July 1988 (age 38)	Party of Democratic Action	1 March 2025	SDA; DF
4	Zenica-Doboj	Nezir Pivić; 4 July 1983 (age 43)	Party of Democratic Action	26 October 2023	SDA; DF; SBB; NES
5	Bosnian-Podrinje Goražde	Senad Čeljo; 11 January 1977 (age 49)	People and Justice	13 November 2025	NiP; SBB; NP; NPI; NGL; BHD
6	Central Bosnia	Tahir Lendo 9 February 1961 (age 65)	Party of Democratic Action	10 May 2011	SDA; HDZ BiH
7	Herzegovina-Neretva	Marija Buhač; 30 July 1981 (age 45)	Croatian Democratic Union	9 November 2023	HDZ BiH; SDA; SDP
8	West Herzegovina	Predrag Čović; 11 January 1969 (age 57)	Croatian Democratic Union	27 March 2023	HDZ BiH
9	Sarajevo	Nihad Uk; 10 July 1989 (age 37)	Our Party	24 March 2023	NiP; SDP; NS
10	Canton 10	Ivan Vukadin; 1975	Croatian National Shift	21 December 2020	HNP; HDZ 1990; SDA; SNSD

== See also ==
- Assemblies of the cantons of the Federation of Bosnia and Herzegovina
