= 2022 Federation of Bosnia and Herzegovina general election =

Entity election in Bosnia and Herzegovina

- 2 October 2022
- 98 seats in the House of Representatives; 50 seats needed for a majority
- Turnout: 50.06% (▼1.77 pp)
Party	Leader	Vote %	Seats	+/–
SDA	Bakir Izetbegović	24.40	26	−1
SDP BiH	Nermin Nikšić	13.46	15	−1
HDZ BiH and allies	Dragan Čović	13.38	15	−1
DF–GS	Željko Komšić	11.04	12	+2
NiP–SPU	Elmedin Konaković	6.89	7	+5
NS	Edin Forto	5.21	6	0
NES	Nermin Ogrešević	4.34	5	+3
SBiH	Semir Efendić	3.74	4	+4
HDZ 1990	Ilija Cvitanović	2.72	3	+1
PDA	Elzina Pirić	1.88	1	−3
BHI	Fuad Kasumović	1.86	1	New
HRS	Slaven Raguž	1.34	1	+1
HNP	Ivan Vukadin	0.55	1	New
POMAK	Šuhret Fazlić	0.46	1	+1
This lists parties that won seats. See the complete results below.
Prime Minister before	Prime Minister after
Fadil Novalić; SDA	Nermin Nikšić; SDP

General elections were held in the Federation of Bosnia and Herzegovina on 2 October 2022 as part of the Bosnian general elections. Voters elected the 98 members of the House of Representatives of the Federation of Bosnia and Herzegovina and the assemblies of the cantons of the Federation of Bosnia and Herzegovina.

Christian Schmidt, the High Representative for Bosnia and Herzegovina, imposed changes to the country's electoral law after voting hours ended for the election. The changes prominently included an expansion of the Federal House of Peoples from 56 to 80 members, changes in the election process for the house as well as changes in the election process for the president and vice presidents of the Federation of Bosnia and Herzegovina.

The Party of Democratic Action (SDA) emerged as the largest party in the House of Representatives, winning 26 of the 98 seats. The Social Democratic Party (SDP BiH) and the Croatian Democratic Union (HDZ BiH) each won 15 seats. The Democratic Front won 12 seats, while People and Justice won 7 seats, up five from the previous general election in 2018. Our Party repeated its result from the previous election, winning six seats.

In spite of the SDA emerging as the largest party, its failure to form a functional coalition led to the liberal alliance Troika and the HDZ BiH to form a coalition alongside the Croatian Democratic Union 1990, with SDP BiH leader Nermin Nikšić getting appointed as the new Prime Minister in April 2023, albeit after interventions by the High Representative.

== Electoral system ==
=== Presidency ===
The president of the Federation of Bosnia and Herzegovina and the two vice-presidents are not elected by direct election: The first chamber of the Federal Parliament, the House of Peoples, nominates candidates for the presidency and the vice-presidencies, followed by the second chamber, the House of Representatives, must confirm this nomination by election. Subsequently, confirmation by the majority of the delegates of all three constitutive ethnic groups in the House of Peoples is required.

=== House of Representatives ===
The House of Representatives of the Federation of Bosnia and Herzegovina has a total of 98 members who are elected by proportional representation. The election takes place in 12 multi-person constituencies with entity-wide balancing mandates. In the Federal House of Representatives, each constitutive ethnic group should be represented by at least four members. The threshold is three percent.

=== Cantonal Assemblies ===
The assemblies of the 10 cantons of the Federation are also elected. The election is based on proportional representation with a threshold of three percent. The individual cantonal assemblies send members to the House of Peoples.

== Results ==
=== House of Representatives ===
Party	Votes	%	+/–	Seats			
Party	Votes	%	+/–	Direct	Comp.	Total	+/−
Party of Democratic Action	238,111	24.40	−0.85	21	5	26	−1
Social Democratic Party	131,323	13.46	−1.07	11	4	15	−1
Croatian Democratic Union and allies (Note: HDZ–HSSSR–HSS–HSP–HKDU–HSPAS–HDU–HSPHB–HRAST–HNL)	130,567	13.38	−0.97	12	3	15	−1
Democratic Front–Civic Alliance	107,735	11.04	+1.68	10	2	12	+2
NiP–SPU	67,200	6.89	+4.57	3	4	7	+5
Our Party	50,815	5.21	+0.12	2	4	6	±0
People's European Union	42,322	4.34	+1.06	4	1	5	+3
Party for Bosnia and Herzegovina	36,465	3.74	+1.44	2	2	4	+4
Union for a Better Future	27,597	2.83	−4.22	0	0	0	−8
Croatian Democratic Union 1990	26,518	2.72	+0.16	3	0	3	+1
Movement of Democratic Action	18,312	1.88	−1.89	1	0	1	−3
Bosnian-Herzegovinian Initiative	18,150	1.86	New	1	0	1	New
PzP–NB–ZzD	15,090	1.55	−1.94	0	0	0	−4
Bosnian Party	13,577	1.39	+0.68	0	0	0	±0
Croatian Republican Party	13,050	1.34	+0.67	1	0	1	+1
Social Democrats	11,639	1.19	New	0	0	0	New
Croatian National Shift	5,351	0.55	New	1	0	1	New
For New Generations	5,334	0.55	New	0	0	0	New
Movement for a Modern and Active Krajina	4,465	0.46	New	1	0	1	New
Labour Party	3,808	0.39	−0.40	0	0	0	−1
Alliance of Independent Social Democrats	3,133	0.32	New	0	0	0	New
Bosnian-Herzegovinian Patriotic Party	2,292	0.23	−1.17	0	0	0	±0
Liberal Party	899	0.09	New	0	0	0	New
People's Party Work for Prosperity	850	0.09	New	0	0	0	New
Coalition for Human (DNZ BiH–DNS)	746	0.08	−0.11	0	0	0	±0
Bosnian-Herzegovinian Greens	597	0.06	New	0	0	0	New
Total	975,946	100.00	–	73	25	98	16
Valid votes	975,946	92.42					
Invalid votes	35,594	3.37					
Blank votes	44,472	4.21					
Total votes	1,056,012	100.00					
Registered voters/turnout	2,109,344	50.06					
Source: CEC

Vote share
SDA	24.40%
SDP	13.46%
HDZ	13.38%
DF–GS	11.04%
NiP–SPU	6.89%
NS	5.21%
NES	4.34%
SBiH	3.74%
SBB	2.83%
HDZ 1990	2.72%
Others	11.99%

=== Assemblies of the Cantons ===
==== Una-Sana ====
Una-Sana
Party	Votes	%	Seats	+/–
SDA	22,943	25.39	8	-1
NES	21,733	24.05	8	+4
SDP	9,362	10.36	3	-1
DF–GS	7,874	8.71	3	+1
POMAK	7,864	8.70	3	-1
NiP	4,300	4.76	2	+2
Labour Party	3,888	4.30	1	-2
SBiH–SPU	3,251	3.60	1	+1
NS	2,890	3.20	1	0
SBB	1,647	1.82	–	-2
PzP–NB–ZzD	1,611	1.78	–	-1
DNZBiH–DNS–NSRzB	930	1.03	–	0
Others	2,063	2.28	–	–
Total	90,356	100.00	30	–
Valid votes	90,356	90.90		
Invalid votes	5,220	5.25		
Blank votes	3,825	3.85		
Total votes	99,401	100.00		
Registered voters/turnout	259,935	38.24		
Source: CEC

==== Posavina ====
Posavina
Party	Votes	%	Seats	+/–
HDZ BiH	7,699	52.71	12	+1
SDA	1,625	11.13	3	+1
HDZ 1990	1,135	7.77	2	-1
SDP	927	6.35	1	0
HRS	558	3.82	1	+1
Nezavisni-Neovisni	516	3.53	1	+1
PDA	502	3.44	1	0
Posavina Party	391	2.68	–	-2
HSP BiH	366	2.51	–	0
SNSD	309	2.12	–	0
HSP-HB-BiH	251	1.72	–	0
SBB	248	1.70	–	-1
Others	78	0.53	–	–
Total	14,605	100.00	21	–
Valid votes	14,605	93.75		
Invalid votes	643	4.13		
Blank votes	331	2.12		
Total votes	15,579	100.00		
Registered voters/turnout	40,443	38.52		
Source: CEC

==== Tuzla ====
Tuzla
Party	Votes	%	Seats	+/–
SDA	60,814	30.21	13	+4
SDP	37,189	18.47	8	-2
DF–GS	20,748	10.31	4	+1
PDA	16,153	8.02	3	-4
SBiH	10,934	5.43	2	0
NiP	10,607	5.27	2	+2
SD BiH	8,037	3.99	2	+2
NS	7,056	3.51	1	-1
SBB	5,134	2.55	–	-2
NES	4,886	2.43	–	0
PzP	4,723	2.35	–	0
BOSS	4,686	2.33	–	0
Others	10,335	5.13	–	–
Total	201,302	100.00	35	–
Valid votes	201,302	93.27		
Invalid votes	7,483	3.47		
Blank votes	7,033	3.26		
Total votes	215,818	100.00		
Registered voters/turnout	428,876	50.32		
Source: CEC

==== Zenica-Doboj ====
Zenica-Doboj
Party	Votes	%	Seats	+/–
SDA	45,831	29.23	11	0
BHI	23,006	14.67	5	New
SDP	20,095	12.82	5	-1
DF–GS	14,127	9.01	3	0
NiP	11,318	7.22	3	+3
HDZ BiH and allies (Note: HDZ–HSSSR–HSS–HSP–HKDU–HSPAS–HDU–HSPHB–HRAST–HDZ 1990–HNP)	10,965	6.99	3	0
NES	9,328	5.95	2	0
SBB	6,545	4.17	2	-1
NS	4,952	3.16	1	0
SBiH	4,014	2.56	–	-1
PzP–NB–ZzD	3,335	2.13	–	0
Others	3,272	2.09	–	–
Total	156,788	100.00	35	–
Valid votes	156,788	93.18		
Invalid votes	7,362	4.38		
Blank votes	4,105	2.44		
Total votes	168,255	100.00		
Registered voters/turnout	328,411	51.23		
Source: CEC

==== Bosnian-Podrinje Goražde ====
Bosnian-Podrinje Goražde
Party	Votes	%	Seats	+/–
SDA	2,134	15.17	5	0
NiP	1,453	10.33	3	+3
New Beginning	1,421	10.10	3	New
SDP	1,143	8.12	2	0
SBiH	1,090	7.75	2	0
NES	922	6.55	2	+1
New Political Initiative	918	6.52	2	New
Independent Civic List	655	4.66	1	New
Bosnian People's Party	654	4.65	1	New
Bosnian-Herzegovinian Democrats	620	4.41	1	New
DF–GS	596	4.24	1	-1
Liberal Party	570	4.05	1	-3
SBB	518	3.68	1	-1
Republican Party	408	2.90	–	0
NS	359	2.55	–	-1
PzP–NB–ZzD	356	2.53	–	0
Working for Betterness Goražde	216	1.54	–	0
Others	37	0.26	–	-6
Total	14,070	100.00	25	–
Valid votes	14,070	94.83		
Invalid votes	426	2.87		
Blank votes	341	2.30		
Total votes	14,837	100.00		
Registered voters/turnout	22,777	65.14		
Source: CEC

==== Central Bosnia ====
Central Bosnia
Party	Votes	%	Seats	+/–
SDA	36,479	33.40	11	+1
HDZ BiH and allies (Note: HDZ–HSSSR–HSS–HSP–HKDU–HSPAS–HDU–HRAST)	29,596	27.10	9	0
SDP	12,306	11.27	4	-1
NiP	8,469	7.75	2	+2
DF–GS	6,827	6.25	2	0
HDZ 1990–HSP-HB-BiH	5,390	4.94	2	+1
SBB	2,854	2.61	–	-2
SBiH	1,938	1.77	–	0
NS	1,541	1.41	–	0
Others	3,817	3.49	–	-1
Total	109,217	100.00	30	–
Valid votes	109,217	92.83		
Invalid votes	4,409	3.75		
Blank votes	4,033	3.43		
Total votes	117,659	100.00		
Registered voters/turnout	227,541	51.71		
Source: CEC

==== Herzegovina-Neretva ====
Herzegovina-Neretva
Party	Votes	%	Seats	+/–
HDZ BiH and allies (Note: HDZ–HSP–HDU–HSPAS–HRAST–HSPHB)	33,597	32.60	11	-2
SDA	19,975	19.38	7	-1
HDZ 1990	10,364	10.06	3	+1
SDP	10,263	9.96	3	0
HRS	7,499	7.28	2	+1
DF–GS	5,281	5.12	2	+1
NES	4,517	4.38	1	+1
NiP	3,518	3.41	1	+1
SBiH–PzP	2,873	2.79	–	0
SNSD–SDS	1,673	1.62	–	0
NS	1,553	1.51	–	0
SBB	1,298	1.26	–	-2
Others	652	0.63	–	–
Total	103,063	100.00	30	–
Valid votes	103,063	94.48		
Invalid votes	3,483	3.19		
Blank votes	2,533	2.32		
Total votes	109,079	100.00		
Registered voters/turnout	196,119	55.62		
Source: CEC

==== West Herzegovina ====
West Herzegovina
Party	Votes	%	Seats	+/–
HDZ BiH and allies (Note: HDZ–HDU–HSS–HKDU)	25,880	63.26	14	-2
HDZ 1990	6,483	15.85	4	+1
HRS	3,068	7.50	2	0
HSP BiH	1,971	4.82	1	0
HSP AS	1,713	4.19	1	0
HSP-HB-BiH	1,430	3.50	1	+1
Others	364	0.89	–	–
Total	40,909	100.00	23	–
Valid votes	40,909	96.64		
Invalid votes	1,213	2.87		
Blank votes	210	0.50		
Total votes	42,332	100.00		
Registered voters/turnout	74,553	56.78		
Source: CEC (confirmed results with 100.00% counted)

==== Sarajevo ====
Sarajevo
Party	Votes	%	Seats	+/–
SDA	39,209	18.26	7	-3
NiP	39,146	18.23	7	+1
SDP	33,818	15.75	6	+2
SBiH	27,619	12.86	5	+5
NS	25,383	11.82	5	0
DF–GS	19,488	9.07	4	+1
ZNG	8,194	3.82	1	New
NES	6,401	2.98	–	0
SBB	5,587	2.60	–	-4
Others	9,933	4.62	–	-3
Total	214,778	100.00	35	–
Valid votes	214,778	94.17		
Invalid votes	8,929	3.91		
Blank votes	4,376	1.92		
Total votes	228,083	100.00		
Registered voters/turnout	420,757	54.21		
Source: CEC

==== Canton 10 ====
10
Party	Votes	%	Seats	+/–
HNP	4,853	18.78	5	New
HDZ BiH	4,496	17.40	5	-3
HDZ 1990	4,328	16.75	4	0
SNSD	2,070	8.01	2	+2
HNL	1,876	7.26	2	-1
SDA	1,666	6.45	2	0
SDP	1,575	6.10	2	+1
SNS FBiH and allies (Note: SNS FBiH–SP–DNS–PDP–SDS)	1,155	4.47	1	0
SNP	1,032	3.99	1	+1
HRS	903	3.50	1	0
County Independent List	709	2.74	–	-1
Independent List-Croatian Bells	696	2.69	–	0
NSRzB	379	1.47	–	-1
Others	98	0.38	–	-3
Total	25,836	100.00	25	–
Valid votes	25,836	93.82		
Invalid votes	948	3.44		
Blank votes	755	2.74		
Total votes	27,539	100.00		
Registered voters/turnout	65,504	42.04		
Source: CEC

== Aftermath ==
On 29 November 2022, a coalition led by the liberal alliance Troika and the Croatian Democratic Union (HDZ BiH) reached an agreement on the formation of a new government for the 2022–2026 parliamentary term, designating Social Democratic Party president Nermin Nikšić as the new Federal Prime Minister. On 28 February 2023, Lidija Bradara (HDZ BiH) was elected president after a vote in the Federal House of Representatives. The House of Representatives confirmed the appointment of Nermin Nikšić and the government on 28 April 2023, following interventions by High Representative Christian Schmidt after months of political deadlock.

Former Federal Prime Minister, Fadil Novalić, who Nikšić succeeded following the election after Schmidt's intervention, at first refused to concede the power, and continues contesting his forceable deposing as illegal and unconstitutional. Nikšić's appointment was also deemed unconstitutional by the opposition, but was afterwards accepted.

== See also ==
- 2022 Bosnian general election
- 2022 Republika Srpska general election
