= 2022 Herzegovina-Neretva Canton parliamentary election =

Canton election in Bosnia and Herzegovina

2022 Herzegovina-Neretva parliamentary election
- 2 October 2022
- All 30 seats in the Assembly of the Herzegovina-Neretva Canton; 16 seats needed for a majority
- Turnout: 55.62% (▲0.58pp)
Party	Leader	Vote %	Seats	+/–
HDZ BIH coalition (Note: HSP BiH–HDU–HSP AS BiH–HRAST–HSP HB)	Slaven Zeljko	32.61	11	−2
SDA	Irma Memidžan	19.38	7	−1
HDZ 1990	Ivan Odak	10.06	3	+1
SDP BiH	Ismet Lulić	9.96	3	0
HRS	Vesna Šunjić	7.28	2	+1
DF–GS	Zoran Mikulić	5.12	2	+1
NES	Nermin Vrtić	4.38	1	+1
NiP	Omer Hujdur	3.41	1	+1
This lists parties that won seats. See the complete results below.
Results by municipality.
Prime Minister before	Prime Minister after
Nevenko Herceg; HDZ BiH	Marija Buhač; HDZ BiH

Parliamentary elections were held in the Herzegovina-Neretva Canton on 2 October 2022 as part of the 2022 Federation of Bosnia and Herzegovina general election to elect the members of the Assembly of the Herzegovina-Neretva Canton. Prior to the elections, the Government consisted of a coalition between the Croatian Democratic Union (HDZ BiH) and the Party of Democratic Action (SDA). This government had been in place since 2015 as HDZ BiH was unable to reach a coalition agreement after the 2018 election.

The electoral threshold required to win a seat in the Assembly is 3%. A two-thirds majority, or at least 20 representative votes, is required to confirm the appointment of the Government of the Herzegovina-Neretva Canton. HDZ BiH, SDA and the Social Democratic Party (SDP BiH) reached a coalition agreement and formed a new government in the canton after 9 years. The new prime minister was Marija Buhač from HDZ BiH, the first woman to be prime minister in the canton.

== Results ==
Party	Votes	%	Seats	+/–
Croatian Democratic Union coalition	33,597	32.61	11	-2
Party of Democratic Action	19,964	19.38	7	-1
Croatian Democratic Union 1990	10,365	10.06	3	+1
Social Democratic Party	10,260	9.96	3	0
Croatian Republican Party	7,499	7.28	2	+1
Democratic Front–Civic Alliance (Note: DF won both seats.)	5,276	5.12	2	+1
People's European Union	4,512	4.38	1	New
People and Justice	3,518	3.41	1	+1
Party for Bosnia and Herzegovina	2,872	2.79	0	0
Stay Here – Together for Our Mostar (Note: Coalition of SNSD and SDS.)	1,673	1.62	0	0
Our Party	1,553	1.51	0	0
Union for a Better Future	1,297	1.26	0	-2
Bosnian Party	342	0.33	0	0
Croatian Christian Democratic Union	165	0.16	0	0
Croatian Independent List	57	0.06	0	0
Croatian National Shift	47	0.05	0	New
Croatian Peasant Party - Stjepan Radić	41	0.04	0	0
Total	103,038	100.00	30	0
Valid votes	103,038	94.46		
Invalid/blank votes	6,041	5.54		
Total votes	109,079	100.00		
Registered voters/turnout	196,119	55.62		
Source: CEC
