= 2026 Canton 10 parliamentary election =

Cantonal election in Bosnia and Herzegovina

- 4 October 2026
- All 25 seats in the Assembly of Canton 10; 13 seats needed for a majority
- Turnout: 39.47% (▼2.57 pp) (Note: Turnout is calculated from 26,421 ballots cast and the 66,940 registered voters listed in the Central Election Commission decision for the register as at 4 October 2026. This is a change from 42.04% in 2022.)
Party	Leader	Vote %	Seats	+/–
HDZ BiH	Mate Omazić	27.72	7	+2
HNP	Ivan Vukadin	19.60	5	0
HDZ 1990	Nediljko Rimac	14.98	4	0
SNSD–SP–SPS	Goran Broćeta	9.27	2	0
HNL	Josip Perić	7.45	2	0
SNS FBiH	Duško Radun	4.66	1	0
SDA	Hikmet Hodžić	4.00	1	−1
SBiH	Ibrahim Velić	3.55	1	+1
SDP BiH	Martin Brdar	3.48	1	−1
SNP FBiH	Dragan Damjanović	3.00	1	0
This lists parties that won seats. See the complete results below.
Prime Minister before
Ivan Vukadin; HNP

The 2026 Canton 10 parliamentary election was held on 4 October 2026 to elect all 25 members of the Assembly of Canton 10 in Canton 10, one of the ten cantons of the Federation of Bosnia and Herzegovina. It was part of the 2026 Bosnian general election.

According to the published results, the Croatian Democratic Union of Bosnia and Herzegovina (HDZ BiH) received the most votes and won 7 of the 25 seats, up from 2 in 2022.

== Results ==
Results were reported from all 95 polling stations (100.00%). The count comprised 24,602 valid votes and 1,819 invalid ballots.

Percentages below are reproduced as reported and may not sum to 100%.

Final results
Party or alliance	Votes	%	Seats	Change from 2022 (Note: Seat changes compare the 2026 lists with their corresponding 2022 lists. SNSD–SP–SPS is compared with SNSD; SNS FBiH with Serb Concord (SNS FBiH–SP–DNS–PDP–SDS); and SNP FBiH with Serb Unity (SNP FBiH–SPS).)
HDZ BiH	6,821	27.72	7	+2
HNP	4,824	19.60	5	0
HDZ 1990	3,687	14.98	4	0
SNSD–SP–SPS	2,282	9.27	2	0
HNL	1,833	7.45	2	0
SNS FBiH	1,148	4.66	1	0
SDA	985	4.00	1	−1
SBiH	874	3.55	1	+1
SDP BiH	857	3.48	1	−1
SNP FBiH	740	3.00	1	0
DF–GS	248	1.00	0	0
HRS	172	0.69	0	−1
HSP BiH	133	0.54	0	0
Total	24,604	100.00	25	
Source: Central Election Commission of Bosnia and Herzegovina (votes and seat allocation; 2022 results for comparison).

Ballot totals and turnout
Ballot category	Number	% of ballots cast
Valid votes	24,604	93.12
Invalid votes, excluding blank ballots	1,335	5.06
Blank ballots	483	1.83
Total ballots cast	26,422	100.00
Registered voters (registered as at 4 October 2026)	66,940	—
Turnout	39.47% (▼2.57 pp)	
Source: Central Election Commission of Bosnia and Herzegovina.

Votes by voting method
Party or alliance	Regular	Postal	Absentee, mobile team and diplomatic/consular	Tendered	Total
HDZ BiH	6,141	573	80	27	6,821
HNP	3,728	959	126	11	4,824
HDZ 1990	3,384	253	40	10	3,687
SNSD–SP–SPS	1,754	398	109	21	2,282
HNL	1,714	99	13	7	1,833
SNS FBiH	879	212	43	14	1,148
SDA	844	112	28	1	985
SBiH	790	75	6	3	874
SDP BiH	777	57	18	5	857
SNP FBiH	665	34	38	3	740
DF–GS	201	37	10	0	248
HRS	160	9	2	1	172
HSP BiH	126	7	0	0	133
Total	21,163	2,825	513	103	24,604
Source: Central Election Commission of Bosnia and Herzegovina.
