= Šuhret Fazlić =

Bosnian politician (born 1961)

Mayor of Bihać
- In office 10 November 2016 – 11 November 2022
- Preceded by: Emdžad Galijašević
- Succeeded by: Elvedin Sedić

Personal details
- Born: 7 April 1961 (age 65) Bihać, PR Bosnia and Herzegovina, FPR Yugoslavia
- Party: People and Justice (2023–2025)
- Other political affiliations: POMAK (2018–2023); Civic Alliance (2016–2018) Social Democratic Party (1998–2016)
- Children: 2
- Education: University of Sarajevo (BA); Michigan State University

Šuhret Fazlić (born 17 April 1961) is a Bosnian politician who served as mayor of Bihać from 2016 to 2022. He was a member of the People and Justice party between 2023 and 2025.

Fazlić was born in Bihać in 1961, graduating from the Faculty of Political Science in Sarajevo. He worked for a number of Bihać-based companies and agencies.

Fazlić got into politics by joining the Social Democratic Party (SDP BiH) in 1998. He was a member of the SDP BiH until 2016, when he left it to join the Civic Alliance. He left the Civic Alliance in 2018 to establish the Movement for a Modern and Active Krajina (POMAK). Fazlić served as director of the Federal Privatization Agency from 2012 to 2015.

== Early life and education ==
Born on 17 April 1961, Fazlić attended schools in his hometown of Bihać, then graduated in political sciences from the University of Sarajevo in 1985. Fazlić also obtained a master's degree in human resources management from the University of Business Engineering and Management in Banja Luka in 2007, and as a recipient of the Hubert Humphrey Fellowship he attended a 1-year human resources management course at Michigan State University.

During the Bosnian War, he was a member of the command of the 5th Corps of the Army of the Republic of Bosnia and Herzegovina and the Military Police Battalion, in charge among others of the exchange of prisoners of war.

== Early career ==
Fazlić worked for the Bihać company Unatrans from 1985 to 1989, then as director of NIRIRO Krajina Bihać, head of the travel agency Unatrans Bihać, head of the commercial and financial sector of Autokomerc Bihać.

In the late 1990s, Fazlić worked as a representative of the Sarajevo-based company Jump, director of Galaxy Bihać, Im-ex Bihać, head of the Labor Inspectorate of the Una-Sana Canton, field agent for the World Bank / FBiH employment project for demobilized combatants (PIU PELRP) and head of the OHR Office for both the Una-Sana Canton and Canton 10.

== Political career ==
Initially a member of the Social Democratic Party, Fazlić was a member of the Una-Sana Cantonal assembly from 1998 to 2000. He was then a member of the Federal House of Representatives from 2000 to 2002. In the 2008 and 2012 municipal elections, he was elected municipal councilor in Bihać.

Fazlić was an advisor to the mayor of Bihać, to local businessman Halil Bajramović's company Rad putevi Bihać and to the Prime Minister of the Una-Sana Canton. He also served as director of the Federal Privatization Agency.

In the 2016 municipal elections, as a candidate of the Civic Alliance, Fazlić narrowly won the mayoral seat with 36.32% of the vote. Halil Bajramović financed half of his electoral campaign. Fazlić was strongly re-elected in the 2020 municipal elections as candidate of his POMAK party, winning 44,59%, a plurality of the vote.

Fazlić was elected to the Una-Sana Cantonal assembly in the 2022 general election, obtaining over 5,000 votes, amongst the most of all the candidates for the assembly. Due to him becoming a member of the assembly, he was forced to resign as mayor of Bihać.

== Personal life ==
Fazlić is married and has two sons. His wife works as a cashier at the University of Bihać's Faculty of Law.

Political offices
Preceded by Emdžad Galijašević	Mayor of Bihać; 2016–2022	Succeeded by Elvedin Sedić
