= Movement for a Modern and Active Krajina =

Political party in Bosnia and Herzegovina

Movement for a Modern and Active Krajina Pokret za Modernu i Aktivnu Krajinu
- Abbreviation: POMAK
- President: Elvedin Sedić
- Founder: Šuhret Fazlić
- Founded: 16 March 2018; 8 years ago
- Split from: Civic Alliance
- Headquarters: Harmanska bb, Bihać
- Ideology: Regionalism
- Political position: Centre
- HoR BiH: 0 / 42
- HoP BiH: 0 / 15
- HoR FBiH: 1 / 98
- HoP FBiH: 0 / 80

Website
- www.pomak.ba

Movement for a Modern and Active Krajina (Bosnian: Pokret za Modernu i Aktivnu Krajinu; abbreviated POMAK) is a regional political party in Bosnia and Herzegovina, founded in 2018 by Šuhret Fazlić, the former mayor of Bihać. The party seeks to strengthen the economy, healthcare, and education of Bosanska Krajina, while increasing the political influence of the region and Una-Sana Canton in the institutions of Bosnia and Herzegovina. POMAK argues that Bosanska Krajina has been politically and economically neglected by governments at the state and federal levels since the 1990s.

== History ==
POMAK emerged from a political movement surrounding Fazlić and councillors in the Bihać City Council who had previously been members of the Civic Alliance. Fazlić was re-elected as mayor in the 2020 municipal elections. In the 2024 municipal elections, he was succeeded as mayor of Bihać by Elvedin Sedić.

The movement's political alliances have changed over time. At the 2018 general election, POMAK supported Denis Bećirović's candidacy for the Presidency of Bosnia and Herzegovina. In the 2022 general election, it instead supported Bakir Izetbegović. After 2022, POMAK developed close relations with the parties of the Troika coalition, particularly People and Justice and its leader Elmedin Konaković. Fazlić himself joined People and Justice in 2023, but subsequently left the party and returned to POMAK in 2025. Relations between POMAK and the Troika later deteriorated, with Fazlić arguing that the interests of Una-Sana Canton were not receiving sufficient attention. By 2026, POMAK had joined a coalition outside the Troika and begun cooperating with the Party of Democratic Action, Democratic Front and Party for Bosnia and Herzegovina.

A central theme of POMAK's political platform is the idea of a "united Krajina" voice in the federal and state institutions of Bosnia and Herzegovina. The party advocates greater investment in the region and has particularly emphasized infrastructure and development projects, including improved highway connections between cities and the development of Bihać Airport.

In the 2022 Federation of Bosnia and Herzegovina general election, POMAK won three seats in the Assembly of Una-Sana Canton and one seat in the House of Representatives of the Federation of Bosnia and Herzegovina, where Maja Uremović was elected. Since 2026, Ibrahim Dizdarić, a member of POMAK, has served as Prime Minister of Una-Sana Canton.

== List of presidents ==
#	Name (Born–Died)	Portrait	Term of Office	
1	Šuhret Fazlić (b. 1961)		16 March 2018	2 December 2023
2	Elvedin Sedić (b. 1982)		2 December 2023	present

== Electoral history ==
=== Parliament of the Federation of Bosnia and Herzegovina ===
Parliament of the Federation of Bosnia and Herzegovina
Year	#	Popular vote	%	HoR	Seat change	HoP	Seat change	Government
2022	19th	4,465	0.46	1 / 98	New	0 / 80	New	Support
2026	14th	5,930	0.77	1 / 98	0	TBD	TBD	TBD

=== Cantonal elections ===
Cantonal election	Cantonal Assembly										
Cantonal election	Una-Sana	Posavina	Tuzla	Zenica-Doboj	Bosnian Podrinje Goražde	Central Bosnia	Herzegovina-Neretva	West Herzegovina	Sarajevo	Canton 10	Total won / Total contested
2022	3 / 30	0 / 21	0 / 35	0 / 35	0 / 25	0 / 30	0 / 30	0 / 23	0 / 35	0 / 25	3 / 289
