= 2022 Canton 10 parliamentary election =

Cantonal election in Bosnia and Herzegovina

- 2 October 2022
- All 25 seats in the Assembly of Canton 10; 13 seats needed for a majority
- Turnout: 42.04% (▼2.73 pp)
Party	Leader	Vote %	Seats	+/–
HNP	Ivan Vukadin	18.78	5	New
HDZ BiH	Dragan Konta	17.40	5	−3
HDZ 1990	Nediljko Rimac	16.75	4	0
SNSD	Nikola Materić	8.01	2	−1
HNL	Matko Ćurković	7.26	2	−1
SDA	Hikmet Hodžić	6.45	2	0
SDP BiH	Hana Milak	6.10	2	+1
Serb Concord (SNS FBiH–SP–DNS–PDP–SDS)	Duško Radun	4.47	1	0
Serb Unity (SNP FBiH–SPS)	Dragana Damjanović	3.99	1	New
HRS	Ivica Brešić	3.50	1	0
This lists parties that won seats. See the complete results below.
Prime Minister before	Prime Minister after
Ivan Vukadin; HNP	Ivan Vukadin; HNP

The 2022 Canton 10 parliamentary election was held on 2 October 2022 to elect all 25 members of the Assembly of Canton 10 in Canton 10, one of the ten cantons of the Federation of Bosnia and Herzegovina. It was part of the 2022 Bosnian general election.

The Croatian National Shift (HNP) received the most votes. HNP and the Croatian Democratic Union of Bosnia and Herzegovina (HDZ BiH) each won five seats, followed by HDZ 1990 with four. HDZ BiH lost three seats compared with 2018.

== Results ==
Results were reported from all 104 polling stations (100.00%). 16 lists contested the election, with 323 candidates. There were 25,836 valid votes and 1,703 invalid ballots. The results were certified on 2 November 2022. Percentages are reproduced as reported; rounding may cause totals to differ from 100%.

Final results
Party or alliance	Votes	%	Seats	Change from 2018 (Note: HDZ BiH is compared with the HDZ BiH-led coalition in 2018; SNSD is compared with the 2018 Serb List coalition; and Serb Concord is compared with the 2018 Serbian Progressive Party list. New electoral lists are compared with zero seats.)
HNP	4,853	18.78	5	+5
HDZ BiH	4,496	17.40	5	−3
HDZ 1990	4,328	16.75	4	0
SNSD	2,070	8.01	2	−1
HNL	1,876	7.26	2	−1
SDA	1,666	6.45	2	0
SDP BiH	1,575	6.10	2	+1
Serb Concord (SNS FBiH–SP–DNS–PDP–SDS)	1,155	4.47	1	0
Serb Unity (SNP FBiH–SPS)	1,032	3.99	1	+1
HRS	903	3.50	1	0
ŽNL	709	2.74	0	−1
Croatian Bells	696	2.69	0	0
NSRzB	379	1.47	0	−1
SBiH	53	0.21	0	0
HSP BiH	36	0.14	0	0
HSS SR	9	0.03	0	0
Total	25,836	100.00	25	
Source: Central Election Commission of Bosnia and Herzegovina.

Ballot totals and turnout
Ballot category	Number	% of ballots cast
Valid votes	25,836	93.82
Invalid votes, excluding blank ballots	948	3.44
Blank ballots	755	2.74
Total ballots cast	27,539	100.00
Registered voters	65,504	—
Turnout	42.04%	
Source: Central Election Commission of Bosnia and Herzegovina.

Votes by voting method
Party or alliance	Regular	Postal	Absentee, mobile team and diplomatic/consular	Tendered	Total
HNP	4,046	690	109	8	4,853
HDZ BiH	4,360	104	32	0	4,496
HDZ 1990	4,032	239	46	11	4,328
SNSD	1,706	255	90	19	2,070
HNL	1,818	54	4	0	1,876
SDA	1,439	178	47	2	1,666
SDP BiH	1,412	132	30	1	1,575
Serb Concord (SNS FBiH–SP–DNS–PDP–SDS)	1,029	58	61	7	1,155
Serb Unity (SNP FBiH–SPS)	990	11	30	1	1,032
HRS	882	20	0	1	903
ŽNL	699	7	3	0	709
HZ	680	12	3	1	696
NSRzB	371	2	6	0	379
SBiH	34	14	3	2	53
HSP BiH	36	0	0	0	36
HSS SR	8	1	0	0	9
Total	23,542	1,777	464	53	25,836
Source: Central Election Commission of Bosnia and Herzegovina.

== Government formation ==
Incumbent prime minister Ivan Vukadin of the Croatian National Shift remained in office after the election. On 14 February 2024, the Assembly confirmed a new government headed by Vukadin with 17 votes in favour and six against.
