= Halil Bajramović =

Bosnian politician

- Born: 18 August 1971 (age 54); Cazin, SR Bosnia and Herzegovina, SFR Yugoslavia
- Occupations: businessman, politician
- Political party: People and Justice (2018–present)

Halil Bajramović (born 18 August 1971) is a Bosnian politician and businessman.

During the Bosnian War, he joined the V Corps of the Army of the Republic of Bosnia and Herzegovina, which was defending the city of Bihać from the surrounding Army of Republika Srpska and from the maverick militia of Fikret Abdić. He was awarded a Golden lily.

In the post-war period, Bajramović grew to opulence in the Una-Sana Canton. He owns the local companies Rad, Rad Putevi, Džehveruša. Another of his companies, Dubrava, went bankrupt in 2007 and owns to the Bosnian state almost 500,000 euro in unpaid taxes.

At the 2016 elections in Bihac, Bajramović financed half of the victorious mayoral campaign of Šuhret Fazlić (GS), who narrowly won the seat with 8,933 votes against 8,180 for the SDA/SBB candidate and 5,084 for the SDP candidate.

At the 2018 Bosnian general election, Bajramović was a candidate for the Una-Sana cantonal assembly for (NiP). Although he obtained most preferences of all NiP candidates (298), with a total of 1,288 votes NiP did not get enough support to elect a deputy to the cantonal assembly.

In July 2018 Bajramović offered the derelict Hotel Sedra in Cazin for use as a reception centre for circa 100 families of migrants and refugees in Bosnia and Herzegovina. The rent of the hotel has since been paid by IOM with EU funds (25,000 EUR per month). He stated he plans to demolish and redevelop the facility at the end of the migrant crisis.

In autumn 2019, the cantonal authorities offered a Bajramović-owned farm in Medeno Polje (Bosanski Petrovac) to the Minister of Security Dragan Mektić, who refused to establish a migration reception centre in the location. Bajramović reiterated the offer of the Medeno Polje farm in 2019, but this was opposed by Bosnian Serb local residents.

On 23 December 2019 the Cantonal Court in Bihać confirmed the indictment against Bajramović and others for abuse of office. Bajramović is accused of false declarations to obtain a 500,000 euro loan from Hypo Alpe Adria in 2005, as well of subtracting 25,000 euro from the Dubrava company, of which he was a director. He is also accused of having founded a fictitious company to operate the Dubrava company between 2007 and 2009, when its accounts were blocked, thus defrauding the company's creditors.

In Summer 2020 Bajramović accused Federation entity prime minister Fadil Novalić (SDA) of being implicated in a scheme to concede facilitated access to brown coal in the Una-Sana Canton to Posušje-based firm Lager d.o.o., considered close to the HDZ BiH party.
