= Assemblies of the cantons of the Federation of Bosnia and Herzegovina =

The 10 Cantons of the Federation of Bosnia and Herzegovina are each governed by directly elected parliaments called assemblies. Each assembly is elected by at-large party-list proportional representation with open lists every four years at the same time as federal and entity elections.

== Responsibilities ==
The Federal government and the cantons are responsible, as legislative authorities, for

1. guaranteeing and enforcing human rights;
2. healthcare;
3. human environment protection policy;
4. communication and transport infrastructure, in accordance with the Constitution of Bosnia and Herzegovina;
5. social policy;
6. implementing aws and other regulations on citizenship and travel documents of the citizens of Bosnia and Herzegovina from the territory of the Federation;
7. tourism;
8. use of natural resources.

Additionally, the cantonal assemblies prepare and adopt their own cantonal constitutions by a two-thirds majority, enact other regulations for the exercise of cantonal powers, adopt each of their cantonal budgets, enact laws on taxation and otherwise ensure the necessary financing. After elections, the assemblies elects their respective Cantonal Governments, the prime minister and ministers.

== Table ==
This is the state of parties in the assemblies as of 13 March 2026.

Canton	Dominant Ethnicity	Seats	SDA	HDZ	SDP	NiP	DF	HDZ 1990	NES	SBiH	NS	HRS	PDA	SBB	Other
Una-Sana Canton	Bosniaks (90%)	30	8	-	3	4	2	-	8	1	-	-	-	-	2 (POMAK), 1 (Labour), 1 Independent
Posavina Canton	Croats (77%)	21	3	12	1	-	-	2	-	-	-	1	1	-	1 (Nezavisni-Neovisni)
Tuzla Canton	Bosniaks (88%)	35	16	-	8	2	3	-	-	2	1	-	1	-	2 (SD BiH)
Zenica-Doboj Canton	Bosniaks (82%)	35	13	2	5	3	3	-	1	-	1	-	-	1	2 (BHI), 3 Independent, 1(HDS)
Bosnian-Podrinje Canton Goražde	Bosniaks (94%)	25	5	-	2	3	1	-	2	2	-	-	-	1	3 (New Beginning), 2 (New Political Initiative), 1 (Independent Civic list), 1 (Bosnian People's Party), 1 (Bosnian-Herzegovinian Democrats), 1 (Liberal)
Central Bosnia Canton	Bosniaks (58%)	30	11	9	4	2	2	2	-	-	-	-	-	-	-
Herzegovina-Neretva Canton	Croats (53%)	30	7	11	3	1	2	3	1	-	-	2	-	-	-
West Herzegovina Canton	Croats (97%)	23	-	14	-	-	-	4	-	-	-	2	-	-	1 (HSP BiH), 1 (HSP AS), 1 (HSP-HB-BiH)
Sarajevo Canton	Bosniaks (83%)	35	7	-	7	5	4	-	-	3	4	-	-	-	5 Independent
Canton 10	Croats (77%)	25	2	5	1	-	-	4	-	-	-	1	-	-	5 (HNP), 2 (SNSD), 2 (HNL), 1 (SNP), 1 (SNS) 1 Independent
Federation of Bosnia and Herzegovina	Bosniaks (70%)	289	72	53	34	20	17	15	12	8	6	6	2	2	42 (19 parties)

== Diagrams ==
Una-Sana Canton

Posavina Canton

Tuzla Canton

Zenica-Doboj Canton

Bosnian-Podrinje Canton Goražde

Central Bosnia Canton

Herzegovina-Neretva Canton

West Herzegovina Canton

Sarajevo Canton

Canton 10

== See also ==
- Sarajevo Canton Assembly
- List of heads of cantons of the Federation of Bosnia and Herzegovina
