= Mirsad Hadžikadić =

Bosnian professor and politician (born 1955)

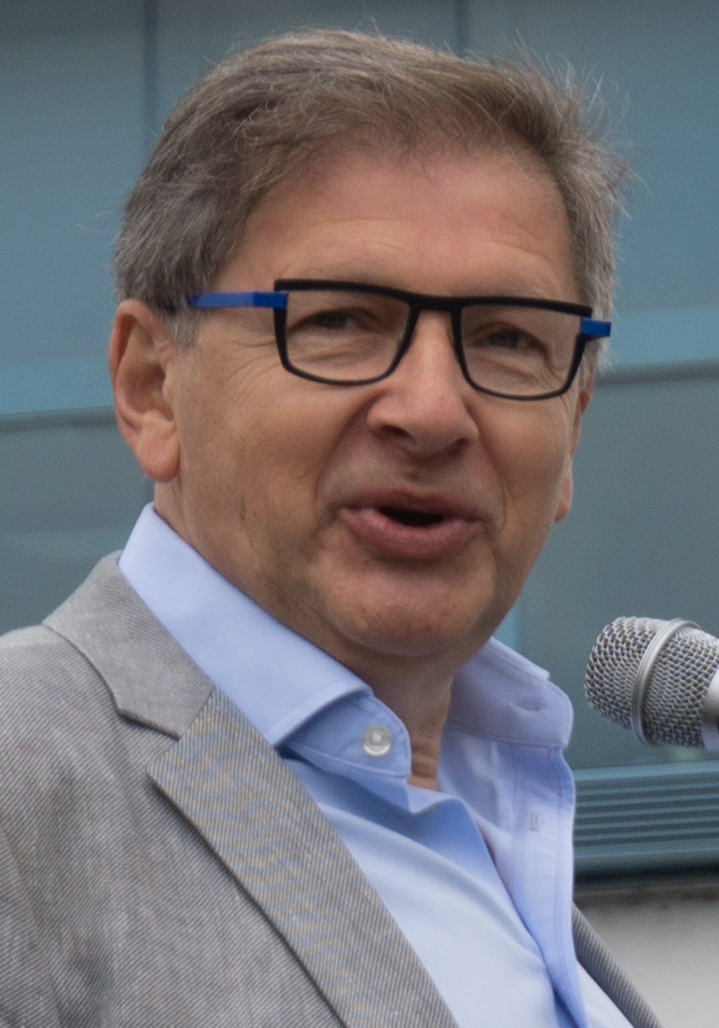
- Hadžikadić in 2021
- Born: 21 January 1955 (age 71); Banja Luka, PR Bosnia and Herzegovina, FPR Yugoslavia
- Education: Southern Methodist University (BCS, MCS, PhD)
- Political party: Platform for Progress
- Spouse: Mirzeta Hadžikadić
- Scientific career
- Thesis: Concept formation by heuristic classification (1987)
- Doctoral advisor: David Y. Y. Yun

Mirsad Hadžikadić (born 21 January 1955) is a Bosnian professor and politician. He is the current president of the Platform for Progress party.

Hadžikadić is also the director of the Institute of Complex Systems at the University of North Carolina at Charlotte. He ran for a seat in the Presidency of Bosnia and Herzegovina as a Bosniak member in the 2018 and 2022 general elections, but was unsuccessful both times.

== Early life and education ==
Hadžikadić was born on 21 January 1955 in Banja Luka, SFR Yugoslavia in a Bosniak household. In 1984, he moved to the United States, receiving a PhD in Computer Science at Southern Methodist University in 1987.

== Political career ==
In April 2018, Hadžikadić entered into politics after announcing that he would run in the 2018 Bosnian general election for the seat of Bosniak member of the Presidency of Bosnia and Herzegovina. He gathered 58,555 preferential votes, obtaining 10.09% of the total vote for the Bosniak seat. He leads the Platform for Progress party.

On 9 December 2021, Hadžikadić once again announced he would run in the 2022 general election for the Bosniak seat in the Presidency. He obtained only 5.38% in the election on 2 October 2022, failing to get elected again.
