= Reuf Bajrović =

Bosnian-American politician

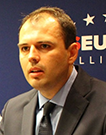

Federal Minister of Energy, Mining and Industry
- In office 31 March 2015 – 15 June 2015
- Prime Minister: Fadil Novalić
- Preceded by: Erdal Trhulj
- Succeeded by: Nermin Džindić

Personal details
- Born: 13 July 1977 (age 49) Sarajevo, SR Bosnia and Herzegovina, SFR Yugoslavia
- Party: Civic Alliance (from 2016)
- Other political affiliations: Democratic Front (2013–2015); Social Democratic Party (until 2012)
- Spouse: Ivana Cvetković-Bajrović
- Education: University of Louisville, University of Bologna,University of Buckingham

Reuf Bajrović (born 13 July 1977) is a Bosniak politician and policy analyst who is presently the Vice President of the US-Europe Alliance in Washington, DC, and a Fellow at Foreign Policy Research Institute.

Bajrović was appointed as Minister of Energy, Mining and Industry of the Federation of Bosnia and Herzegovina in the first cabinet of Fadil Novalić in 2015. His tenure as the Minister was shaped by his decision to send the Financial Police to all state-owned enterprises, especially those in the highly corrupt energy sector. Bajrović resigned after the Federation of Bosnia and Herzegovina Government blocked his attempts to disrupt the patronage system and appoint independent experts to key management positions in state-owned companies.

In April 2016, Bajrović created a new civically oriented party called Civic Alliance. At the October 2016 local elections, Civic Alliance won the mayorship in Bihać and council seats in other parts of the country.

Bajrović resigned as the party president and supported the appointment of new leadership at the party congress in September 2017, citing the need for new faces in the country's political life.

Previously, Bajrović led the Emerging Democracies Institute, a think tank in Washington, DC. Also, Bajrović was one of the architects of SDP BiH's election victory in 2010 as a close advisor of Zlatko Lagumdžija.

Bajrović supports the American Democratic Party. He publicly campaigned for Hillary Clinton in 2016 and Joe Biden in 2020 during the Iowa caucuses, where he served as a precinct captain for the campaign in Des Moines.

He made numerous media and public appearances including participating in several briefings at the United States Congress related to the Western Balkans and testifying before the Joint Committee on European Affairs of the Oireachtas, Ireland's National Parliament. Bajrovic’s op-eds and feature articles have appeared in The National Interest, Haaretz, The American Interest, Just Security, Tampa Bay Times, El Pais, Die Zeit, and other online and print media in the U.S., Europe, and the Middle East. He is a frequent commentator for major international media, including The New York Times, Financial Times, Wall Street Journal, TIME Magazine, Newsweek, PBS Newshour, and Al Jazeera English, among others. His academic and policy research was published by the United Nations Development Program (UNDP), Foreign Policy Research Institute (FPRI), Open Society Institute, Center for Policy and Governance (CPU), and Heinrich Boll Stiftung. He gave lectures at the Foreign Service Institute at the U.S. Department of State, as well as at Columbia, New York, American and other universities. In 2017, Bajrovic has signed the Declaration on the Common Language of the Croats, Serbs, Bosniaks and Montenegrins.

== Biography ==
Bajrović escaped with his family from Sarajevo on 11 April 1992, in the early stages of the Bosnian war. Mr. Bajrovic lived two and a half years in Turkey as a refugee, before leaving to the USA in 1994. He attended Seneca High School and the University of Louisville in Louisville, Kentucky. He also completed an MA in European Integration at the University of Bologna in 2002. Bajrovic hold a Doctor of Philosophy from the University of Buckingham.

Bajrović's father, Remzija stayed in Sarajevo from 1992 to 1994 working in the University of Sarajevo hospital as a renowned medical professional (orthopaedist). He was remembered as one of the many "Heroes in white" deserving gratitude of from the clinic and colleagues he was working with, as well as many citizens of Sarajevo.
