= List of heads of Canton 10 =

Prime Minister of Canton 10
- Premijer Kantona 10
- Incumbent; Ivan Vukadin since 21 December 2020
- Appointer: Canton 10 Cantonal Assembly
- Inaugural holder: Filip Andrić (as governor and prime minister)
- Formation: 26 March 1996

This is a list of heads of Canton 10.

== Heads of the Canton 10 (1996–present) ==
Croatian Democratic Union
Croatian Democratic Union 1990
Croatian National Shift

=== Governors ===
№	Portrait	Name (Born–Died)	Term of Office		Party
1		Filip Andrić (1960–2020)	26 March 1996	25 November 1996	HDZ BiH
2		Mirko Baković	25 November 1996	1998	HDZ BiH
3		Ivan Ivić	1998	22 May 2000	HDZ BiH
4		Ante Omazić (1963–)	22 May 2000	January 2001	HDZ BiH
5		Branko Zrno (1948–)	January 2001	April 2001	HDZ BiH
6		Dragan Bagarić	April 2001	6 October 2002	HDZ BiH

=== Prime Ministers ===
№	Portrait	Name (Born–Died)	Term of Office		Party
1		Filip Andrić (1960–2020)	26 March 1996	1998	HDZ BiH
2		Mirko Mihaljević (1962–)	1998	22 May 2000	HDZ BiH
3		Marko Bagarić (1961–)	22 May 2000	January 2001	HDZ BiH
4		Stipe Pelivan (1959–)	January 2001	25 April 2001	HDZ BiH
5		Ante Omazić (1963–)	25 April 2001	20 September 2002	HDZ BiH
(4)		Stipe Pelivan (1959–)	20 September 2002	12 January 2007	HDZ BiH
6		Nediljko Rimac (1961–)	12 January 2007	9 December 2013	HDZ 1990
7		Branko Ivković	9 December 2013	5 May 2015	HDZ BiH
8		Draško Dalić	5 May 2015	21 June 2017	HDZ BiH
9		Ivan Jozić	21 June 2017	21 December 2020	HDZ BiH
10		Ivan Vukadin (1975–)	21 December 2020	Incumbent	HNP
