= 2006 Canton 10 parliamentary election =

Cantonal election in Bosnia and Herzegovina

- 1 October 2006
- All 25 seats in the Assembly of Canton 10; 13 seats needed for a majority
- Turnout: 49.44%
Party	Leader	Vote %	Seats	+/–
Croat Unity (HDZ 1990) (Note: Seat comparisons use the following 2002 results: the HDZ–HKD–HNZ coalition for HDZ BiH, HKDU for Croat Unity, and the combined HSP and NHI results for HSP Đapić–Jurišić–NHI. Each 2002 seat is counted once.)	Nediljko Rimac	22.86	6	+4
HDZ BiH	Ivan Vukadin	17.65	5	−8
SNSD	Velimir Kunić	16.16	5	+2
HSP Đapić–Jurišić–NHI	Josip Perić	14.50	4	+3
SDA	Jasenko Tufekčić	6.35	2	0
SBiH	Ale Kamber	4.87	1	0
SDP BiH	Krunoslav Vrdoljak	4.75	1	0
NSRzB	Stjepan Matković	3.90	1	−1
This lists parties that won seats. See the complete results below.
Prime Minister before	Prime Minister after
Stipo Pelivan; HDZ BiH	Nediljko Rimac; HDZ 1990

The 2006 Canton 10 parliamentary election was held on 1 October 2006 to elect all 25 members of the Assembly of Canton 10 in Canton 10, one of the ten cantons of the Federation of Bosnia and Herzegovina. It was part of the 2006 Bosnian general election.

The Croat Unity coalition, led by HDZ 1990, won six of the 25 seats. The Croatian Democratic Union of Bosnia and Herzegovina (HDZ BiH) and the Alliance of Independent Social Democrats (SNSD) won five each; the HSP Đapić–Jurišić–NHI coalition won four; the Party of Democratic Action (SDA) won two; and the Party for Bosnia and Herzegovina (SBiH), the Social Democratic Party of Bosnia and Herzegovina (SDP BiH) and the People's Party Work for Prosperity (NSRzB) won one each.

== Results ==
19 lists contested the election. There were 23,384 valid votes and 1,859 invalid ballots. Seat comparisons are with the 2002 election.

Final results
Party or alliance	Votes	%	Seats	Change from 2002
Croat Unity (HDZ 1990–HZ–HSS–HKDU–HDU–HKD)	5,346	22.86	6	+4
HDZ BiH	4,127	17.65	5	−8
SNSD	3,779	16.16	5	+2
HSP Đapić–Jurišić–NHI	3,390	14.50	4	+3
SDA	1,484	6.35	2	0
SBiH	1,138	4.87	1	0
SDP BiH	1,110	4.75	1	0
NSRzB	912	3.90	1	−1
SDS	539	2.30	0	0
HB BiH	360	1.54	0	0
ZSD	228	0.98	0	0
PDP	218	0.93	0	0
HNZ–HSP	201	0.86	0	0
PB (BOSS–SDU BiH)	179	0.77	0	0
SP/U BiH	175	0.75	0	0
SP	106	0.45	0	0
DEPOS	58	0.25	0	0
PPM BiH	24	0.10	0	0
DNZ BiH	10	0.04	0	0
Total	23,384	100.00	25	
Source: Central Election Commission of Bosnia and Herzegovina (2006 results and comparison with 2002).

Ballot totals and turnout
Ballot category	Number	% of ballots cast
Valid votes	23,384	92.64
Invalid ballots	1,859	7.36
Total ballots cast	25,243	100.00
Registered voters	51,055	—
Turnout	49.44%	
Source: Central Election Commission of Bosnia and Herzegovina.

Valid votes by voting method
Voting method	Valid votes	% of valid votes
Regular	22,433	95.93
Postal	433	1.85
Absentee	405	1.73
Tendered	113	0.48
Total	23,384	100.00
Source: Central Election Commission of Bosnia and Herzegovina.

== Government formation ==
On 12 January 2007, the Assembly confirmed a new government headed by Nediljko Rimac (HDZ 1990), succeeding Stipo Pelivan (HDZ BiH).
