= 2022 Bosnian general election =

- 2 October 2022
- Turnout: 51.45% (presidential) ▼2.57 pp 51.45% (parliamentary) ▼2.58 pp
- Bosniak member of the presidency
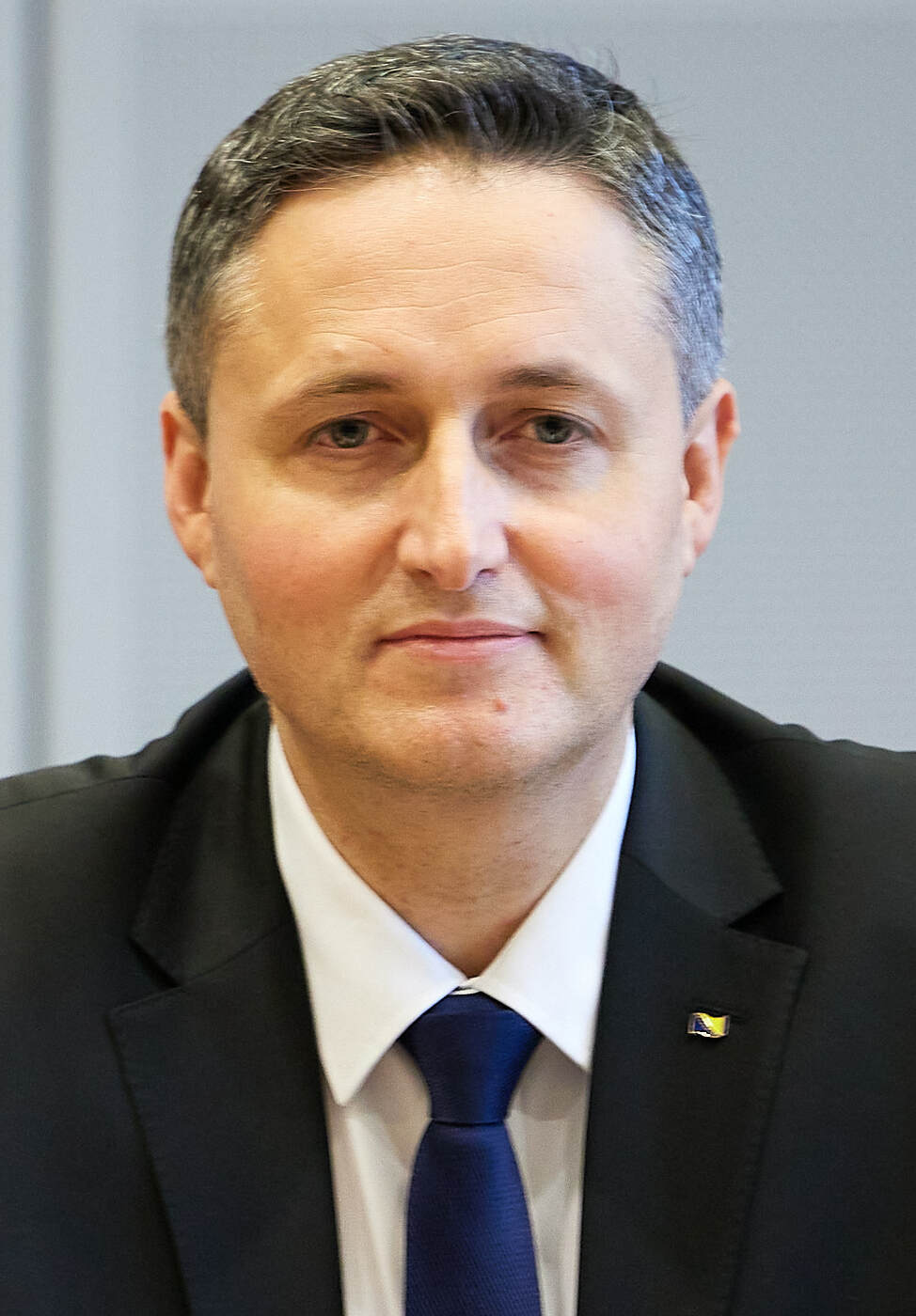

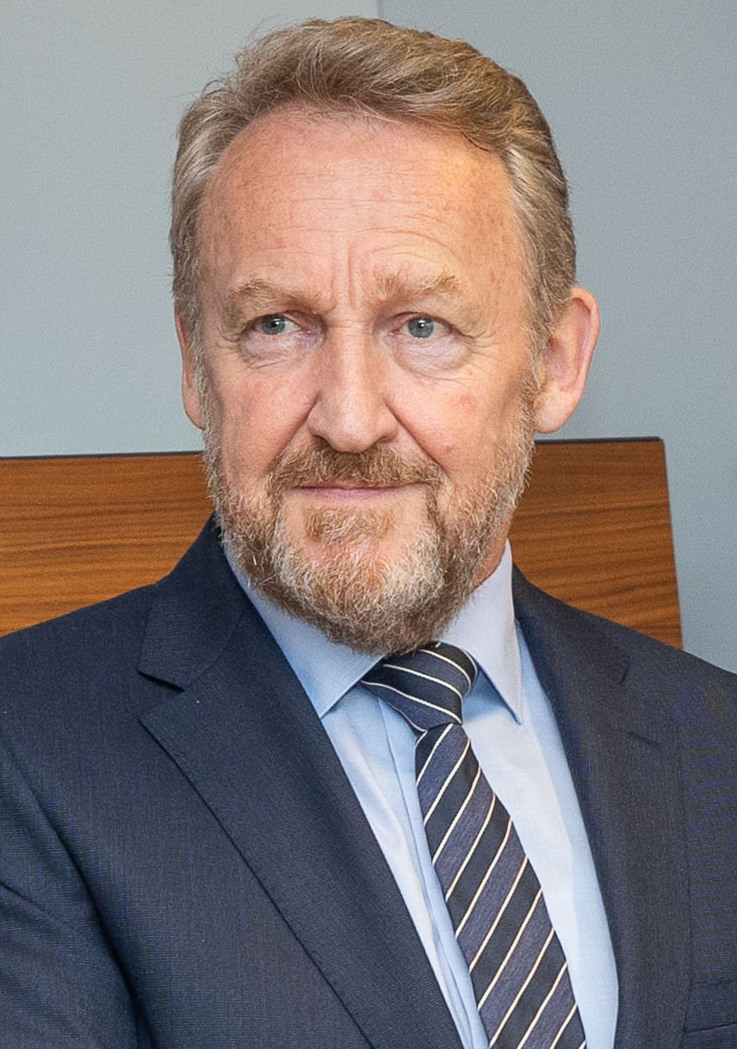
Candidate	Denis Bećirović	Bakir Izetbegović
Party	SDP BiH	SDA
Popular vote	330,238	214,412
Percentage	57.37%	37.25%
- Results by municipality for the Bosniak member of the Presidency
- Croat member of the presidency
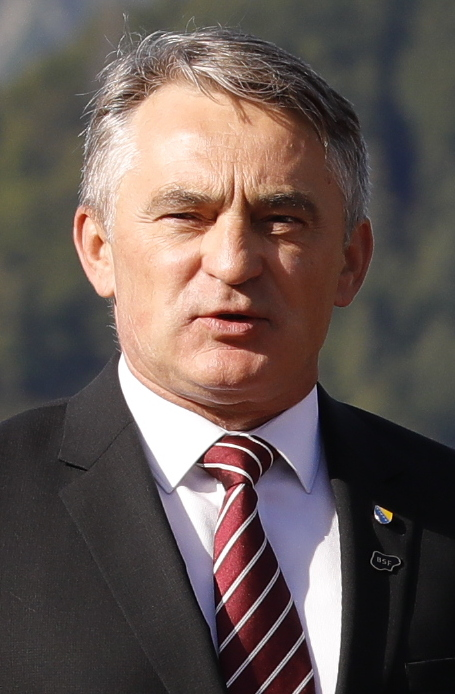

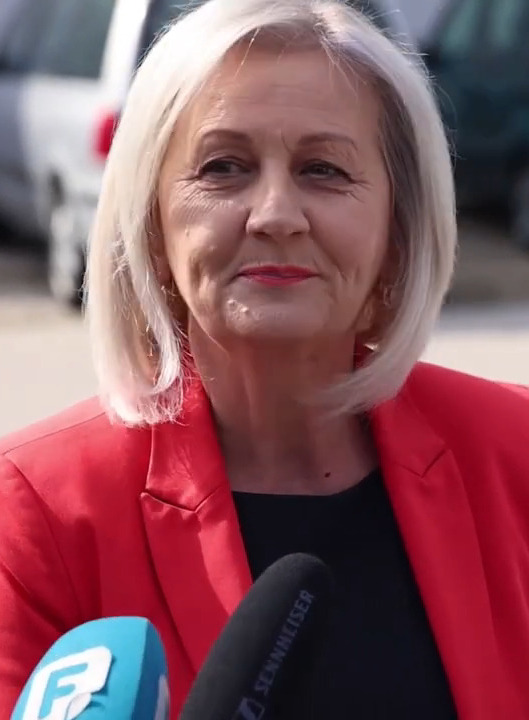
Candidate	Željko Komšić	Borjana Krišto
Party	DF	HDZ BiH
Popular vote	227,540	180,255
Percentage	55.80%	44.20%
- Results by municipality for the Croat member of the Presidency
- Serb member of the presidency
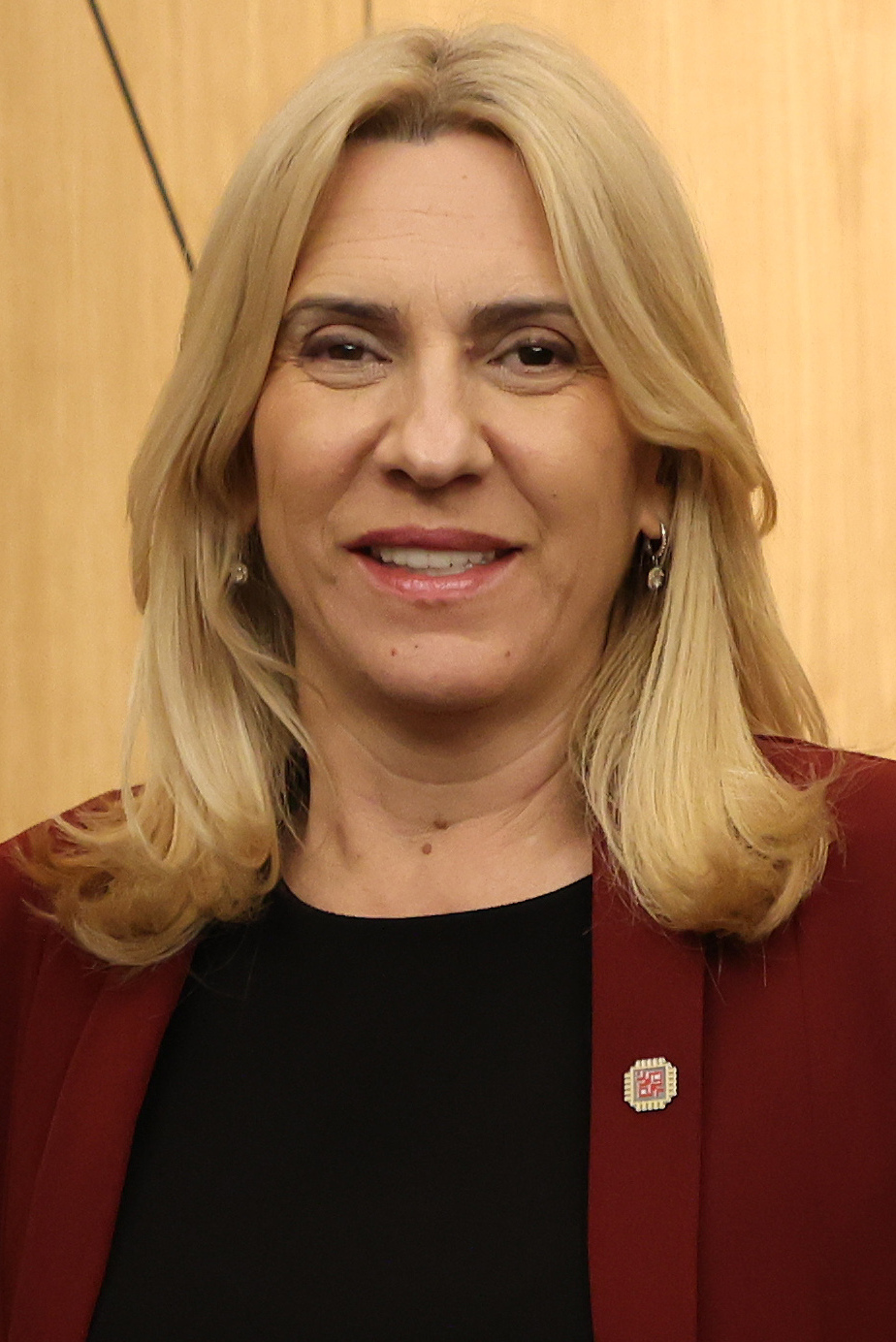

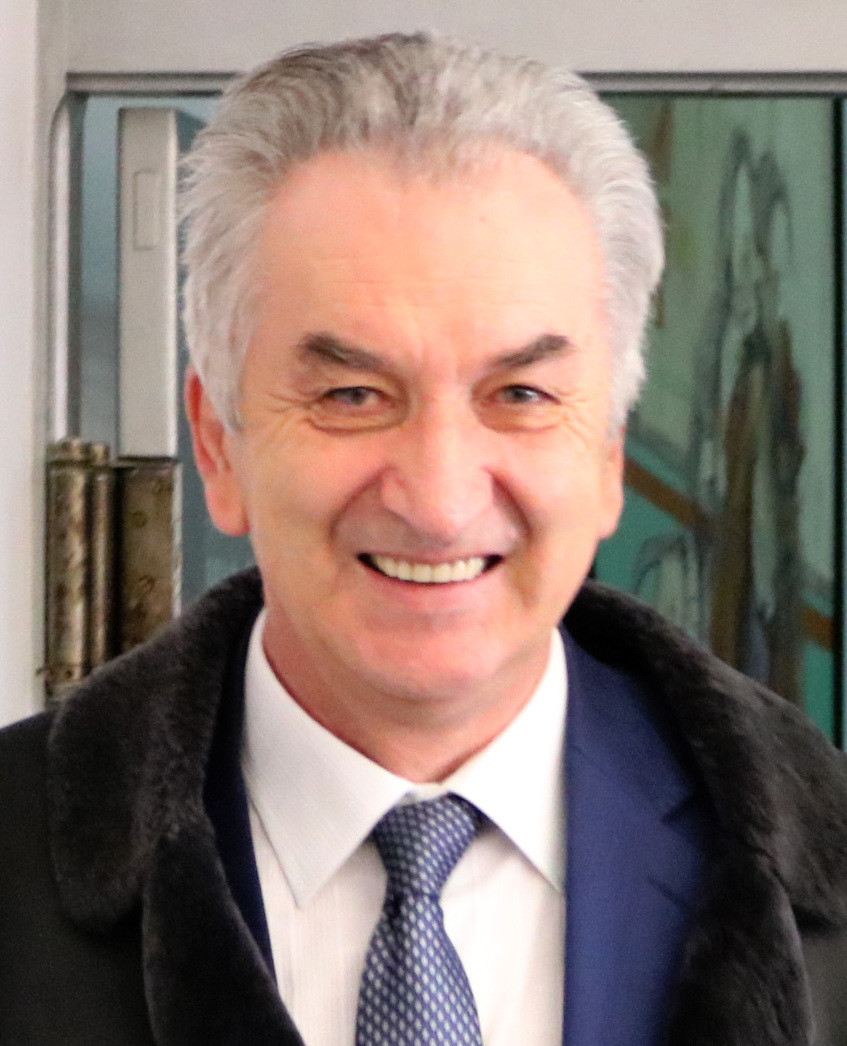
Candidate	Željka Cvijanović	Mirko Šarović
Party	SNSD	SDS
Popular vote	327,720	224,912
Percentage	51.65%	35.45%
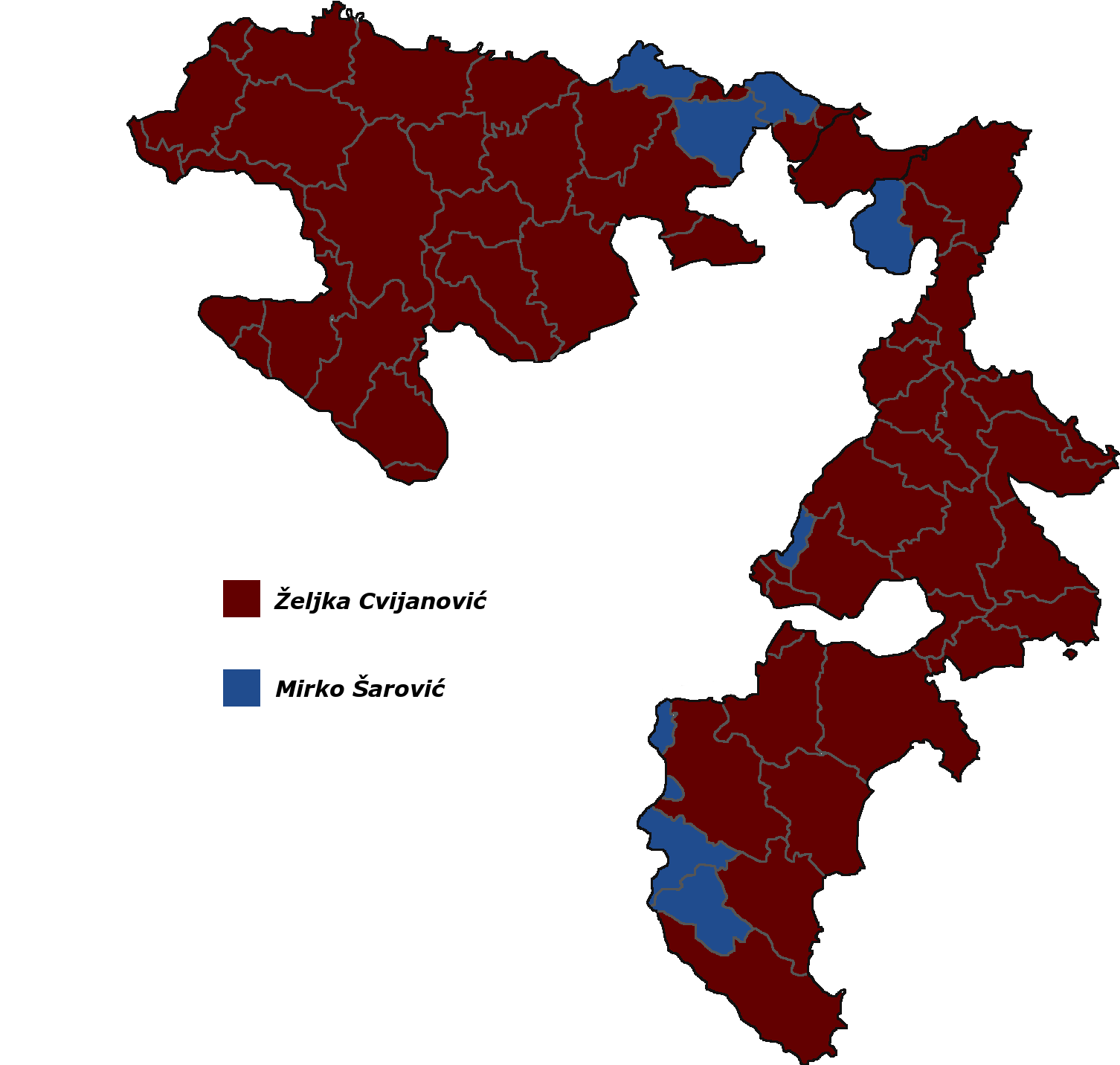
- Results by municipality for the Serb member of the Presidency
Presidency members before election
Šefik Džaferović (Bosniak)
Željko Komšić (Croat)
Milorad Dodik (Serb)
Elected Presidency members
Denis Bećirović (Bosniak)
Željko Komšić (Croat)
Željka Cvijanović (Serb)
- House of Representatives
- All 42 seats in the House of Representatives; 22 seats needed for a majority
Party	Leader	Vote %	Seats	+/–
SDA	Bakir Izetbegović	17.23	9	0
SNSD	Milorad Dodik	16.34	6	0
HDZ BiH	Dragan Čović	8.75	4	−1
SDP BiH	Nermin Nikšić	8.15	5	0
SDS	Mirko Šarović	7.07	2	−1
DF–GS	Željko Komšić	6.41	3	0
NiP	Elmedin Konaković	5.01	3	+3
PDP	Branislav Borenović	4.63	2	0
NS	Edin Forto	3.12	2	0
NES–ZNG	Nermin Ogrešević	2.97	2	+1
ZPR	Nebojša Vukanović	2.08	1	New
DEMOS	Nedeljko Čubrilović	1.93	1	New
US	Nenad Stevandić	1.55	1	New
BHI	Fuad Kasumović	1.28	1	New
This lists parties that won seats. See the complete results below.

Chairman before	Chairwoman after
Zoran Tegeltija; SNSD	Borjana Krišto; HDZ BiH

General elections were held in Bosnia and Herzegovina on 2 October 2022. They decided the makeup of the presidency as well as national, entity and cantonal governments.

Christian Schmidt, the High Representative for Bosnia and Herzegovina, imposed changes to the country's electoral law hours after voting ended for the election. The changes prominently included an expansion of the Federal House of Peoples from 56 to 80 members, changes in the election process for the house as well as changes in the election process for the president and vice presidents of the Federation of Bosnia and Herzegovina.

The elections for the House of Representatives were divided into two; one for the Federation of Bosnia and Herzegovina and one for Republika Srpska. In the presidential election, voters in the Federation elected Bosniak Denis Bećirović and re-elected Croat Željko Komšić, while voters in Republika Srpska elected Serb Željka Cvijanović. Komšić was re-elected to the Presidency for a record fourth term, while Cvijanović became the first woman to be elected to the Presidency as established after the Bosnian War.

Despite Denis Bećirović, who was a candidate of the Social Democratic Party (SDP BiH), beating the Party of Democratic Action (SDA) president Bakir Izetbegović for the Bosniak spot in the Presidency, the SDA repeated its result from the previous general election in 2018, emerging as the largest party in the House of Representatives, winning 9 of the 42 seats. The Alliance of Independent Social Democrats (SNSD) came in second with 6 seats, repeating its result from the previous election as well. The SDP BiH and the Croatian Democratic Union (HDZ BiH) came in third and fourth, winning 5 and 4 seats respectively. The Serb Democratic Party (SDS) won two seats, its lowest number ever, prompting SDS president Mirko Šarović to resign the following month.

In spite of the SDA emerging as the largest party, its failure to form a functional coalition led to the SNSD, the HDZ BiH and the liberal alliance Troika to form a coalition, with Borjana Krišto getting appointed as the new Chairwoman of the Council of Ministers in January 2023, becoming the first woman to serve as Bosnia and Herzegovina's head of government.

== Background ==
In the 2018 Bosnian general election, Šefik Džaferović of the Party of Democratic Action (SDA), Željko Komšić of the Democratic Front (DF) and Milorad Dodik of the Alliance of Independent Social Democrats (SNSD) were elected as the new Bosnian Presidency members, succeeding Bakir Izetbegović, Dragan Čović and Mladen Ivanić respectively. The SDA emerged as the largest party in the national House of Representatives, winning 9 of the 42 seats.

There was controversy over the election of the Croat member, as the non-nationalist candidate Željko Komšić won against the nationalist Dragan Čović (HDZ BiH) with the help of Bosniak voters, with Komšić winning first place almost exclusively in municipalities without a Croat relative majority. The result prompted protests of Croats accusing Bosniaks of out-voting and calling for the creation of their own entity or electoral constituency. In the following days, protests were held in the city of Mostar with signs "Not my president". In the days following the election, several municipalities with Croat majority declared Komšić persona non grata.

Following the 2018 election, the new Council of Ministers cabinet was confirmed by the House of Representatives after a one-year governmental formation crisis. The SNSD's Zoran Tegeltija was appointed Chairman of the Council of Ministers on 23 December 2019.

Tegeltija's Cabinet was supported by a coalition of the SNSD, the Croatian Democratic Union, the SDA, the DF and the Democratic People's Alliance. The major opposition was the coalition of the Social Democratic Party, Our Party and the People and Justice party, colloquially known as Troika. The coalition of the Serb Democratic Party (SDS) and the Party of Democratic Progress (PDP) was the major opposition in Republika Srpska.

In the Bosnian municipal elections that took place in November 2020, there were significant defeats for the ruling parties SDA and SNSD. The SDA lost, among other municipalities, Centar, Novo Sarajevo and Ilidža to Troika. The SNSD lost Banja Luka, to the liberal-conservative PDP and was also unable to assert itself against the moderately nationalist SDS in Bijeljina.

At a House of Representatives session held in January 2021, a vote of no confidence in Tegeltija took place, due to poor performance results during his term as Chairman of the Council of Ministers, but by the end of the voting, it was clear that Tegeltija was staying as Chairman of the Council of Ministers. Three months later, on 28 April, another vote of no confidence in Tegeltija took place at a House of Representatives session, but again, Tegeltija continued serving as Chairman.

== Electoral system ==
Official logo of the election

=== National elections ===
==== Presidency ====
The three members of the Presidency are elected by plurality. In Republika Srpska voters elect the Serb representative, whilst in the Federation of Bosnia and Herzegovina voters elect the Bosniak and Croat members. Voters registered in the Federation of Bosnia and Herzegovina can vote for either the Bosniak or Croat candidate, but cannot vote in both elections.

==== House of Representatives ====
The House of Representatives, the lower chamber of the Bosnian Parliament, has 42 members who are elected at entity level according to proportional representation. Voters in the Brčko District are free to vote for the Republika Srpska or Federal constituency. The Federation sends 28 representatives to parliament, while Republika Srpska send 14 of them. Of the 28 representatives of the Federation, 21 are elected in five multi-person constituencies (number of deputies 3-6), to ensure proportionality, seven compensatory mandates according to the Sainte-Laguë procedure. Of the 14 MPs of Republika Srpska, nine are elected in the constituencies (three MPs each) and five via entity-wide equalization mandates. There is a three percent threshold at the entity level.

=== Elections in Republika Srpska ===
==== Presidency ====
There is a list of candidates, whereby the candidate who gets the most votes (usually a Serb) is elected president; there is no runoff. The first-placed candidates from the other two ethnic groups (usually a Bosniak and a Croat) are elected as vice-presidents. The term of office of the President of Republika Srpska is four years with an option for one-time re-election. A renewed candidacy is possible again after a break of at least one term of office.

==== National Assembly ====
The single-chamber parliament of Republika Srpska, the National Assembly, is composed of 83 members elected by proportional representation. The election takes place in nine multi-person constituencies with entity-wide balancing mandates. Furthermore, at least four representatives should be represented in the National Assembly from each of the constitutive peoples. There is a three percent threshold.

=== Elections in the Federation of Bosnia and Herzegovina ===
==== Presidency ====
Unlike in Republika Srpska, the president of the Federation and the two vice-presidents are not elected by direct election: The upper chamber of the Federal Parliament, the House of Peoples, nominates candidates for the presidency and the vice-presidencies, followed by the lower chamber, the House of Representatives, must confirm this nomination by election. Subsequently, confirmation by the majority of the delegates of all three constitutive ethnic groups in the House of Peoples is required.

==== House of Representatives ====
The House of Representatives of the Federation of Bosnia and Herzegovina has a total of 98 members who are elected by proportional representation. The election takes place in 12 multi-person constituencies with entity-wide balancing mandates. In the Federal House of Representatives, each constitutive ethnic group should be represented by at least four members. The threshold is three percent.

==== Cantonal Assemblies ====
The assemblies of the 10 cantons of the Federation are also elected. The election is based on proportional representation with a threshold of three percent. The individual cantonal assemblies send members to the House of Peoples.

== Presidency candidates ==
=== Declared candidates ===
The following were the official candidates who ran for Presidency member.

==== Bosniak member election ====
Candidate	Affiliation	Background	Reference
Bakir Izetbegović	Party of Democratic Action	Member of the Presidency (2010–2018); President of the Party of Democratic Action (2014–present)	
Mirsad Hadžikadić	Platform for Progress	Director of the Institute of Complex Systems at the University of North Carolina at Charlotte	
Denis Bećirović	Social Democratic Party	Vice-president of the Social Democratic Party (2009–2025); Member of the House of Peoples (2019–2022)	

==== Croat member election ====
Candidate	Affiliation	Background	Reference
Željko Komšić	Democratic Front	Member of the Presidency (2018–present; 2006–2014); President of the Democratic Front (2013–present)	
Borjana Krišto	Croatian Democratic Union	President of the Federation of Bosnia and Herzegovina (2007–2011); Member of the House of Representatives (2014–2022)	

==== Serb member election ====
Candidate	Affiliation	Background	Reference
Željka Cvijanović	Alliance of Independent Social Democrats	President of Republika Srpska (2018–2022); Prime Minister of Republika Srpska (2013–2018)	
Nenad Nešić	Democratic People's Alliance	Member of the House of Representatives (2018–2022); President of the Democratic People's Alliance (2020–present)	
Vojin Mijatović	Social Democratic Party	Vice-president of the Social Democratic Party	
Mirko Šarović	Serb Democratic Party	Member of the Presidency (2002–2003); President of Republika Srpska (2000–2002); President of the Serb Democratic Party (2019–2022)	
Borislav Bijelić	Life Party		

=== Declined to be candidates ===
The individuals in this section were the subject of speculation about their possible candidacy, but publicly denied interest in running.

- Fahrudin Radončić, president of the Union for a Better Future (2009–present)
- Šefik Džaferović, former Presidency member (2018–2022)
- Haris Silajdžić, founder of the Party for Bosnia and Herzegovina; former Presidency member (2006–2010); former Prime Minister of the Republic of Bosnia and Herzegovina (1993–1996)

== Opinion polling ==
=== Presidency ===
Three members are elected to the presidency, two from the Federation of Bosnia and Herzegovina and one from Republika Srpska.

==== Federation of Bosnia and Herzegovina ====
Publication date	Pollster	Votes						Others	Undecided
Publication date	Pollster	Votes	Izetbegović SDA	Hadžikadić PzP	Bećirović SDP BiH	Komšić DF	Krišto HDZ BiH	Others	Undecided
2 Oct 2022	2022 general election	983,413	37.2%	5.4%	57.4%	55.8%	44.2%	–	–
13–17 Sep 2022	Depo	6,952	16.3%	5.8%	40.7%	15.7%	5.8%	–	15.6%
16 Sep 2022	The Bosnia Times	–	24.0%	3.0%	37.0%	19.0%	17.0%	–	–
7 Sep 2022	Klix	34,837	24.0%	6.1%	42.2%	21.2%	6.5%	–	–
15 Jul 2022	Ipsos	1,000	16.0%	–	17.0%	12.0%	16.0%	–	–
5 Jul 2022	Klix	48,043	26.7%	4.1%	40.7%	17.2%	5.8%	5.5%	–

==== Republika Srpska ====
Publication date	Pollster	Votes				Others	Undecided
Publication date	Pollster	Votes	Cvijanović SNSD	Nešić DNS	Šarović SDS	Others	Undecided
2 Oct 2022	2022 general election	634,520	51.6%	5.5%	35.5%	7.4%	–
11–17 Sep 2022	Metrics	1,558	42.0%	11.0%	22.0%	3.0%	22.0%
5–15 Sep 2022	Faktor plus	3,000	35.7%	3.3%	29.8%	13.3%	17.9%
7 Sep 2022	Klix	18,042	10.1%	4.6%	20.2%	3.9%	61.2%
15–30 Aug 2022	Metrics	1,708	32.1%	5.2%	12.8%	1.8%	47.9%
15 Jul 2022	Ipsos	1,000	29.0%	–	17.0%	–	–
5 Jul 2022	Klix	21,966	10.9%	4.9%	20.3%	–	63.9%

=== House of Representatives ===
The elections for the House of Representatives are divided into two; one for the Federation of Bosnia and Herzegovina and one for Republika Srpska.

Publication date	Pollster	Votes										
Publication date	Pollster	Votes	SDA	SNSD	SDP BiH	HDZ BiH	DF	PDP	SBB	Others	Undecided	Lead
2 Oct 2022	2022 general election	1,733,280	17.2%	16.3%	8.1%	8.7%	6.4%	4.6%	1.6%	37.1%	–	0.9
15 Jul 2022	Ipsos	1,000	14.0%	10.0%	7.0%	10.0%	2.0%	5.0%	1.0%	–	–	4.0

== Results ==
=== Presidency ===
The elected members of the national Presidency were Denis Bećirović (Bosniak, SDP BiH), Željko Komšić (Croat, DF) and Željka Cvijanović (Serb, SNSD).

Candidate	Party	Votes	%
Bosniak member
Denis Bećirović	Social Democratic Party	330,238	57.37
Bakir Izetbegović	Party of Democratic Action	214,412	37.25
Mirsad Hadžikadić	Platform for Progress	30,968	5.38
Total		575,618	100.00
Croat member
Željko Komšić	Democratic Front	227,540	55.80
Borjana Krišto	Croatian Democratic Union	180,255	44.20
Total		407,795	100.00
Serb member
Željka Cvijanović	Alliance of Independent Social Democrats	327,720	51.65
Mirko Šarović	Serb Democratic Party	224,912	35.45
Vojin Mijatović	Social Democratic Party	38,655	6.09
Nenad Nešić	Democratic People's Alliance	34,955	5.51
Borislav Bijelić	Life Party	8,278	1.30
Total		634,520	100.00
Valid votes		1,617,933	93.35
Invalid votes		46,902	2.71
Blank votes		68,371	3.94
Total votes		1,733,206	100.00
Registered voters/turnout		3,368,666	51.45
Source: Centralna izborna komisija BiH OSCE

=== House of Representatives ===
Party	Votes	%	Seats	+/–
Party of Democratic Action	273,545	17.23	9	0
Alliance of Independent Social Democrats	259,521	16.34	6	0
Croatian Democratic Union	139,018	8.75	4	–1
Social Democratic Party	129,499	8.15	5	0
Serb Democratic Party	112,250	7.07	2	–1
Democratic Front–Civic Alliance	101,713	6.41	3	0
People and Justice	79,555	5.01	3	+3
Party of Democratic Progress	73,489	4.63	2	0
Our Party	49,481	3.12	2	0
People's European Union–For New Generations	47,157	2.97	2	+1
For Justice and Order	32,982	2.08	1	New
Democratic Union	30,591	1.93	1	New
Party for Bosnia and Herzegovina	26,480	1.67	0	0
HDZ 1990–Croatian National Shift	25,691	1.62	0	0
Platform for Progress–Independent Bloc	25,007	1.57	0	–1
Union for a Better Future	24,786	1.56	0	–2
United Srpska	24,687	1.55	1	+1
Socialist Party	23,018	1.45	0	–1
Democratic People's Alliance	21,832	1.37	0	–1
Bosnian-Herzegovinian Initiative	20,259	1.28	1	New
Bosnian Party	17,721	1.12	0	0
Movement of Democratic Action	14,889	0.94	0	–1
Social Democrats	11,831	0.75	0	New
Croatian Republican Party	11,231	0.71	0	New
Labour Party	3,727	0.23	0	0
Bosnian-Herzegovinian Greens	3,394	0.21	0	New
Life Party	1,840	0.12	0	New
Union for New Politics	706	0.04	0	0
The Left Wing	545	0.03	0	New
Very Small Party	530	0.03	0	New
Re-Balance	503	0.03	0	New
Circle	363	0.02	0	New
Bosnian-Herzegovinian Patriotic Party	158	0.01	0	0
Total	1,587,999	100.00	42	–
Valid votes	1,587,999	91.62		
Invalid votes	57,325	3.31		
Blank votes	87,956	5.07		
Total votes	1,733,280	100.00		
Registered voters/turnout	3,368,666	51.45		
Source: Centralna izborna komisija BiH OSCE

=== By entity ===
Party	Federation		Republika Srpska	
Party	Votes	%	Votes	%
Party of Democratic Action	243,413	25.17	30,132	4.85
Alliance of Independent Social Democrats	4,006	0.41	255,515	41.15
Croatian Democratic Union	137,340	14.20	1,678	0.27
Social Democratic Party	129,499	13.39		
Serb Democratic Party			112,250	18.08
Democratic Front–Civic Alliance	101,713	10.52		
People and Justice	79,555	8.23		
Party of Democratic Progress	466	0.05	73,023	11.76
Our Party	49,481	5.12		
People's European Union–For New Generations	47,157	4.88		
For Justice and Order			32,982	5.31
Democratic Union			30,591	4.93
Party for Bosnia and Herzegovina	26,480	2.74		
HDZ 1990–Croatian National Shift	25,246	2.61	445	0.07
Platform for Progress–Independent Bloc	19,823	2.05	5,184	0.83
Union for a Better Future	23,101	2.39	1,685	0.27
United Srpska	374	0.04	24,313	3.92
Socialist Party			23,018	3.71
Democratic People's Alliance	188	0.02	21,644	3.49
Bosnian-Herzegovinian Initiative	18,697	1.93	1,562	0.25
Bosnian Party	17,721	1.83		
Movement of Democratic Action	14,889	1.54		
Social Democrats	9,928	1.03	1,903	0.31
Croatian Republican Party	11,231	1.16		
Labour Party	3,727	0.39		
Bosnian-Herzegovinian Greens	1,765	0.18	1,629	0.26
Life Party			1,840	0.30
Union for New Politics	403	0.04	303	0.05
The Left Wing	171	0.02	374	0.06
Very Small Party	224	0.02	306	0.05
Re-Balance	163	0.02	340	0.05
Circle	104	0.01	259	0.04
Bosnian-Herzegovinian Patriotic Party	158	0.02		
Total	967,023	100.00	620,976	100.00
Valid votes	967,023	91.56	620,976	91.71
Invalid/blank votes	89,142	8.44	56,119	8.29
Total votes	1,056,165	100.00	677,095	100.00
Registered voters/turnout	2,109,344	50.07	1,259,322	53.77

=== By electoral unit ===
==== Federation of Bosnia and Herzegovina ====
Electoral Unit	SDA	HDZ BiH	SDP BiH	DF–GS	NiP	NS	NES–ZNG	BHI	Turnout
1st	25.82	7.44	10.70	10.42	2.94	2.21	18.35	0.07	38.99
2nd	13.52	49.70	8.32	4.19	1.94	0.77	2.69	0.03	55.94
3rd	20.69	0.81	12.38	10.76	21.71	14.77	6.37	0.06	54.76
4th	32.48	16.01	12.85	11.71	5.63	2.07	2.74	6.99	51.44
5th	28.24	6.46	19.50	12.92	4.26	3.13	0.73	0.08	48.45
Total	25.17	14.20	13.39	10.52	8.23	5.12	4.88	1.93	50.07
Source: izbori.ba

==== Republika Srpska ====
Electoral Unit	SNSD	SDS	PDP	ZPR	DEMOS	SDA	US	Turnout
1st	42.65	12.99	18.99	5.67	2.63	3.42	4.21	52.85
2nd	37.90	23.56	7.96	3.81	8.31	5.42	2.19	49.88
3rd	42.15	20.61	3.83	6.35	5.09	6.63	5.30	60.72
Total	41.15	18.08	11.76	5.31	4.93	4.85	3.92	53.77
Source: izbori.ba

== Aftermath ==
=== Allegations of voter fraud ===
Following the release of the preliminary results in the Republika Srpska entity elections, opposition parties filed accusations of electoral fraud directly against the leading candidate Milorad Dodik, who they claimed had coordinated stuffing ballot boxes with thousands of illegal votes to put the Alliance of Independent Social Democrats ahead in the polls and that Jelena Trivić of the Party of Democratic Progress was the true winner of the Republika Srpska presidential election. As a result of the allegations, the Central Election Commission began a recount of the ballots. When the Election Commission verified the preliminary results, they did not verify the Republika Srpska elections. However on 27 October, officials confirmed Dodik's victory. The commission noted that while there were irregularities, none were on a level that would have changed the outcome of the election.

=== Government formation ===
On 15 December 2022, a coalition led by the Alliance of Independent Social Democrats, the Croatian Democratic Union (HDZ BiH) and the liberal alliance Troika reached an agreement on the formation of a new government for the 2022–2026 parliamentary term, designating HDZ BiH deputy president Borjana Krišto as the new chairwoman of the Council of Ministers. The Presidency officially nominated Krišto as chairwoman-designate on 22 December. The national House of Representatives confirmed her appointment on 28 December. On 25 January 2023, the House of Representatives confirmed the appointment of Krišto's cabinet.

== See also ==
- 2022 Federation of Bosnia and Herzegovina general election
- 2022 Republika Srpska general election
