= Platform for Progress =

Political party in Bosnia and Herzegovina

Platform for Progress Platforma za progres
- President: Mirsad Hadžikadić
- Founded: 25 November 2018
- Headquarters: Sarajevo
- Ideology: Pro-Europeanism; Atlanticism; Civic nationalism
- Political position: Centre
- HoR BiH: 0 / 42
- HoP BiH: 0 / 15
- HoR FBiH: 0 / 98
- HoP FBiH: 0 / 80
- NA RS: 0 / 83

Website
- www.platformazaprogres.ba

The Platform for Progress (Bosnian: Platforma za progres, abbreviated PzP) is a centrist political party in Bosnia and Herzegovina, founded on 25 November 2018. At the party's founding convention, the 1,200 delegates chose Mirsad Hadžikadić as president of the party and Aleksandar Eskić as vice president.

== History ==
=== 2020 municipal elections ===
The party has supported electronic voting, similar to the system used in Estonia. The party organized several protests in 2020. On 16 May 2020, it organized protests in Mostar, rallying in support of elections which had not been held in the city since 2008. The party held similar protests in Tuzla and Sarajevo, in which they called for the 2020 Bosnian municipal elections to be held no later than 15 November.

=== 2022 general election ===
The Platform for Progress announced its president, Mirsad Hadžikadić's, candidacy in the Bosnian general election on 9 December 2021, running for Bosnian Presidency member and representing the Bosniaks.

== List of presidents ==
#	Name (Born–Died)	Portrait	Term of Office	
1	Mirsad Hadžikadić (b. 1955)		25 November 2018	present

== Elections ==
=== Parliamentary elections ===
Parliamentary Assembly of Bosnia and Herzegovina
Year	#	Popular vote	%	HoR	Seat change	HoP	Seat change	Government
2022 (Note: Run in coalition with NB.)	15th	25,007	1.57	0 / 42	New	0 / 15	New	Extra-parliamentary

=== Presidency elections ===
Presidency of Bosnia and Herzegovina
Election year	#	Candidate	Votes	%	Representing	Elected?
2018	4th	Mirsad Hadžikadić	58,555	10.09%	Bosniaks	No
2022	3rd	Mirsad Hadžikadić	30,968	5.38%	Bosniaks	No
