= Herzegovina-Neretva Canton =

Canton in Bosnia and Herzegovina

Coordinates: 43°27′N 17°49′E

Herzegovina-Neretva Canton Hercegovačko-neretvanski kanton Херцеговачко-неретвански кантон Hercegovačko-neretvanska županija
- Flag Coat of arms

- Status: Canton of the Federation of Bosnia and Herzegovina
- Capital and largest city: Mostar
- Official languages: Croatian and Bosnian
- Ethnic groups (2013): 53.29% Croats 41.44% Bosniaks 2.90% Serbs 2.37% others
- Government: Parliamentary system
  - Prime Minister: Marija Buhač (HDZ BiH)
  - President of Assembly: Džafer Alić (SDA)
- Legislature: Assembly of the Herzegovina-Neretva County

Canton of the Federation of Bosnia and Herzegovina
  - Establishment: 12 June 1996

Area
  - Total: 4,401 km^{2} (1,699 sq mi)

Population
  - 2013 census: 222,007
  - Density: 53.69/km^{2} (139.1/sq mi)
- HDI (2023): ▲0.827 very high
- Currency: BAM
- Time zone: UTC+1 (CET)
  - Summer (DST): UTC+2 (CEST)
- Date format: dd-mm-yyyy
- Website http://www.vlada-hnz-k.ba/bs/naslovnica

The Herzegovina-Neretva Canton (Croatian: Hercegovačko-neretvanska županija; Bosnian: Hercegovačko-neretvanski kanton; Serbian: Херцеговачко-неретвански кантон, romanized: Hercegovačko-neretvanski kanton) is a federated state and one of ten cantons of the Federation of Bosnia and Herzegovina in Bosnia and Herzegovina.

The canton mainly comprises the Neretva river valley area and parts of Herzegovina west of Mostar, its administrative centre. It is one of the cantons considered to have a mixed population.

== History ==
Before the war in Bosnia and Herzegovina, the present-day municipalities of East Mostar and Berkovići were part of the municipality of Mostar, while Ivanica was part of the municipality of Trebinje. The history of today's Herzegovina-Neretva Canton began on 18 March 1994, with the signing of the Washington Agreement. The canton was officially constituted on 23 December 1996 as one of the ten cantons of the Federation of Bosnia and Herzegovina.

== Geography ==
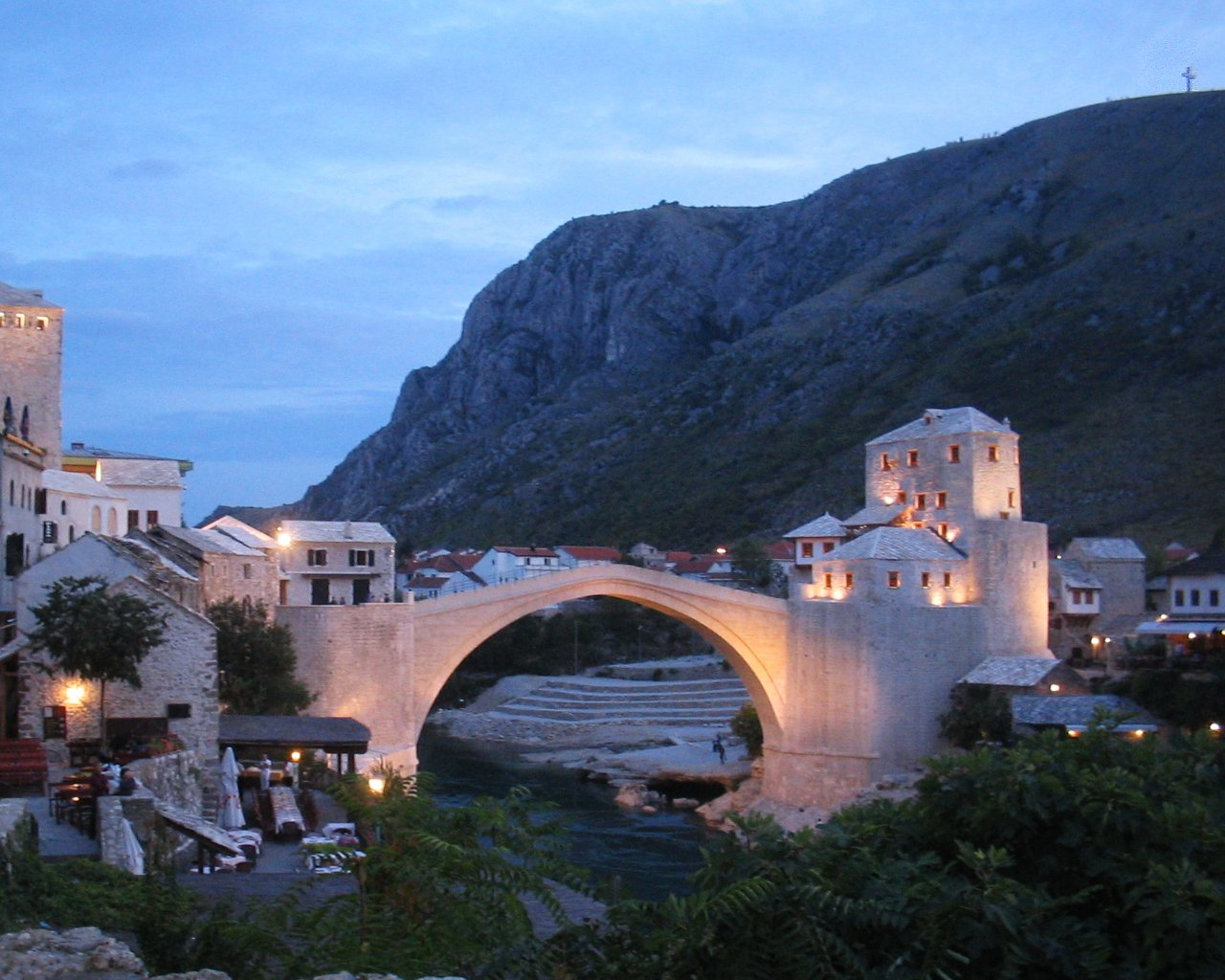
Stari Most, Mostar

The canton is the only canton in Bosnia and Herzegovina with access to the sea via the municipality of Neum, a town of 4,653 citizens (per the 2013 census) and the area around the city is rich with historical and archeological remains of the Illyrians, a people who lived in the Balkans thousands of years ago.

The largest city in the canton and the fifth largest city in the country is Mostar, located on the banks of the Neretva river and is divided between Croats and Bosniaks. Mostar is known for its old bridge, Stari Most, which was constructed by the area's Ottoman rulers, who also brought Islam to the region. Bosnian Croat forces bombed and destroyed the bridge on November 8, 1993. Upon its destruction, it had stood for 427 years and had become a symbol of a shared cultural heritage and "peaceful" co-existence. The bridge was reconstructed in the summer of 2004. The opening ceremony was attended by several foreign delegates including Stjepan Mesić, the President of Croatia. Other notable cities in this canton are Čapljina, Konjic, Jablanica and Međugorje, the most significant Marian shrine in the region. Jablanica and Konjic are notable for battles which took place there during World War II and there is a large museum in Jablanica dedicated to these battles.

The Neretva river runs through the cities of Konjic, Jablanica, Mostar, and Čapljina before it flows through Croatia and into the Adriatic Sea. There are large lakes in the canton, such as the Jablanica lake located around the city Jablanica. The southernmost municipality in the canton is the Neum municipality which borders the Adriatic sea and the easternmost municipality is the Ravno municipality along the border with Croatia.

=== Municipalities ===
The canton is split into the municipalities of

- Čapljina
- Čitluk
- Jablanica
- Konjic
- Mostar
- Neum
- Prozor-Rama
- Ravno
- Stolac

== Demographics ==
Ethnic groups of Herzegovina-Neretva (2013 census)
1. Croats (53.3%)
2. Bosniaks (41.4%)
3. Serbs (2.90%)
4. Other groups (2.37%)

Of the ten cantons comprising the Federation of Bosnia and Herzegovina, Herzegovina-Neretva Canton is one of two cantons, the other being the Central Bosnia Canton, nearly equally populated by Bosniaks and Croats. In these cantons, special legislative procedures protect the constituent ethnic groups.

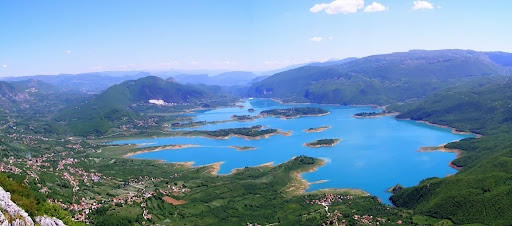
Rama lake

Croats form a majority in the municipalities of Čapljina, Čitluk, Neum, Prozor-Rama and Ravno, and a relative majority in Stolac and Mostar according to the 2013 census. Bosniaks form an absolute majority in the municipalities of Jablanica and Konjic.

=== 2013 Census ===
Municipality	Croats	%	Serbs	%	Bosniaks	%	Total
Čapljina	20,538	78.51	714	2.72	4,541	17.36	26,157
Čitluk	17,900	98.67	18	0.09	29	0.15	18,140
Jablanica	726	7.18	63	0.62	9,045	89.45	10,111
Konjic	1,553	6.17	355	1.41	22,486	89.41	25,148
Mostar	51,216	48.40	4,421	4.17	46,752	44.19	113,169
Neum	4,543	97.63	21	0.45	63	1.35	4,653
Prozor-Rama	10,702	74.94	3	0.02	3,525	24.69	14,280
Ravno	2,633	81.79	558	17.33	20	0.62	3,219
Stolac	8,486	58.51	279	1.92	5,544	38.22	14,502
Canton	118,297	53.29	6,432	2.90	92,005	41.44	222,007

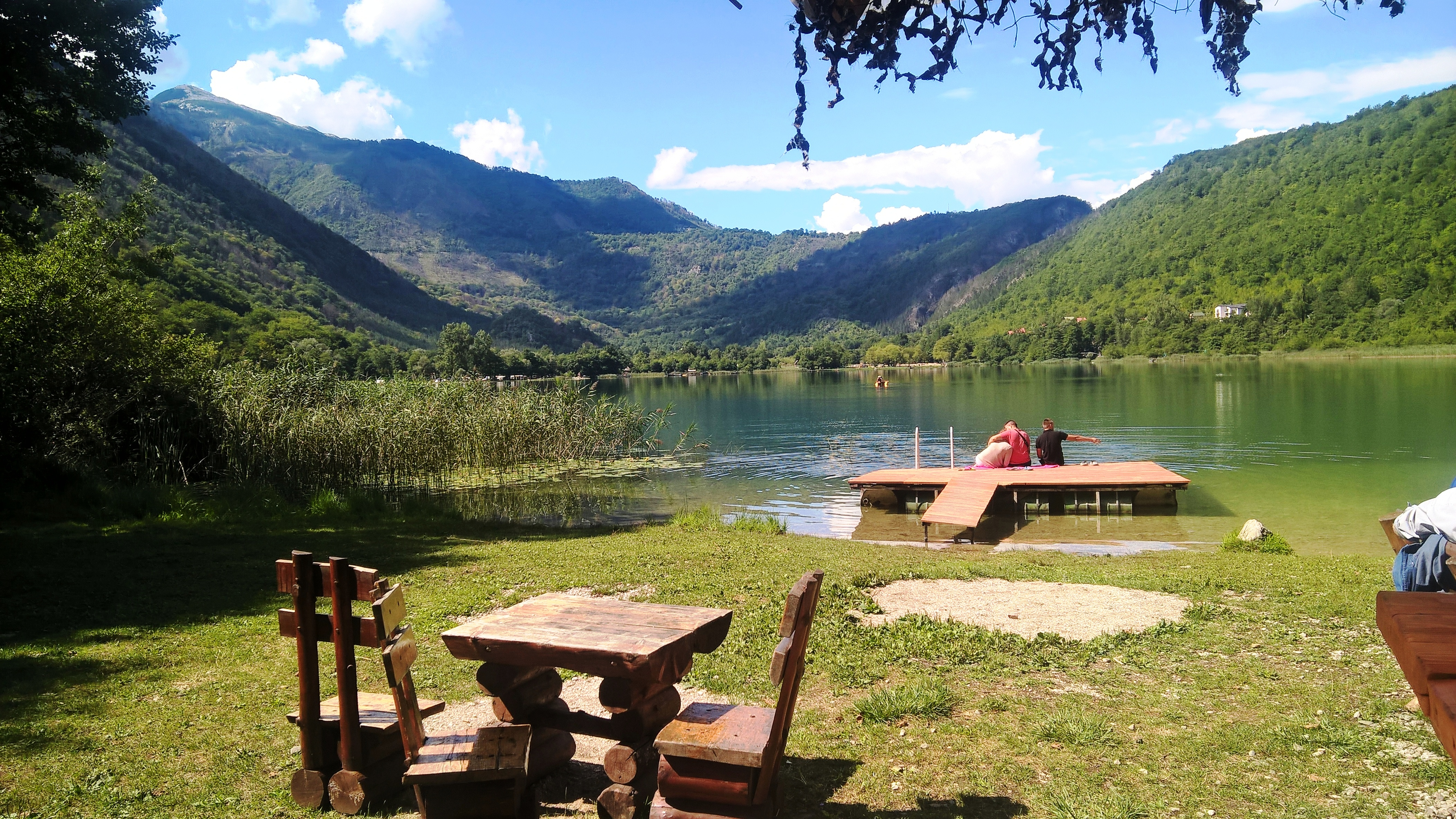
Konjic Municipality

== Politics and government ==
According to the current law, the Herzegovina-Neretva Canton is one of the ten cantons of the Federation of Bosnia and Herzegovina, which is one of the two entities of Bosnia and Herzegovina.

The Herzegovina-Neretva Canton has its own legislative, executive and judicial powers. Like each of the cantons of FBiH, it has its own constitution, assembly, government, symbols and has a number of exclusive competences (police, education, use of natural resources, spatial and housing policy, culture), while some competences are divided. between cantonal and federal authorities (health, social protection, transport).

At the local level, citizens of Herzegovina-Neretva Canton vote every four years in municipal elections for local government in four cities and five other municipalities.

On September 5, 2025, the President of the Government of the Herzegovina-Neretva County, Marija Buhač, and the prefect of the Varaždin County, Anđelko Stričak, signed an agreement on cooperation between the two counties in the areas of economy, education, agriculture, tourism, culture, sports and youth.

=== Legislative branch ===
The citizens of the canton of Herzegovina-Neretva vote for a total of 30 representatives in the Assembly of the Herzegovina-Neretva Canton every four years in general elections.

The current composition of the Assembly of the Herzegovina-Neretva Canton is:

Groups	Members per group
HDZ BiH–HKDU–HDU–HRAST	13 / 30
SDA	8 / 30
SDP BiH	3 / 30
HDZ 1990–HSS BiH	2 / 30
HRS	2 / 30
NES–PDA–NPD	1 / 30
DF–GS	1 / 30

=== Executive branch ===
The executive branch is the Government of the Herzegovina-Neretva Canton. A two thirds majority (20 seats) in the Assembly is required to appoint a government.

Based on the results of the 2022 parliamentary election, the current HNK government is formed by a coalition between the Croatian Democratic Union (HDZ BiH), the Party of Democratic Action (SDA) and the Social Democratic Party (SDP BiH).

The current HNK government consists of the following ministries:

Ministry	Minister	Took office	Party
Prime Minister	Marija Buhač	9 November 2023	HDZ BiH
Ministry of Finance	Adil Šuta	9 November 2023	SDA
Ministry of Economy	Zanin Vejzović	9 November 2023	SDP BiH
Ministry of Commerce, Tourism and Environmental Protection	Emil Balavac	9 November 2023	SDP BiH
Ministry of Construction and Spatial Planning	Bekir Isaković	9 November 2023	SDA
Ministry of Agriculture, Forestry and Water Management	Mario Jurica	9 November 2023	HDZ BiH
Ministry of Justice, Administration and Local Self-Government	Goran Karanović	9 November 2023	Independent^{(SDP BiH and SDA)}
Ministry of Transport and Communications	Ivo Bevanda	9 November 2023	HDZ BiH
Ministry of Education, Science, Culture and Sports	Adnan Velagić	9 November 2023	SDA
Ministry of the Interior	Marijo Marić	9 November 2023	HDZ BiH
Ministry for Issues of Combatants	Đuro Prkačin	9 November 2023	HDZ BiH
Ministry of Health, Labour and Social Policy	Milenko Bevanda	9 November 2023	HDZ BiH

== Economy ==
The strongest industries by number of employees in Herzegovina-Neretva Canton (as of August 2017) are wholesale and retail trade, manufacturing, and hotels and restaurants. The economic headquarters of the canton is its capital, Mostar.

=== Industry ===
After the tertiary sector, the manufacturing sector is the strongest sector of the economy of the Herzegovina-Neretva Canton. The strongest branches of this sector are the processing industry and electricity production.

The manufacturing industry has a total of 6,798 employees (August 2017). The strongest industries are military (e.g. Igman in Konjic), metal processing industry (e.g. Aluminij in Mostar) and food industry (e.g. Hepok in Mostar).

Electricity generation is also an important industry, this is carried out in the mainly in hydroelectric power plants on the Neretva River and its tributaries, which are mostly owned by Elektroprivreda HZHB (most of the electricity produced comes from these hydroelectric power plants).

=== Tourism ===
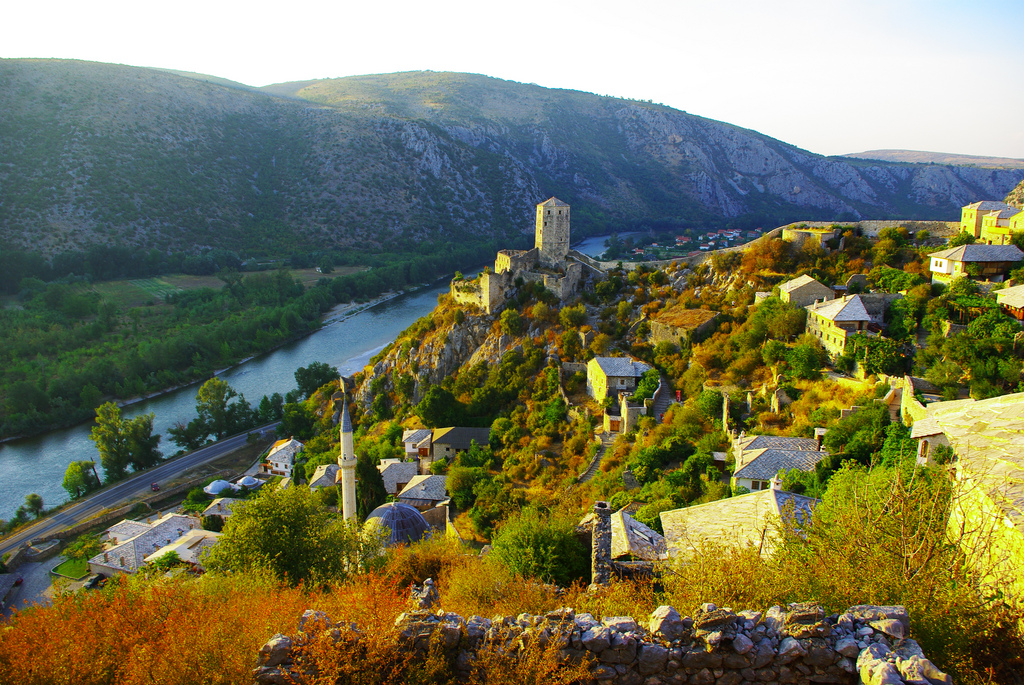
Počitelj, Municipality of Čapljina

The canton of Herzegovina-Neretva, with its nature parks and numerous natural beauties, has great tourism potential. According to the Federal Statistical Office, in 2014 the canton was visited by 104,006 foreign tourists and 208,647 overnight stays were made. The biggest tourist attractions in the region are the old town of Mostar, Blagaj near Mostar, Medjugorje and Neum (Bosnia and Herzegovina's only outlet to the Adriatic Sea).

== Transportation ==
=== Roads ===
The following main roads and highways pass through the canton of Herzegovina-Neretva:

- From west to east: Main road M2 (Klek-Zaton Doli), M6 (Grude-Trebinje) and M6.1 (Resanovci-Gacko).
- From south to north: highway A1 (Svilaj-Bijača), main road M17 (Bosanski Šamac-Čapljina) and M17.3 (Čapljina-Neum).

The total length of roads in the canton of Herzegovina-Neretva is 362.68 kilometers.

=== Railroad ===
The Ploče-Sarajevo railroad passes through the Herzegovina-Neretva Canton, to which Konjic, Mostar, Jablanica and Čapljina are connected. The length of the railroad in the region is 126.2 kilometers, while the total number of railway stations and stops is 28, three of which are connected to the high-speed rail network.

=== Air traffic ===
Mostar International Airport (OMO) is the third busiest airport in Bosnia and Herzegovina after Sarajevo and Tuzla airports, with a total of 53,618 passengers (2016).

== Education ==
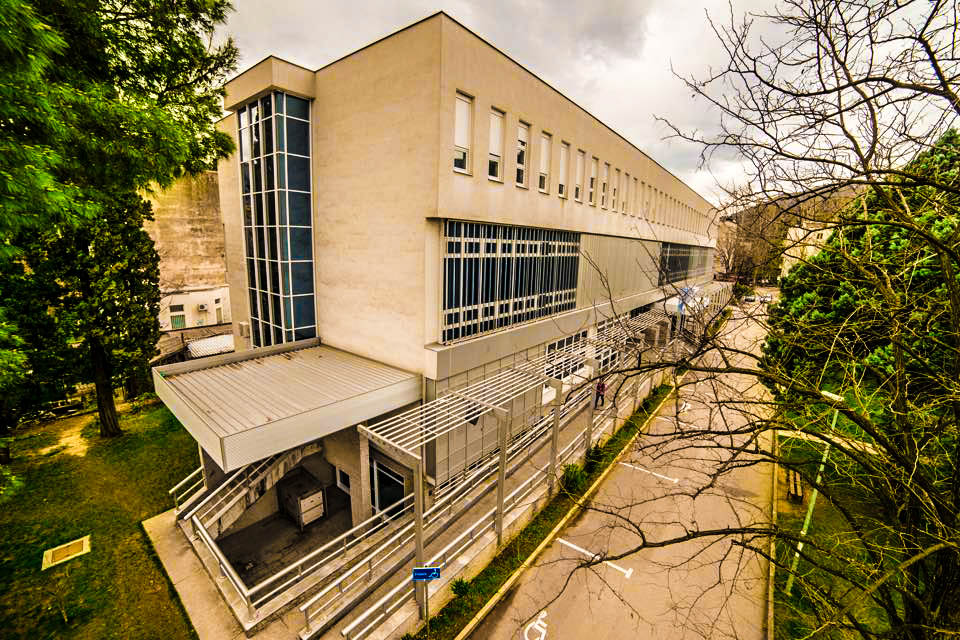
Faculty of Humanities, University of Mostar

There are a total of 33 secondary schools (28 state and five private) and numerous elementary schools in Herzegovina-Neretva Canton. There are a total of three universities in this canton:

- University of Mostar with 7,135 students and ten faculties.
- University Džemal Bijedić of Mostar with 2,796 students and eight faculties.
- Private university "Herzegovina" in Medjugorje and Mostar with two faculties.

== See also ==
- List of heads of the Herzegovina-Neretva Canton
