= List of heads of the Una-Sana Canton =

Prime Minister of Una-Sana Canton
- Premijer Unsko-sanskog kantona
- Coat of arms of Una-Sana Canton
- Incumbent; Mustafa Ružnić since 23 September 2025
- Appointer: Una-Sana Cantonal Assembly
- Inaugural holder: Mirsad Veladžić (as governor); Mersud Ferizović (as prime minister)
- Formation: 27 May 1995

This is a list of heads of the Una-Sana Canton.

== Heads of the Una-Sana Canton (1995–present) ==
Party of Democratic Action
Party for Bosnia and Herzegovina
Social Democratic Party
Party of Democratic Activity
People's European Union

=== Governors ===
№	Portrait	Name (Born–Died)	Term of Office		Party
1		Mirsad Veladžić (1956–)	27 May 1995	29 November 1999	SDA
2		Adem Borić (1948–)	29 November 1999	31 January 2000	SDA
3		Muhamed Beganović (1942–)	31 January 2000	13 February 2001	SBiH
4		Amir Avdić (1966–)	13 February 2001	1 August 2002	SDA
5		Mirsad Šahinović (1960–)	1 August 2002	6 October 2002	SDA

=== Prime Ministers ===
№	Portrait	Name (Born–Died)	Term of Office		Party
1		Mersud Ferizović (1951–)	15 June 1995	29 October 1996	SDA
2		Esad Brković	29 October 1996	30 November 1998	SDA
3		Sabid Lipović	30 November 1998	30 March 2000	SDA
4		Mustafa Ramić (1942–)	30 March 2000	9 May 2000	SDA
5		Amir Avdić (1966–)	9 May 2000	11 May 2001	SDA
6		Fikret Dervišević (1949–)	11 May 2001	October 2001	SBiH
7		Muhamed Ibrahimpašić	October 2001	20 March 2002	SDA
8		Atif Hodžić (1962–)	20 March 2002	6 March 2003	SDA
9		Fadil Islamović (1966–)	6 March 2003	6 February 2004	SDA
10		Ismet Kumalić (1951–)	6 February 2004	1 December 2006	SDA
11		Osman Čehajić (1958–)	1 December 2006	16 May 2007	SDA
12		Šemsudin Dedić (1973–)	16 May 2007	31 January 2011	SDA
13		Hamdija Lipovača (1976–)	31 January 2011	12 February 2015	SDP BiH
14		Izudin Saračević (1957–)	12 February 2015	10 July 2016	SDA
15		Husein Rošić (1974–)	10 July 2016	17 October 2018	SDA
16		Mustafa Ružnić (1980–)	17 October 2018	5 December 2023	A-SDA (until February 2021)
		Mustafa Ružnić (1980–)	17 October 2018	5 December 2023	NES (from February 2021)
17		Nijaz Hušić (1976–)	5 December 2023	23 September 2025	SDA
(16)		Mustafa Ružnić (1980–)	23 September 2025	Incumbent	NES
