= Mustafa Ružnić =

Bosnian politician (born 1980)

Prime Minister of Una-Sana Canton
- Incumbent
- Assumed office 23 September 2025
- Preceded by: Nijaz Hušić
- In office 17 October 2018 – 5 December 2023
- Preceded by: Husein Rošić
- Succeeded by: Nijaz Hušić

Personal details
- Born: 25 May 1980 (age 46) Cazin, SR Bosnia and Herzegovina, SFR Yugoslavia
- Party: People's European Union (2021–present)
- Other political affiliations: Party of Democratic Activity (until 2021)
- Education: University of Sarajevo; University of Banja Luka

Mustafa Ružnić (born 25 May 1980) is a Bosnian politician who serve as Prime Minister of Una-Sana Canton from 2025, and from 2018 to 2023. He is a member of the People's European Union.

== Early life and education ==
Ružnić studied in Cazin, then graduated in criminology at the University of Sarajevo. In 2016, he obtained a master's degree at the University of Banja Luka. He worked at the Una-Sana Canton employment agency.

== Political career ==
Right after the 2018 general election, on 17 October 2018, the outgoing cantonal assembly removed the government of Husein Rošić (SDA), and Ružnić was appointed prime minister of the canton for a governing coalition which included A-SDA, SDP BiH, DF, NB and DNZ.

In June 2020, Ružnić's adviser Mirsad Topčagić was arrested by the State Investigation and Protection Agency (SIPA). In March 2021, Ružnić was criticised for receiving MPs from the far-right AfD party, which had just been put under surveillance by the German secret services.

Ružnić was succeeded as prime minister by Nijaz Hušić on 5 December 2023, following the removal of Ružnić's government by the SDA. In September 2025, he was once again appointed as prime minister and succeeded on 11 August 2026 by Ibrahim Dizdarić from POMAK. On August 25, 2026, Mustafa Ružnić returned to the position of Prime Minister of Una-Sana Canton (USK) after the Constitutional Court of the Federation of Bosnia and Herzegovina annulled the appointment of the USK Government headed by Ibrahim Dizdarić of POMAK, following a ruling that the appointment had violated the vital national interest of the Serb constituent people.
