= List of heads of the Herzegovina-Neretva Canton =

Heads of canton in the Federation of Bosnia and Herzegovina

Prime Minister of the Herzegovina-Neretva Canton
- Premijer Hercegovačko-neretvanskog kantona
- Coat of arms of the Herzegovina-Neretva Canton
- Incumbent; Marija Buhač since 9 November 2023
- Appointer: Herzegovina-Neretva Cantonal Assembly
- Inaugural holder: Fatima Leho (as governor); Mijo Brajković (as prime minister)
- Formation: 1996

This is a list of heads of the Herzegovina-Neretva Canton.

== Heads of the Herzegovina-Neretva Canton (1996–present) ==
Party of Democratic Action
Croatian Democratic Union
Party for Bosnia and Herzegovina
Croatian Democratic Union 1990

=== Governors ===
№	Portrait	Name (Born–Died)	Term of Office		Party
1		Fatima Leho (1946–)	1996	1 December 1997	SDA
2		Željko Obradović (1964–)	1 December 1997	27 October 1998	HDZ BiH
3		Hamo Masleša	27 October 1998	2000	SDA
4		Rade Bošnjak (1959–)	2000	February 2001	HDZ BiH
5		Šefkija Džiho (1947–)	February 2001	February 2002	SDA
6		Dragan Vrankić (1955–2019)	February 2002	6 October 2002	HDZ BiH

=== Prime Ministers ===
№	Portrait	Name (Born–Died)	Term of Office		Party
1		Mijo Brajković (1940–)	1996	1998	HDZ BiH
2		Frano Ljubić (1946–)	1998	12 November 1999	HDZ BiH
3		Josip Merdžo (1962–)	12 November 1999	2000	HDZ BiH
4		Mirsad Šarić (1951–)	2000	2000	SDA
(3)		Josip Merdžo (1962–)	2000	2001	HDZ BiH
5		Miroslav Ćorić (1956–)	2001	2002	HDZ BiH
6		Omer Macić (1950–2022)	2002	16 June 2003	SBiH
(5)		Miroslav Ćorić (1956–)	16 June 2003	1 August 2007	HDZ BiH
7		Srećko Boras (1957–)	1 August 2007	9 November 2011	HDZ 1990
8		Denis Lasić (1974–)	9 November 2011	9 April 2015	HDZ BiH
9		Stjepan Krasić (1965–)	9 April 2015	23 September 2015	HDZ BiH
10		Nevenko Herceg (1964–)	23 September 2015	9 November 2023	HDZ BiH
11		Marija Buhač (1981–)	9 November 2023	Incumbent	HDZ BiH
