= Ivan Vukadin =

10th Prime Minister of Canton 10
- Incumbent
- Assumed office 21 December 2020
- Preceded by: Ivan Jozić

Municipal Mayor of Tomislavgrad
- In office November 2008 – 23 December 2020
- Preceded by: Zdravko Prka
- Succeeded by: Ivan Buntić

Personal details
- Party: HNP (2020–present)
- Other political affiliations: HDZ BiH (until 2020)
- Education: University of Zagreb

Ivan Vukadin (born 1975) is a Bosnian Croat politician who currently serves as the prime minister of Canton 10, a federal unit in the Federation of Bosnia and Herzegovina, an entity of Bosnia and Herzegovina.

== Biography ==
Ivan Vukadin was born in 1975 in Duvno (present-day Tomislavgrad), then part of the SFR Yugoslavia. He graduated from the Faculty of Political Science, University of Zagreb in 1999. After graduation, he returned to Tomislavgrad and worked for a local transportation company from 2000 to 2003. He earned a master's degree in political science at the Faculty of Political Sciences in Zagreb in 2012.

His political career as a member of the Croatian Democratic Union of Bosnia and Herzegovina (HDZ) started with the 2000 municipal election, when he became a councillor in Tomislavgrad, a term he held until 2004. In 2003, he became an advisor in the Assembly of Canton 10, and served there until 2006. At the 2006 cantonal parliamentary election, he was elected member of the cantonal assembly. His term ended after the 2008 municipal election, when he was elected the municipal mayor of Tomislavgrad, winning his second term in 2012, and third term in 2016.

On 3 April 2020, Vukadin was expelled from the HDZ for breaching the party's statute. On 24 June 2020, Vukadin established the HNP.

On 21 December 2020, twenty six months after the election, he was appointed the prime minister of Canton 10. For the first time in twenty six years, HDZ BiH was not in the cantonal government. After the 2022 parliamentary election, he secured this office for another term on 10 February 2024, following a prolonged technical term.

In 2021, Vukadin was pleased with the investment by China National Technical Import and Export Corporation and Power China Resources into development of a wind farm in Ivovik.
