= Una-Sana Canton =

Canton of the Federation of Bosnia and Herzegovina

Coordinates: 44°44′N 16°12′E

Una-Sana Canton Unsko-sanski kanton (Bosnian) Unsko-sanska županija (Croatian) Унско-сански кантон (Serbian)
- Canton
- Flag Coat of arms

- Una-Sana Canton within Bosnia and Herzegovina
- Country: Bosnia and Herzegovina
- Entity: Federation of Bosnia and Herzegovina
- Cantonal seat: Bihać
- Municipalities: 8 municipalities

Government
  - Prime Minister: Mustafa Ružnić (NES)
  - Legislative Assembly: 30 members: • SDA (8); • NES (8); • SDP (3); • DF (3); • POMAK (3); • NiP (3); • LS (1); • SBiH (1)

Area
  - Total: 4,201 km^{2} (1,622 sq mi)

Population (2013)
  - Total: 273,261
  - Density: 65.05/km^{2} (168.5/sq mi)

Languages
  - Official languages: Bosnian, Croatian, Serbian
- Area code: 037
- ISO 3166 code: BA-01
- HDI (2022): 0.798 high · (4th)
- Website: www.vladausk.ba

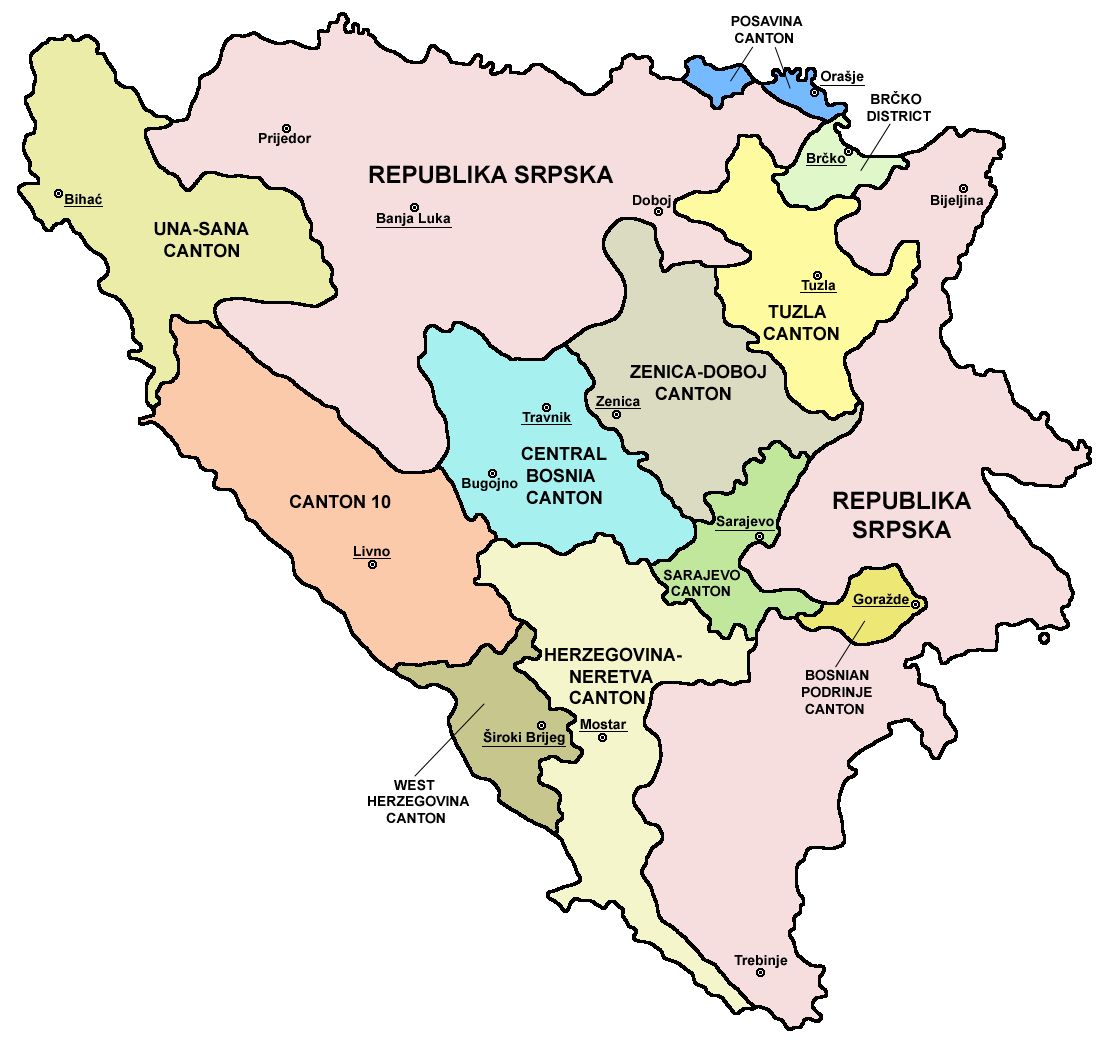
Cantons of the Federation of Bosnia and Herzegovina

The Una-Sana Canton (Bosnian: Unsko-sanski kanton; Croatian: Unsko-sanska županija; Serbian: Унско-сански кантон, romanized: Unsko-sanski kanton) is a federated state and one of the ten cantons of the Federation of Bosnia and Herzegovina in Bosnia and Herzegovina. It is located in the northwest of the country, a region known as Bosanska Krajina, and has been named after the rivers Una and Sana. Its cantonal seat is the city of Bihać.

The canton is bordered by Republika Srpska from the east, the Canton 10 from the southeast, and Croatia from the south, west, and north. The majority of the population is Bosniak (90%).

== Municipalities ==
The Una-Sana Canton consists of eight municipalities:

| Coat of arms | Municipality/City | Population (2013) | Area (km^{2}) |
|---|---|---|---|
| | Cazin | 66,149 | 356 |
| | Bihać | 56,261 | 900 |
| | Sanski Most | 41,475 | 781 |
| | Velika Kladuša | 40,419 | 331 |
| | Bosanska Krupa | 25,545 | 561 |
| | Bužim | 19,340 | 129 |
| | Ključ | 16,744 | 358 |
| | Bosanski Petrovac | 7,328 | 709 |
| | Total | 273,261 | 4,201 |

== History ==
The region has been inhabited since prehistoric times, as evidenced by numerous archaeological sites, ancient fortresses, and medieval towns. Settlements like Bihać, first mentioned by Béla IV of Hungary in 1260, and Ključ, referenced in 1322 by Stephen II, Ban of Bosnia, highlight the area's medieval significance.

In 1463, the Ottoman Empire conquered Ključ, marking the fall of the medieval Bosnian state. During Ottoman rule, fortifications such as Ostrožac Castle, dating back to the 13th century, were expanded to strengthen the empire's hold on the region.

Following the Ottoman period, the area became part of the Austro-Hungarian Empire and later the Kingdom of Yugoslavia, Independent State of Croatia, and finally the Socialist Federal Republic of Yugoslavia.

During the Bosnian War (1992–1995), the region experienced significant conflict, including the Siege of Bihać and the founding of the Autonomous Province of Western Bosnia proto-state, which led to the Intra-Bosnian Muslim War (1993–1995).

The canton was officially established on June 12, 1996, following the Washington Agreement.

== Geography ==
The Una and Sana rivers are central to the canton's geography. The Una flows along the western border, while the Sana river flows along the eastern part. Covering an area of 4,201 square kilometers, Una-Sana Canton accounts for about 8.1% of Bosnia and Herzegovina's total territory. The region's climate is classified as Cfb, characterized by moderate cold winters and warm summers.

== Government ==
Like all cantons of the Federation of Bosnia and Herzegovina, the head of the Una-Sana Canton is called the Prime Minister. The current Prime Minister is Mustafa Ružnić, having served since 23 September 2025. The legislative body of the Canton is the Assembly of the Una-Sana Canton, which has 30 members.

== Demographics ==
Ethnic groups of Una-Sana (2013 census)
1. Bosniaks (90.0%)
2. Serbs (3.09%)
3. Croats (1.86%)
4. Other groups (5.02%)

The liberalisation of the labour market in Germany in 2017 led to a significant wave of emigration from Bosnia and Herzegovina. The Una-Sana Canton has been the leading region in terms of emigration within the country. In 2021, the Cantonal Ministry of Internal Affairs issued 15,900 certificates of impunity for the purpose of working abroad. This marked an increase from around 13,500 certificates issued in 2017, 14,800 in 2018, and 12,200 in 2019. In 2020, the number of certificates issued was around 9,200. Furthermore, in 2021, approximately 1,500 children enrolled in the first year of primary school, which is 2,000 fewer than 20 years ago.

=== 2013 Census ===
| Municipality/City | Nationality | | | | | | Total |
| Municipality/City | Bosniaks | % | Croats | % | Serbs | % | Total |
|---|---|---|---|---|---|---|---|
| Bihać | 49,550 | 88.07 | 3265 | 5.80 | 910 | 1.61 | 56,261 |
| Bosanska Krupa | 23,578 | 92.29 | 66 | 0.25 | 1,260 | 4.93 | 25,545 |
| Bosanski Petrovac | 3,179 | 43.38 | 26 | 0.35 | 3,996 | 54.53 | 7,328 |
| Bužim | 19,207 | 99.31 | 8 | 0.04 | 1 | 0.005 | 19,340 |
| Cazin | 63,463 | 95.93 | 320 | 0.48 | 29 | 0.04 | 66,149 |
| Ključ | 16,130 | 96.33 | 30 | 0.17 | 273 | 1.63 | 16,744 |
| Sanski Most | 38,344 | 92.45 | 722 | 1.74 | 1837 | 4.42 | 41,475 |
| Velika Kladuša | 32,561 | 80.55 | 636 | 1.57 | 146 | 0.36 | 40,419 |
| Canton | 246,012 | 90.03 | 5,073 | 1.86 | 8,452 | 3.09 | 273,261 |

== Infrastructure ==
Due to the proximity to Croatia and its narrow northern outline, various important traffic lines between Zagreb and the Adriatic traverse the Una-Sana canton, such as the railway line Novi Grad-Bihać-Knin. The airport of Željava is located near Bihać and is located right between the Bosnian and Croatian border.

== Economy ==
Since the 1990s, the region's economy has shifted due to war, migration, and reconstruction. Though among the less industrialized cantons in the Federation, it has strong potential in renewable energy, tourism, and border trade with Croatia. Agriculture remains key in rural areas like Cazin, Bosanska Krupa, and Sanski Most, while forestry and timber exports are also significant. Industry is centered in Bihać, Velika Kladuša, and Cazin. Tourism is growing, led by the Una National Park.

Labor migration is high, with over 10,000 people leaving annually for work in the EU, making it one of the most migration-prone areas in Bosnia and Herzegovina.

== See also ==
- Political divisions of Bosnia and Herzegovina
- Bosanska Krajina
- List of heads of the Una-Sana Canton
