= Croatian National Shift =

Croatian National Shift Hrvatski nacionalni pomak
- President: Ivan Vukadin
- Founded: 24 June 2020
- Split from: Croatian Democratic Union of Bosnia and Herzegovina
- Headquarters: Trg Franje Tuđmana bb, Tomislavgrad
- Ideology: Conservatism; Regionalism
- Political position: Centre-right
- National affiliation: Croatian Five; HDZ 1990 – HNP
- Colours: Red, blue
- Slogan: Pomak, a ne uzmak! (A shift, not a retreat!)
- HoR BiH: 0 / 42
- HoP BiH: 0 / 15
- HoR FBiH: 1 / 98
- HoP FBiH: 1 / 80
- Cantonal Heads: 1 / 10
- Mayors: 1 / 145

Website
- hnp.ba

The Croatian National Shift (Croatian: Hrvatski nacionalni pomak or HNP) is a minor Croatian political party in Bosnia and Herzegovina.

== History ==
The HNP was founded on 24 June 2020 by Ivan Vukadin and other former members of the Croatian Democratic Union of Bosnia and Herzegovina.

On 31 May 2024, a coalition agreement was signed in Tomislavgrad between the Croatian Democratic Union 1990 (HDZ 1990) and the HNP. The agreement was signed by Mladen Šarić, president of the municipal branch of the HDZ 1990 in Tomislavgrad and member of the Federal House of Peoples, and Ivan Buntić, president of the municipal branch of the HNP Tomislavgrad and mayor of Tomislavgrad. The signing of the agreement was attended by other officials of the two parties, headed by Ilija Cvitanović, president of the HDZ 1990 and Ivan Vukadin, president of the HNP. The signing of the agreement followed four years of successful cooperation in the municipality of Tomislavgrad and the formation of the Government of Canton 10, whose core consists of the HDZ 1990 and the HNP.

== Election results ==
=== Parliamentary Assembly of Bosnia and Herzegovina ===
Parliamentary Assembly of Bosnia and Herzegovina
Year	#	Popular vote	%	HoR	Seat change	HoP	Seat change	Government
2022 (Note: Run in coalition with HDZ 1990.)	14th	25,691	1.62	0 / 42	New	0 / 15	New	Extra-parliamentary
2026 (Note: Run as part of Croatian Five, which won a single seat that went to HDZ 1990.)	10th	36,637	2.71	0 / 42	0	0 / 15	0	Extra-parliamentary

=== Parliament of the Federation of Bosnia and Herzegovina ===
Parliament of the Federation of Bosnia and Herzegovina
Year	#	Popular vote	%	HoR	Seat change	HoP	Seat change	Government
2022	17th	5,351	0.55	1 / 98	New	1 / 80	New	Support
2026	15th	3,689	0.48	1 / 98	0	TBD	TBD	TBD

=== Presidency elections ===
Presidency of Bosnia and Herzegovina
Election year	#	Candidate	Votes	%	Note	Representing	Elected?
2022	2nd	Borjana Krišto	180,255	44.20%	Support	Croats	No
2026	3rd	Zdenko Lučić	54,900	22.88%	Support	Croats	No
