= Civic Alliance (Bosnia and Herzegovina) =

Political party in Bosnia and Herzegovina

Civic Alliance Građanski savez
- Leader: Muhamed Fazlagić
- Secretary-General: Ozren Blagovčanin
- Founder: Reuf Bajrović
- Founded: 21 May 2016
- Split from: Democratic Front
- Headquarters: Koševo 6, Sarajevo
- Ideology: Civic nationalism; Social democracy; Social liberalism; Pro-Europeanism
- Political position: Centre to centre-left
- National affiliation: DF–GS
- Colors: Yellow
- Slogan: "Za građansku državu!" "For a civic state!"
- HoR BiH: 0 / 42
- HoP BiH: 0 / 15
- HoR FBiH: 0 / 98
- HoP FBiH: 0 / 80
- NA RS: 0 / 83

Civic Alliance (Bosnian: Građanski savez) is a centre-left political party in Bosnia and Herzegovina. It was founded in 2016 by Reuf Bajrović. The party's mayoral candidate in Bihać municipality won the mayoral race in 2016. In 2018, the Civic Alliance entered a coalition with the Democratic Front for all parliamentary races and the Presidency of Bosnia and Herzegovina. The DF–GS coalition candidate Željko Komšić won the race for the Croat Member of Bosnia and Herzegovina Presidency and the coalition entered all parliaments.

== Election results ==
=== Parliamentary Assembly of Bosnia and Herzegovina ===
Parliamentary Assembly of Bosnia and Herzegovina
Year	Leader	#	Popular vote	%	HoR	Seat change	HoP	Seat change	Government
2018 (Note: Run in coalition with DF, which won all the seats obtained by the coalition.)	Muhamed Fazlagić	6th	96,174	5.81	0 / 42	New	0 / 15	New	Extra-parliamentary
2022	Muhamed Fazlagić	6th	101,713	6.41	0 / 42	0	0 / 15	0	Extra-parliamentary
2026	Muhamed Fazlagić	9th	51,088	3.77	0 / 42	0	0 / 15	0	Extra-parliamentary
