= 2004 Bosnian municipal elections =

- 2 October 2004

All 144 municipal/city mayors All 144 municipal/city councils
- Turnout: 46.80%
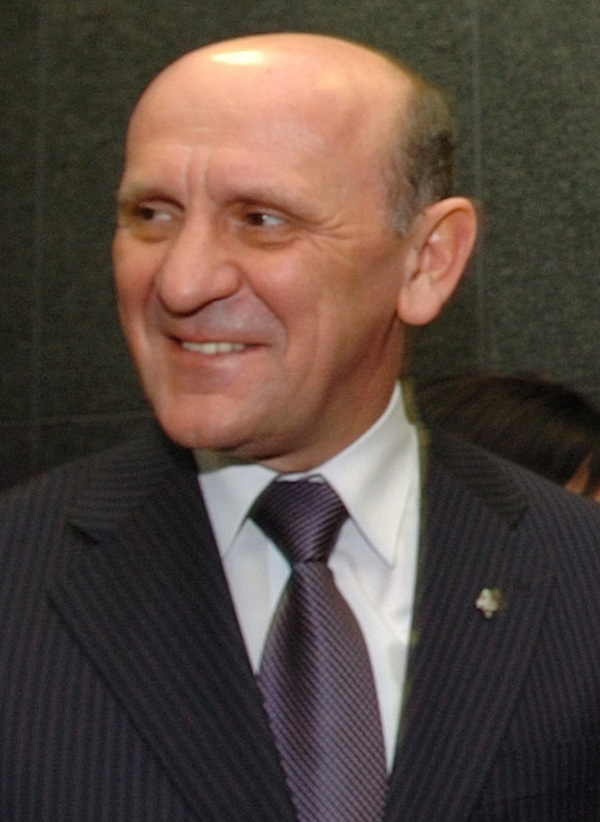

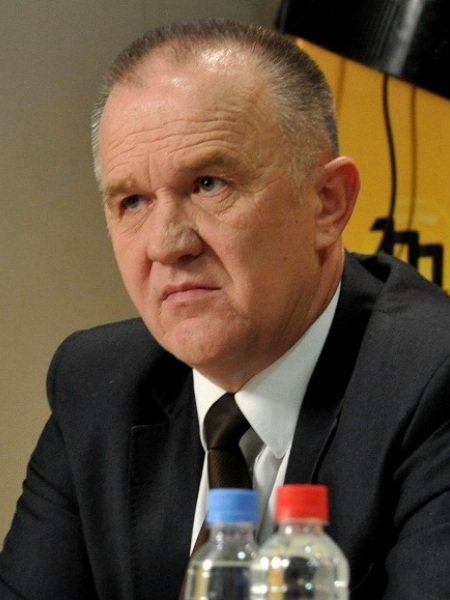

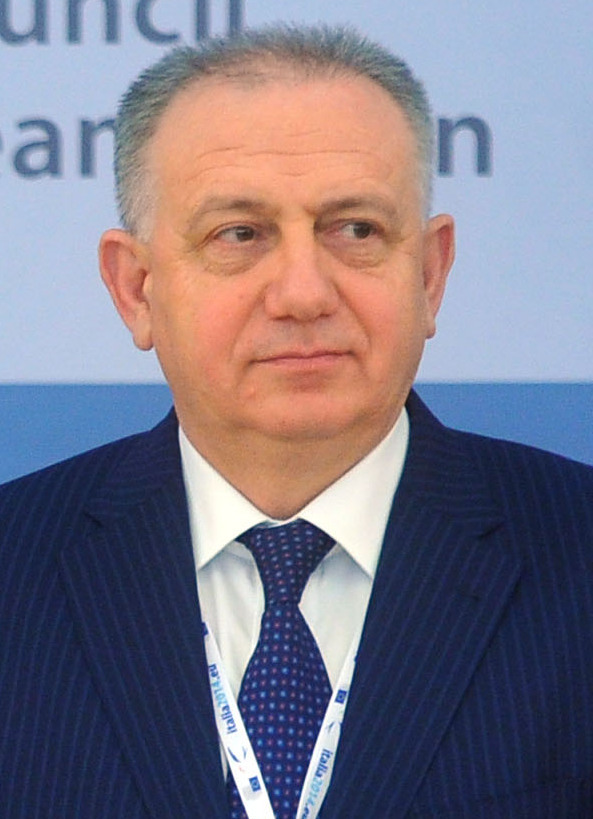

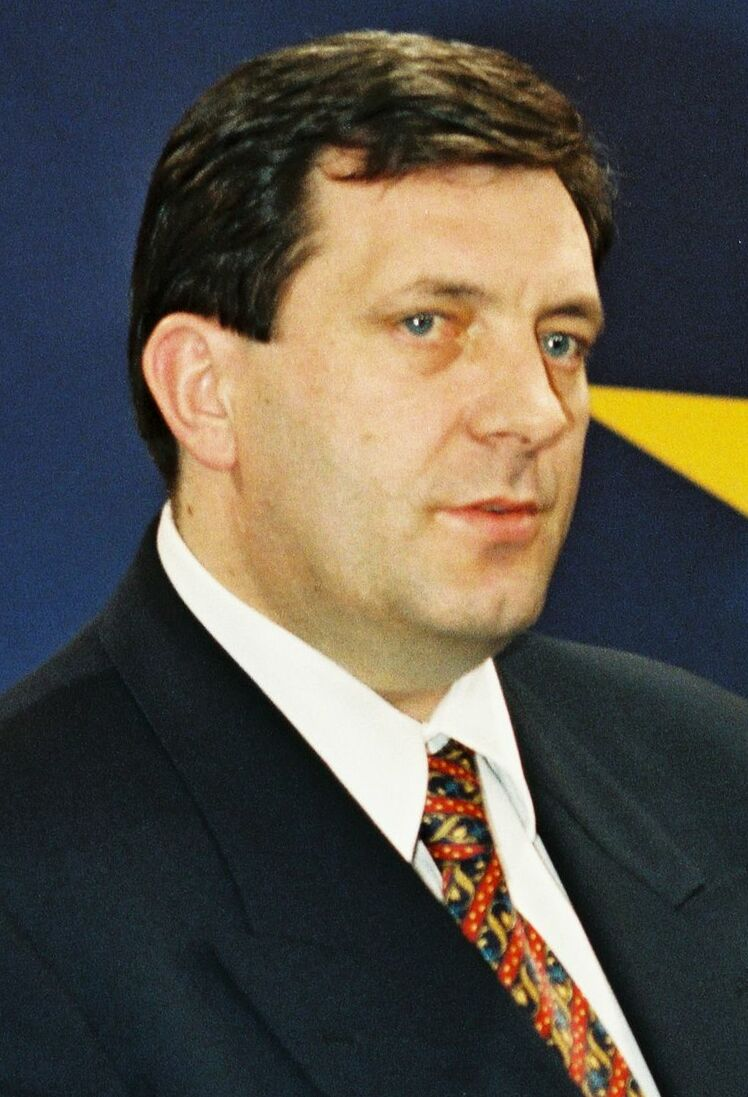

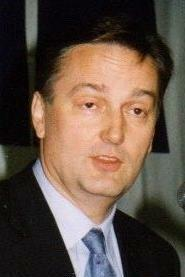

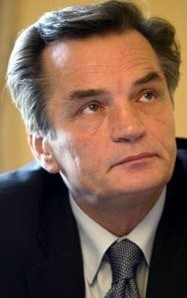
	First party	Second party	Third party
Leader	Sulejman Tihić	Dragan Čavić	Bariša Čolak
Party	SDA	SDS	HDZ BiH
Mayors	36	35	21
Percentage	25.00%	24.30%	14.58%
	Fourth party	Fifth party	Sixth party
Leader	Milorad Dodik	Zlatko Lagumdžija	Haris Silajdžić
Party	SNSD	SDP BiH	SBiH
Mayors	17	13	4
Percentage	11.80%	9.02%	2.77%
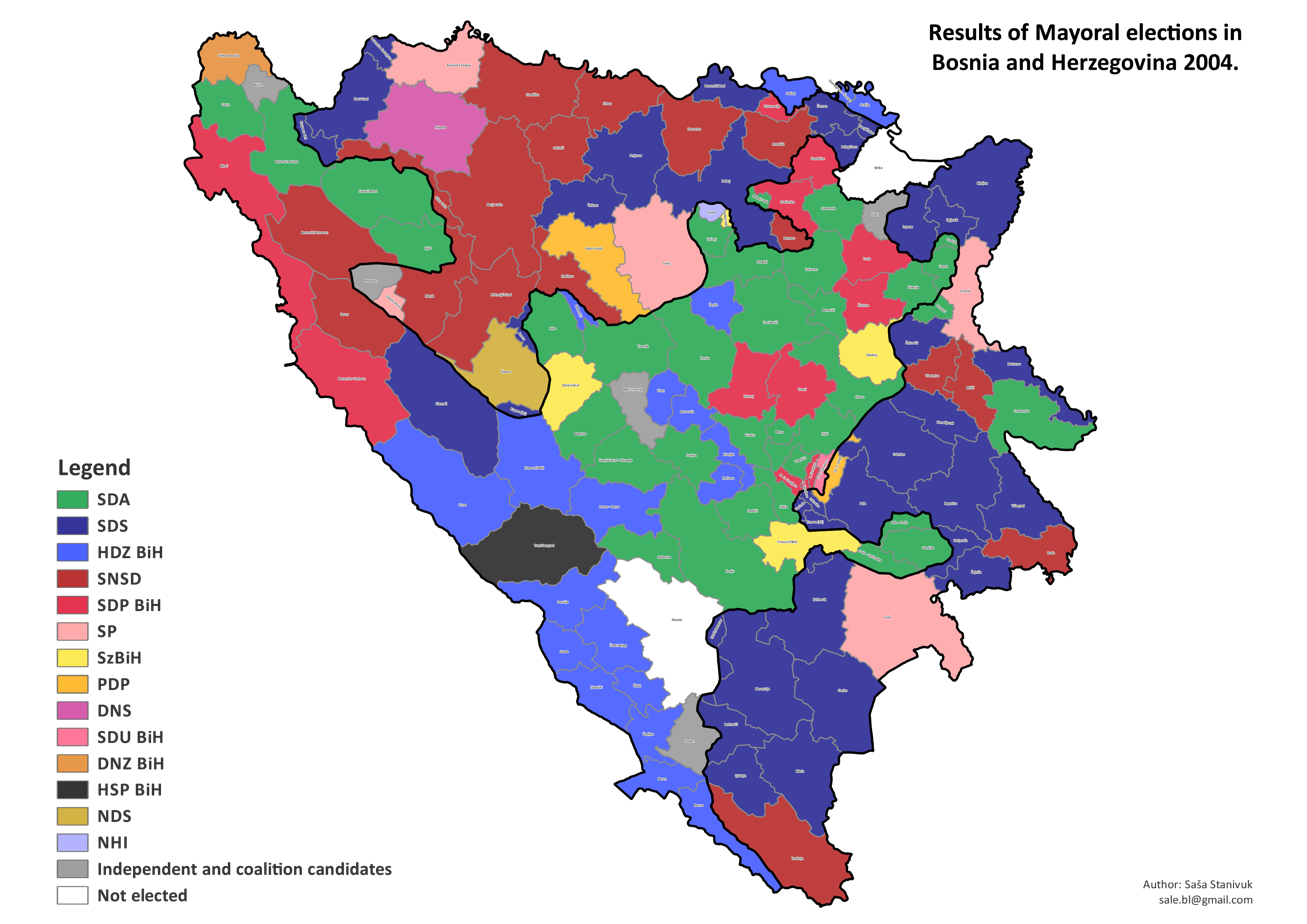
- Results by municipality.

Municipal elections were held in Bosnia and Herzegovina on 2 October 2004 to elect mayors and assemblies in 144 municipalities and cities.

== Federation of Bosnia and Herzegovina ==
Municipality	Mayor's party
Banovići	Party of Democratic Action
Bihać	Social Democratic Party
Bosanska Krupa	Party of Democratic Action
Bosanski Petrovac	Alliance of Independent Social Democrats
Bosansko Grahovo	Social Democratic Party
Breza	Party of Democratic Action
Bugojno	Party of Democratic Action
Busovača	Croatian Democratic Union
Bužim	Independent
Čapljina	Croatian Democratic Union
Cazin	Party of Democratic Action
Čelić	Independent
Centar, Sarajevo	Social Democratic Party
Čitluk	Croatian Democratic Union
Drvar	Alliance of Independent Social Democrats
Doboj East	Party of Democratic Action
Doboj South	Party for Bosnia and Herzegovina
Dobretići	Croatian Democratic Union
Domaljevac-Šamac	Croatian Democratic Union
Donji Vakuf	Party for Bosnia and Herzegovina
Foča-Ustikolina	Party of Democratic Action
Fojnica	Party of Democratic Action
Glamoč	Serbian Democratic Party
Goražde	Party of Democratic Action
Gornji Vakuf-Uskoplje	Party of Democratic Action
Gračanica	Social Democratic Party
Gradačac	Social Democratic Party
Grude	Croatian Democratic Union
Hadžići	Party of Democratic Action
Ilidža	Party of Democratic Action
Ilijaš	Party of Democratic Action
Jablanica	Party of Democratic Action
Jajce	Party of Democratic Action
Kakanj	Social Democratic Party
Kalesija	Party of Democratic Action
Kiseljak	Croatian Democratic Union
Kladanj	Party for Bosnia and Herzegovina
Ključ	Party of Democratic Action
Konjic	Party of Democratic Action
Kreševo	Croatian Democratic Union
Kupres	Croatian Democratic Union
Livno	Croatian Democratic Union
Ljubuški	Croatian Democratic Union
Lukavac	Party of Democratic Action
Maglaj	Party of Democratic Action
Mostar	Croatian Democratic Union
Neum	Croatian Democratic Union
Novi Grad, Sarajevo	Social Democratic Party
Novo Sarajevo	Social Democratic Party
Novi Travnik	New Croatian Initiative
Odžak	Croatian Democratic Union
Olovo	Party of Democratic Action
Orašje	Croatian Democratic Union
Pale-Prača	Party of Democratic Action
Posušje	Croatian Democratic Union
Prozor-Rama	Croatian Democratic Union
Ravno	Croatian Democratic Union
Sanski Most	Party of Democratic Action
Sapna	Party of Democratic Action
Sarajevo	Party of Democratic Action
Široki Brijeg	Croatian Democratic Union
Srebrenik	Party of Democratic Action
Stari Grad, Sarajevo	Social Democratic Union
Stolac	Croatian coalition (HDZ, HSP, HKDU)
Teočak	Party of Democratic Action
Tešanj	Party of Democratic Action
Tomislavgrad	Croatian Party of Right
Travnik	Party of Democratic Action
Trnovo (FBiH)	Party for Bosnia and Herzegovina
Tuzla	Social Democratic Party
Usora	New Croatian Initiative
Vareš	Social Democratic Party
Velika Kladuša	Democratic People's Community
Visoko	Party of Democratic Action
Vitez	Croatian Democratic Union
Vogošća	Party of Democratic Action
Zavidovići	Party of Democratic Action
Zenica	Party of Democratic Action
Žepče	Croatian Democratic Union
Živinice	Social Democratic Party

== Republika Srpska ==
Municipality	Mayor's party
Berkovići	Serbian Democratic Party
Bijeljina	Serbian Democratic Party
Bileća	Serbian Democratic Party
Bosanska Kostajnica	Serbian Democratic Party
Bosanski Brod	Serbian Democratic Party
Bratunac	Serbian Democratic Party
Čajniče	Serbian Democratic Party
Čelinac	Serbian Democratic Party
Derventa	Alliance of Independent Social Democrats
Doboj	Serbian Democratic Party
Donji Žabar	Serbian Democratic Party
Foča	Socialist Party of Republika Srpska
Gacko	Serbian Democratic Party
Grad Banja Luka	Alliance of Independent Social Democrats
Gradiška	Alliance of Independent Social Democrats
Han Pijesak	Serbian Democratic Party
Istočni Drvar	Socialist Party of Republika Srpska
Istočna Ilidža	Serbian Democratic Party
Istočni Mostar	Serbian Democratic Party
Istočni Stari Grad	Party of Democratic Progress
Istočno Novo Sarajevo	Serbian Democratic Party
Jezero	Serbian Democratic Party
Kalinovik	Serbian Democratic Party
Kneževo	Alliance of Independent Social Democrats
Kozarska Dubica	Socialist Party of Republika Srpska
Kotor Varoš	Party of Democratic Progress
Krupa na Uni	Serbian Democratic Party
Kupres	Serbian Democratic Party
Laktaši	Alliance of Independent Social Democrats
Ljubinje	Serbian Democratic Party
Lopare	Serbian Democratic Party
Milići	Alliance of Independent Social Democrats
Modriča	Alliance of Independent Social Democrats
Mrkonjić Grad	Alliance of Independent Social Democrats
Nevesinje	Serbian Democratic Party
Novi Grad	Serbian Democratic Party
Novo Goražde	Serbian Democratic Party
Osmaci	Party of Democratic Action
Oštra Luka	Alliance of Independent Social Democrats
Pale	Serbian Democratic Party
Pelagićevo	Serbian Democratic Party
Petrovac	Independent
Petrovo	Alliance of Independent Social Democrats
Prijedor	Democratic People's Alliance
Prnjavor	Serbian Democratic Party
Ribnik	Alliance of Independent Social Democrats
Rogatica	Serbian Democratic Party
Rudo	Alliance of Independent Social Democrats
Šamac	Serbian Democratic Party
Šekovići	Serbian Democratic Party
Šipovo	People's Democratic Party
Sokolac	Serbian Democratic Party
Srbac	Alliance of Independent Social Democrats
Srebrenica	Party of Democratic Action
Teslić	Socialist Party of Republika Srpska
Trebinje	Alliance of Independent Social Democrats
Trnovo	Serbian Democratic Party
Ugljevik	Serbian Democratic Party
Višegrad	Serbian Democratic Party
Vlasenica	Alliance of Independent Social Democrats
Vukosavlje	Social Democratic Party
Zvornik	Socialist Party of Republika Srpska

== Assembly of Brčko District ==
Constituency	Council				Mayor elected by Council		
Constituency	Party	Popular vote	%	Seats	Mayor	Votes	%
Brčko	Social Democratic Party	5,743	18.60	6	Mirsad Đapo, SDP BiH	20	69%
Brčko	Serb Democratic Party	5,340	17.29	6			
Brčko	Party of Democratic Action	3,192	10.34	4			
Brčko	Party for Bosnia and Herzegovina	2,546	8.24	3			
Brčko	Croatian Democratic Union	2,358	7.64	3			
Brčko	Socialist Party	2,049	6.64	2			
Brčko	Alliance of Independent Social Democrats	1,537	4.98	2			
Brčko	HSS BiH—NHI	1,344	4.35	2			
Brčko	Democratic Party	1,089	3.53	1			
Total		30,881		29			
