= 2008 Bosnian municipal elections =

- 5 October 2008

All 144 municipal/city mayors All 144 municipal/city councils
- Turnout: 55.28% (▲8.48 pp)
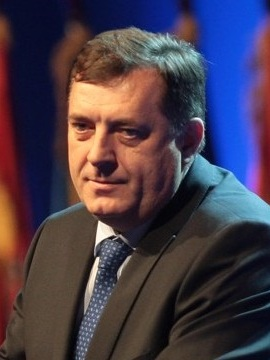

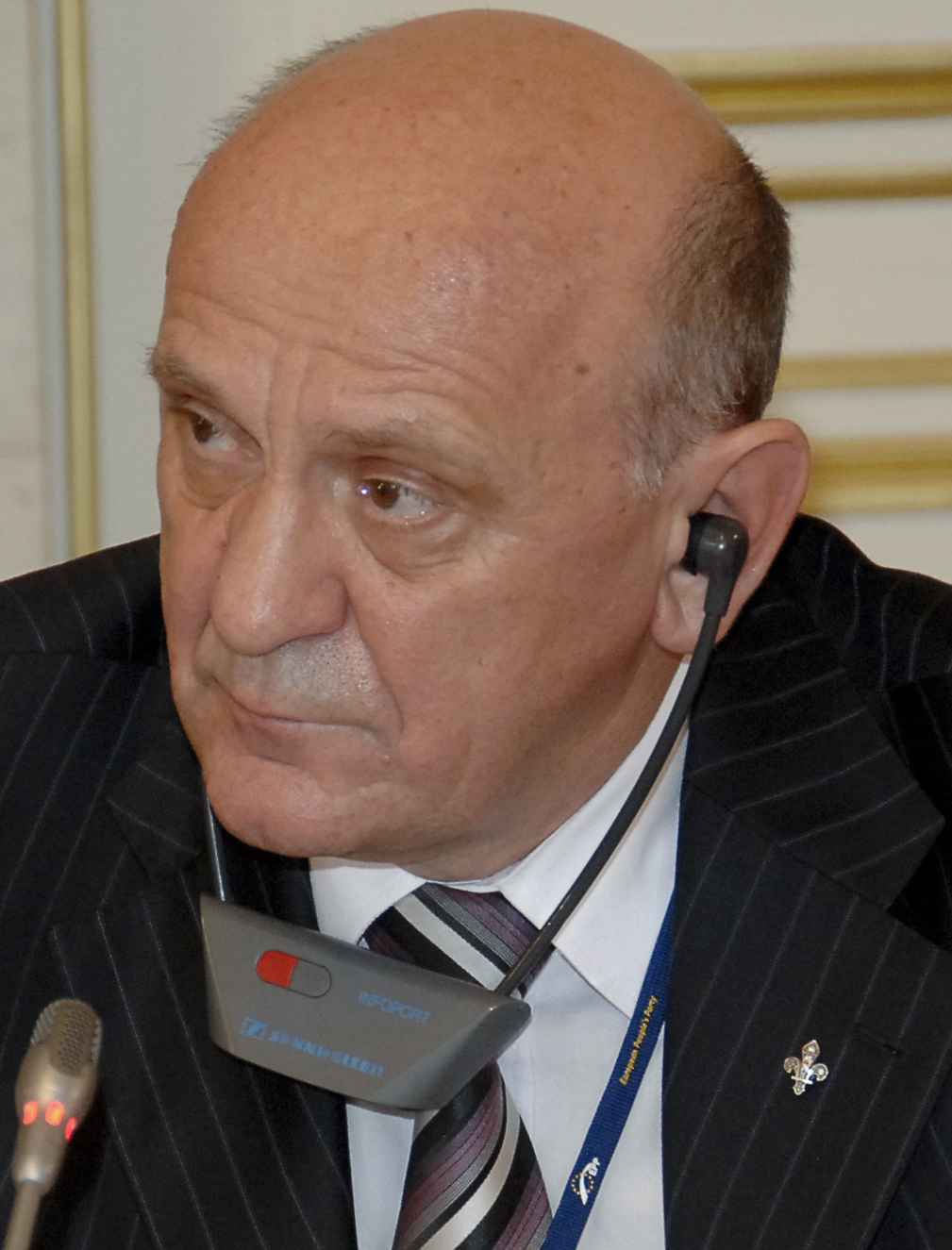

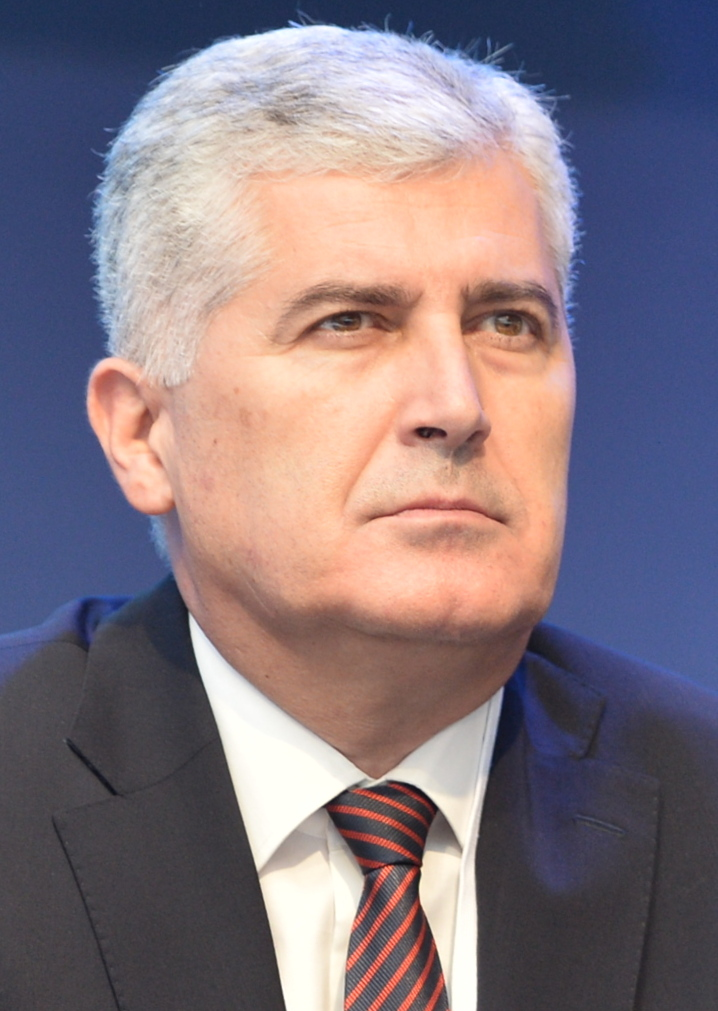

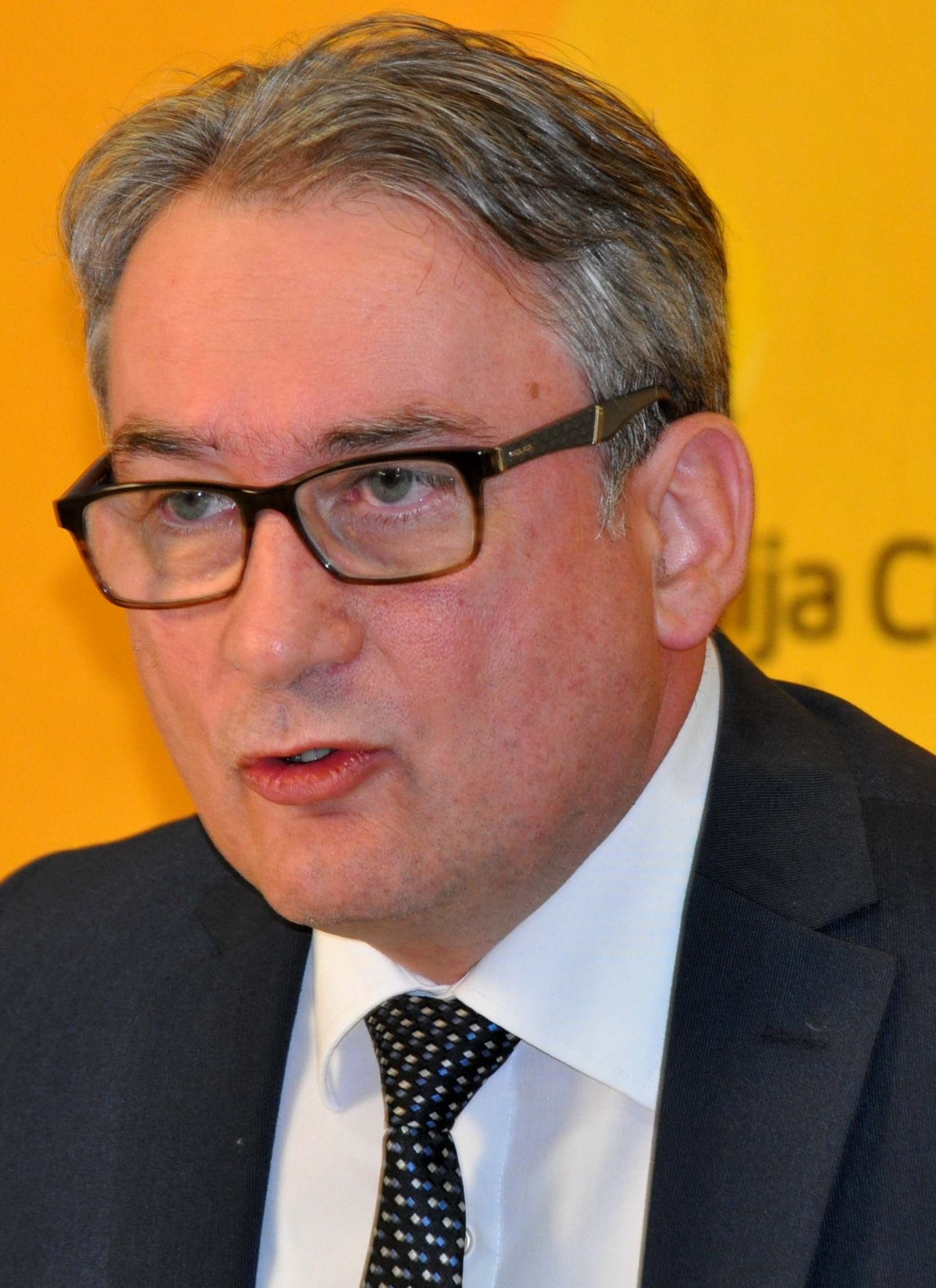

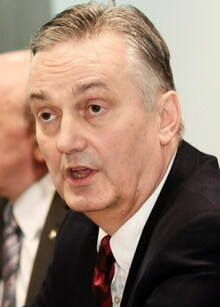

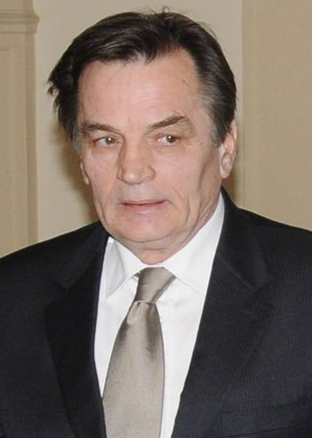
	First party	Second party	Third party
Leader	Milorad Dodik	Sulejman Tihić	Dragan Čović
Party	SNSD	SDA	HDZ BiH
Mayors	42	38	17
Change	▲25	▲2	▼4
Percentage	29.16%	26.38%	11.80%
	Fourth party	Fifth party	Sixth party
Leader	Mladen Bosić	Zlatko Lagumdžija	Haris Silajdžić
Party	SDS	SDP BiH	SBiH
Mayors	16	10	4
Change	▼19	▼3	Steady
Percentage	11.11%	6.94%	2.77%
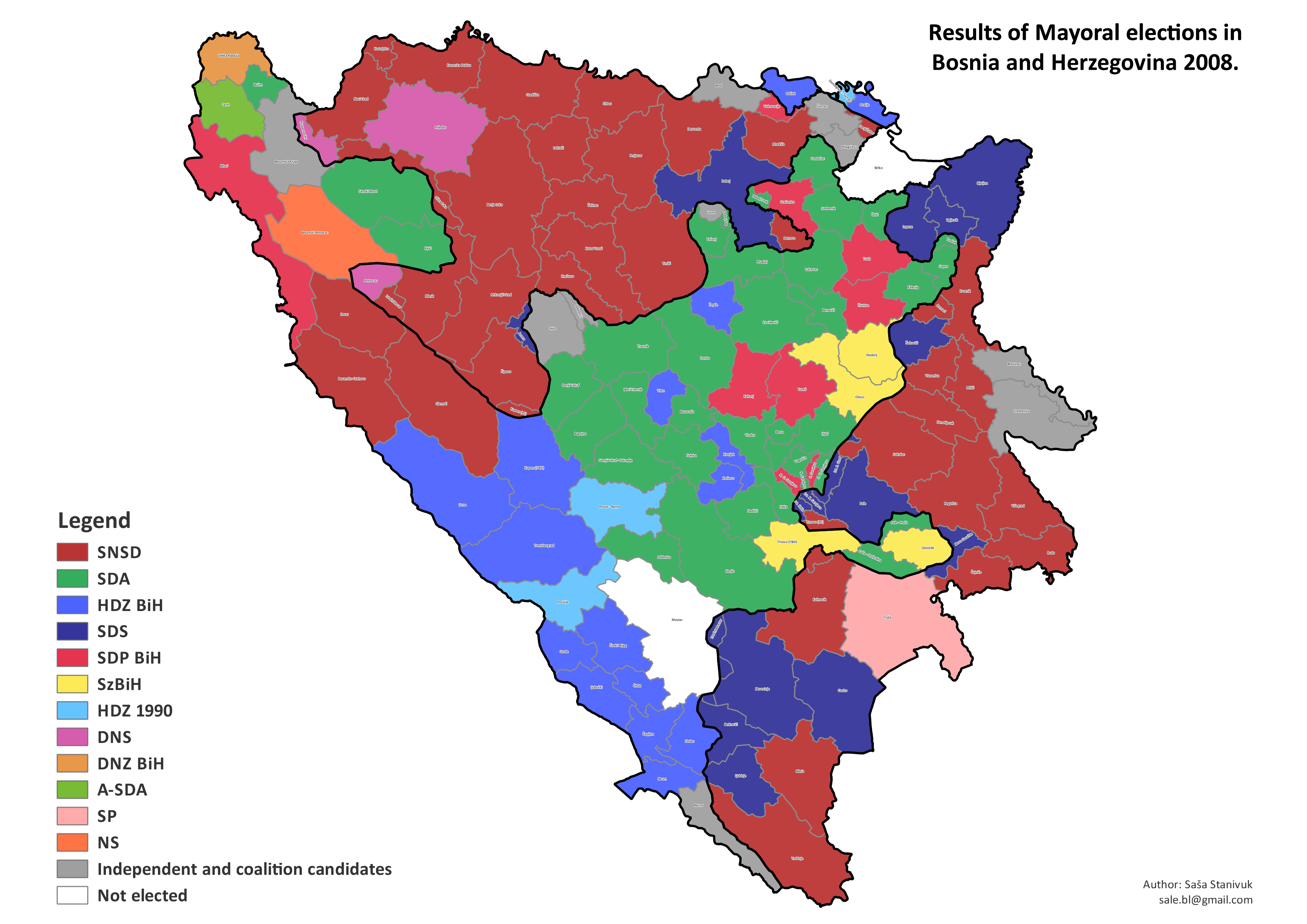
- Results by municipality.

Municipal elections were held in Bosnia and Herzegovina on 5 October 2008. Parties and independent candidates had to register by 23 May 2008, party or coalition lists by 25 June 2008. These were the first local elections were representatives of minorities were elected to the municipal assemblies.

64 political parties and 183 independent candidates were certified to stand in the election.

Nationalist parties (the Party of Democratic Action and the Croatian Democratic Union of Bosnia and Herzegovina in the federation and the Alliance of Independent Social Democrats in the RS) were the most successful in the election, while the Party for Bosnia and Herzegovina was considered to have been the loser of the election. Turnout was 55% (an increase and more than expected), but only 40% in the cities, were the voters were the most supportive of smaller, multi-ethnic parties.

== Federation of Bosnia and Herzegovina ==
Municipality	Mayor's party
Banovići	Party of Democratic Action
Bihać	Social Democratic Party
Bosanska Krupa	Independent
Bosanski Petrovac	Our Party
Bosansko Grahovo	Alliance of Independent Social Democrats
Breza	Party of Democratic Action
Bugojno	Party of Democratic Action
Busovača	Party of Democratic Action
Bužim	Party of Democratic Action
Čapljina	Croatian Democratic Union
Cazin	Party of Democratic Activity
Čelić	Party of Democratic Action
Centar, Sarajevo	Social Democratic Party
Čitluk	Croatian Democratic Union
Drvar	Alliance of Independent Social Democrats
Doboj East	Party of Democratic Action
Doboj South	Party of Democratic Action
Dobretići	Croatian coalition (HDZ 1990, HSP, HSS, NHI)
Domaljevac-Šamac	Croatian Democratic Union 1990
Donji Vakuf	Party of Democratic Action
Foča-Ustikolina	Party of Democratic Action
Fojnica	Party of Democratic Action
Glamoč	Alliance of Independent Social Democrats
Goražde	Party for Bosnia and Herzegovina
Gornji Vakuf-Uskoplje	Party of Democratic Action
Gračanica	Social Democratic Party
Gradačac	Party of Democratic Action
Grude	Croatian Democratic Union
Hadžići	Party of Democratic Action
Ilidža	Party of Democratic Action
Ilijaš	Party of Democratic Action
Jablanica	Party of Democratic Action
Jajce	Party of Democratic Action
Kakanj	Social Democratic Party
Kalesija	Party of Democratic Action
Kiseljak	Croatian Democratic Union
Kladanj	Party for Bosnia and Herzegovina
Ključ	Party of Democratic Action
Konjic	Party of Democratic Action
Kreševo	Croatian Democratic Union
Kupres	Croatian Democratic Union
Livno	Croatian Democratic Union
Ljubuški	Croatian Democratic Union
Lukavac	Party of Democratic Action
Maglaj	Party of Democratic Action
Mostar	Croatian Democratic Union
Neum	Croatian Democratic Union
Novi Grad, Sarajevo	Social Democratic Party
Novo Sarajevo	Party of Democratic Action
Novi Travnik	Party of Democratic Action
Odžak	Croatian Democratic Union
Olovo	Party for Bosnia and Herzegovina
Orašje	Croatian Democratic Union
Pale-Prača	Party of Democratic Action
Posušje	Croatian Democratic Union 1990
Prozor-Rama	Croatian Democratic Union 1990
Ravno	Croatian coalition (HDZ, HDZ 1990)
Sanski Most	Party of Democratic Action
Sapna	Party of Democratic Action
Sarajevo	Social Democratic Party
Široki Brijeg	Croatian Democratic Union
Srebrenik	Party of Democratic Action
Stari Grad, Sarajevo	Party of Democratic Action
Stolac	Croatian Democratic Union
Teočak	Party of Democratic Action
Tešanj	Party of Democratic Action
Tomislavgrad	Croatian Democratic Union
Travnik	Party of Democratic Action
Trnovo (FBiH)	Party for Bosnia and Herzegovina
Tuzla	Social Democratic Party
Usora	Croatian coalition (HSS, NHI)
Vareš	Social Democratic Party
Velika Kladuša	Democratic People's Community
Visoko	Party of Democratic Action
Vitez	Croatian Democratic Union
Vogošća	Party of Democratic Action
Zavidovići	Party of Democratic Action
Zenica	Party of Democratic Action
Žepče	Croatian Democratic Union
Živinice	Social Democratic Party

== Republika Srpska ==
Municipality	Mayor's party
Berkovići	Serbian Democratic Party
Bijeljina	Serbian Democratic Party
Bileća	Alliance of Independent Social Democrats
Bosanska Kostajnica	Alliance of Independent Social Democrats
Bosanski Brod	Alliance of Independent Social Democrats, Socialist Party of Republika Srpska
Bratunac	Serbian Democratic Party, Democratic People's Alliance, SRS RS, Socialist Party of Republika Srpska
Čajniče	Alliance of Independent Social Democrats
Čelinac	Alliance of Independent Social Democrats
Derventa	Alliance of Independent Social Democrats
Doboj	Serbian Democratic Party
Donji Žabar	Alliance of Independent Social Democrats
Foča	Socialist Party of Republika Srpska
Gacko	Serbian Democratic Party
Grad Banja Luka	Alliance of Independent Social Democrats
Gradiška	Alliance of Independent Social Democrats
Han Pijesak	Alliance of Independent Social Democrats
Istočni Drvar	Alliance of Independent Social Democrats
Istočna Ilidža	Serbian Democratic Party
Istočni Mostar	Serbian Democratic Party
Istočni Stari Grad	Serbian Democratic Party
Istočno Novo Sarajevo	Serbian Democratic Party
Jezero	Serbian Democratic Party
Kalinovik	Alliance of Independent Social Democrats
Kneževo	Alliance of Independent Social Democrats
Kozarska Dubica	Alliance of Independent Social Democrats
Kotor Varoš	Alliance of Independent Social Democrats
Krupa na Uni	Democratic People's Alliance
Kupres	Alliance of Independent Social Democrats
Laktaši	Alliance of Independent Social Democrats
Ljubinje	Serbian Democratic Party
Lopare	Serbian Democratic Party
Milići	Alliance of Independent Social Democrats
Modriča	Alliance of Independent Social Democrats
Mrkonjić Grad	Alliance of Independent Social Democrats
Nevesinje	Serbian Democratic Party
Novi Grad	Alliance of Independent Social Democrats
Novo Goražde	Serbian Democratic Party
Osmaci	Alliance of Independent Social Democrats
Oštra Luka	Alliance of Independent Social Democrats
Pale	Serbian Democratic Party
Pelagićevo	Independent
Petrovac	Democratic People's Alliance
Petrovo	Alliance of Independent Social Democrats
Prijedor	Democratic People's Alliance
Prnjavor	Alliance of Independent Social Democrats
Ribnik	Alliance of Independent Social Democrats
Rogatica	Alliance of Independent Social Democrats
Rudo	Alliance of Independent Social Democrats
Šamac	Alliance of Independent Social Democrats, Socialist Party of Republika Srpska
Šekovići	Serbian Democratic Party
Šipovo	Alliance of Independent Social Democrats
Sokolac	Alliance of Independent Social Democrats
Srbac	Alliance of Independent Social Democrats
Srebrenica	Party of Democratic Action
Teslić	Alliance of Independent Social Democrats
Trebinje	Alliance of Independent Social Democrats
Trnovo	Alliance of Independent Social Democrats
Ugljevik	Serbian Democratic Party
Višegrad	Alliance of Independent Social Democrats
Vlasenica	Alliance of Independent Social Democrats
Vukosavlje	Social Democratic Party
Zvornik	Alliance of Independent Social Democrats

== Assembly of Brčko District ==
Constituency	Council				Mayor elected by Council		
Constituency	Party	Popular vote	%	Seats	Mayor	Votes	%
Brčko	Social Democratic Party	10,262	22.43	8	Dragan Pajić, SNSD	23	74%
Brčko	SDS—DNS—PDP—SRS RS	8,448	13.05	6			
Brčko	Alliance of Independent Social Democrats	5,878	11.53	4			
Brčko	Party for Bosnia and Herzegovina	3,712	8.24	3			
Brčko	Croatian Democratic Union	3,618	8.03	2			
Brčko	NDS—DSS	2,750	6.10	2			
Brčko	HDZ 1990—HSS—NHI—HSP	2,630	5.84	2			
Brčko	Party of Democratic Action	2,188	4.86	2			
Brčko	SP—PSRS	1,969	4,37	1			
Brčko	Minority candidate Avdo Aljić	(71)	-	1			
Total		45,055		31			
