= 2006 West Herzegovina parliamentary election =

Cantonal election in Bosnia and Herzegovina

- 1 October 2006
- All 23 seats in the Assembly of the West Herzegovina Canton; 12 seats needed for a majority
- Turnout: 51.02%
Party	Leader	Vote %	Seats	+/–
HDZ BiH (Note: Seat comparisons use the following 2002 results: the HDZ–Christian Democrats–HNZ coalition for HDZ BiH, HKDU for Croat Unity, and the combined HSP and NHI results for HSP Đapić–Jurišić–NHI. Each 2002 seat is counted once. The one seat held by Hrvatski pravaški blok in 2002 is shown separately because no 2006 list appeared under that name.)	Anđelko Mikulić	36.68	9	−9
Croat Unity (HDZ 1990)	Vjekoslav Bakula	30.44	8	+7
HSP Đapić–Jurišić–NHI	Branko Ćorluka	16.78	4	+3
NSRzB	Miro Pejić (Pipanović)	9.22	2	0
This lists parties that won seats. See the complete results below.
Prime Minister before	Prime Minister after
Viktor Lasić; HDZ BiH	Zvonko Jurišić; HSP BiH

The 2006 West Herzegovina parliamentary election was held on 1 October 2006 to elect all 23 members of the Assembly of the West Herzegovina Canton in West Herzegovina Canton, one of the ten cantons of the Federation of Bosnia and Herzegovina. It was part of the 2006 Bosnian general election.

The Croatian Democratic Union of Bosnia and Herzegovina (HDZ BiH) won nine of the 23 seats. The Hrvatsko zajedništvo coalition, led by HDZ 1990, won eight; the HSP Đapić–Jurišić–NHI coalition won four; and the People's Party Work for Prosperity (NSRzB) won two.

== Results ==
Nine lists contested the election. The election received 25,610 valid votes and 1,437 invalid ballots. Vote shares are reproduced as reported and may not sum to 100%. Seat comparisons are with the 2002 election.

Certified results
Party or alliance	Votes	%	Seats	Change from 2002
HDZ BiH	9,395	36.68	9	−9
Croat Unity (HDZ 1990–HZ–HSS–HKDU–HDU–HKD)	7,795	30.44	8	+7
HSP Đapić–Jurišić–NHI	4,298	16.78	4	+3
NSRzB	2,361	9.22	2	0
SDP BiH	439	1.71	0	0
SP/U BiH	433	1.69	0	0
DSI	343	1.34	0	0
HNZ–HNS	306	1.19	0	0
HB	240	0.94	0	0
HPB	—	—	0	−1
Total	25,610	100.00	23	0
Source: Central Election Commission of Bosnia and Herzegovina (2006 results and comparison with 2002).

Ballot totals and turnout
Ballot category	Number	% of ballots cast
Valid votes	25,610	94.69
Invalid ballots	1,437	5.31
Total ballots cast	27,047	100.00
Registered voters	53,015	—
Turnout	51.02%	
Source: Central Election Commission of Bosnia and Herzegovina.

Valid votes by voting method
Voting method	Valid votes	% of valid votes
Regular	25,346	98.97
Postal	81	0.32
Absentee	45	0.18
Tendered	138	0.54
Total	25,610	100.00
Source: Central Election Commission of Bosnia and Herzegovina.

== Government formation ==
Viktor Lasić (HDZ BiH) was prime minister before the election. After the election, Zvonko Jurišić of HSP BiH headed a government supported by Croat Unity, HSP and NSRzB, while HDZ BiH moved into opposition.
