= 1998 West Herzegovina parliamentary election =

Cantonal election in Bosnia and Herzegovina

- 12–13 September 1998
- All 31 seats in the Assembly of the West Herzegovina Canton; 16 seats needed for a majority
Party	Leader	Vote %	Seats	+/–
HDZ BiH	Vinko Zorić	81.27	26	−3
HSP	Branko Boras	10.73	3	+1
HKDP	Ante Paponja	2.35	1	+1
NHI–HKDU	Mladen Kraljević	1.65	1	+1
This lists parties that won seats. See the complete results below.
Prime Minister before	Prime Minister after
Bariša Čolak; HDZ BiH	Bariša Čolak; HDZ BiH

The 1998 West Herzegovina parliamentary election was held on 12–13 September 1998 to elect all 31 members of the Assembly of the West Herzegovina Canton in West Herzegovina Canton, one of the ten cantons of the Federation of Bosnia and Herzegovina. It was part of the 1998 Bosnian general election, supervised by the Organization for Security and Co-operation in Europe (OSCE).

The Croatian Democratic Union of Bosnia and Herzegovina (HDZ BiH) won 81.27% of valid votes and 26 seats, securing an absolute majority. The published list of elected candidates records 31 members.

== Results ==
The vote summary records 10 parties or lists and 34,546 ballots cast; 33,504 were valid, and 1,042 were invalid.

Seat changes are measured against the certified 1996 allocation.

Election results
Party or list	Votes	%	Seats	Change from 1996
HDZ BiH	27,230	81.27	26	−3
HSP	3,595	10.73	3	+1
HKDP	788	2.35	1	+1
NHI–HKDU	552	1.65	1	+1
KCD	442	1.32	0	0
HČSP BiH	387	1.16	0	0
HNZ	296	0.88	0	0
SDP BiH	163	0.49	0	0
BHHČSP	41	0.12	0	0
BOSS	10	0.03	0	0
Total	33,504	100.00	31	0
Sources: Central Election Commission of Bosnia and Herzegovina (archived OSCE results).

Ballot status
Category	Ballots	% of ballots cast
Valid ballots	33,504	96.98
Invalid ballots	1,042	3.02
Total ballots cast	34,546	100.00
Source: Central Election Commission of Bosnia and Herzegovina (archived OSCE results).

== Elected members ==
The following members appear in the list published on 30 October 1998.

Published elected-member list
Party or list	Members
HDZ BiH	Vinko Zorić, Vladimir Šoljić, Ruža Bošnjak, Vice Majić, Zdravko Bešlić, Anka Ćesić, Petar Majić, Velimir Mabić, Mirjana Lasić, Ivan Leko, Ante Alilović, Marinko Bakula, Zdenko Primorac, Stjepan Nosić, Ivan Bago, Marinko Sosa, Marinko Gilja, Zdenko Ćosić, Mladen Šimić, Mladen Nižić, Miro Kovač, Radojko Nižić, Miljenko Lasić, Marko Šantić, Jerko Bazina, Jozo Jurić
HSP	Branko Boras, Dragan Vrdoljak, Snježana Mitar
HKDP	Ante Paponja
NHI–HKDU	Mladen Kraljević
Source: Central Election Commission of Bosnia and Herzegovina (archived OSCE results).

== Government formation ==
Bariša Čolak headed the cantonal government before the election and remained prime minister until 1999.
