= 1998 Canton 10 parliamentary election =

Cantonal election in Bosnia and Herzegovina

- 12–13 September 1998
- All 30 seats in the Assembly of Canton 10; 16 seats needed for a majority
Party	Leader	Vote %	Seats	+/–
HDZ BiH	Draško Brnić	59.23	18	+5
KCD (Note: The KCD coalition is compared with the combined 1996 allocation of its constituent parties: two seats won by SDA. Its other constituent parties won no seats in the canton in 1996.)	Sead Hadžijahić	12.77	4	+2
SDRSBiH	Mile Marčeta	7.20	2	+2
SP		6.12	2	+2
HSP	Ivan Miloloža	4.59	1	+1
NHI–HKDU	Željka Tičinović	4.53	1	+1
HSS BiH	Ante Čolak	1.85	1	+1
SDP BiH	Tihomir Ćurak	1.57	1	+1
This lists parties that won seats. See the complete results below.
Prime Minister before	Prime Minister after
Filip Andrić; HDZ BiH	Mirko Mihaljević; HDZ BiH

The 1998 Canton 10 parliamentary election was held on 12–13 September 1998 to elect all 30 members of the Assembly of Canton 10 in Canton 10, one of the ten cantons of the Federation of Bosnia and Herzegovina. It was part of the 1998 Bosnian general election, supervised by the Organization for Security and Co-operation in Europe (OSCE).

The Croatian Democratic Union of Bosnia and Herzegovina (HDZ BiH) won 59.23% of valid votes and 18 seats, securing an absolute majority. The published list of elected candidates records 30 members.

== Results ==
The vote summary records 13 parties or lists and 38,850 ballots cast, of which 35,932 were valid and 2,918 were invalid.

The seat-allocation document lists Socijaldemokrati RS i BiH under DA BiH and SDP BiH under BH Alijansa. The table below uses those allocations, matching the vote summary and elected-candidate list.

Seat changes are measured against the certified 1996 allocation. That allocation covered 15 seats; constitutional amendments published on 13 December 1996 subsequently set the Assembly's size at 30 members.

Final results
Party or list	Votes	%	Seats	Change from 1996
HDZ BiH	21,281	59.23	18	+5
KCD	4,588	12.77	4	+2
SDRSBiH	2,586	7.20	2	+2
SP	2,198	6.12	2	+2
HSP	1,650	4.59	1	+1
NHI–HKDU	1,628	4.53	1	+1
HSS BiH	666	1.85	1	+1
SDP BiH	563	1.57	1	+1
SSS	462	1.29	0	0
HČSP BiH	112	0.31	0	0
SLS RS	105	0.29	0	0
KC	59	0.16	0	0
SPP BiH	34	0.09	0	0
Total	35,932	100.00	30	+15
Sources: Central Election Commission of Bosnia and Herzegovina (archived OSCE results).

Ballot status
Category	Ballots	% of ballots cast
Valid ballots	35,932	92.49
Invalid ballots	2,918	7.51
Total ballots cast	38,850	100.00
Source: Central Election Commission of Bosnia and Herzegovina (archived OSCE results).

== Elected members ==
The following members appear in the list published on 30 October 1998.

Published elected-member list
Party or list	Members
HDZ BiH	Draško Brnić, Mario Bagarić, Ilija Šljivić, Ile Krezo, Zlatan Čivčija, Marija Jurčević, Zdravka Gelo, Miroslava Vukoja, Anto Omazić, Ivan Madunić, Dragan Bagarić, Stipe Barun, Ivan Markić, Tihomir Marinčić, Drago Mršo, Vladimir Jurčević, Petar Kalinić, Drago Stanić
Coalition for a United and Democratic Bosnia and Herzegovina (KCD)	Sead Hadžijahić, Munib Huseinagić, Dunja Dilaver, Mensura Korić
SDRSBiH	Mile Marčeta, Ratko Bajić
SP	Bogdan Košpić, Slavka Pantoš
HSP	Ivan Miloloža
NHI–HKDU	Željka Tičinović
HSS BiH	Ante Čolak
SDP BiH	Tihomir Ćurak
Source: Central Election Commission of Bosnia and Herzegovina (archived OSCE results).

== Government formation ==
On 14 December 1998, the Assembly elected Ivan Ivić as cantonal governor. Ivić appointed Mirko Mihaljević as prime minister, and the Assembly confirmed the appointment that day. The outgoing prime minister, Filip Andrić, was dismissed when his mandate expired.
