= 2010 Bosnian general election =

- 3 October 2010
- Turnout: 56.57% (presidential) ▲1.26 pp 56.53% (parliamentary) ▲1.17 pp
- Bosniak member of the Presidency
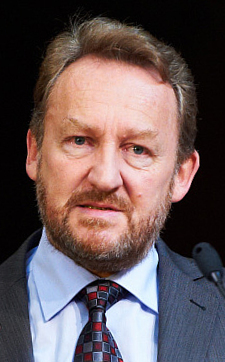

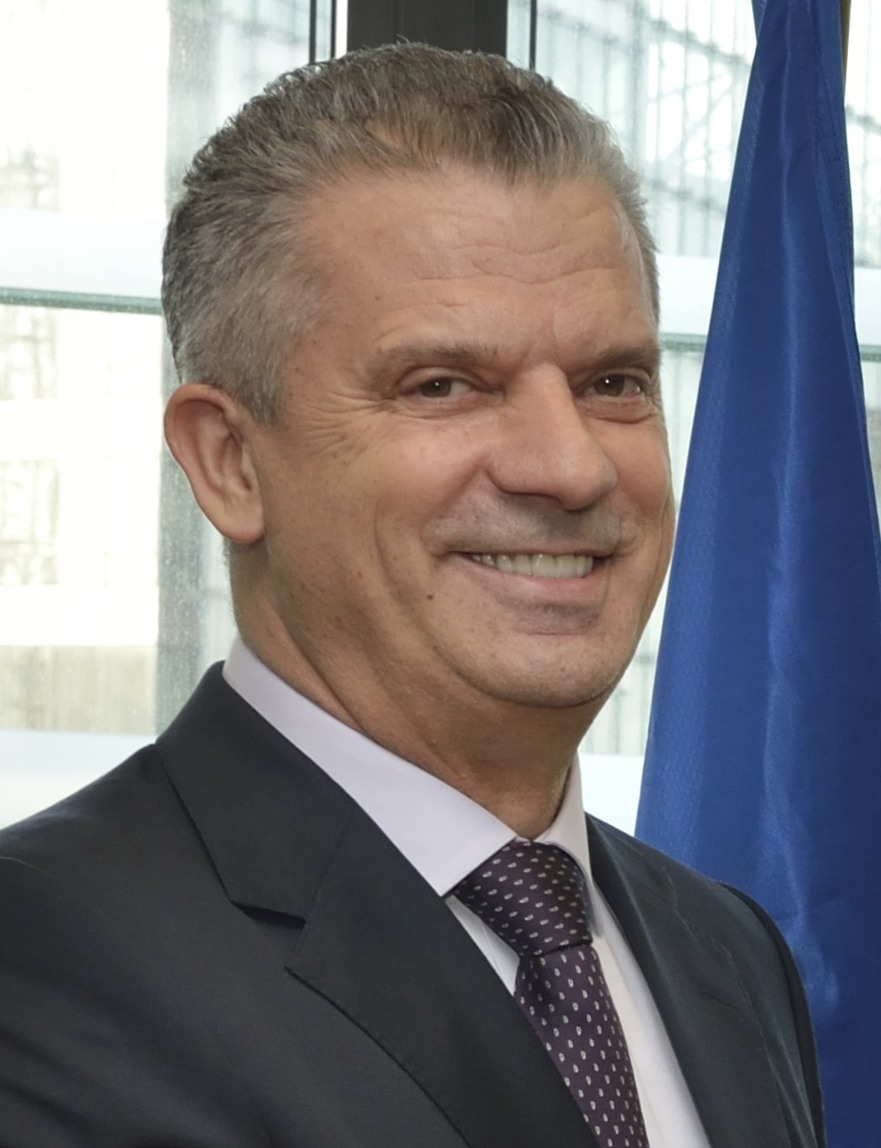
Candidate	Bakir Izetbegović	Fahrudin Radončić
Party	SDA	SBB
Popular vote	162,831	142,387
Percentage	34.86%	30.49%
- Results by municipality for the Bosniak member of the Presidency
- Croat member of the Presidency
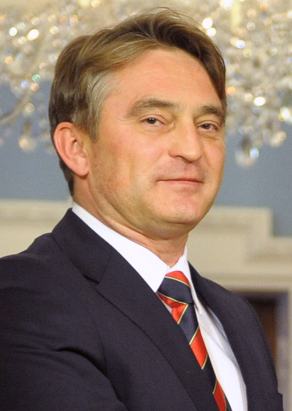

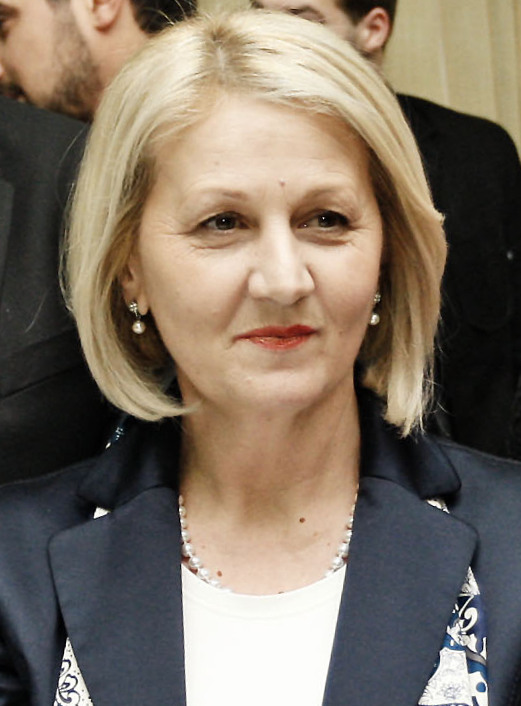
Candidate	Željko Komšić	Borjana Krišto
Party	SDP BiH	HDZ BiH
Popular vote	337,065	109,758
Percentage	60.61%	19.74%
- Results by municipality for the Croat member of the Presidency
- Serb member of the Presidency
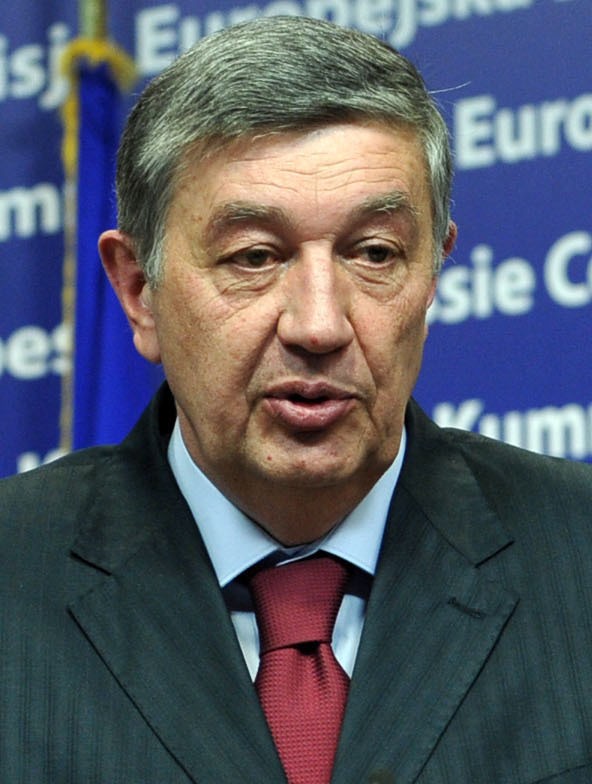

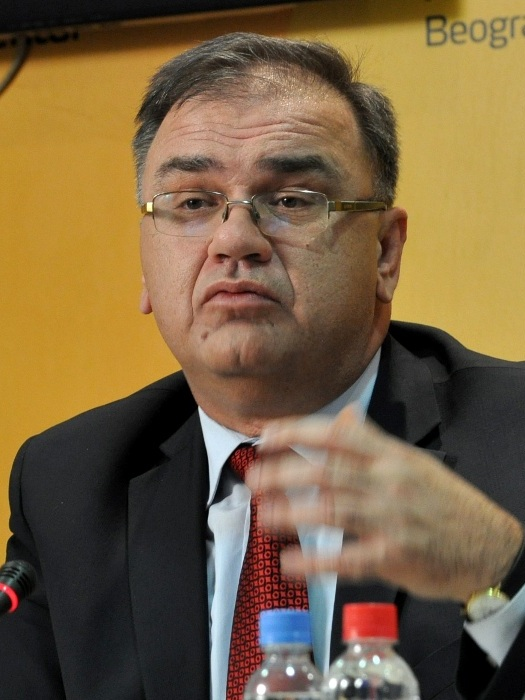
Candidate	Nebojša Radmanović	Mladen Ivanić
Party	SNSD	PDP
Popular vote	295,629	285,951
Percentage	48.92%	47.31%
- Results by municipality for the Serb member of the Presidency
Presidency members before election
Haris Silajdžić (Bosniak)
Željko Komšić (Croat)
Nebojša Radmanović (Serb)
Elected Presidency members
Bakir Izetbegović (Bosniak)
Željko Komšić (Croat)
Nebojša Radmanović (Serb)
- House of Representatives
- All 42 seats in the House of Representatives; 22 seats needed for a majority
Party	Leader	Vote %	Seats	+/–
SDP BiH	Zlatko Lagumdžija	17.33	8	+3
SNSD	Milorad Dodik	16.92	8	+1
SDA	Sulejman Tihić	13.05	7	−2
SDS	Mladen Bosić	8.40	4	+1
SBB	Fahrudin Radončić	7.95	4	New
HDZ BiH	Dragan Čović	6.97	3	0
SBiH	Haris Silajdžić	5.28	2	−6
HK	Zvonko Jurišić & Božo Ljubić	3.05	2	0
NSRzB	Mladen Ivanković-Lijanović	2.99	1	0
PDP	Mladen Ivanić	2.44	1	0
DNS	Marko Pavić	1.81	1	0
DNZ	Fikret Abdić	0.92	1	0
This lists parties that won seats. See the complete results below.

Chairman before	Chairman after
Nikola Špirić; SNSD	Vjekoslav Bevanda; HDZ BiH

General elections were held in Bosnia and Herzegovina on 3 October 2010. They decided the makeup of Bosnia and Herzegovina's Presidency as well as national, entity, and cantonal governments.

The elections for the House of Representatives were divided into two; one for the Federation of Bosnia and Herzegovina and one for Republika Srpska. In the presidential election, voters in the Federation elected Bosniak Bakir Izetbegović and re-elected Croat Željko Komšić, while voters in Republika Srpska re-elected Serb Nebojša Radmanović. The Social Democratic Party and the Alliance of Independent Social Democrats emerged as the largest parties in the House of Representatives, each winning 8 of the 42 seats.

== Background ==
After the Bosnian War and the Dayton Agreement that ended the war, the constitution set out, in Article V, a tripartite rotational Presidency between the Bosniak, Croat and Serb entities. Each Presidency member serves a four-year term, with the Chairman of the Presidency rotation every 8 months, with the first chairman being the one with most votes in the election.

== Candidates ==
=== Presidency ===
There were three candidates for the Bosniak member of the Presidency: the incumbent Haris Silajdžić, of Party for Bosnia and Herzegovina, the owner of Dnevni avaz Fahrudin Radončić, of the Union for a Better Future and Bakir Izetbegović of the Party of Democratic Action and the son of Alija Izetbegović, the founding president of Bosnia and Herzegovina.

The Croat candidate was: incumbent Željko Komšić from the Social Democratic Party, who was elected in 2006 when large numbers of Bosniaks voted for him rather than voting for a Bosniak candidate.

The Serb candidate was: incumbent Nebojša Radmanović of the Alliance of Independent Social Democrats, who was expected to win.

== Campaign ==
Following the International Court of Justice's opinion that Kosovo's declaration of independence did not violate international law Republika Srpska's Prime Minister Milorad Dodik said there would be repercussions in Bosnia and Herzegovina and that the issue would be discussed in depth after the elections. During his campaign Dodik reiterated support for the secession of Republika Srpska from Bosnia and Herzegovina and denied that the massacre in Srebrenica constituted a genocide. Boris Tadić, president of Serbia, expressed his support for Dodik, Tadić stated that he was "here to support my friends who run RS in the best possible way". He was later criticised by the SDA for supporting "a man who openly denies genocide in Srebrenica and calls for secession of Republika Srpska."

The Croat and Bosniak candidates were "strong supporters of a unified Bosnia," while Serb candidate advocated the separation of the Bosnian Serbs entity from the rest of the country. Dodik asserted that "Only the Serb Republic is self-sustaining, Bosnia-Herzegovina is not." He had a "strategic partnership" with the Croat nationalist Dragan Čović to support each other's calls for greater independence or autonomy as the Croatian side advocated. The Bosniaks, however, said would fight for a united Bosnia, and sought a stronger federal government - a key condition for European Union membership.

These polls were described as the most crucial since the civil war as a lot of campaigning focused on ethnic nationalism and voting for candidates of the same ethnicity. One political analyst, compared this campaign to that of 1990, before the breakup of Yugoslavia, when Bosnia had the choice of becoming a part of greater Serbia or an independent multi-ethnic country pointed out that "for exactly 20 years we have been spinning around in the same political pattern."

The official campaign started on 3 September, and lasted for next 30 days. Hate speech in the election campaign in BiH has become a normal occurrence. Because of that, Central Election Commission announced that they will not tolerate any form of hate speech. Nervousness of political parties was manifested through the violation of the Election Law of BiH, and particularly through the manipulation of so-called public opinion research and publication in the form of paid advertising. The first phase of the media war waged mainly through portals and news releases.

The campaign was significant because politicians were allowed to "use all their weapons" in publicity. Experts stated that this campaign was something new in Bosnia and Herzegovina because it was creative as opposed to the earlier campaigns.

- Our Party (NS) - Election campaign of the coalition of the Our Party and New Socialist Party - Zdravko Kršmanović started on 3 September by laying a wreath at the memorial area of Donja Gradina, at the Jasenovac concentration camp.
- Serb Democratic Party (SDS) - They started their election campaign with advertisements and election rallies in Banja Luka.
- Alliance of Independent Social Democrats (SNSD) - SNSD started election campaign at noon of 3 September on Squer of Krajina in Banja Luka with symbolic sticking of their first propaganda poster. President of the SNSD and candidat for president of Republika Srpska Milorad Dodik and president of executive board of SNSD and candidate for member of Presidency of Bosnia and Herzegovina Nebojša Radmanović had stick that first propaganda poster.
- Croatian Democratic Union of Bosnia and Herzegovina (HDZ BiH) - President of the party, prof. dr. sc. Dragan Čović hung out with the most socially vulnerable members of population. He stated that his party wants to emphasize the social care for people of Bosnia and Herzegovina, especially between Croats. Candidate for memeer of Presidency of Bosnia and Herzegovina Borjana Krišto started her official campaign on 3 September from her birth town Livno. In the morning she laid a wreath at the Memorial Center in the Donji Rujani, and at noon she addressed to the citizens at King Tomislav's Square in Livno, then she hung out with the assembled multitude. At the presence of many citizens, friends and members of her family she stated that her start of election campaign is very symbolic because Livno is a Croatian town that "never lost a single battle". She also added that she will come back victorious and "...announce victory of the Croatian people."
- Union for a Better Future (SBB BiH) - At the first they of election campaign, supporters and sympathizers of the party had met at the Iftar in Gradačac. At this meeting they stated that they will win the elections because they will "probably win those who gaved fake hope to the people previous years". About 600 fasting persons welcomed the party's president and candidate for Bosniak member of the Presidency, Fahrudin Radončić. Large number of sympathizers waited Radončić at the entrance of "Europrof", where they later continued with Iftar.
- Croatian Party of Rights - Candidate for Prime Minister of Herzegovina-Neretva Canton Živko Budimir had opened his Election Campaign at midnight of 3 September. He talked to the police representatives and tour to the police patrols. Professor Petar Milić, president of the Main Department of Croatian Party of Rights of Bosnia and Herzegovina and candidate of Coalition of Croatian Democratic Union 1990 and Croatian Party of Rights for House of Representatives of Parliament of the Federation of Bosnia and Herzegovina started his campaign with the most sensitive part of Croats - the exiles.

== Opinion polls ==
Opinion polls suggested Dodik's "Alliance of Independent Social Democrats" would remain the largest Serb party, as well as the country as a whole. The "Social Democratic Party" of Zlatko Lagumdžija would be the largest party in the federation, followed by the "Party of Democratic Action."

An analyst at the "Why not?" NGO in Sarajevo suggested the elections importance was because "change will finally happen [...] because the ones who are in power now have proved they are not capable of leading the country and bringing the necessary reforms. Civil society has been very active about these elections and we hope this will have an impact." She said that if there were changes in the establishment ethnic relations would not be as tense. An August 2010 survey of 2,000 respondents by the National Democratic Institute. suggested that voters on both sides are tired of nationalist rhetoric and pessimistic about the future of Bosnia. 87 percent felt that nationalist parties are leading the country in the wrong direction. Respondents said politicians discussed nationalist issues too much, while employment and economic issues were not discussed enough. They thought that the biggest issue was unemployment, followed by corruption and crime.

== Results ==
In total, 3,126,599 citizens registered to vote. There were 5,276 polling centres: 4,981 regular, 145 for voting in absentia, 143 for voting in person and 7 at Bosnian embassies abroad. There were also 1,200 observers, including 485 international observers.

The Central Electoral Commission of Bosnia and Herzegovina ordered a recount of 66,138 votes that were declared void. This could change the victory of Nebojša Radmanović, candidate of the Alliance of Independent Social Democrats (SNSD), who won the Serb seat of the central presidency by a narrow margin of 9,697. Mladen Ivanić of the Party of Democratic Progress (PDP) lost by less than two percent.

=== Presidency ===
Candidate	Party	Votes	%
Bosniak member
Bakir Izetbegović	Party of Democratic Action	162,831	34.86
Fahrudin Radončić	Union for a Better Future	142,387	30.49
Haris Silajdžić	Party for Bosnia and Herzegovina	117,240	25.10
Ibrahim Đedović	Democratic People's Union	13,369	2.86
Mujo Demirović	Bosnian-Herzegovinian Patriotic Party	8,951	1.92
Ðemal Latić	Party of Democratic Activity	8,738	1.87
Ibrahim Spahić	Civic Democratic Party	6,948	1.49
Izudin Kešetović	Bosnian Party	4,228	0.91
Aida Jusić	Independent	2,347	0.50
Total		467,039	100.00
Croat member
Željko Komšić	Social Democratic Party	337,065	60.61
Borjana Krišto	Croatian Democratic Union	109,758	19.74
Martin Raguž	Croatian Coalition	60,266	10.84
Jerko Ivanković Lijanović	People's Party Work for Prosperity	45,397	8.16
Pero Galić	Independent	1,581	0.28
Mile Kutle	Independent	1,069	0.19
Ferdo Galić	Independent	975	0.18
Total		556,111	100.00
Serb member
Nebojša Radmanović	Alliance of Independent Social Democrats	295,629	48.92
Mladen Ivanić	Together for Srpska (PDP–SDS)	285,951	47.31
Rajko Papović	Union for a Democratic Srpska	22,790	3.77
Total		604,370	100.00
Valid votes		1,627,520	92.02
Invalid/blank votes		141,053	7.98
Total votes		1,768,573	100.00
Registered voters/turnout		3,126,599	56.57
Source: CEC

=== House of Representatives ===
Party	Votes	%	Seats	+/–
Social Democratic Party	284,435	17.33	8	+3
Alliance of Independent Social Democrats	277,819	16.92	8	+1
Party of Democratic Action	214,300	13.05	7	–2
Serb Democratic Party	137,844	8.40	4	+1
Union for a Better Future	130,448	7.95	4	New
Croatian Democratic Union	114,476	6.97	3	0
Party for Bosnia and Herzegovina	86,669	5.28	2	–6
Croatian Coalition	50,071	3.05	2	0
People's Party Work for Prosperity	49,050	2.99	1	0
Party of Democratic Progress	40,070	2.44	1	0
Democratic People's Alliance	29,658	1.81	1	0
Bosnian-Herzegovinian Patriotic Party	28,704	1.75	0	–1
Bosnian Party	19,441	1.18	0	0
Our Party–New Socialist Party	19,435	1.18	0	New
Party of Democratic Activity	18,005	1.10	0	New
Democratic People's Union	15,153	0.92	1	0
Democratic Party	15,057	0.92	0	New
Socialist Party	14,573	0.89	0	0
Serbian Radical Party "Dr. Vojislav Šešelj"	14,320	0.87	0	0
Party of the Penniless People	11,699	0.71	0	New
Pensioners' Party	11,158	0.68	0	0
Serbian Radical Party	10,483	0.64	0	0
Serb Progressive Party	8,636	0.53	0	New
Social Democratic Union	8,755	0.53	0	0
Croatian Peasant Party	8,096	0.49	0	0
National Democratic Party	6,692	0.41	0	0
Alliance for Srpska Democracy	4,911	0.30	0	New
Democratic Party of the Disabled	3,624	0.22	0	0
Party for the People	3,174	0.19	0	New
Turnaround Coalition (GDS–NEP)	2,451	0.15	0	0
LDS–EES E-5	2,305	0.14	0	0
Independents	57	0.00	0	New
Total	1,641,569	100.00	42	0
Valid votes	1,641,569	92.78		
Invalid/blank votes	127,678	7.22		
Total votes	1,769,247	100.00		
Registered voters/turnout	3,129,599	56.53		
Source: CEC

==== By entity ====
Party	Federation			Republika Srpska			Total seats
Party	Votes	%	Seats	Votes	%	Seats	Total seats
Social Democratic Party	266,023	26.07	8	18,412	2.96	0	8
Alliance of Independent Social Democrats	8,810	0.86	0	269,009	43.30	8	8
Party of Democratic Action	197,922	19.40	7	16,378	2.64	0	7
Serb Democratic Party				137,844	22.19	4	4
Union for a Better Future	124,114	12.16	4	6,334	1.02	0	4
Croatian Democratic Union	112,115	10.99	3	2,361	0.38	0	3
Party for Bosnia and Herzegovina	74,004	7.25	2	12,665	2.04	0	2
Croatian Coalition	49,549	4.86	2	522	0.08	0	2
People's Party Work for Prosperity	49,050	4.81	1				1
Party of Democratic Progress				40,070	6.45	1	1
Democratic People's Alliance	1,147	0.11	0	28,511	4.59	1	1
Bosnian-Herzegovinian Patriotic Party	28,102	2.75	0	602	0.10	0	0
Bosnian Party	19,224	1.88	0	217	0.03	0	0
Our Party–New Socialist Party	11,917	1.17	0	7,518	1.21	0	0
Party of Democratic Activity	17,634	1.73	0	371	0.06	0	0
Democratic People's Union	14,843	1.45	1	310	0.05	0	1
Democratic Party				15,057	2.42	0	0
Socialist Party				14,573	2.35	0	0
Serbian Radical Party "Dr. Vojislav Šešelj"				14,320	2.30	0	0
Party of the Penniless People	11,462	1.12	0	237	0.04	0	0
Pensioners' Party	11,158	1.09	0				0
Serbian Radical Party				10,483	1.69	0	0
Serb Progressive Party				8,636	1.39	0	0
Social Democratic Union	8,603	0.84	0	152	0.02	0	0
Croatian Peasant Party	3,522	0.35	0	4,574	0.74	0	0
National Democratic Party				6,692	1.08	0	0
Alliance for Srpska Democracy				4,911	0.79	0	0
Democratic Party of the Disabled	3,577	0.35	0	47	0.01	0	0
Party for the People	3,174	0.31	0				0
Turnaround Coalition (GDS–NEP)	2,053	0.20	0	398	0.06	0	0
LDS–EES E-5	2,290	0.22	0	15	0.00	0	0
Independents				57	0.01	0	0
Total	1,020,293	100.00	28	621,276	100.00	14	42
Valid votes	1,020,293	92.90		621,276	92.60		
Invalid/blank votes	78,009	7.10		49,669	7.40		
Total votes	1,098,302	100.00		670,945	100.00		
Source: CEC

=== By electoral unit ===
==== Federation of Bosnia and Herzegovina ====
Electoral Unit	SDP BiH	SDA	SBB	HDZ BiH	SBiH	HK	NSRzB	DNZ
1st	23.87	20.35	6.51	7.91	5.89	5.19	5.23	10.38
2nd	11.42	12.53	6.42	37.45	3.78	18.80	6.49	–
3rd	28.18	15.72	17.83	0.98	11.79	0.38	3.72	0.13
4th	23.98	22.58	14.06	11.65	7.27	3.87	6.31	0.11
5th	35.91	22.26	11.13	6.51	5.78	2.23	2.87	–
Total	26.07	19.40	12.16	10.99	7.25	4.86	4.81	1.45
Source: izbori.ba

==== Republika Srpska ====
Electoral Unit	SNSD	SDS	PDP–NDP	DNS
1st	49.02	15.16	7.78	6.35
2nd	36.89	28.72	4.66	2.94
3rd	41.40	26.10	6.36	3.61
Total	43.30	22.19	6.45	4.59
Source: izbori.ba

== Entity Parliaments ==
=== Federation of Bosnia and Herzegovina ===
In the Federation this includes:

- Prime Minister of the FBiH
- House of Representatives of the FBiH
- House of Peoples of FBiH

==== House of Representatives of the Federation of Bosnia and Herzegovina ====
Party	Votes	%	Seats		
Party	Votes	%	Direct	Compensatory	Total
Social Democratic Party	251,053	24.53	20	8	28
Party of Democratic Action	206,926	20.22	17	6	23
Union for a Better Future	121,697	11.89	11	2	13
Croatian Democratic Union	108,943	10.64	10	2	12
Party for Bosnia and Herzegovina	78,086	7.63	8	1	9
People's Party Work for Prosperity	48,286	4.72	-	5	5
Croatian Coalition	47,941	4.68	4	1	5
Bosnian-Herzegovinian Patriotic Party	27,952	2.73	0	0	0
Party of Democratic Activity	19,254	1.88	1	0	1
Democratic People's Union	15,082	1.47	1	0	1
Bosnian Party	14,592	1.43	0	0	0
Pensioner's Party	13,850	1.35	0	0	0
Kokuz Party	13,340	1.30	0	0	0
Our Party–New Socialist Party	13,029	1.27	0	0	0
Alliance of Independent Social Democrats	9,505	0.93	1	0	1
Social Democratic Union	7,925	0.77	0	0	0
Croatian Peasant Party–New Croatian Initiative	5,725	0.56	0	0	0
Party for the People	4,239	0.41	0	0	0
LDS–EES E-5	3,384	0.33	0	0	0
Turnaround Coalition (GDS–NEP)	3,337	0.33	0	0	0
Democratic Party of the Disabled	2,780	0.27	0	0	0
Party of the United Independent Democrats	2,644	0.26	0	0	0
Right Way Party	1,875	0.18	0	0	0
Democratic People's Alliance	1,236	0.12	0	0	0
Croatian Party of Rights "Dr. Ante Starčević"	795	0.08	0	0	0
Socialist Party	53	0.01	0	0	0
Total	1,023,529	100.00	73	25	98
Valid votes	1,023,529	93.21			
Invalid/blank votes	74,542	6.79			
Total votes	1,098,071	100.00			
Source: CEC

==== Canton Parliaments ====
All 289 seats in the assemblies of the cantons of the Federation of Bosnia and Herzegovina were up for election (Bosnian: skupština kantona, Croatian: sabor županije, Serbian Cyrillic: скупштина кантона).

Party	USK		PK		TK		ZDK		BPK		SBK		HNK		ZHK		KS		K10		Total
Social Democratic Party (SDP)	21,104	23.38	816	5.24	56,188	30.77	35,724	25.41	2,682	24.48	16,285	17.33	9,005	13.47	252	0.74	42,692	24.19	990	4.13	186,015
Party of Democratic Action (SDA)	20,902	23.16	1,602	10,29	45,058	24,68	35,144	25.00	2,509	22.90	16,764	17.84	9,927	14.85	0	0	31,459	17.82	1,130	4.72	164,218
Party for Bosnia and Herzegovina (SBiH)	7,280	8.07	452	2.92	14,995	8.21	12,055	8.57	1628	14.86	6,621	7.05	2,634	3.94	0	0	18,213	10.32	213	0.89	64,091
Party of Democratic Activity (A-SDA)	11,019	12.21	0	0	4,303	2.36	1,822	1.30	201	1.83	555	0.59	60	0.09	0	0	1,726	0.98	0	0	19,686
Union for a Better Future (SBB BiH)	6,438	7.13	512	3.29	19,088	10.45	18,110	12.88	1,383	12.62	12,207	12.99	4,953	7.41	0	0	30,619	17.35	304	1.27	93,614
Croatian Democratic Union of Bosnia and Herzegovina (HDZ BiH)	591	0.65	6,413	41.19	5,627	3.08	7,330	5.21	0	0	20,417	21.73	22,623	33.83	17,526	51.65	1,846	1.05	6,247	26.09	88,620
Liberal Democratic Party (LDS)	0	0	0	0	0	0	369	0.26	33	0.30	157	0.17	63	0.09	0	0	1,536	0.87	0	0	2,518
Croatian Democratic Union 1990 (HDZ 1990)	527	0.58	3425	22.00	303	0.17	2,181	1.55	0	0	6,633	7.06	8,324	12.45	5,211	15.36	578	0.33	3,080	12.86	30,262
Croatian Party of Rights (HSP BiH)	7	0.01	454	2.92	*	*	*	*	0	0	*	*	3,235	4.84	4,358	12.84	*	*	2,284	9.54	10,338*
Croatian Peasant Party–New Croatian Initiative (HSS–NHI)	0	0	606	3.89	135	0.07	503	0.36	0	0	2,914	3.10	0	0	0	0	243	0.14	1,217	5.08	5,618
People's Party Work for Prosperity	4837	5.36	336	2.16	8,980	4.92	9,059	6.44	1,085	9.90	5,710	6.08	2,262	3.38	3,883	11.44	5,549	3.14	2,264	9.46	43,965
Democratic People's Alliance (DNS)	90	0.10	0	0	0	0	0	0	0	0	65	0.07	0	0	0	0	0	0	1,205	5.03	1,360
Bosnian-Herzegovinian Patriotic Party (BPS)	857	0.95	0	0	6,764	3.70	4,825	3.43	705	6.44	1,508	1.60	1,148	1.72	0	0	8,509	4.82	0	0	24,316
Democratic People's Union	11,844	13.12	0	0	0	0	250	0.18	0	0	0	0	5	0.01	7	0.02	196	0.11	32	0.13	12,334
Pensioners' Party of Bosnia and Herzegovina	655	0.73	60	0.39	1,674	0.92	2,912	2.07	145	1.32	924	0.98	524	0.78	458	1.35	3,095	1.75	0	0	10,447
Our Party (NS)	980	1.09	35	0.22	2,500	1.37	1,493	1.06	69	0.63	788	0.84	179	0.27	0	0	8,385	4.75	74	0.31	14,503
Bosnian Party (BOSS)	314	0.35	46	0.30	4,429	2.43	1,968	1.40	255	2.33	1,199	1.28	200	0.30	0	0	6,247	3.54	0	0	14,658
Social Democratic Union (SDU BiH)	889	0.98	0	0	4,501	2.47	164	0.12	0	0	362	0.39	0	0	0	0	6,019	3.41	89	0.37	12,024
Alliance of Independent Social Democrats	1,012	1.12	0	0	450	0.25	310	0.22	130	1.19	166	0.18	794	1.19	0	0	1,641	0.93	3,089	12.90	7,592
Others	914	1.01	-	-	-	-	-	-	-	-	-	-	-	-	-	-	-	-	-	-	

Source - Central Electoral Commission of Bosnia and Herzegovina

Party	USK	PK	TK	ZDK	BPK	SBK	HNK	ZHK	KS	K10	Total	+/-
Social Democratic Party (SDP)	8	1	13	10	7	6	5	-	10	1	61	+18
Party of Democratic Action (SDA)	7	2	10	10	6	6	5	-	7	2	55	-19
Croatian Democratic Union BiH (HDZ BiH)	-	8	1	2	-	7	10	13	-	7	48	+12
Union for a Better Future (SBB BiH)	2	1	4	5	3	4	3	-	7	-	29	-
Party for Bosnia and Herzegovina (SBiH)	3	1	3	4	4	2	2	-	4	-	23	-36
People's Party Work for Prosperity	2	-	2	3	3	2	1	3	1	3	20	+10
Croatian Democratic Union 1990 (HDZ 1990)	-	5	-	-	-	2	3	4	-	4	18	-11
Croatian Peasant Party–New Croatian Initiative	-	2	-	-	-	1	1	3	-	4	11	-3
Bosnian-Herzegovinian Patriotic Party (BPS)	-	-	2	1	2	-	-	-	2	-	7	-1
Party of Democratic Activity (A-SDA)	4	-	-	-	-	-	-	-	-	-	4	?
Democratic People's Union (DNZ)	4	-	-	-	-	-	-	-	-	-	4	-2
Alliance of Independent Social Democrats (SNSD)	-	-	-	-	-	-	-	-	-	3	3	-2
Bosnian Party/Social Democratic Union (BOSS/SDU)	-	-	-	-	-	-	-	-	2	-	2	-3
Our Party (NS)	-	-	-	-	-	-	-	-	2	-	2	?
Posavina Party (PS)	-	1	-	-	-	-	-	-	-	-	1	?
Democratic People's Alliance	-	-	-	-	-	-	-	-	-	1	1	?
Total	30	21	35	35	25	30	30	23	35	25		

== Reactions ==
Štefan Füle, European commissioner for enlargement and neighbourhood policy, urged Bosnian politicians to speed up the establishment of State and Entity governments using the EU agenda as a negotiation base for coalition building. Füle underlined the need for constitutional amendments to ensure compliance with the European Convention on Human Rights and improve governance, for a new Census Law to provide reliable statistical data, and for the establishment of an independent state aid authority.

The US Secretary of State Hillary Clinton visited Bosnia and Herzegovina a week after the elections in an effort to push for political reforms to fully integration the entry into both the European Union and NATO. She also called for unity and criticised threats of secession of Srpska made by Milorad Dodik. A US diplomat in Europe said he thought the reforms are necessary and that "the Bosnians need to follow up. The rest of the region is moving towards Europe, and Bosnia is going to have to overcome these ethnic divisions [...] if they want to go down this path."

In the international media, the election was read as seeing the country "still mired in political deadlock and ethnic rivalry," because of a continued political stalemate that leaves the unique tripartite presidency split over the future of the country. This also meant a likelihood of a delayed economic recovery and the accession of Bosnia and Herzegovina to the European Union.

== Analysis ==
Komšić's 2010 election results by municipality expressed as a percentage of total valid votes for each municipality. Note that the Bosniak and Croat members of the Presidency are elected from the Federation of Bosnia and Herzegovina entity, while the Serb member is elected from the Republika Srpska entity (greyed out on the map).

Many officials of the Croatian Democratic Union party have claimed that the re-election of Željko Komšić (SDP) as the Croat member of the presidency was due to Bosniaks choosing to vote on the Croat list. Bulk of the votes Komšić received came from predominantly Bosniak areas and he fared quite poorly in Croat municipalities, supported by less than 2,5% of the electorate in a number of municipalities in Western Herzegovina, such as Široki Brijeg, Ljubuški (0,8%), Čitluk, Posušje and Tomislavgrad, while not being able to gain not even 10% in a number of others. Furthermore, total Croat population in whole of Federation of Bosnia and Herzegovina is estimated around 495,000; Komšić received 336,961 votes alone, while all other Croat candidates won 230,000 votes altogether. Croats of Bosnia and Herzegovina consider him to be an illegitimate representative and generally treat him as a second Bosniak member of the presidency. This raised frustration among Croats, undermined their trust in federal institutions and empowered claims for their own entity or a federal unit, while opening so-called "Croatian question".

The Social Democratic Party of Zlatko Lagumdžija appeared to be the biggest winner of the election, while the Party of Democratic Action contained their expected losses, while the Party for Bosnia and Herzegovina of Haris Silajdžić lost ground. The Alliance of the Independent Social Democrats of Milorad Dodik strengthened its presence in both Republika Srpska and at state level. None of the newly established parties, with the exception of Fahrudin Radončić's Union for a Better Future were able to pass the threshold and gain seats in either of the parliamentary bodies. Two blocs can therefore be noticed at state level: the Alliance of the Independent Social Democrats and the Croatian Democratic Union on one side and the Social Democratic Party and the Party of Democratic Action on the other. The negotiations to form a new government at both Federation and State level are expected to take some time.

In Republika Srpska, Dodik secured a stable majority, and his election as Entity President will likely signal a trend of presidentialisation of Srpska's political system, in line with what happened in Serbia after Boris Tadić's presidential election.

== Aftermath ==
At the Federal level, the formation of government took place. There were two major coalitions which were formed after the election: Social Democratic Party, Party of Democratic Action, Croatian Party of Rights and People's Party Work for Betterment; and a looser grouping of the Alliance of Independent Social Democrats, Serb Democratic Party, Croatian Democratic Union and Croatian Democratic Union 1990.
