= 1996 West Herzegovina parliamentary election =

Cantonal election in Bosnia and Herzegovina

- 14 September 1996
- All 31 seats in the Assembly of the West Herzegovina Canton; 16 seats needed for a majority
Party	Leader	Vote %	Seats
HDZ BiH	Mariofil Ljubić	90.05	29
HSP	Ivan Ivo Spajić	6.70	2
This lists parties that won seats. See the complete results below.
Prime Minister before	Prime Minister after
Bariša Čolak; HDZ BiH	Bariša Čolak; HDZ BiH

The 1996 West Herzegovina parliamentary election was held on 14 September 1996 to elect all 31 members of the Assembly of the West Herzegovina Canton in West Herzegovina Canton, one of the ten cantons of the Federation of Bosnia and Herzegovina. It was part of the 1996 Bosnian general election.

The Croatian Democratic Union of Bosnia and Herzegovina (HDZ BiH) won 90.05% of valid votes and 29 seats. The Croatian Party of Rights (HSP) won the remaining two seats.

== Results ==
The certified results record 5 parties or lists and 55,519 ballots cast, of which 53,802 were valid and 1,717 were invalid.

Final results
Party or list	Votes	%	Seats
HDZ BiH	48,448	90.05	29
HSP	3,607	6.70	2
HČSP BiH	1,032	1.92	0
SDA	699	1.30	0
BOSS	16	0.03	0
Total	53,802	100.00	31
Source: Provisional Election Commission, as published in the Official Gazette of the Federation of Bosnia and Herzegovina.

Ballot status
Category	Ballots	% of ballots cast
Valid ballots	53,802	96.91
Invalid ballots	1,717	3.09
Total ballots cast	55,519	100.00
Source: Provisional Election Commission.

== Elected members ==
The following members are listed in the certified results signed on 16 October 1996.

Certified elected-member list
Party or list	Members
HDZ BiH	Mariofil Ljubić, Jozo Marić, Ivan Brkić, Velimir Jukić, Vladimir Šoljić, Ivan Paponja, Ivan Penava, Petar Majić, Jozo Jurić, Velimir Mabić, Radojko Nižić, Pero Kožul, Zdravko Bešlić, Marko Vukoja, Vice Majić, Ivo Zovko, Ivan Bago, Marinko Sosa, Miljenko Bandur, Slavko Kvesić, Zoran Vukšić, Danko Buhač, Ruža Bošnjak, Marinko Bakula, Darko Kondža, Marinko Kvesić, Mladen Nižić, Miroslav Matijević, Miro Kovač
HSP	Ivan Ivo Spajić, Mirko Paradžik
Source: Provisional Election Commission.

== Government formation ==
Bariša Čolak headed the cantonal government during the legislative term and remained prime minister until 1999.
