= List of heads of the West Herzegovina Canton =

Prime Minister of West Herzegovina Canton
- Premijer Zapadnohercegovačkog kantona
- Incumbent; Predrag Čović since 27 March 2023
- Appointer: West Herzegovina Cantonal Assembly
- Inaugural holder: Jozo Marić (as governor); Bariša Čolak (as prime minister)
- Formation: 27 March 1996

This is a list of heads of the West Herzegovina Canton.

== Heads of the West Herzegovina Canton (1996–present) ==
Croatian Democratic Union
Croatian Party of Rights

=== Governors ===
№	Portrait	Name (Born–Died)	Term of Office		Party
1		Jozo Marić (1948–)	27 March 1996	2000	HDZ BiH
2		Vinko Zorić (1961–)	2000	6 October 2002	HDZ BiH

=== Prime Ministers ===
№	Portrait	Name (Born–Died)	Term of Office		Party
1		Bariša Čolak (1956–)	27 March 1996	15 September 1999	HDZ BiH
2		Anđelko Mikulić (1959–)	15 September 1999	2003	HDZ BiH
3		Viktor Lasić (1968–)	2003	6 December 2006	HDZ BiH
4		Zvonko Jurišić (1961–)	6 December 2006	16 September 2010	HSP BiH
5		Zdenko Ćosić (1961–)	16 September 2010	27 March 2023	HDZ BiH
6		Predrag Čović (1969–)	27 March 2023	Incumbent	HDZ BiH
