= Kamena =

Kamena may refer to two villages in Bosnia and Herzegovina, formerly a single village:

- Kamena, Istočni Mostar, in Republika Srpska
- Kamena, Mostar, in the Federation of Bosnia and Herzegovina

It may also refer to the former German name for the village of Kamiana, formerly in Bukovina and now in Chernivtsi oblast, Ukraine
