= Zijemlje =

Zijemlje Зијемље
- Village
- Landscape of Zijemlje
- Interactive map of Zijemlje
- Location within Bosnia and Herzegovina
- Coordinates: 43°24′38″N 18°00′50″E
- Country: Bosnia and Herzegovina
- Entity: Republika Srpska
- Municipality: Istočni Mostar
- Time zone: UTC+1 (CET)
  - Summer (DST): UTC+2 (CEST)

Zijemlje (Serbian Cyrillic: Зијемље) is a village and the seat of Istočni Mostar municipality in Republika Srpska, Bosnia and Herzegovina.

== History ==
Zijemlje was part of the municipality of Mostar during the period of socialist Yugoslavia. During the Bosnian War (1992–1995), the area became part of the municipality known as Srpski Mostar, which was renamed Istočni Mostar in 2005.

The village is home to the Serbian Orthodox Church of the Holy Serbian New Martyrs (Храм Светих новомученика српских). On 1 September 2024, Bishop Dimitrije of the Eparchy of Zahumlje-Herzegovina celebrated the Divine Liturgy at the church.

Zijemlje also contains a war memorial commemorating fallen and missing soldiers of the Army of Republika Srpska from Mostar, Čapljina, and other communities throughout the Neretva Valley during the Bosnian War (1992–1995).

A traditional village gathering is also held on the first Sunday following the Dormition of the Mother of God. This annual gathering was described in 2017 as a tradition extending back more than a century.

== Geography ==
Zijemlje is situated on the northern foothills of Mount Velež, part of the Dinaric Alps in northern Herzegovina. The village lies at approximately 820 metres (2,690 feet) above sea level, within the Zijemlje field (Zijemaljsko polje), a highland area ranging from 800 to 850 metres in elevation.

The mountainous terrain contributes to cold, snowy winters. The surrounding landscape consists of grasslands, forests and agricultural land, with livestock farming and crop cultivation among the traditional economic activities.
