= Croatian Coalition (2010) =

Croatian Coalition Hrvatska koalicija
- Leader: Zvonko Jurišić Božo Ljubić
- Founded: 16 June 2010
- Dissolved: 17 March 2011
- Merger of: Croatian Party of Rights of Bosnia and Herzegovina Croatian Democratic Union 1990 Croat People's Union Croatian Union of Herzeg-Bosnia
- Headquarters: Mostar
- Ideology: Croatian nationalism Decentralisation
- Political position: centre-right
- Colours: red
- Slogan: Snaga zajedništva (Power of unity)
- Ethnic group: Croats

The Croatian Coalition (Croatian: Hrvatska koalicija) was the coalition of two Croat parties in Bosnia and Herzegovina, Croatian Democratic Union 1990 and Croatian Party of Rights of Bosnia and Herzegovina. This coalition was involved in 2010 Bosnia and Herzegovina general election where it ran for seats and parliament and presidential election.

In February 2010, president of the Croatian Party of Rights of Bosnia and Herzegovina, Zvonko Jurišić, signed a unity agreement with Croatian People's Union led by Milenko Brkić and Croatian Union of Herzeg-Bosnia led by Petar Milić in Mostar. According to this agreement all this party would act under one name - Croatian Party of Rights of Bosnia and Herzegovina.

At the election, this coalition won 49,524 votes, respectively 4,86% of Croat votes which gave them 4 out of 57 seats in Parliament of Bosnia and Herzegovina and 8 out of 156 seats in Parliament of Bosnia and Herzegovina.

The coalition ended in March 2011 when HDZ 1990 and HSP BiH split; HSP BiH entered in new coalition with Social Democratic Party of Bosnia and Herzegovina, Party of Democratic Action and People's Party Work for Betterment and formed a government of the Federation of Bosnia and Herzegovina.
