= Kamena, Mostar =

Kamena
- Village
- Location within Bosnia and Herzegovina
- Coordinates: 43°13′N 17°57′E
- Country: Bosnia and Herzegovina
- Entity: Federation of Bosnia and Herzegovina
- Canton: Herzegovina-Neretva
- Municipality: City of Mostar

Area
  - Total: 3.41 km^{2} (1.32 sq mi)

Population (2013)
  - Total: 0
  - Density: 0.0/km^{2} (0.0/sq mi)
- Time zone: UTC+1 (CET)
  - Summer (DST): UTC+2 (CEST)

Kamena is an abandoned village in the City of Mostar in Herzegovina-Neretva Canton of the Federation of Bosnia and Herzegovina, an entity of Bosnia and Herzegovina.

Prior to the Bosnian War, Kamena was part of Mostar, however, with the partition of Bosnia and Herzegovina after the Dayton Agreement in 1995, the village was divided, with the eastern part of the village being enjoined to the newly established Istočni Mostar, a part of the metropolitan area of Mostar that was assigned to Republika Srpska, while the western part of the village remained in Mostar. Today, Kamena is uninhabited.
