= Kokorina =

Coordinates: 43°16′19″N 18°01′28″E

Kokorina Кокорина
- Village
- Location within Republika Srpska
- Country: Bosnia and Herzegovina
- Entity: Republika Srpska
- Municipality: Istočni Mostar
- Time zone: UTC+1 (CET)
  - Summer (DST): UTC+2 (CEST)

Kokorina (Serbian Cyrillic: Кокорина) is a village in Istočni Mostar municipality, Republika Srpska, Bosnia and Herzegovina.
