= Kamena, Istočni Mostar =

Kamena Камена
- Village
- Location within Bosnia and Herzegovina
- Coordinates: 43°13′N 17°57′E
- Country: Bosnia and Herzegovina
- Entity: Republika Srpska
- Municipality: Istočni Mostar
- Time zone: UTC+01:00 (CET)
  - Summer (DST): UTC+02:00 (CEST)

Kamena (Serbian Cyrillic: Камена) is a village in the Municipality of Istočni Mostar in Republika Srpska, an entity of Bosnia and Herzegovina.

Prior to Bosnian War, Kamena was part of Mostar, however, with the partition of Bosnia and Herzegovina after the Dayton Agreement in 1995, the village was divided, with the eastern part of the village being enjoined to the newly-established Istočni Mostar, a part of the metropolitan area of Mostar that was assigned to Republika Srpska, while the western part of the village remained in Mostar.
