= Petar Milić =

Serbian footballer

Personal information
- Date of birth: 12 March 1998 (age 28)
- Place of birth: Belgrade, FR Yugoslavia
- Height: 1.85 m (6 ft 1 in)
- Position: Winger

Youth career
- Čukarički
- OFK Beograd

Senior career*
Years	Team	Apps	(Gls)
2015	OFK Beograd	1	(0)
2015	Bežanija	1	(0)
2016	Red Star Belgrade	0	(0)
2017	Angers II	3	(0)
2018	Čukarički	0	(0)
2018	OFK Beograd	0	(0)
2020	Kom Podgorica	6	(0)

International career
2014–2015	Serbia U17	5	(0)
- * Club domestic league appearances and goals

Petar Milić (Serbian Cyrillic: Петар Милић; born 12 March 1998) is a Serbian former professional footballer who played as a winger. He began his career at OFK Beograd. He retired at the end of the 2020 season with Montenegrin First League side FK KOM Podgorica.
