= King Tomislav Square (Livno) =

Central square in Livno, Bosnia and Herzegovina

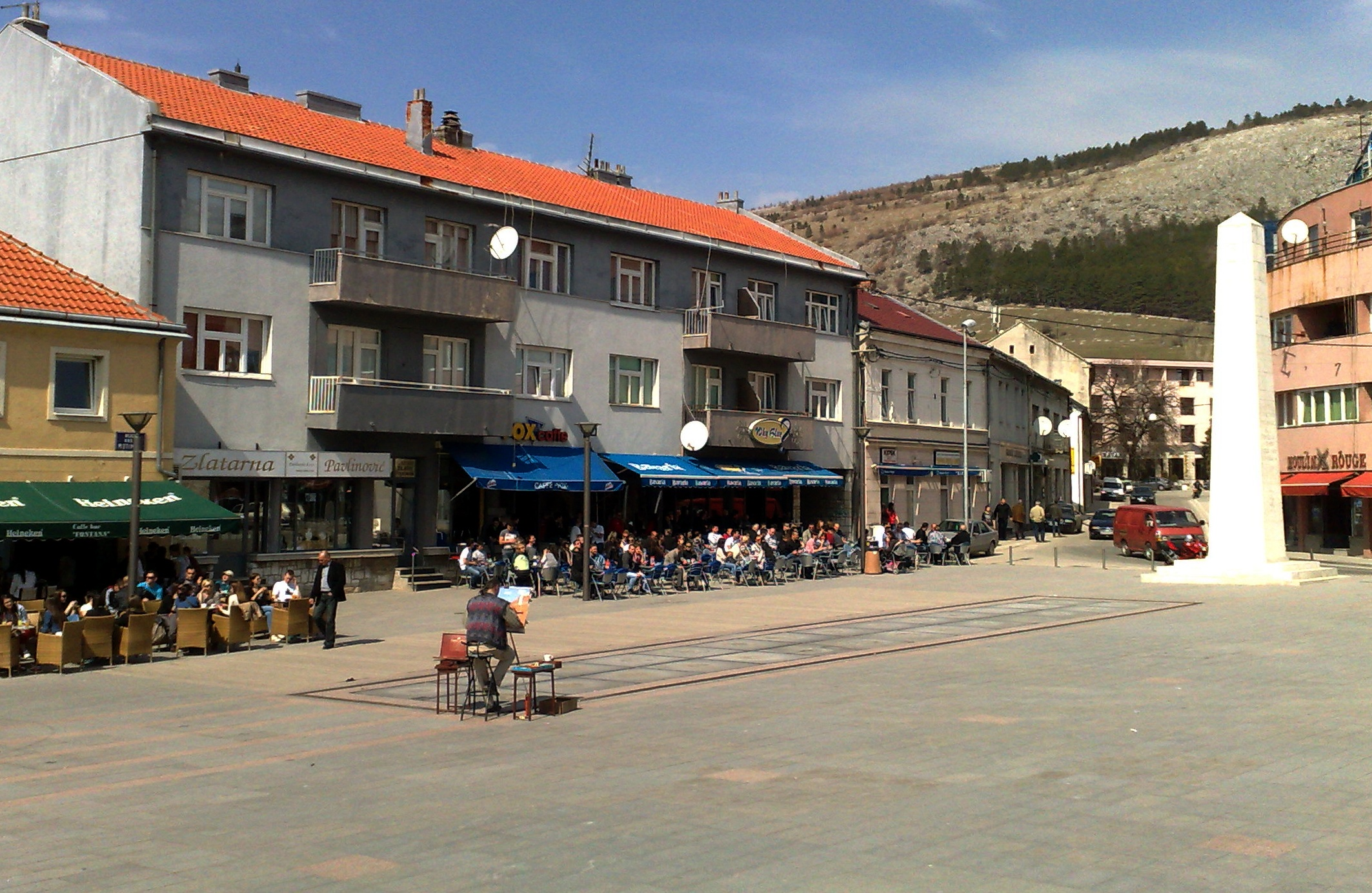
- Interactive map of King Tomislav Square
- Native name: Trg kralja Tomislava (Croatian)
- Former names: Stojan Platz; Trg Zrinskog; Trg maršala Tita
- Length: 42 m (138 ft)
- Width: 35 m
- Location: Livno
- Coordinates: 43.82597°N 17.00434°E

King Tomislav Square (Croatian: Trg kralja Tomislava) is the central square of the town of Livno and place of the obelisk in honor of the thousandth anniversary of the Kingdom of Croatia and the coronation of King Tomislav.

== History ==
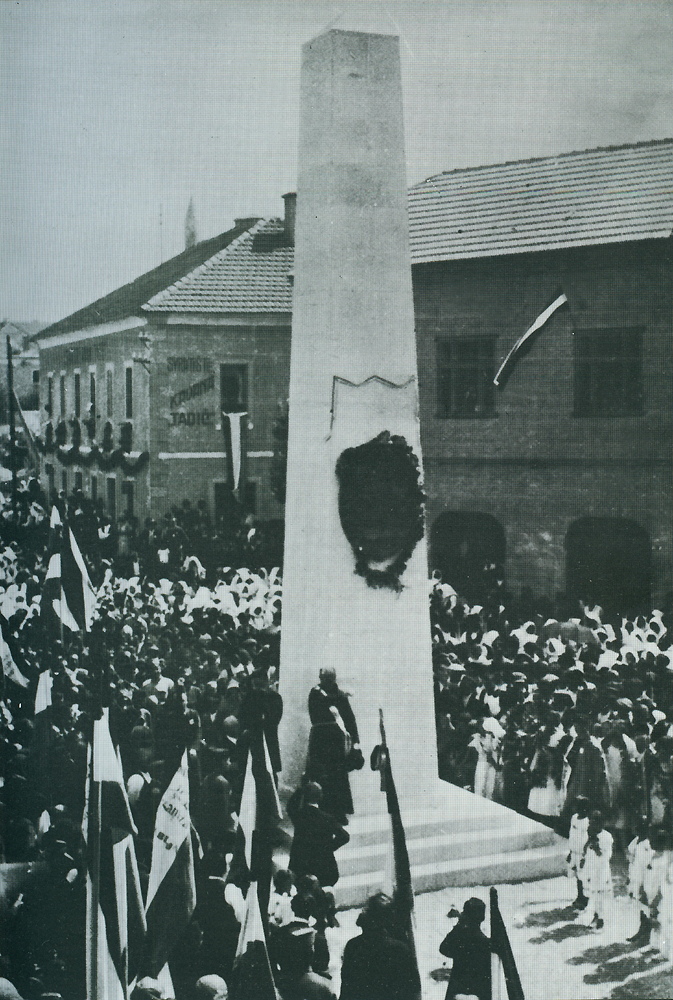
Ceremony of the unveiling of the monument on 5 September 1926

The area of the Square began to form in the 19th century. During the Ottoman rule in the area, among other things, were the houses and shops of the local merchant Jakov Jazvo and his sons. After the arrival of the Austro-Hungarian rule area of the intersection of Split Street (westwards) and Travnik Street (eastwards) was named Stojan Platz after the Austrian army officer France Stojan who fought in the battles around Livno. During the Kingdom of Serbs, Croats and Slovenes square was renamed Square of Zrinski (Trg Zrinskog) and Travnik Street and Split Street were renamed to Street of Zrinski and King Peter Street.

Obelisk as a monument to the thousandth anniversary of the Kingdom of Croatia and the King Tomislav was erected in 1926 in the northern part of the Square. On the obelisk there is relief image of King Tomislav and an inscription in Croatian: U spomen hiljadugodišnjice prvog hrvatskog kralja Tomislava (925–1925) podigoše Hrvati sela i grada Livna. (In the memory of the thousand anniversary of the first Croatian king Tomislav (925–1925), the Croats who built the village and the town of Livno.) After the construction of this monument square was renamed as King Tomislav Square
