= Zvonko Jurišić =

Member of the House of Representatives
- In office 30 November 2010 – 9 December 2014

Prime Minister of West Herzegovina Canton
- In office 6 December 2006 – 16 September 2010
- Preceded by: Viktor Lasić
- Succeeded by: Zdenko Ćosić

President of the Croatian Party of Rights of Bosnia and Herzegovina
- In office 5 May 2004 – 12 December 2015
- Preceded by: Office established
- Succeeded by: Stanko Primorac

Personal details
- Born: 15 October 1961 (age 64) Zagorje, Posušje, FPR Yugoslavia
- Party: Independent (2016–present)
- Other political affiliations: Croatian Party of Rights of Bosnia and Herzegovina (2004–2016) League of Communists of Yugoslavia (until 1990)
- Spouse: Tonka Jurišić
- Children: 4
- Education: University of Sarajevo
- Occupation: Politician
- Profession: Dentist

Zvonko Jurišić (born 15 October 1961) is a Bosnian Croat politician.

== Early life ==
Jurišić was born in Zagorje near the town of Posušje in Herzegovina. He attended the first 7 classes of elementary school in Posušje, and finished the eighth class in Mostar because his parents moved to Bijelo Polje. He finished Second High School in Mostar in 1980, and graduated from the Faculty of Dentistry at the University of Sarajevo in 1987.

== Medical career ==
He worked as a dentist in a hospital in Posušje from 1988 until 1992. In 1995 he became director of the Posušje hospital. He served as director until 1997. In 1999 he specialized in oral surgery in Mostar and Zagreb. From 1999 until 2006 he led the dentist service. He owns Dental Practice "Dr. Zvonko Jurišić".

== Political career ==
In 1998, he joined the Croatian Party of Rights of Bosnia and Herzegovina. In 2000 he entered the Presidency of the Party and in 2004 he was named the party's president.

In the 2000 election he was candidate for the Assembly of the West Herzegovina Canton but he didn't enter the Assembly. From 2002 until 2006 he served as a member of the Assembly. On the general election held in 2002 he won 443 votes. At the presidential elections held in 2006 he won 20,350 votes; which wasn't enough for him to become president. In that year he was named Prime Minister of West Herzegovina Canton. On the general election held in 2010 he became a member of the Parliament of Bosnia and Herzegovina with 7,497 votes.

== Personal life ==
He is married to Tonka Jurišić and has four children, son Ivan and daughters Anđela, Antonija and Mia.

== Sources ==
- Biografija za Zvonko Jurišić. CIN. Retrieved 25 November 2011. (in Croatian)
