= Istočni Mostar =

Municipality in Bosnia and Herzegovina

Istočni Mostar Источни Мостар East Mostar
- Municipality
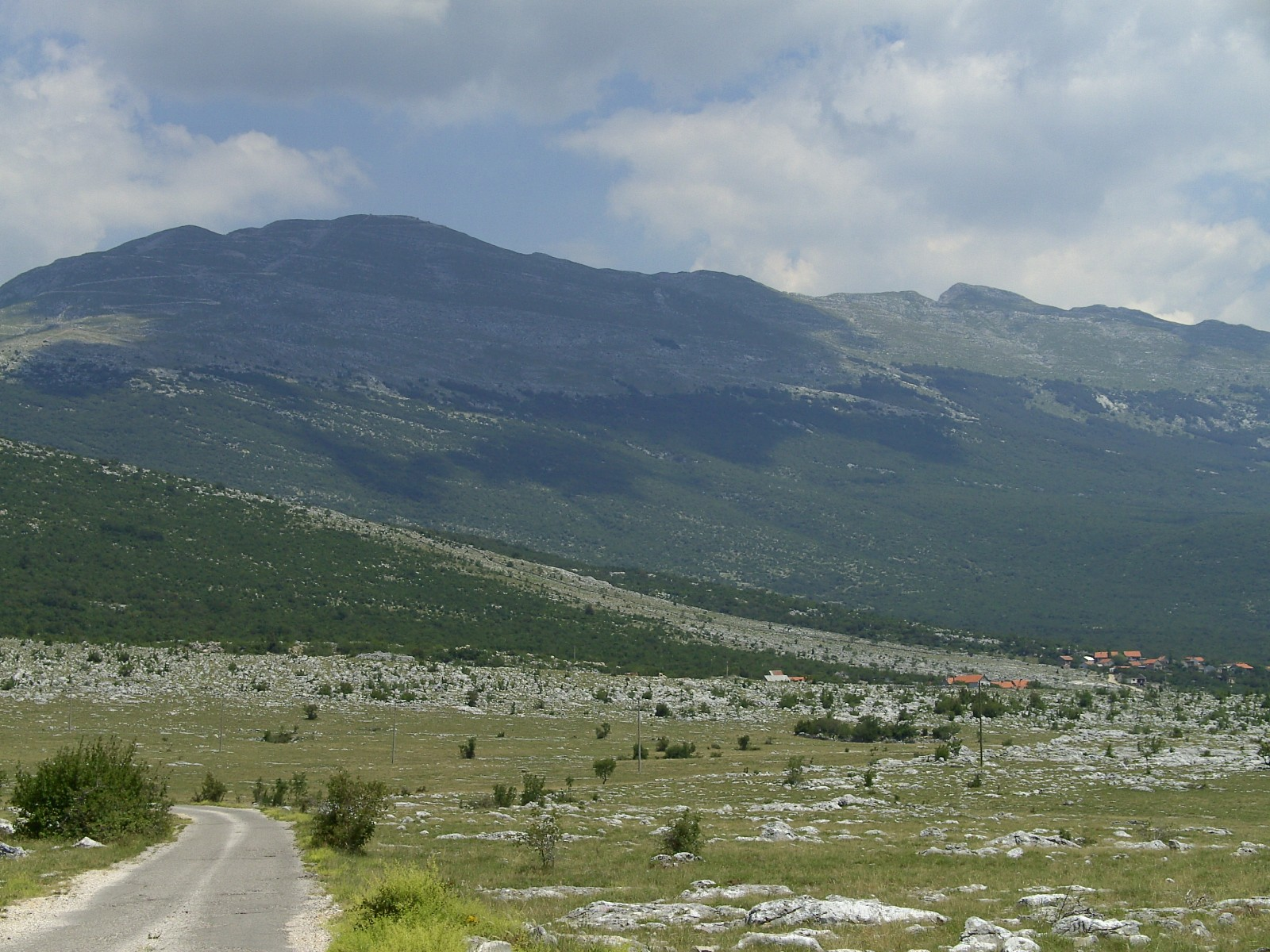
- Road in the municipality

- Location of Istočni Mostar within Bosnia and Herzegovina

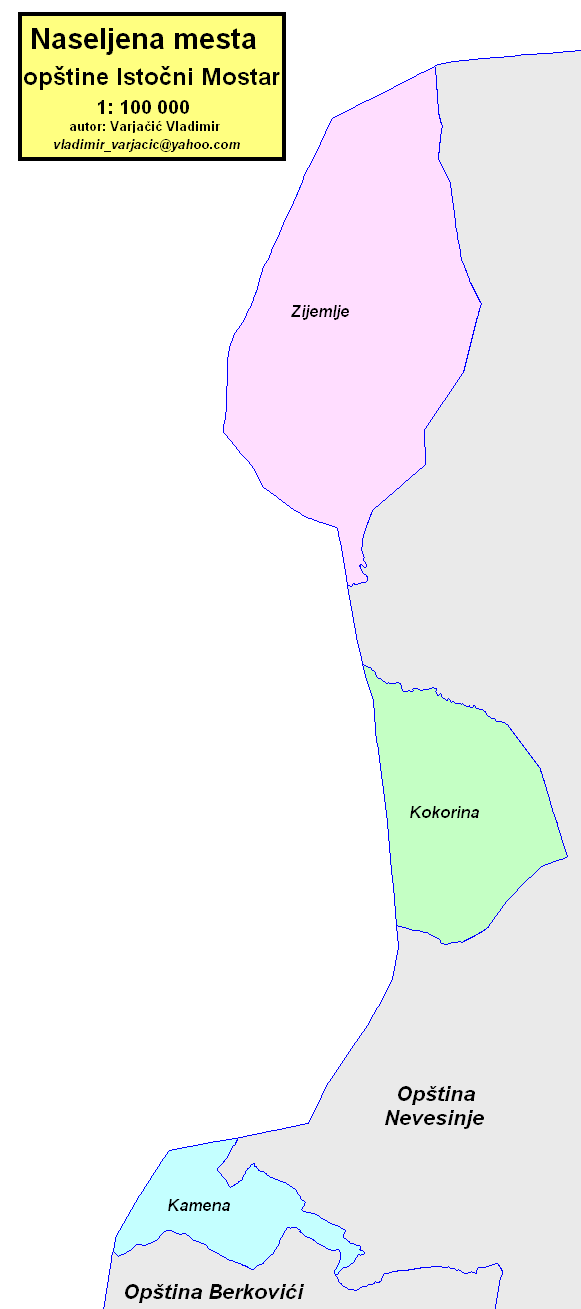
- Coordinates: 43°24′40″N 18°0′17″E
- Country: Bosnia and Herzegovina
- Entity: Republika Srpska
- Geographical region: Herzegovina

Government
  - Municipal mayor: Božo Sjeran (Ind.)

Area
  - Total: 85.24 km^{2} (32.91 sq mi)

Population (2013 census)
  - Total: 257
  - Density: 3.02/km^{2} (7.81/sq mi)
- Time zone: UTC+1 (CET)
  - Summer (DST): UTC+2 (CEST)
- Area code: 59

Istočni Mostar (Serbian Cyrillic: Источни Мостар, lit. 'East Mostar') is a municipality in Republika Srpska, Bosnia and Herzegovina. As of 2013, it has a population of 257 inhabitants.

== History ==
Istočni Mostar was created in 1995, following the end of the Bosnian War. It was known as Srpski Mostar (Serbian Cyrillic: Српски Мостар, lit. 'Serb Mostar') until 2004, after which it was renamed to its current name Istočni Mostar. It was created from the Serb-inhabited part of the pre-war municipality of Mostar which is now in the Herzegovina-Neretva Canton, Federation of Bosnia and Herzegovina.

The seat of municipality is in Zijemlje, with 187 inhabitants, most of whom are Serbs. The two other settlements are Kamena and Kokorina.

As of 2019, it is one of the smallest municipalities by number of inhabitants in Republika Srpska.

== Demographics ==
=== Population ===
Population of settlements – Istočni Mostar municipality
	Settlement	1991.	2013.
	Total	153	257
1	Istočni Mostar		244

=== Ethnic composition ===
Ethnic composition – Istočni Mostar municipality
	2013.	1991.
Total	257 (100,0%)	153 (100,0%)
Serbs	166 (64,59%)	96 (63,16%)
Bosniaks	78 (30,35%)	57 (37,50%)
Croats	11 (4,280%)	
Others	2 (0,778%)	

== Notable people ==
- Želimir Puljić (born 1947), Croatian Catholic archbishop
