= Bariša Čolak =

Bosnian Croat politician and lawyer (born 1956)

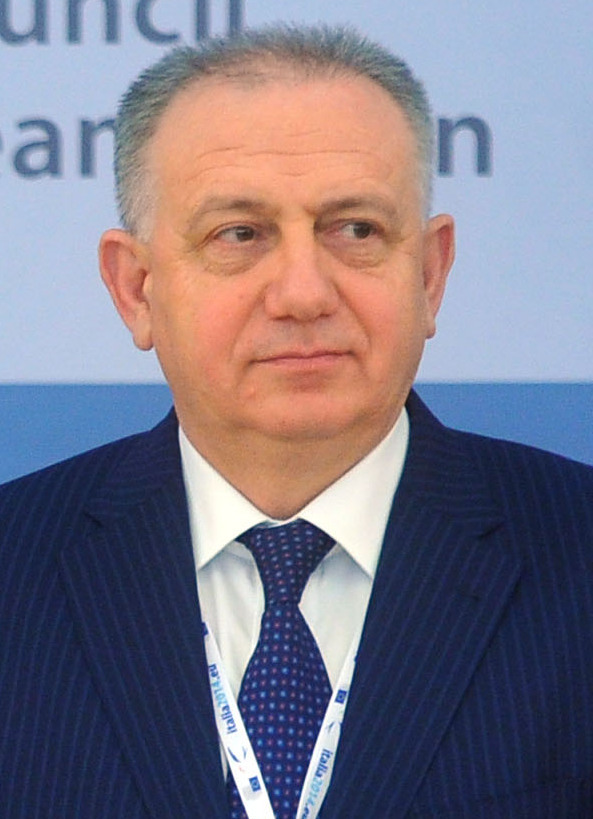
- Čolak in 2014

Minister of Justice
- In office 11 January 2007 – 31 March 2015
- Prime Minister: Nikola Špirić; Vjekoslav Bevanda
- Preceded by: Slobodan Kovač
- Succeeded by: Josip Grubeša

Minister of Security
- In office 23 December 2002 – 11 January 2007
- Prime Minister: Adnan Terzić
- Preceded by: Office established
- Succeeded by: Tarik Sadović

Federal Minister of Justice
- In office 15 September 1999 – 12 March 2001
- Prime Minister: Edhem Bičakčić; Dragan Čović (acting)
- Preceded by: Ignjac Dodik
- Succeeded by: Zvonko Mijan
Parliamentary offices
Member of the House of Peoples
In office 16 February 2015 – 16 February 2023
Member of the House of Representatives of Bosnia and Herzegovina
In office 2002–2006
Constituency	2nd Electoral Unit
Additional positions
President of the Croatian Democratic Union
In office 4 May 2002 – 5 June 2005
Preceded by	Ante Jelavić
Succeeded by	Dragan Čović
Prime Minister of West Herzegovina Canton
In office 27 March 1996 – 15 September 1999
Preceded by	Office established
Succeeded by	Anđelko Mikulić

Personal details
- Born: 1 January 1956 (age 70) Široki Brijeg, FPR Yugoslavia
- Party: Croatian Democratic Union
- Spouse: Anela Čolak
- Children: 3
- Education: University of Mostar

Bariša Čolak (born 1 January 1956) is a Bosnian Croat politician and lawyer who served as member of the national House of Peoples from 2015 to 2023. He previously served as Minister of Justice from 2007 to 2015.

Čolak was also Minister of Security from 2002 to 2007. He is a member and former president of the Croatian Democratic Union.

== Early life and education ==
Čolak was born on 1 January 1956 in Široki Brijeg, where he attended elementary and high school. He graduated from the Faculty of Law, University of Mostar in 1979. He also attended postgraduate studies on subject Bosnia and Herzegovina and European Law, but because of his duties as a minister, study was on halt.

== Early career ==
From 1979 to 1988, with a break from April 1980 to April 1981, Čolak worked as director of the constructional hardware "Metalac Lištica" which was part of the SOKO company in Mostar. From 1988 to the end of 1993, he worked as a judge in Lištica, renamed Široki Brijeg.

== Political career ==
Čolak joined the Croatian Democratic Union (HDZ BiH) in 1993. After that, until 1996, he was assistant of the Minister of Justice, Deputy Minister of Justice and later Minister of Justice of the Croatian Republic of Herzeg-Bosnia. After the war, from 27 March 1996 until September 1999, he was the first Prime Minister of West Herzegovina Canton.

Čolak was a member of the party's Municipal Board in Široki Brijeg and later member of the Cantonal Board of the West Herzegovina Canton and member of the Central Committee of the party. He was also repeatedly a member of the party's presidency.

In 1999, Čolak became the Federal Minister of Justice. In the 2000 parliamentary election, Čolak won 5,412 votes for a seat in the Federal Parliament, but he continued to be a minister in the Federal Government. From 2001 until 2002, Čolak was acting president of the HDZ BiH.

In the 2002 general election, Čolak won 16,721 votes and entered the Federal Parliament once again. He remained the party's president until 2005. In January 2003, he became the national Minister of Security and held that duty until 2007. On 11 January 2007, Čolak was named national Minister of Justice, serving until 31 March 2015. Following the 2014 general election, he was appointed member of the national House of Peoples. He served as member of the House of Peoples until February 2023.

== Personal life ==
Bariša is married to Anela Čolak; the couple have three children.

Party political offices
Preceded by Ante Jelavić	President of the Croatian Democratic Union; 2002–2005	Succeeded by Dragan Čović
Political offices
Preceded by Office established	Minister of Security; 2002–2007	Succeeded by Tarik Sadović
Preceded by Slobodan Kovač	Minister of Justice; 2007–2015	Succeeded by Josip Grubeša
