= New Croatian Initiative =

New Croatian Initiative Nova hrvatska inicijativa
- Founder: Krešimir Zubak
- Founded: 24 June 1998
- Dissolved: 1 October 2007
- Merged into: Croatian Peasant Party
- Headquarters: Mostar
- Ideology: Liberalism; Christian democracy; Croatian nationalism; Pro-Europeanism
- Political position: Centre to centre-right

The New Croatian Initiative (Croatian: Nova hrvatska inicijativa or NHI) was a Bosnian Croat political party in Bosnia and Herzegovina. It was founded by Krešimir Zubak in 1998, after he left the Croatian Democratic Union. The party was dissolved in 2007.

== History ==
The New Croatian Initiative was founded by former Bosnian Presidency member Krešimir Zubak on 24 June 1998, who had previously left the Croatian Democratic Union (HDZ BiH). The party consisted mainly of liberals, the majority of whom were dissidents from the HDZ BiH. Zubak believed that its leaders didn't care about the interests of Croats in Central Bosnia.

After several months of negotiations, on 1 October 2007, the party was merged into the Croatian Peasant Party.

== Elections ==
=== Parliamentary elections ===
Parliamentary Assembly of Bosnia and Herzegovina
Year	#	Popular vote	%	HoR	Seat change	HoP	Seat change	Government
1998 (Note: Run in coalition with the HKDU.)	7th	40,080	2.32	1 / 42	New	0 / 15	New	Opposition
2000	10th	23,604	1.58	1 / 42	0	1 / 15	▲1	Coalition
2002	14th	16,890	1.37	1 / 42	0	0 / 15	▼1	Opposition
2006 (Note: Run in coalition with the HSP.)	11th	24,415	1.73	0 / 42	▼1	0 / 15	0	Extra-parliamentary

=== Presidency elections ===
Presidency of Bosnia and Herzegovina
Election year	#	Candidate	Votes	%	Representing	Elected?
1998	3rd	Krešimir Zubak	40,880	11.42%	Croats	No
2002	3rd	Mijo Anić	16,345	8.77%	Croats	No
