= Croatian Peasant Party of Bosnia and Herzegovina =

Croatian Peasant Party of Bosnia and Herzegovina Hrvatska seljačka stranka Bosne i Hercegovine
- Abbreviation: HSS BiH
- President: Mario Karamatić
- Founded: 18 April 1993
- Headquarters: Kralja Tomislava 99, Mostar
- Ideology: Agrarianism; Croatian nationalism; Factions: Christian democracy; Social liberalism
- Political position: Centre (including centre-left and centre-right elements)
- National affiliation: Croatian Five
- International affiliation: Centrist Democrat International
- Colours
- HoR BiH: 0 / 42
- HoP BiH: 0 / 15
- HoR FBiH: 1 / 98
- HoP FBiH: 0 / 80

Website
- hss.ba

The Croatian Peasant Party of Bosnia and Herzegovina (Croatian: Hrvatska seljačka stranka Bosne i Hercegovine or HSS BiH) is a Croatian political party in Bosnia and Herzegovina.

Since the legacy and the brand of the historic Croatian Peasant Party (HSS) from the early 20th Century (led by Stjepan Radić and Vladko Maček) is popular and well-known, there have been couple of splinter groups and various parties in Bosnia and Herzegovina have a similar name, invoking HSS tradition.

== History ==
HSS BiH was found on 18 April 1993 as an effort led by Ivo Komšić and Napredak to create democratic opposition to HDZ policies.

HSS joined HDZ 1990 and other minor Croat parties to form "Croats Together" coalition, challenging HDZ in 2006 elections.

In 2007, HSS and the left-liberal New Croatian Initiative merged. The New Croatian Initiative was formed earlier as a splinter group from the Croatian Democratic Union of Bosnia and Herzegovina by Krešimir Zubak. The merger was originally named HSS-NHI. After HSS-NHI underwent turmoil and internal divisions grew, a division of former HSS members led by Ljiljana Lovrić left the party and reestablished Croatian Peasant Party of Bosnia and Herzegovina in 2010. Weakened HSS joined HDZ and other minor center-right parties in a coalition to contest 2010 elections, opposed to the Croatian Coalition.

In February 2017, party president Mario Karamatić said HSS will demand a reestablishment of Croatian Republic of Herzeg-Bosnia in its 1995 shape if the Republika Srpska secedes. Karamatić declared Croats have been "fooled" by the 1994 Washington Agreement that abolished Herzeg-Bosnia and established the Croat-Bosniak Federation, that this agreement was also broken numerous times and that Croats have the right to recede to the status quo ante, i.e., Herzeg-Bosnia. As far as the Herzeg-Bosnia's tentative territory, Karamatić proposed the area served by the electricity utility Elektroprivreda HZ HB, which covers most areas of Croat habitation.

In 2021, Karamatić described HSS as a party of the left from its foundation. In an interview, he talked about the anti-fascist and anti-communist sentiment of the party, while he also described it as highly socially aware. In 2007, party leader at the time Marko Tadić positioned the HSS-NHI party on the centre-left of the political spectrum, also pointing out its social character.

== Elections ==
=== 2006 ===
As a part of "Croats Together" coalition, HSS BiH won 1 seat in the House of Representatives and 2 out of 17 Croat seats in the House of Peoples of the Federation of Bosnia and Herzegovina.

=== 2010 ===
Part of HDZ-led coalition. No seats won.

=== 2014 ===
In the 2014 Bosnia elections, most of the parties participating in Croatian National Assembly's work (HDZ BiH, Croatian Peasant Party, HKDU BiH, HSP "dr. Ante Starčević" and HSP HB) formed a joint electoral coalition to contest the entity and state parliamentary elections as well as the elections for the Croat member of the state presidency. Coalition won 14 out of 17 Croat seats in the House of Peoples in Federation's Parliament and 4 out of 5 Croat seats in the State House of Peoples, together with 19 seats in Federation's and 14 in State House of Representatives, respectively. CPP's deputies formed a joint club with other parties from CNA Coalition's list. CPP's Mario Karamatić holds one of five Croat seats in the state House of Peoples.

== Splinter groups ==
- Croatian Peasant Party of Stjepan Radić (2010)
- District Brčko also has a distinct party, Croatian Peasant Party of Radić brothers.

== See also ==
- Croatian Peasant Party
