= Croatian Party of Rights of Bosnia and Herzegovina =

Croatian Party of Rights of Bosnia and Herzegovina Hrvatska stranka prava Bosne i Hercegovine
- Abbreviation: HSP BiH
- President: Nikola Raguž
- Secretary-General: Petar Milić
- Founder: Anto Đapić; Zvonko Jurišić
- Founded: 5 May 2004
- Headquarters: Kneza Mihajla Viševića Humskog 3, Mostar
- Newspaper: Starčević
- Youth wing: Youth of the Croatian Party of Rights of Bosnia and Herzegovina
- Ideology: Anti-Serb sentiment
- Political position: Far-right
- National affiliation: Croatian National Assembly
- Colours: Black
- Slogan: Uvijek vjerni Za dom spremni
- HoR BiH: 0 / 42
- HoP BiH: 0 / 15
- HoR FBiH: 0 / 98
- HoP FBiH: 0 / 80

The Croatian Party of Rights of Bosnia and Herzegovina (Croatian: Hrvatska stranka prava Bosne i Hercegovine or HSP BiH) is an extra-parliamentary party in Bosnia and Herzegovina. The party was established in 2004 as a splinter of the Croatian Party of Rights established in 1991, under the name Croatian Party of Rights Đapić-dr. Jurišić, named after its founders Anto Đapić and Zvonko Jurišić. In 2010, the main party dissolved, while the Croatian Party of Rights Đapić-dr. Jurišić usurped their name.

Currently, the party has one representative in the Cantonal Assembly of the West Herzegovina Canton.

== History ==
The Croatian Party of Rights of Bosnia and Herzegovina was originally established as a splinter party of the Croatian Party of Rights in 2004 and was named Croatian Party of Rights Đapić-dr. Jurišić, named after its founders, Anto Đapić, the president of the Croatian Party of Rights in Croatia and Zvonko Jurišić. In August 2005, the HSP BiH absorbed the Croatian Rights Bloc.

At the 2006 Bosnian general election, the HSP BiH was in a coalition with the New Croatian Initiative, gaining one representative in the House of Representatives of the Federation of Bosnia and Herzegovina, one representative in the Cantonal Assembly of Posavina Canton, two representatives of the Cantonal Assembly of the Herzegovina-Neretva Canton and four representatives in the Cantonal Assembly of the West Herzegovina Canton and the Canton 10.

In February 2010, the original HSP BiH ceased to exist, and the leaders of other two minor Croat parties, the Croatian People's Union and the Croatian Unity of Herzeg-Bosnia agreed to join the HSP BiH under the joint name, now usurped from the original party the Croatian Party of Rights of Bosnia and Herzegovina. The change was done by the Municipal Court in Mostar.

At the 2010 Bosnian general election, the HSP BiH was in a coalition with the Croatian Democratic Union 1990 (HDZ 1990). The HSP BiH gained one representative in the House of Representatives of Bosnia and Herzegovina, two representatives in the House of Representatives of the Federation of Bosnia and Herzegovina and one in the House of Peoples of the Federation of Bosnia and Herzegovina, one representative in the Cantonal Assembly of the Posavina Canton and the Herzegovina-Neretva Canton and three representatives in the Cantonal Assembly of the West Herzegovina Canton and the Canton 10.

After political turmoil, the HSP BiH agreed to form a coalition government with other Bosniak parties, excluding the Croatian Democratic Union of Bosnia and Herzegovina (HDZ BiH) and the HDZ 1990, their former coalition partners, who received most of the Croat votes. In March 2011, the HSP BiH's representative in the Cantonal Assembly of the Herzegovina-Neretva Canton Živko Budimir was appointed the President of the Federation of Bosnia and Herzegovina, with the decision of High Representative Valentin Inzko, whose decision enabled the formation of the new Federal government without the support of the Croat representatives in the House of Peoples of the Federation of Bosnia and Herzegovina. This appointment enabled the formation of the new Federal government without Croat political parties.

The HSP BiH's entry into the unpopular Federal government among the Croats of Bosnia and Herzegovina resulted in many members leaving the party, including high officials. In 2013, Živko Budimir challenged Jurišić's leadership of the HSP BiH, and after losing the inter-party election, he formed the new Party of Justice and Trust (SPP). Many members of the HSP BiH joined the newly formed SPP. The flight continued, with many municipal councillors and cantonal assembly representatives leaving the party, including the two HSP BiH's ministers of the Federal Government the very same year. At the 2014 Bosnian general election, the party won two representatives in the Cantonal Assembly of West Herzegovina Canton and one representative in the Cantonal Assembly of Canton 10. The party managed to get one representative in the National Assembly of Republika Srpska on a joint list with other Bosniak political parties.

In 2015, Stanko Primorac was elected the HSP BiH's president, while Jurišić was appointed the President of the Main Headquarters. At the 2018 Bosnian general election, the HSP BiH won one representative in the Cantonal Assembly of the West Herzegovina Canton. The same day, the HSP BiH signed an agreement with former Croatian Party of Rights — Dr. Ante Starčević president Ivan Tepeš. In 2017, another split occurred, with several party members "reviving" the original HSP BiH. In 2020, the two parties along with other fringe parties, joined under Raguž's leadership. At the 2022 Bosnian general election, the HSP BiH had a similar result, winning one representative in the Cantonal Assembly of the West Herzegovina Canton.

== Elections ==
=== Presidency elections ===
Presidency of Bosnia and Herzegovina
Election year	#	Candidate	Votes	%	Representing	Note	Elected?
2006	5th	Zvonko Jurišić	20,350	6.94%	Croats	—	No
2010	3rd	Martin Raguž	60,266	10.84%	Croats	Support	No
2014	1st	Dragan Čović	128,053	52.20%	Croats	Support	Yes
2018	2nd	Dragan Čović	154,819	36.14%	Croats	Support	No
2022	2nd	Borjana Krišto	180,255	44.20%	Croats	Support	No
2026	1st	Darijana Filipović	120,701	47.28%	Croats	Support	Yes

=== Parliamentary Assembly of Bosnia and Herzegovina ===
Parliamentary Assembly of Bosnia and Herzegovina
Year	Leader	#	Popular vote	%	HoR	Seat change	HoP	Seat change	Government
2006 (Note: Run as part of the Coalition for Equality (HSP Đapić-Jurišić and NHI).)	Zvonko Jurišić	11th	69,333	4.91	0 / 42	New	0 / 15	New	Extra-parliamentary
2010 (Note: Run as part of the Croatian Coalition.)	Zvonko Jurišić	8th	50,071	3.05	1 / 42	▲1	1 / 15	▲1	Opposition
2014 (Note: Run in coalition with DSI (Democratic Party of the Disabled).)	Zvonko Jurišić	17th	5,475	0.56	0 / 42	▼1	0 / 15	▼1	Extra-parliamentary
2018 (Note: Run in coalition with HDZ 1990 and HNL.)	Nikola Raguž	10th	28,962	2.93	0 / 42	0	0 / 15	0	Extra-parliamentary
2022 (Note: Run in coalition with HDZ, HSS, HKDU, HSP AS, HDU, HSPHB and HRAST.)	Nikola Raguž	3rd	139,018	8.75	0 / 98	0	0 / 80	0	Extra-parliamentary
2026 (Note: Run in coalition with HDZ, HKDU, HSP AS, HDU, HSP HB, and HRAST.)	Nikola Raguž	4th	110,255	8.15	0 / 42	0	0 / 15	0	Extra-parliamentary

=== Parliament of the Federation of Bosnia and Herzegovina ===
Parliament of the Federation of Bosnia and Herzegovina
Year	Leader	#	Popular vote	%	HoR	Seat change	HoP	Seat change	Government
2006 (Note: Run as part of the Coalition for Equality (HSP Đapić-Jurišić and NHI).)	Zvonko Jurišić	9th	21,152	2.46	1 / 98	New	0 / 58	New	Opposition
2010 (Note: Run as part of the Croatian Coalition.)	Zvonko Jurišić	7th	47,941	4.68	2 / 98	▲1	1 / 58	▲1	Coalition
2014 (Note: Run in coalition with DSI (Democratic Party of the Disabled).)	Zvonko Jurišić	13th	6,775	0.68	0 / 98	▼2	0 / 58	▼1	Extra-parliamentary
2018 (Note: Run in coalition with HDZ 1990 and HNL.)	Nikola Raguž	10th	25,663	2.56	0 / 98	Steady	0 / 58	Steady	Extra-parliamentary
2022 (Note: Run in coalition with HDZ, HSS, HKDU, HSP AS, HDU, HSPHB and HRAST.)	Nikola Raguž	3rd	143,704	14.35	0 / 98	Steady	0 / 80	Steady	Extra-parliamentary
2026 (Note: Run in coalition with HDZ, HSS SR, HKDU, HSP AS, HDU, HSP HB, and HRAST.)	Nikola Raguž	3rd	112,576	14.07	0 / 98	Steady	TBD	TBD	TBD

=== Cantonal assembly elections ===
Cantonal election	Cantonal Assembly										
Cantonal election	Una-Sana	Posavina	Tuzla	Zenica-Doboj	Bosnian Podrinje Goražde	Central Bosnia	Herzegovina-Neretva	West Herzegovina	Sarajevo	Canton 10	Total won / Total contested
2006 (Note: Run as part of the Coalition for Equality (HSP Đapić-Jurišić and NHI).)	0 / 30	1 / 21	0 / 35	0 / 35	0 / 25	0 / 30	2 / 30	4 / 23	0 / 35	4 / 25	11 / 289
2010 (Note: Run as part of the Croatian Coalition in the Tuzla, Zenica-Doboj, Central Bosnia and Sarajevo cantons.)	0 / 30	1 / 21	0 / 35	0 / 35	0 / 25	0 / 30	1 / 30	3 / 23	0 / 35	3 / 25	8 / 289
2014	0 / 30	1 / 21	0 / 35	0 / 35	0 / 25	0 / 30	0 / 30	2 / 23	0 / 35	1 / 25	4 / 289
2018	0 / 30	0 / 21	0 / 35	0 / 35	0 / 25	0 / 30	0 / 30	1 / 23	0 / 35	0 / 25	1 / 289
2022	0 / 30	0 / 21	0 / 35	0 / 35	0 / 25	0 / 30	0 / 30	1 / 23	0 / 35	0 / 25	1 / 289
2026	0 / 30	0 / 21	0 / 35	0 / 35	0 / 25	0 / 30	0 / 30	1 / 23	0 / 35	0 / 25	1 / 289
