= Croatian Democratic Union of Bosnia and Herzegovina =

Bosnian Croat political party

Croatian Democratic Union of Bosnia and Herzegovina Hrvatska demokratska zajednica Bosne i Hercegovine
- Abbreviation: HDZ BiH
- President: Dragan Čović
- General Secretary: Goran Božić
- Deputy President: Borjana Krišto
- Founder: Davor Perinović
- Founded: 18 August 1990; 36 years ago
- Headquarters: Kneza Domagoja bb, Mostar
- Youth wing: Youth HDZ BiH
- Membership (2014): 35,000
- Ideology: Conservatism; Christian democracy; Croatian nationalism; Pro-Europeanism
- Political position: Centre-right to right-wing
- National affiliation: Croatian National Assembly
- European affiliation: European People's Party (associate)
- International affiliation: International Democracy Union
- Colors: Blue
- HoP BiH: 3 / 15
- HoR BiH: 4 / 42
- HoP FBiH: 16 / 80
- HoR FBiH: 15 / 98
- NA RS: 0 / 83
- Cantonal Heads: 3 / 10
- Mayors: 20 / 145

Website
- hdzbih.org

The Croatian Democratic Union of Bosnia and Herzegovina (Croatian: Hrvatska demokratska zajednica Bosne i Hercegovine, abbr. HDZ BiH) is a Christian democratic Croatian nationalist political party in Bosnia and Herzegovina, representing the Croats of Bosnia and Herzegovina. It is an associate member of the European People's Party. Its headquarters is in Mostar.

== History ==
The party was founded on 18 August 1990, with the first party convention held in Sarajevo. It has participated in all multiparty elections held in Bosnia and Herzegovina since 1991. It regularly won the support of the Croat electorate up to 2000 and took part in forming the government. It returned to power in 2002, where it remained until 2010. Since 2014, the party has once again been in power.

In the October 2002 general election, the party was part of the "Croatian Coalition" (Hrvatska koalicija) which won 9.5% of the popular vote and five out of 42 seats in the national House of Representatives and 16 of the 98 seats in the Federal House of Representatives.

In 2006, the party joined the Croatian National Assembly, an alliance of Bosnian Croat political parties, along with the Croatian Party of Rights of Bosnia and Herzegovina and the Croat People's Union. Shortly after, a group HDZ BiH members loyal to Božo Ljubić left the party and founded the Croatian Democratic Union 1990 on 26 April 2006.

Throughout its history, the HDZ BiH has had nine presidents, the current one being Dragan Čović since 5 June 2005. Four of the six Croat members of the Presidency of Bosnia and Herzegovina have come from the party, the most recent one also being Čović, serving in office from 2014 until 2018.

In the 2018 general election, the party was in a coalition with three other Bosnian Croat parties (Croatian Peasant Party of Bosnia and Herzegovina, Croatian Party of Rights of Bosnia and Herzegovina, Croatian Christian Democratic Union of Bosnia and Herzegovina), winning 149,872 or 9.05% of the votes, five out of 42 seats in the national House of Representatives and 16 out of 98 in the Federal one.

== List of presidents ==
#	Name (Born–Died)	Portrait	Term of Office	
1	Davorin Perinović (b. 1949)		18 August 1990	7 September 1990
2	Stjepan Kljuić (b. 1939)		7 September 1990	2 February 1992
3	Milenko Brkić (1944–2017)		2 February 1992	14 November 1992
4	Mate Boban (1940–1997)		14 November 1992	10 July 1994
5	Dario Kordić (b. 1960)		10 July 1994	2 December 1995
6	Božo Rajić (b. 1943)		2 December 1995	17 May 1998
7	Ante Jelavić (b. 1963)		17 May 1998	4 May 2002
8	Bariša Čolak (b. 1956)		4 May 2002	5 June 2005
9	Dragan Čović (b. 1956)		5 June 2005	present

== Election results ==
=== Parliamentary Assembly of Bosnia and Herzegovina ===
Assembly of the Socialist Republic of Bosnia and Herzegovina
Year	Leader	#	Popular vote	%	Seats won	Government
1990	Stjepan Kljuić	3rd	362,855	16.07	44 / 240	Coalition

Parliamentary Assembly of Bosnia and Herzegovina
Year	Leader	#	Popular vote	%	HoR	Seat change	HoP	Seat change	Government
1996	Božo Rajić	3rd	338,440	14.10	8 / 42	New	5 / 15	New	Coalition
1998	Ante Jelavić	2nd	200,092	11.59	6 / 42	▼2	5 / 15	0	Coalition
2000	Ante Jelavić	4th	169,821	11.40	5 / 42	▼1	0 / 15	▼5	Opposition
2002 (Note: Run in coalition with HD.)	Bariša Čolak	6th	116,452	9.48	5 / 42	0	4 / 15	▲4	Coalition
2006 (Note: Run as part of the Croatian Coalition (HDZ, HNZ and HSP).)	Dragan Čović	6th	69,333	4.91	3 / 42	▼2	3 / 15	▼1	Coalition
2010	Dragan Čović	6th	114,476	6.97	3 / 42	0	2 / 15	▼1	Coalition
2014 (Note: Run in coalition with HSS, HKDU, HSP AS and HSPHB.)	Dragan Čović	6th	123,023	7.54	4 / 42	▲1	3 / 15	▲1	Coalition
2018 (Note: Run in coalition with HSS, HSP, HSP AS and HKDU.)	Dragan Čović	5th	149,872	9.05	5 / 42	▲1	4 / 15	▲1	Coalition
2022 (Note: Run in coalition with HSS, HSP, HKDU, HSP AS, HDU, HSP HB and HRAST.)	Dragan Čović	3rd	139,018	8.75	4 / 42	▼1	3 / 15	▼1	Coalition
2026 (Note: Run in coalition with HSP, HKDU, HSP AS, HDU, HSP HB and HRAST.)	Dragan Čović	4th	110,255	8.15	4 / 42	0	TBD	TBD	TBD

=== Parliament of the Federation of Bosnia and Herzegovina ===
Parliament of the Federation of Bosnia and Herzegovina
Year	Leader	#	Popular vote	%	HoR	Seat change	HoP	Seat change	Government
1996	Božo Rajić	2nd	337,794	25.29	36 / 140	New	30 / 65	New	Coalition
1998	Ante Jelavić	2nd	184,569	19.89	28 / 140	▼8	25 / 72	▼5	Coalition
2000	Ante Jelavić	3rd	151,812	17.49	25 / 140	▼3	11 / 81	▼14	Opposition
2002 (Note: Run in coalition with HD.)	Bariša Čolak	4th	113,097	15.76	16 / 98	▼9	13 / 58	▲2	Coalition
2006 (Note: Run as part of the Croatian Coalition (HDZ, HNZ and HSP).)	Dragan Čović	4th	64,906	7.56	8 / 98	▼8	7 / 58	▼6	Coalition
2010	Dragan Čović	4th	108,943	10.64	12 / 98	▲4	10 / 58	▲3	Opposition
2014 (Note: Run in coalition with HSS, HKDU, HSP AS and HSPHB.)	Dragan Čović	4th	118,375	11.93	12 / 98	Steady	13 / 58	▲3	Coalition
2018 (Note: Run in coalition with HSS, HSP, HSP AS and HKDU.)	Dragan Čović	3rd	143,704	14.35	16 / 98	▲4	13 / 58	Steady	Coalition
2022 (Note: Run in coalition with HSS, HSP, HKDU, HSP AS, HDU, HSP HB and HRAST.)	Dragan Čović	3rd	130,566	13.38	15 / 98	▼1	17 / 80	▲4	Coalition
2026 (Note: Run in coalition with HSS SR, HSP, HKDU, HSP AS, HDU, HSP HB and HRAST.)	Dragan Čović	3rd	112,576	14.07	15 / 98	Steady	TBD	TBD	TBD

=== Presidency elections ===
Presidency of Bosnia and Herzegovina
Election year	#	Candidate	Votes	%	Representing	Elected?
1996	1st	Krešimir Zubak	330,477	88.70%	Croats	Yes
1998	1st	Ante Jelavić	189,438	52.91%	Croats	Yes
2002	1st	Dragan Čović	114,606	61.52%	Croats	Yes
2006	2nd	Ivo Miro Jović	76,681	26.14%	Croats	No
2010	2nd	Borjana Krišto	109,758	19.74%	Croats	No
2014	1st	Dragan Čović	128,053	52.20%	Croats	Yes
2018	2nd	Dragan Čović	154,819	36.14%	Croats	No
2022	2nd	Borjana Krišto	180,255	44.20%	Croats	No
2026	1st	Darijana Filipović	120.701	47.28%	Croats	Yes

=== Cantonal elections ===
Cantonal election	Cantonal Assembly										
Cantonal election	Una-Sana	Posavina	Tuzla	Zenica-Doboj	Bosnian Podrinje Goražde	Central Bosnia	Herzegovina-Neretva	West Herzegovina	Sarajevo	Canton 10	Total won / Total contested
1996	1 / 50	17 / 20	3 / 50	9 / 59	0 / 31	23 / 55	28 / 50	29 / 31	3 / 45	13 / 15	125 / 406
1998	1 / 50	17 / 30	2 / 50	4 / 50	0 / 31	18 / 50	25 / 50	26 / 31	1 / 45	18 / 30	112 / 417
2000	0 / 30	7 / 19	1 / 35	2 / 35	0 / 25	8 / 28	13 / 28	15 / 21	1 / 35	12 / 23	59 / 279
2002	0 / 30	10 / 21	0 / 35	2 / 35	0 / 25	10 / 30	15 / 30	18 / 23	0 / 35	13 / 25	68 / 289
2006	0 / 30	7 / 21	0 / 35	2 / 35	0 / 25	6 / 30	7 / 30	9 / 23	0 / 35	5 / 25	36 / 289
2010	0 / 30	8 / 21	1 / 35	2 / 35	0 / 25	7 / 30	10 / 30	13 / 23	0 / 35	7 / 25	48 / 289
2014	0 / 30	7 / 21	0 / 35	2 / 35	0 / 25	8 / 30	11 / 30	14 / 23	0 / 35	9 / 25	51 / 289
2018	0 / 30	11 / 21	0 / 35	3 / 35	0 / 25	9 / 30	13 / 30	16 / 23	0 / 35	8 / 25	57 / 289
2022	0 / 30	12 / 21	0 / 35	3 / 35	0 / 25	9 / 30	11 / 30	14 / 23	0 / 35	5 / 25	54 / 289
2026	0 / 30	13 / 21	0 / 35	2 / 35	0 / 25	8 / 30	13 / 30	17 / 23	0 / 35	7 / 25	60 / 289

== See also ==
- Croatian Democratic Union
- Croatian Democratic Union 1990
