= 1998 Bosnian general election =

- 12 and 13 September 1998
- Turnout: 67.87% (presidential) ▼12.55 pp 67.99% (parliamentary) ▼11.41 pp
- Bosniak member of the Presidency
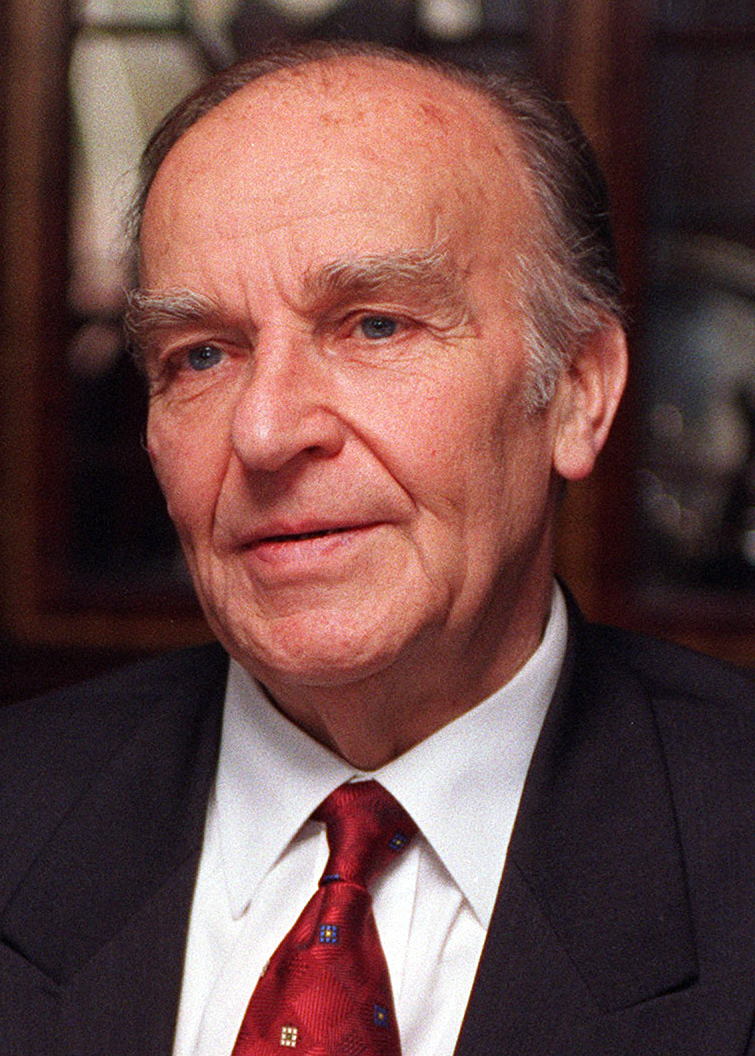

Candidate	Alija Izetbegović	Fikret Abdić
Party	SDA	DNZ
Popular vote	511,541	36,438
Percentage	86.80%	6.18%
- Croat member of the Presidency

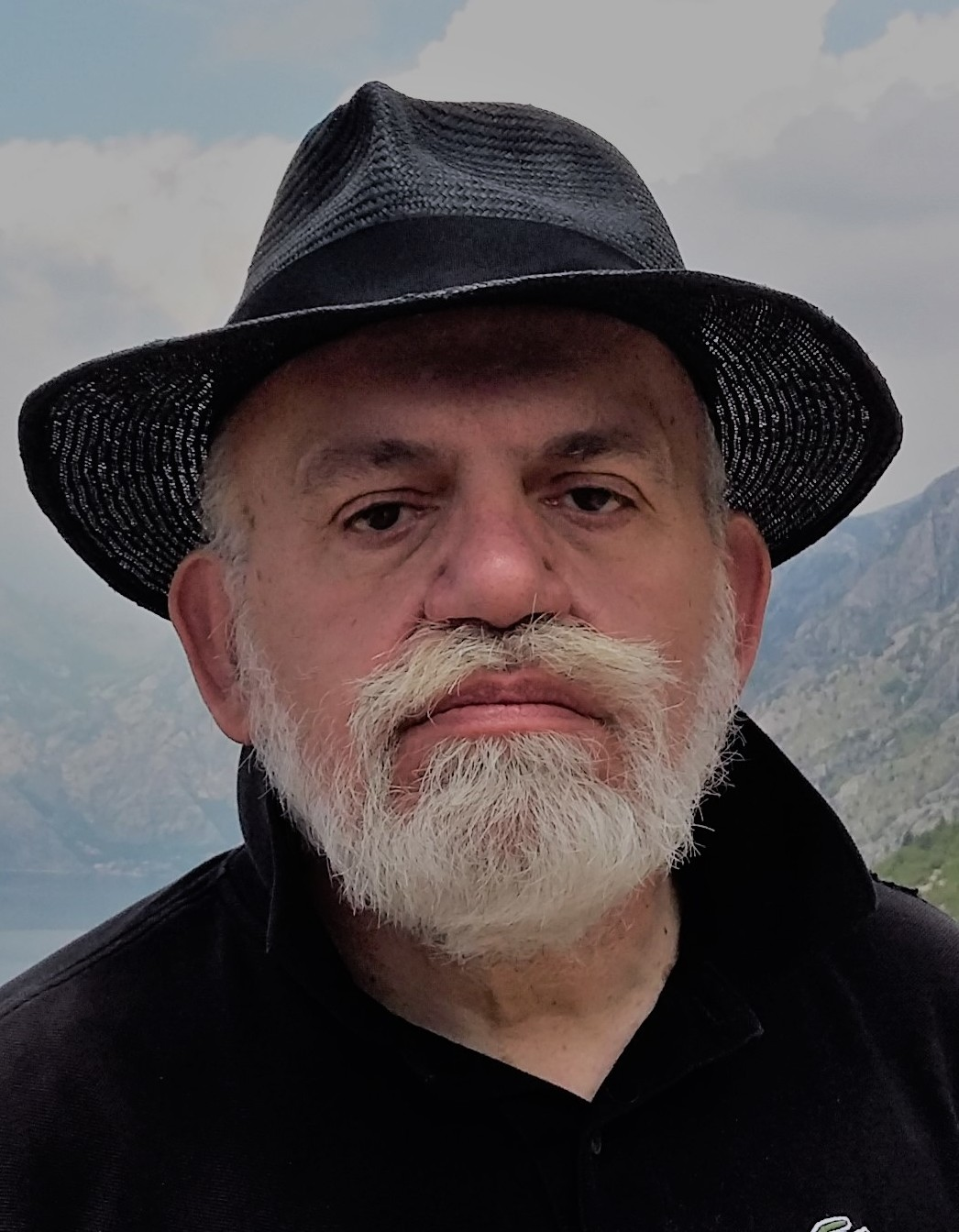
Candidate	Ante Jelavić	Gradimir Gojer
Party	HDZ BiH	SDP BiH
Popular vote	189,438	113,961
Percentage	52.91%	31.83%
- Serb member of the Presidency
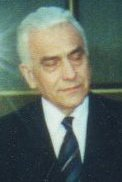

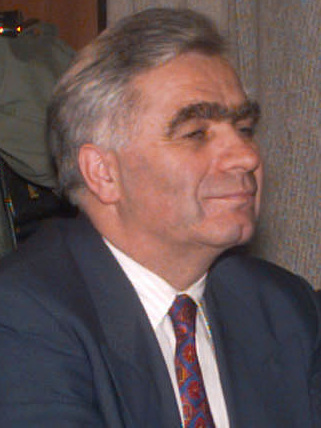
Candidate	Živko Radišić	Momčilo Krajišnik
Party	SP	SDS
Popular vote	359,937	314,236
Percentage	51.31%	44.79%
Presidency members before election
Alija Izetbegović (Bosniak)
Krešimir Zubak (Croat)
Momčilo Krajišnik (Serb)
Elected Presidency members
Alija Izetbegović (Bosniak)
Ante Jelavić (Croat)
Živko Radišić (Serb)
- House of Representatives
- All 42 seats in the House of Representatives; 22 seats needed for a majority
Party	Leader	Vote %	Seats	+/–
SDA–SBiH–LS–GDS	Alija Izetbegović	33.83	17	−4
SNS–SP–SNSD	Biljana Plavšić	12.44	4	New
HDZ BiH	Ante Jelavić	11.59	6	−2
SDS	Dragan Kalinić	9.43	4	−5
SDP BiH	Zlatko Lagumdžija	9.26	4	+2
SRS RS	Nikola Poplašen	6.87	2	+2
NHI–HKDU	Krešimir Zubak	2.32	1	New
UBSD	Sejfudin Tokić	1.66	2	+2
RS RS	Dragan Đurđević	1.60	1	New
DNZ	Fikret Abdić	1.24	1	+1
This lists parties that won seats. See the complete results below.
Co-Chairmen before	Co-Chairmen after
Haris Silajdžić (SBiH); Boro Bosić (SDS)	Haris Silajdžić (SBiH); Svetozar Mihajlović (SP)

General elections were held in Bosnia and Herzegovina on 12 and 13 September 1998. Voter turnout was 67.99% in the parliamentary election and 67.87% in the presidential election.

The elections for the House of Representatives were divided into two; one for the Federation of Bosnia and Herzegovina and one for Republika Srpska. In the presidential election, voters in the Federation re-elected Bosniak Alija Izetbegović and elected Croat Ante Jelavić, while voters in Republika Srpska elected Serb Živko Radišić. The Coalition for Unity and Democracy, an alliance of the Party of Democratic Action, the Party for Bosnia and Herzegovina, the Liberal Party and the Civic Democratic Party, emerged as the largest party in the House of Representatives, winning 17 of the 42 seats.

== Results ==
=== Presidency ===
Candidate	Party	Votes	%
Bosniak member
Alija Izetbegović	Party of Democratic Action	511,541	86.80
Fikret Abdić	Democratic People's Union	36,438	6.18
Sefer Halilović	Bosnian-Herzegovinian Patriotic Party	33,687	5.72
Hajrija Rahmanović	Bosnian Party	7,694	1.31
Total		589,360	100.00
Croat member
Ante Jelavić	Croatian Democratic Union	189,438	52.91
Gradimir Gojer	Social Democratic Party	113,961	31.83
Krešimir Zubak	New Croatian Initiative	40,880	11.42
Senka Nožica	Republican Party	11,089	3.10
Saša Nišandžić	Bosnian Party	2,638	0.74
Total		358,006	100.00
Serb member
Živko Radišić	Sloga (SNS–SP–SNSD)	359,937	51.31
Momčilo Krajišnik	Serb Democratic Party	314,236	44.79
Zoran Tadić	Serbian Coalition for Republika Srpska	27,388	3.90
Total		701,561	100.00
Valid votes		1,648,927	88.32
Invalid/blank votes		218,019	11.68
Total votes		1,866,946	100.00
Registered voters/turnout		2,750,705	67.87
Source: CEC, Nohlen & Stöver

=== House of Representatives ===
Party	Votes	%	Seats	+/–
Coalition for Unity and Democracy (SDA–SBiH–LS–GDS)	583,945	33.83	17	–4
Sloga (SNS–SP–SNSD)	214,716	12.44	4	New
Croatian Democratic Union	200,092	11.59	6	–2
Serb Democratic Party	162,721	9.43	4	–5
Social Democratic Party	159,876	9.26	4	–
Serbian Radical Party	118,522	6.87	2	+2
NHI–HKDU	40,080	2.32	1	New
Union of Social Democrats	28,740	1.66	2	–
Radical Party of Republika Srpska	27,686	1.60	1	New
Serbian Coalition for Republika Srpska	24,957	1.45	0	New
Democratic People's Union	21,452	1.24	1	+1
Bosnian Party	17,075	0.99	0	0
Democratic Party of Republika Srpska	14,956	0.87	0	New
Democratic Party of Pensioners	12,991	0.75	0	New
Bosnian-Herzegovinian Patriotic Party	11,726	0.68	0	0
Social Democrats	11,301	0.65	0	New
Croatian Party of Rights	10,305	0.60	0	0
Coalition of Centre	8,697	0.50	0	New
Pensioners' Party of the Republika Srpska	8,204	0.48	0	New
Zdravko Grebo	6,962	0.40	0	New
Serbian Peasant Party	4,925	0.29	0	New
Bosniak Party of Rights	4,900	0.28	0	New
Bosnian Greens	4,448	0.26	0	New
Coalition for the King and Fatherland	3,878	0.22	0	New
Democratic Party of the Disabled	3,851	0.22	0	New
Croatian Peasant Party	3,119	0.18	0	–
Croat People's Union	3,112	0.18	0	New
Serbian Renewal Movement	2,925	0.17	0	New
Muslim Bosniak Organisation	1,777	0.10	0	–
For the King and Fatherland – Serbian Monarchist Alliance	1,743	0.10	0	New
Party of Economic Prosperity	1,613	0.09	0	New
Yugoslav Left	1,387	0.08	0	New
Serbian Fatherland Front	1,342	0.08	0	New
Liberal-Social Party	1,239	0.07	0	New
Party for Yugoslavia	970	0.06	0	New
Total	1,726,233	100.00	42	0
Valid votes	1,726,233	92.31		
Invalid/blank votes	143,850	7.69		
Total votes	1,870,083	100.00		
Registered voters/turnout	2,750,705	67.99		
Source: CEC, Nohlen & Stöver

==== By entity ====
Party	Federation			Republika Srpska			Total seats
Party	Votes	%	Seats	Votes	%	Seats	Total seats
Coalition for Unity and Democracy (SDA–SBiH–LS–GDS)	455,668	47.90	14	128,277	16.55	3	17
Sloga (SNS–SP–SNSD)				214,716	27.71	4	4
Croatian Democratic Union	187,707	19.73	6	12,385	1.60	0	6
Serb Democratic Party				162,721	21.00	4	4
Social Democratic Party	138,004	14.51	4	21,872	2.82	0	4
Serbian Radical Party				118,522	15.29	2	2
NHI–HKDU	28,572	3.00	1	11,508	1.48	0	1
Union of Social Democrats	28,740	3.02	2				2
Radical Party of Republika Srpska				27,686	3.57	1	1
Serbian Coalition for Republika Srpska				24,957	3.22	0	0
Democratic People's Union	21,452	2.26	1				1
Bosnian Party	13,601	1.43	0	3,474	0.45	0	0
Democratic Party of Republika Srpska				14,956	1.93	0	0
Democratic Party of Pensioners	12,991	1.37	0				0
Bosnian-Herzegovinian Patriotic Party	11,726	1.23	0				0
Social Democrats	7,847	0.82	0	3,454	0.45	0	0
Croatian Party of Rights	10,305	1.08	0				0
Coalition of Centre	7,426	0.78	0	1,271	0.16	0	0
Pensioners' Party of the Republika Srpska				8,204	1.06	0	0
Zdravko Grebo	6,962	0.73	0				0
Serbian Peasant Party				4,925	0.64	–	0
Bosnian Party of Rights	4,900	0.52	0				0
Bosnian Greens	2,551	0.27	0	1,897	0.24	0	0
Coalition for the King and Fatherland				3,878	0.50	0	0
Democratic Party of the Disabled	3,851	0.40	0				0
Croatian Peasant Party	2,226	0.23	0	893	0.12	0	0
Croat People's Union	2,099	0.22	0	1,013	0.13	0	0
Serbian Renewal Movement				2,925	0.38	0	0
Muslim Bosniak Organisation	1,777	0.19	0				0
For the King and Fatherland – Serbian Monarchist Alliance				1,743	0.22	0	0
Party of Economic Prosperity	1,613	0.17	0				0
Yugoslav Left				1,387	0.18	0	0
Serbian Fatherland Front				1,342	0.17	0	0
Liberal-Social Party	1,239	0.13	0				0
Party for Yugoslavia				970	0.13	0	0
Total	951,257	100.00	28	774,976	100.00	14	42
Valid votes	951,257	92.99		774,976	91.48		
Invalid/blank votes	71,718	7.01		72,132	8.52		
Total votes	1,022,975	100.00		847,108	100.00		
Source: CEC, Nohlen & Stöver
