= 1996 Canton 10 parliamentary election =

Cantonal election in Bosnia and Herzegovina

- 14 September 1996
- All 15 seats in the Assembly of Canton 10; 8 seats needed for a majority
Party	Leader	Vote %	Seats
HDZ BiH	Mijo Tokić	80.37	13
SDA	Ibrahim Burza	12.06	2
This lists parties that won seats. See the complete results below.
Prime Minister before	Prime Minister after
Filip Andrić; HDZ BiH	Filip Andrić; HDZ BiH

The 1996 Canton 10 parliamentary election was held on 14 September 1996 to elect all 15 members of the Assembly of Canton 10 in Canton 10, one of the ten cantons of the Federation of Bosnia and Herzegovina. It was part of the 1996 Bosnian general election.

The Croatian Democratic Union of Bosnia and Herzegovina (HDZ BiH) won 80.37% of valid votes and 13 seats. The Party of Democratic Action (SDA) won the remaining two seats.

== Results ==
The certified results record 6 parties or lists and 51,902 ballots cast, of which 49,580 were valid and 2,322 were invalid.

Final results
Party or list	Votes	%	Seats
HDZ BiH	39,847	80.37	13
SDA	5,979	12.06	2
HSP	1,753	3.54	0
Joint List (HSS–RBiH–SDP BiH–UBSD–MBO)	1,058	2.13	0
HČSP BiH	803	1.62	0
BOSS	140	0.28	0
Total	49,580	100.00	15
Source: Provisional Election Commission, as published in the Official Gazette of the Federation of Bosnia and Herzegovina.

Ballot status
Category	Ballots	% of ballots cast
Valid ballots	49,580	95.53
Invalid ballots	2,322	4.47
Total ballots cast	51,902	100.00
Source: Provisional Election Commission.

== Elected members ==
The following members are listed in the certified results signed on 16 October 1996.

Certified elected-member list
Party or list	Members
HDZ BiH	Mijo Tokić, Mirko Baković, Mario Bagarić, Ile Krezo, Drago Tokmakčija, Blaško Pavlović, Tihomir Marinčić, Filip Andrić, Stjepan Vidović, Josip Perić, Mirko Mihaljević, Petar Radoš, Draško Dalić
SDA	Ibrahim Burza, Munib Huseinagić
Source: Provisional Election Commission.

== Government formation ==
Filip Andrić was elected governor on 26 March 1996, with the same decision assigning him the duties of prime minister. Andrić continued as prime minister during the subsequent legislative term, leaving office on 14 December 1998.

After the election, Mijo Tokić became president of the Assembly, and Mirko Baković became governor. Constitutional amendments published on 13 December 1996 set the Assembly's size at 30 members. The election results above show the 15 mandates allocated in the certified September election.
