= 1990 Bosnian general election =

- 18 November 1990
- Chamber of Citizens
- All 130 seats in the Chamber of Citizens; 66 seats needed for a majority
- Turnout: 77.49%
Party	Leader	Vote %	Seats
SDA	Alija Izetbegović	31.48	43
SDS	Radovan Karadžić	26.14	34
HDZ BiH	Stjepan Kljuić	16.07	21
SK BiH	Nijaz Duraković	12.31	15
SRSJ	Nenad Kecmanović	8.90	12
SSO–DSS–DSZ	Ibrahim Spahić	3.17	3
MBO	Adil Zulfikarpašić	1.15	2
This lists parties that won seats. See the complete results below.
Prime Minister before	Subsequent Prime Minister
Marko Ćeranić; SK BiH	Jure Pelivan; HDZ BiH

General elections were held in Bosnia and Herzegovina on 18 November 1990, with a second round of voting in the Chamber of Municipalities elections on 2 December. These were the final general elections to be held in Bosnia and Herzegovina while it was still a constituent republic of the SFR Yugoslavia.

A presidential election was held to elect candidates to a seven-member republic presidium. Six candidates were elected to represent Bosnia's nations (two each by Bosnian Muslims, Bosnian Serbs, and Bosnian Croats), and a seventh candidate was elected to represent all "others".

All of the presidential seats were won by parties structured around national lines: the Party of Democratic Action (SDA) won the two Muslim seats, the Serb Democratic Party (SDS) won the two Serb seats, the Croatian Democratic Union (HDZ) won the two Croat seats, and the "other" seat was won by SDA member Ejup Ganić, who ran as a "Yugoslav". Although Fikret Abdić received more votes than any other candidate, he agreed to stand aside and permit fellow SDA member Alija Izetbegović to become president of the presidium.

The Party of Democratic Action also emerged as the largest party in the election for the Assembly of the Socialist Republic of Bosnia and Herzegovina, with 43 of the 130 seats in the Chamber of Citizens and 43 of the 110 seats in the Chamber of Municipalities. Voter turnout was 74.4% for the presidential election, 81.6% for the Chamber of Municipalities election and 77.5% for the Chamber of Citizens election. However, the election was marred by irregularities; in Brčko, Doboj, Nevesinje and Sarajevo there were more votes than registered voters (13,316 registered voters in Brčko but 49,055 votes, 4,771 voters in the Old City of Sarajevo but 28,974 votes).

== Results ==
=== Presidency (seven members) ===
Candidate	Party	Votes	%
Bosniaks (two elected)
Fikret Abdić	Party of Democratic Action	1,045,539	32.69
Alija Izetbegović	Party of Democratic Action	879,266	27.49
Nijaz Duraković	League of Communists	558,263	17.46
Džemal Sokolović	Union of Reform Forces of Yugoslavia	183,171	5.73
Nazif Gljiva	League of Socialist Youth – Democratic Alliance	133,587	4.18
Fejsal Hrustanović	League of Communists	122,002	3.82
Dževad Haznadar	Union of Reform Forces of Yugoslavia	120,560	3.77
Bahrudin Bijedić	Independent	104,335	3.26
Adil Zulfikarpašić	Muslim Bosniak Organisation	51,225	1.60
Total		3,197,948	100.00
Serbs (two elected)
Biljana Plavšić	Serb Democratic Party	573,812	22.16
Nikola Koljević	Serb Democratic Party	556,218	21.48
Nenad Kecmanović	Union of Reform Forces of Yugoslavia	500,783	19.34
Mirko Pejanović	League of Communists	335,392	12.95
Nikola Stojanović	League of Communists	238,377	9.21
Đorđe Latinović	League of Socialist Youth – Democratic Alliance	223,044	8.61
Ranko Zrilić	Union of Reform Forces of Yugoslavia	161,910	6.25
Total		2,589,536	100.00
Croats (two elected)
Stjepan Kljuić	Croatian Democratic Union	473,002	22.23
Franjo Boras	Croatian Democratic Union	416,629	19.58
Ivo Komšić	League of Communists	353,707	16.62
Zoran Perković	League of Communists	290,333	13.65
Franjo Bošković	Union of Reform Forces of Yugoslavia	250,099	11.75
Tadej Mateljan	Union of Reform Forces of Yugoslavia	213,516	10.03
Martin Raguž	League of Socialist Youth – Democratic Alliance	130,428	6.13
Total		2,127,714	100.00
Others (one elected)
Ejup Ganić	Party of Democratic Action	709,691	43.10
Ivan Čerešnješ	Serb Democratic Party	362,681	22.03
Josip Pejaković	Union of Reform Forces of Yugoslavia	317,978	19.31
Zlatko Lagumdžija	League of Communists	194,723	11.83
Azemina Vuković	League of Socialist Youth – Democratic Alliance	61,542	3.74
Total		1,646,615	100.00
Valid votes		2,204,947	94.23
Invalid/blank votes		135,011	5.77
Total votes		2,339,958	100.00
Registered voters/turnout		3,144,353	74.42
Source: Nohlen & Stöver

=== Chamber of Citizens ===
Party	Votes	%	Seats
Party of Democratic Action	711,075	31.48	43
Serb Democratic Party	590,431	26.14	34
Croatian Democratic Union	362,855	16.07	21
League of Communists	278,027	12.31	15
Union of Reform Forces of Yugoslavia	201,018	8.90	12
SSO–DSS–DSZ	39,982	1.77	2
Democratic Socialist Alliance	31,623	1.40	1
Muslim Bosniak Organisation	25,975	1.15	2
Other parties	17,522	0.78	0
Total	2,258,508	100.00	130
Valid votes	2,258,508	96.57	
Invalid/blank votes	80,219	3.43	
Total votes	2,338,727	100.00	
Registered voters/turnout	3,018,206	77.49	
Source: Nohlen & Stöver

=== Chamber of Municipalities ===
Party	Votes	%	Seats
Party of Democratic Action	788,616	30.84	43
Serb Democratic Party	624,951	24.44	38
Croatian Democratic Union	383,279	14.99	23
League of Communists	378,198	14.79	4
Union of Reform Forces of Yugoslavia	281,436	11.00	1
Serbian Renewal Movement	4,217	0.16	1
Other parties	96,650	3.78	0
Total	2,557,347	100.00	110
Valid votes	2,557,347	96.83	
Invalid/blank votes	83,623	3.17	
Total votes	2,640,970	100.00	
Registered voters/turnout	3,235,360	81.63	
Source: Nohlen & Stöver
