= Union of Social Democrats of Bosnia and Herzegovina =

Union of Social Democrats Unija socijaldemokrata
- Founder: Sejfudin Tokić
- Founded: 1992
- Dissolved: February 1999
- Merged into: Social Democratic Party
- Headquarters: Sarajevo
- Ideology: Social democracy Pro-Europeanism
- Political position: Centre-left

The Union of Social Democrats of Bosnia and Herzegovina (Bosnian: Unija bosansko-hercegovačkih socijaldemokrata; abbr. UBSD) was a social-democratic political party in Bosnia and Herzegovina. Founded in 1992, it merged into the Social Democratic Party in 1999.

== History ==
The UBSD was formed by the Bosnian section of the Union of Reform Forces after the breakup of Yugoslavia. It contested the 1996 general election as part of the Joint List alliance alongside the Social Democratic Party, the Croatian Peasant Party, the Muslim Bosniak Organisation and the Republican Party. Candidates for the Bosniak and Croat members of the Presidency, Sead Avdić and Ivo Komšić, were not elected. In the election for the national House of Representatives, the Joint List received 5.68% of the vote and won two of the 42 seats.

In the 1998 general election, the party did not put forward a presidential candidate, but won two seats in the national House of Representatives. It merged into the Social Democratic Party in February 1999.

== Election results ==
=== Parliamentary Assembly of Bosnia and Herzegovina ===
Election	#	Vote	%	HoR	+/–	HoP	+/–	Status
1996	Part of the Joint List			0 / 42	New	0 / 15	New	Extra-parliamentary
1998	8th	28,740	1.66	2 / 42	▲2	0 / 15	0	Opposition
