= 2000 Canton 10 parliamentary election =

Cantonal election in Bosnia and Herzegovina

- 11 November 2000
- All 25 seats in the Assembly of Canton 10 (Note: Two HDZ BiH mandates were withheld following an EASC decision and remained vacant. 23 mandates were therefore allocated. The seats-for-election and majority figures refer to the full 25-seat assembly.); 13 seats needed for a majority
Party	Leader	Vote %	Seats	+/–
HDZ BiH (Note: Seat changes compare electoral lists. The 1998 NHI–HKDU coalition is shown separately from NHI and HKDU BiH, which contested the 2000 election separately. The 1998 Coalition for a United and Democratic Bosnia and Herzegovina (KCD) is also shown separately from its constituent parties. Its four seats are not assigned to either SDA or SBiH. The ZSD comparison follows the 1998–2000 vote comparison in the archived results; the 1998 seat chart labels that list SD (DA) BiH.)	Anto Omazić	54.6	12	−6
SNSD	Milorad Bodroža	7.7	2	+2
SDA	Jasenko Tufekčić	7.1	2	+2
HSP	Ivan Miloloža	5.2	1	0
HKDU BiH	Ante Pašalić	4.7	1	+1
SDP BiH	Tihomir Ćurak	4.0	1	0
HSS BiH	Ante Čolak	3.6	1	0
SBiH	Ale Kamber	3.5	1	+1
SP	Slobodan Sabljić	3.2	1	−1
ZSD	Veljko Aćić	2.6	1	−1
This lists parties that won seats. See the complete results below.
Prime Minister after
Anto Omazić; HDZ BiH

The 2000 Canton 10 parliamentary election was held on 11 November 2000 to elect members of the Assembly of Canton 10 in Canton 10, one of the ten cantons of the Federation of Bosnia and Herzegovina. It was part of the 2000 Bosnian parliamentary election.

The Croatian Democratic Union of Bosnia and Herzegovina (HDZ BiH) received 54.6% of valid votes. In the final allocation, HDZ BiH held 12 seats; SNSD and the Party of Democratic Action (SDA) held two each; and seven other lists held one each. Two seats remained vacant.

== Results ==
The published candidate lists included 17 lists and 221 names. The recorded valid vote total was 33,331. Vote shares below follow the archived OSCE results and are reported to one decimal place.

On 15 November 2000, the Election Appeals Sub-Commission (EASC) sanctioned HDZ BiH for supporting a referendum during the election silence period. It struck the two HDZ candidates with the most votes in each of the five cantonal assemblies, including this canton. Their mandates could not be reallocated and remained vacant.

The table shows the 23 mandates allocated after those sanctions, compared with the 30 mandates recorded for the canton in the 1998 seat chart.

Final results
Party or list	Votes	%	Seats	Change from 1998
HDZ BiH	18,210	54.6	12	−6
SNSD	2,581	7.7	2	+2
SDA	2,374	7.1	2	+2
HSP	1,720	5.2	1	0
HKDU BiH	1,550	4.7	1	+1
SDP BiH	1,336	4.0	1	0
HSS BiH	1,204	3.6	1	0
SBiH	1,164	3.5	1	+1
SP	1,063	3.2	1	−1
ZSD	880	2.6	1	−1
NHI	452	1.4	0	0
DSP	375	1.1	0	0
HNZ	141	0.4	0	0
SS RS	105	0.3	0	0
HKD	82	0.2	0	0
UHSP BiH	51	0.2	0	0
DNZ BiH	43	0.1	0	0
Total	33,331	100.0	23	
Source: Central Election Commission of Bosnia and Herzegovina (archived OSCE results).

Seat allocation
Category	Seats
Mandates allocated	23
Mandates withheld and left vacant	2
Total seats	25
Sources: Central Election Commission of Bosnia and Herzegovina and the OSCE Mission to Bosnia and Herzegovina.

Valid votes by voting origin
Voting origin	Valid votes	% of valid votes
In municipality	27,980	83.95
Out of municipality	5,351	16.05
Total	33,331	100.00
Source: Central Election Commission of Bosnia and Herzegovina (archived OSCE results).

== Government formation ==
The cantonal mandate committee reported that the Provisional Election Commission had technically certified the results on 27 November 2000. The government was headed by Stipo Pelivan in February 2001. On 25 April 2001, the cantonal governor appointed Anto Omazić as prime minister, with the appointment subject to confirmation by the Assembly.
