= Republican Party (Bosnia and Herzegovina) =

The Republican Party (Bosnian: Republikanska stranka, RS) was a political party in Bosnia and Herzegovina founded in 1994. It adopted a secular policy but did not win support from many Bosniaks.

== History ==
The party was founded in 1994 by Bosnian Croat politician Stjepan Kljuić. It contested the 1996 general elections as part of the Joint List alliance alongside the Social Democratic Party, the Union of Social Democrats, the Muslim Bosniak Organisation and the Croatian Peasant Party. The Joint List put forward Sead Avdić as its candidate for Bosniak member of the Presidency, but he finished fourth with just 2.33% of the vote. Its candidate for the Croat member, Ivo Komšić, finished second, but far behind winning candidate Krešimir Zubak. In the election for the House of Representatives, the Joint List received 4.4% of the vote and won two seats in the Federation of Bosnia and Herzegovina and 1.3% of the vote and no seats in Republika Srpska.

For the 1998 elections the party put forward Senka Nožica for the Croat member of the Presidency, but he finished fourth in the vote. In the 2000 parliamentary elections the party won a single seat in the House of Representatives of the Federation of Bosnia and Herzegovina with 0.6% of the vote. For the 2002 general elections the party nominated Stjepan Kljuić as its candidate for the Croat member, but he also finished in fourth place. It did not contest any further elections.
