= Zoran Talić =

Zoran Talić may refer to:

- Zoran Talić (politician) (born 1983), politician from Bosnia and Herzegovina
- Zoran Talić (athlete) (born 1990), athlete from Croatia
