= Civic Democratic Party (Bosnia and Herzegovina) =

Civic Democratic Party Građanska demokratska stranka
- Leader: Ibrahim Spahić
- Founded: 1990
- Headquarters: Maršala Tita 9a, 71000 Sarajevo
- Ideology: Social liberalism
- Colours: Blue, Yellow
- Ethnic group: multi-ethnic

Website
- www.gds.ba

The Civic Democratic Party (Bosnian: Građanska demokratska stranka, GDS) is a political party in Bosnia and Herzegovina.

== History ==
The party was founded in 1990 as the Democratic Socialist Alliance (Demokratski socijalistički savez, DSS) after the transformation of the previously largest political alliance Socialist Association of United Labour into political party. It contested the 1990 general elections both alone and in a coalition with the League of Socialist Youth and the Democratic Alliance of Greens, winning one seat in the House of Representatives.

In 1993 it was renamed the Civic Democratic Party. It lost its seat in the 1996 elections, receiving just 0.1% of the vote in the Federation of Bosnia and Herzegovina and 0.2% of the vote in Republika Srpska. The party was part of the Coalition for Unity and Democracy in the 1998 elections.

The 2000 elections saw the party's vote share fall below 0.5% in both sections of the country, as it remained seatless. It failed to win seats in the national parliament in 2002, but won a single seat in the House of Representatives of the Federation of Bosnia and Herzegovina. 2006 and 2010.
