= Democratic Alliance of Greens =

The Democratic Alliance of Greens (Bosnian: Demokratski savez Zelenih, DSZ) was a political party in Bosnia and Herzegovina.

== History ==
The DSZ contested the 1990 parliamentary elections in an alliance with the Democratic Socialist Alliance and the League of Socialist Youth, with the parties winning one seat each.
