= Muslim Bosniak Organisation =

Muslim Bosniak Organisation Muslimanska bošnjačka organizacija
- Founders: Adil Zulfikarpašić; Muhamed Filipović
- Founded: 1990
- Dissolved: 28 December 2009
- Headquarters: Sarajevo
- Ideology: Liberalism; Secularism; Anti-nationalism
- Political position: Big tent

The Muslim Bosniak Organisation (Bosnian: Muslimanska bošnjačka organizacija; abbr. MBO) was a mainly liberal political party in Bosnia and Herzegovina. It was founded by former Party of Democratic Action members Adil Zulfikarpašić and Muhamed Filipović.

== History ==
The Muslim Bosniak Organisation (MBO) was founded in 1990 by Adil Zulfikarpašić and Muhamed Filipović. The party was established shortly after Zulfikarpašić's and Filipović's political disagreements with Alija Izetbegović, the founder of the Party of Democratic Action. The MBO advocated the affirmation of the national name Bosniak instead of Muslim, liberalism, secularism and anti-nationalism.

The party first contested the 1990 general elections, receiving 1.15% of the national vote and winning two seats. In the 1996 general election it joined the Joint List alliance alongside the Social Democratic Party, the Union of Social Democrats, the Croatian Peasant Party and the Republican Party. Candidates for the Bosniak and Croat members of the Presidency, Sead Avdić and Ivo Komšić, were not elected. In the election for the national House of Representatives, the Joint List received 5.68% of the vote and won two of the 42 seats.

The MBO did not contest any further elections. The party was officially dissolved in December 2009.

== Elections ==
=== Parliamentary elections ===
Assembly of the Socialist Republic of Bosnia and Herzegovina
Year	#	Popular vote	%	Seats won	Government
1990	7th	25,975	1.15	2 / 240	Opposition

Parliamentary Assembly of Bosnia and Herzegovina
Year	#	Popular vote	%	HoR	Seat change	HoP	Seat change	Government
1996 (Note: Run as part of the Joint List.)	4th	136,203	5.68	0 / 42	New	0 / 15	New	Extra-parliamentary

=== Presidency elections ===
Presidency of Bosnia and Herzegovina
Election year	#	Candidate	Votes	%	Representing	Elected?
1996	2nd	Ivo Komšić (Note: Member of the HSS.)	37,684	10.1%	Croats	No
1996	4th	Sead Avdić (Note: Member of the SDP BiH.)	21,254	2.3%	Bosniaks	No
