= Joint List (Bosnia and Herzegovina) =

Bosnian political alliance

Joint List Združena lista Здружена листа
- Leader: Collective leadership
- Founded: 1996
- Dissolved: 1997
- Headquarters: Sarajevo
- Ideology: Liberalism; Secularism; Anti-nationalism; Pro-Europeanism Internal factions: Social democracy; Christian democracy
- Political position: Big tent

The Joint List of Bosnia and Herzegovina (Bosnian: Združena lista Bosne i Hercegovine / Здружена листа Босне и Херцеговине) was a liberal political alliance in Bosnia and Herzegovina, formed for the 1996 general election.

The alliance consisted of the Social Democratic Party, the Union of Social Democrats, the Croatian Peasant Party, the Muslim Bosniak Organisation and the Republican Party.

== History ==
Consisting of the Social Democratic Party, the Union of Social Democrats, the Croatian Peasant Party, the Muslim Bosniak Organisation and the Republican Party, the alliance contested the 1996 general election. It finished fourth with 5.68% of the vote, winning two of the 42 seats in the national House of Representatives. It won eleven of the 140 seats in the Federal House of Representatives. The alliance put forward Sead Avdić as its candidate for Bosniak member of the Presidency, but he finished fourth with just 2.33% of the vote. Its candidate for the Croat member, Ivo Komšić, finished second, but far behind winning candidate Krešimir Zubak.

The alliance was dissolved in 1997 and did not contest any further elections.

== Electoral results ==
=== Parliamentary Assembly of Bosnia and Herzegovina ===
Parliamentary Assembly of Bosnia and Herzegovina
| Year | # | Popular vote | % | HoR | Seat change | HoP | Seat change | Government |
|---|---|---|---|---|---|---|---|---|
| 1996 | 4th | 136,203 | 5.68 | 2 / 42 | New | 0 / 15 | New | Opposition |

=== Parliament of the Federation of Bosnia and Herzegovina ===
Parliament of the Federation of Bosnia and Herzegovina
| Year | # | Popular vote | % | HoR | Seat change | HoP | Seat change | Government |
|---|---|---|---|---|---|---|---|---|
| 1996 | 3rd | 105,897 | 7.93 | 11 / 140 | New | 4 / 65 | New | Opposition |

=== Presidency elections ===
Presidency of Bosnia and Herzegovina
| Election year | # | Candidate | Votes | % | Representing | Elected? |
|---|---|---|---|---|---|---|
| 1996 | 2nd | Ivo Komšić | 37,684 | 10.1% | Croats | No |
| 1996 | 4th | Sead Avdić | 21,254 | 2.3% | Bosniaks | No |
