= List of presidents of the People's Assembly of Bosnia and Herzegovina =

This article lists the presidents of the People's Assembly of Bosnia and Herzegovina.

== List ==
No.	Portrait	Name (Birth–Death)	Term of office		Party
Presidents of the People's Assembly of Bosnia and Herzegovina
1		Đuro Pucar (1899–1979)	December 1953	June 1963	SK BiH
2		Ratomir Dugonjić (1916–1987)	June 1963	1967	SK BiH
3		Džemal Bijedić (1917–1977)	1967	30 July 1971	SK BiH
4		Hamdija Pozderac (1924–1988)	30 July 1971	1978	SK BiH
5		Niko Mihaljević	1978	1981	SK BiH
6		Vaso Gačić	1981	1983	SK BiH
7		Ivica Blažević	1983	1984	SK BiH
8		Salko Oruč	1984	1987	SK BiH
9		Savo Čečur	1987	1989	SK BiH
10		Zlatan Karavdić	1989	20 December 1990	SK BiH
11		Momčilo Krajišnik (1945–2020)	20 December 1990	3 March 1992	SDS
Presidents of the Assembly of Bosnia and Herzegovina
1		Momčilo Krajišnik (1945–2020)	3 March 1992	29 October 1992	SDS
—		Abdulah Konjicija; Acting President	29 October 1992	25 December 1992	SDA
2		Miro Lazović (1954–)	25 December 1992	3 January 1997	SDP BiH

== See also ==
- Parliamentary Assembly of Bosnia and Herzegovina
