= Momčilo Krajišnik =

Bosnian Serb politician (1945–2020)

- Момчило Крајишник
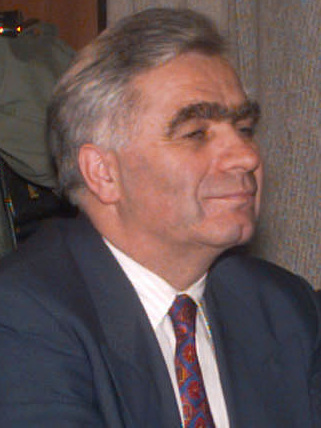
- Krajišnik in 1996

Serb member of the Presidency of Bosnia and Herzegovina
- In office 5 October 1996 – 13 October 1998
- Prime Minister: Hasan Muratović
- Preceded by: Tatjana Ljujić-Mijatović (as member of the Presidency of the Republic of Bosnia and Herzegovina)
- Succeeded by: Živko Radišić

Speaker of the National Assembly of Republika Srpska
- In office 24 October 1991 – 19 October 1996
- President: Radovan Karadžić Biljana Plavšić
- Preceded by: Office established
- Succeeded by: Dragan Kalinić

Speaker of the People's Assembly of SR Bosnia and Herzegovina
- In office 20 December 1990 – 3 March 1992
- President: Alija Izetbegović
- Prime Minister: Jure Pelivan
- Preceded by: Zlatan Karavdić
- Succeeded by: Mariofil Ljubić

Personal details
- Born: 20 January 1945 Sarajevo, PR Bosnia and Herzegovina, FPR Yugoslavia
- Died: 15 September 2020 (aged 75) Banja Luka, Bosnia and Herzegovina
- Party: Serb Democratic Party
- Education: University of Sarajevo (BEc, MEc)

Momčilo Krajišnik (Serbian Cyrillic: Момчило Крајишник; 20 January 1945 – 15 September 2020) was a Bosnian Serb political leader who was convicted for war crimes, and who along with Radovan Karadžić co-founded the Bosnian Serb nationalist Serb Democratic Party (SDS). Between 1990 and 1992, he was speaker of the National Assembly of Republika Srpska. Between June and December 1992, Krajišnik also served as a member of the expanded Presidency of Republika Srpska. After the Bosnian War, he was elected Serb member of the tripartite Presidency of Bosnia and Herzegovina in the September 1996 election and served in that post from October 1996 until October 1998. He lost his bid for re-election in the 1998 general election to Živko Radišić.

In 2006, Krajišnik was found guilty of committing crimes against humanity during the Bosnian War (1992–95) by the International Criminal Tribunal for the former Yugoslavia (ICTY) and was sentenced to 20 years in prison. He was later granted early release on 1 September 2013 and returned to Republika Srpska. Krajišnik died on 15 September 2020, in Banja Luka, as a result of complications caused by COVID-19.

== Early life ==
An ethnic Serb, Krajišnik was born in Zabrđe, a village near Sarajevo in central Bosnia and Herzegovina. He started his career at Energoinvest, where he became a finance executive and met Radovan Karadžić, a fellow employee.

== Political developments in Bosnia leading to the war ==
On 15 October 1991, the parliament of SR Bosnia and Herzegovina passed a resolution on the sovereignty of Bosnia and Herzegovina, in spite of strong opposition from Bosnian Serb deputies. Ten days later, the Serb Democratic Party (SDS) formed a Bosnian Serb Assembly, with Momčilo Krajišnik acting as its president. The Bosnian Serb Assembly began establishing parallel government structures.

== Participation in the Dayton negotiations ==
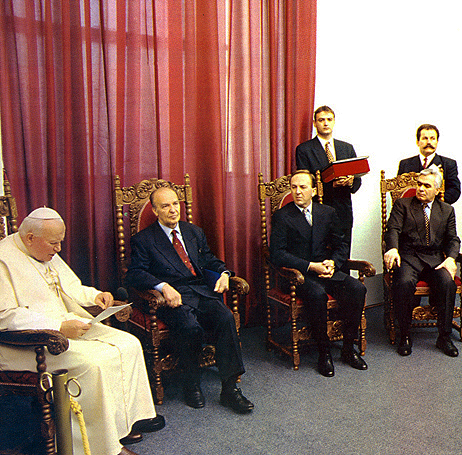
From left to right: Pope John Paul II, Alija Izetbegović, Krešimir Zubak (sitting) and Krajišnik, 12 April 1997

Krajišnik took part in the negotiations leading to the Dayton Agreement. He earned the nickname "Mr. No" for his uncompromising stance during negotiations. About that period, Richard Holbrooke noted in his memoirs:

As everybody who met him noted, Krajišnik had only one long and extraordinarily brushy eyebrow, which spanned his forehead, creating what looked like a permanent dark cloud over his deep-set eyes. Although Krajišnik had not been indicted by the War Crimes Tribunal – and could therefore participate in Dayton – it was hard to distinguish his views from those of his close friend Radovan Karadžić. Milošević had often said that Krajišnik was "more difficult" than Karadžić, but we had little basis on which to make an independent judgment. [...] He and Izetbegović knew each other well, from lengthy meetings in the Bosnian Assembly before the war. Krajišnik owned a five-hectare farm on the edge of Sarajevo, in an area that would probably revert to the Muslims in any settlement, and we often made bitter jokes that the war was really over Krajišnik's five hectares.

== Indictment by the ICTY and arrest ==
Krajišnik was indicted by the ICTY on various charges of crimes against humanity - namely extermination, murder, persecution, deportation, and forced transfer, murder as a war crime, and genocide - in relation to acts committed in 1992 in Bosnia and Herzegovina by Bosnian Serb forces. He was tracked by French intelligence special forces 13e RDP. He was arrested on 3 April 2000 at Pale by French SEALs Commando Hubert which were part of SFOR.

== Conviction by the ICTY ==
On 27 September 2006, Krajišnik was convicted of the following crimes against humanity: extermination, murder, persecution, deportation, and forced transfer. He was acquitted of the charges of murder as a war crime, genocide, and complicity in genocide. He was sentenced to 27 years imprisonment.

ICTY judges found that Krajišnik had been part of a joint criminal enterprise which carried out the extermination, murder, persecution and deportation of non-Serbs during the Bosnian war between 1992 and 1995.

Judge Alphons Orie observed that "Krajišnik's role in the commission of the crimes was crucial ... His positions within the Bosnian Serb leadership gave him the authority to facilitate the military, police and paramilitary groups to implement the objective of the joint criminal enterprise". He noted "Mr Krajišnik... accepted that a heavy price of suffering, death and destruction was necessary to achieve Serb domination."

Krajišnik was acquitted of genocide or complicity in genocide on the grounds that the court had found no evidence of a genocidal intent on his part to destroy in full or part ethnic or religious communities. This decision was greeted with anger by representatives of victims of crimes of which Krajišnik had been found guilty, who found his acquittal on the charge of genocide difficult to accept. Bakira Hasečić of the Association of Women Victims of War, an organisation which campaigns for the prosecution of those responsible for the use of rape as a weapon of war that was a feature of the ethnic cleansing campaign, commented that "The sentence is a major blow to justice. It is an insult for the victims."

On 17 March 2009, the charges of murder and extermination were dropped and the sentence was reduced to 20 years. While the ICTY judges found that while there was evidence that crimes committed in Bosnia constituted the criminal act of genocide (actus reus), they did not establish that the accused possessed genocidal intent, or was part of a criminal enterprise that had such an intent (mens rea).

According to Edina Bećirević, both Krajišnik and Radovan Karadžić were warned by Bosnian Serb military commander General Ratko Mladić, also indicted on genocide charges, that their "plans" [sic] could not be committed without committing genocide:

People are not little stones, or keys in someone's pocket, that can be moved from one place to another just like that. Therefore, we cannot precisely arrange for only Serbs to stay in one part of the country while removing others painlessly. I do not know how Mr Krajišnik and Mr Karadžić will explain that to the world. That is genocide.

== Imprisonment and release ==
In 2009, Krajišnik was transferred to the UK under the UK's enforcement agreements with the ICTY to serve his sentence at HM Prison Belmarsh. In 2010, after a single year in prison, he filed a request for early release, which was rejected, as in practice the ICTY considers early release only after two thirds of the original sentence is served, unlike the UK where it is often considered after only half of the sentence is served.

In 2011, another request for early release was made, according to Krajišnik's brother, Mirko, in response to a British government initiative. Krajišnik said that the ICTY had received a proposal from the UK's Ministry of Justice that Momčilo Krajišnik, as a person serving a sentence in the UK, should apply for premature release based on the fact that he had served half his sentence. He had at that point been in prison both at The Hague and then in the UK since 3 April 2000.

On 1 September 2013, he was released from prison and went back to Republika Srpska after being granted early release by ICTY President Theodor Meron, having served two thirds of his 20 year sentence. After arriving in Banja Luka, a government helicopter flew him home to his wartime stronghold of Pale, where thousands of people welcomed him home. His supporters arrived by bus from across Republika Srpska and convoys of cars were on the streets of Pale with people waving Serbian flags, honking horns, and stopping at the main square as Serb nationalist songs were played. He then told reporters: "It's like a dream. You have no idea how beautiful this country is". He added that he was surprised by his welcome, as "after all, I am 'a war criminal'".

== Death ==
On 29 August 2020, Krajišnik was taken to the Banja Luka hospital after it was confirmed that he tested positive for COVID-19, amid the COVID-19 pandemic in Bosnia and Herzegovina. The next day, on 30 August, his condition worsened and was put on a ventilator to help him breathe. Krajišnik died on 15 September 2020, in Banja Luka, as a result of complications caused by COVID-19.
