= 2012 Bosnian municipal elections =

- 7 October 2012

All 143 municipal/city mayors All 143 municipal/city councils
- Turnout: 56.51% (▲1.23 pp)
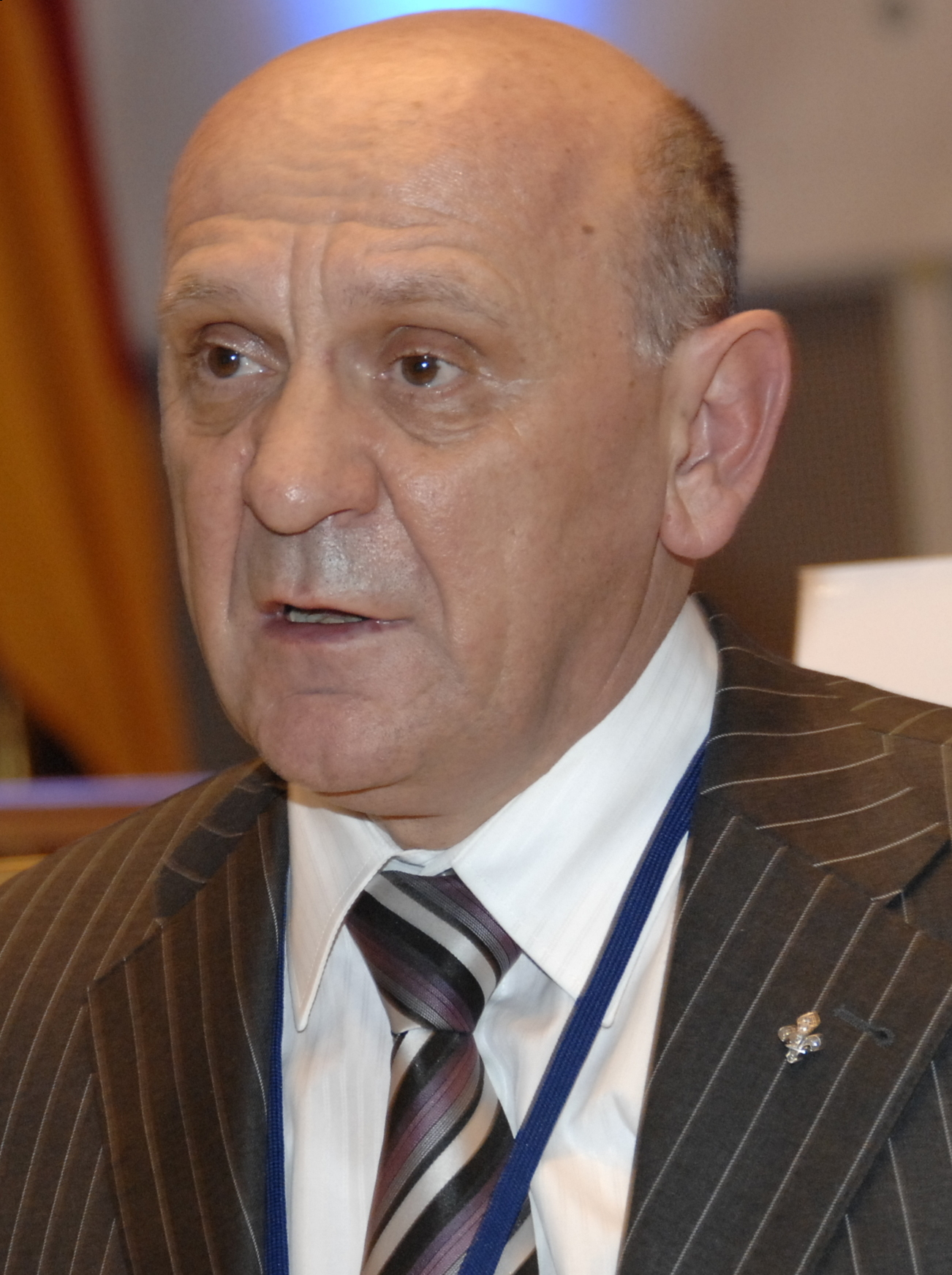

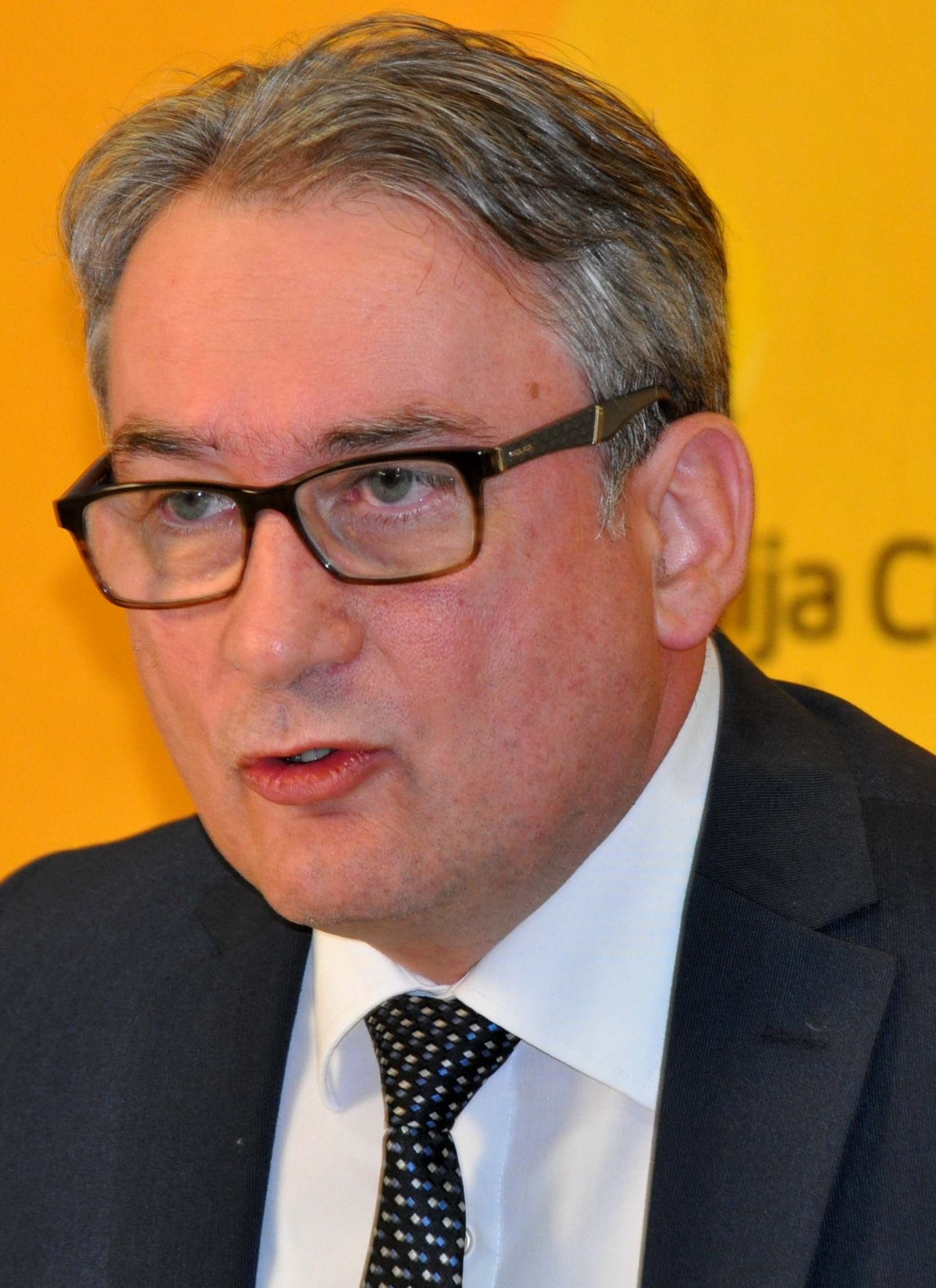

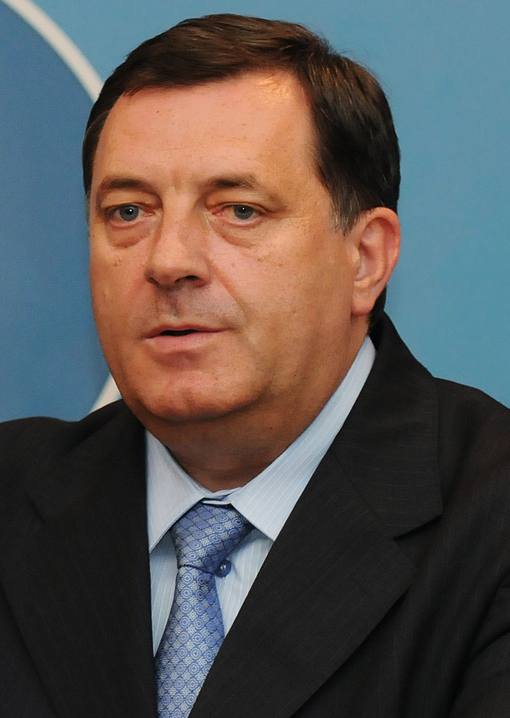

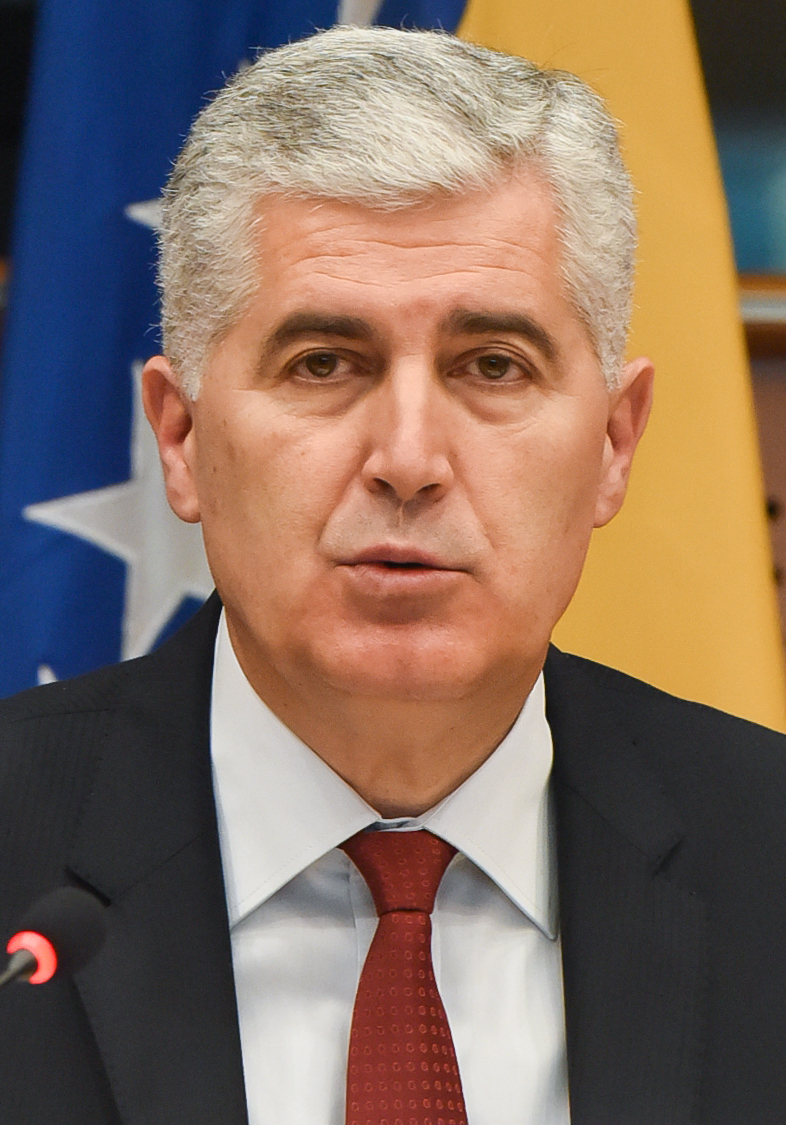

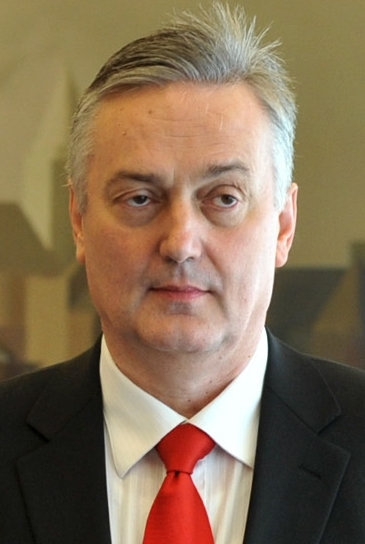
	First party	Second party	Third party
Leader	Sulejman Tihić	Mladen Bosić	Milorad Dodik
Party	SDA	SDS	SNSD
Mayors	37	32	20
Change	▼1	▲16	▼22
Percentage	25.87%	22.37%	13.98%
	Fourth party	Fifth party	Sixth party
			IND
Leader	Dragan Čović	Zlatko Lagumdžija	None
Party	HDZ BiH	SDP BiH	Independent
Mayors	14	10	5
Change	▼3	Steady	▲4
Percentage	9.79%	6.99%	3.49%
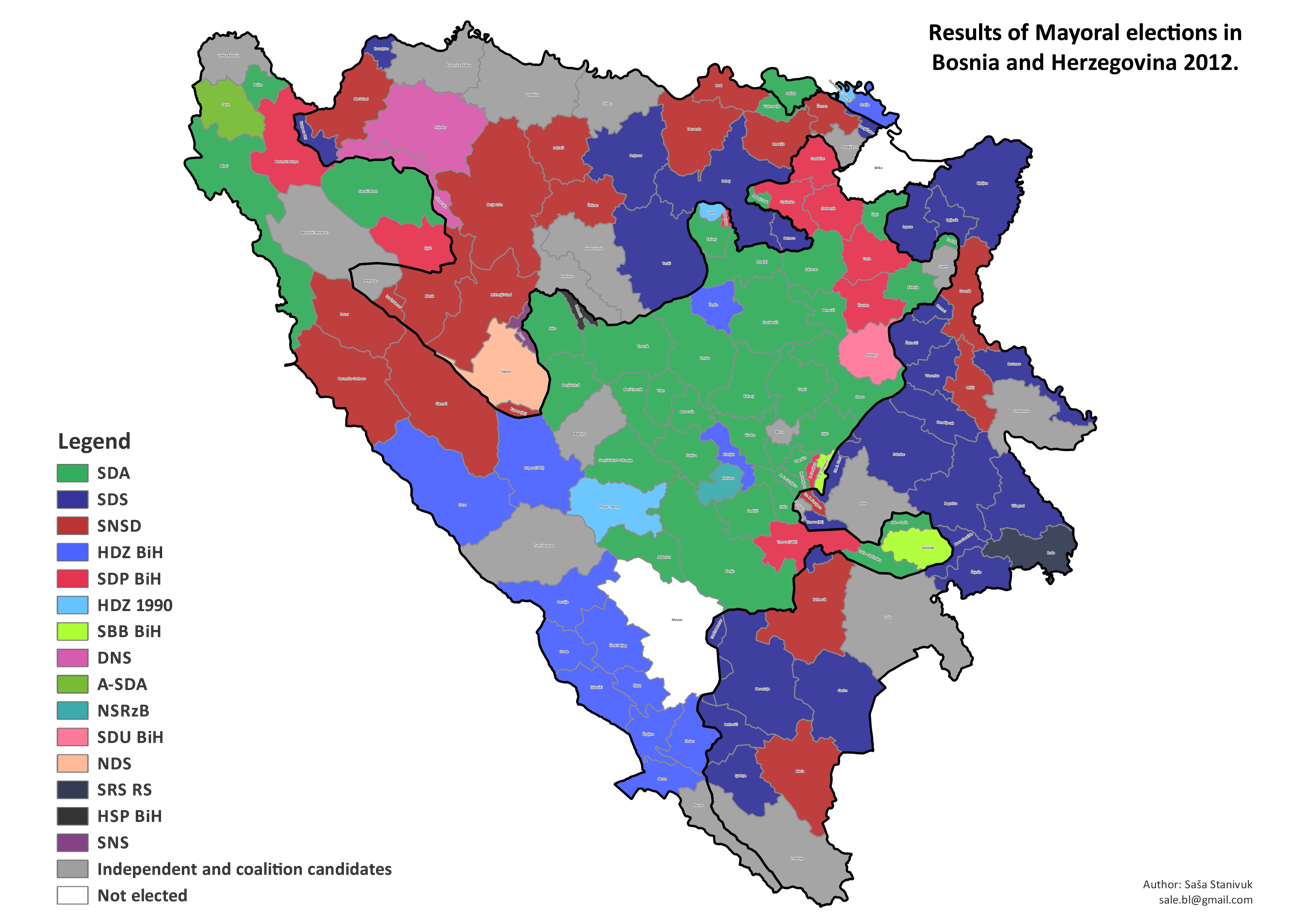
- Results by municipality.

Municipal elections were held in Bosnia and Herzegovina on 7 October 2012. Parties, independent candidates, party or coalition lists had to register by 25 May 2012. 87 political parties and 293 independent candidates were certified to stand in the election.

== Federation of Bosnia and Herzegovina ==
Municipality	Mayor's party
Banovići	Party of Democratic Action
Bihać	Party of Democratic Action
Bosanska Krupa	Social Democratic Party
Bosanski Petrovac	Independent
Bosansko Grahovo	Alliance of Independent Social Democrats
Breza	Independent
Bugojno	Independent
Busovača	Party of Democratic Action
Bužim	Party of Democratic Action
Čapljina	Croatian Democratic Union
Cazin	Party of Democratic Activity
Čelić	Party of Democratic Action
Centar, Sarajevo	Social Democratic Party
Čitluk	Croatian Democratic Union
Drvar	Alliance of Independent Social Democrats
Doboj East	Party of Democratic Action
Doboj South	Social Democratic Party
Dobretići	Croatian Party of Rights
Domaljevac-Šamac	Croatian Democratic Union 1990
Donji Vakuf	Party of Democratic Action
Foča-Ustikolina	Party of Democratic Action
Fojnica	Party of Democratic Action
Glamoč	Alliance of Independent Social Democrats
Goražde	Union for a Better Future
Gornji Vakuf-Uskoplje	Party of Democratic Action
Gračanica	Social Democratic Party
Gradačac	Social Democratic Party
Grude	Croatian Democratic Union
Hadžići	Party of Democratic Action
Ilidža	Party of Democratic Action
Ilijaš	Party of Democratic Action
Jablanica	Party of Democratic Action
Jajce	Party of Democratic Action
Kakanj	Party of Democratic Action
Kalesija	Party of Democratic Action
Kiseljak	Croatian Democratic Union
Kladanj	Social Democratic Union
Ključ	Social Democratic Party
Konjic	Party of Democratic Action
Kreševo	People's Party Work for Prosperity
Kupres	Croatian Democratic Union
Livno	Croatian Democratic Union
Ljubuški	Croatian Democratic Union
Lukavac	Party of Democratic Action
Maglaj	Party of Democratic Action
Neum	Croatian Democratic Union
Novi Grad, Sarajevo	Party of Democratic Action
Novo Sarajevo	Party of Democratic Action
Novi Travnik	Party of Democratic Action
Odžak	Party of Democratic Action
Olovo	Party of Democratic Action
Orašje	Croatian Democratic Union
Pale-Prača	Party of Democratic Action
Posušje	Croatian Democratic Union
Prozor-Rama	Croatian Democratic Union 1990
Ravno	Croatian coalition (HDZ, HDZ 1990)
Sanski Most	Party of Democratic Action
Sapna	Independent
Sarajevo	Social Democratic Union
Široki Brijeg	Croatian Democratic Union
Srebrenik	Social Democratic Party
Stari Grad, Sarajevo	Union for a Better Future
Stolac	Croatian Democratic Union
Teočak	Party of Democratic Action
Tešanj	Party of Democratic Action
Tomislavgrad	Croatian coalition
Travnik	Party of Democratic Action
Trnovo (FBiH)	Social Democratic Party
Tuzla	Social Democratic Party
Usora	Croatian Democratic Union 1990
Vareš	Party of Democratic Action
Velika Kladuša	Independent
Visoko	Party of Democratic Action
Vitez	Party of Democratic Action
Vogošća	Party of Democratic Action
Zavidovići	Party of Democratic Action
Zenica	Party of Democratic Action
Žepče	Croatian Democratic Union
Živinice	Social Democratic Party

== Assembly of Brčko District ==
Constituency	Council				Mayor elected by Council		
Constituency	Party	Popular vote	%	Seats	Mayor	Votes	%
Brčko	Social Democratic Party	6,244	15.41	6	Anto Domić, HDZ	19	61%
Brčko	SNSD—DNS	5,216	12.87	4			
Brčko	Serb Democratic Party	4,672	11.53	4			
Brčko	Union for a Better Future	4,496	11.09	3			
Brčko	Party of Democratic Action	3,985	9.83	3			
Brčko	SP—DP—PUP	3,508	8.66	3			
Brčko	Croatian Democratic Union	2,997	7.39	2			
Brčko	Croatian Peasant Party of Stjepan Radić	2,409	5.94	2			
Brčko	Party for Bosnia and Herzegovina	2,176	5.37	2			
Brčko	PDP—SNS	2,063	5.09	2			
Total		42,383		31			
