= Zoran Talić (politician) =

Zoran Talić Зоран Талић
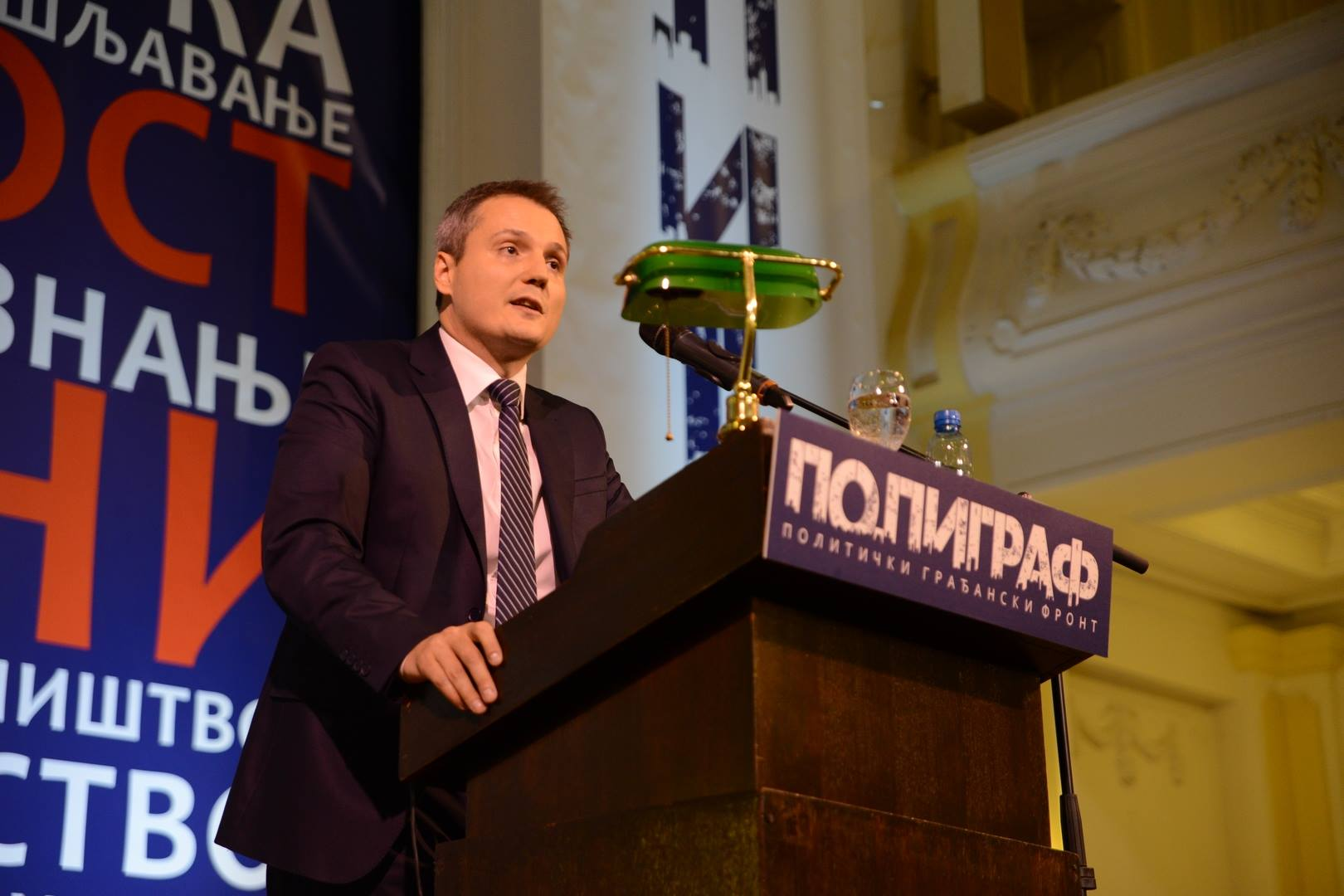

Chairman of the Assembly of the City of Banja Luka
- In office 20 July 2017 – 5 January 2021
- Preceded by: Budimir Balaban
- Succeeded by: Mladen Ilić

Personal details
- Born: 30 January 1983 (age 43) Banja Luka
- Party: Civil political front "POLIGRAPH"

Zoran Talić (Serbian: Зоран Талић) is a Bosnian Serb politician who served as Chairman of the Assembly of the City of Banja Luka from 20 July 2017 until 5 January 2021.

He was born in Banja Luka on 30 January 1983, where he attended elementary and high school, and graduated from the Law Faculty. He worked at the Pension Fund of the Republic of Srpska until 2013, after which he started engaging in the position of procurator in the consulting company "Intervent", where he cooperated with domestic and foreign businessmen.

He was a candidate for councilor in the Banja Luka City Assembly several times, as well as a candidate for deputy in the National Assembly of the Republic of Srpska. For the first time, he was elected a city councilor at the 2008 municipal elections, getting re-elected in 2012, and elected again in 2016. He became Chairman of the Assembly of the City of Banja Luka in July 2017.

Talić is married and has a son and a daughter.
