= Social Democratic Union of Bosnia and Herzegovina =

Social Democratic Union of Bosnia and Herzegovina Socijaldemokratska unija Bosne i Hercegovine
- President: Nermin Pećanac
- Secretary-General: Esad Piknjać
- Founded: 2002
- Dissolved: 2018
- Split from: Social Democratic Party
- Merged into: Independent Bosnian-Herzegovinian List
- Headquarters: Soukbunar 7, 71000 Sarajevo
- Youth wing: Organization of Youth SDU BiH
- Membership: 10,000
- Ideology: Social democracy Secularism; Pro-Europeanism; Civic nationalism
- Political position: Centre-left
- European affiliation: Party of European Socialists (associate)
- International affiliation: Socialist International
- Colours: Yellow

Website
- www.sdu.ba

The Social Democratic Union of Bosnia and Herzegovina (Bosnian: Socijaldemokratska unija Bosne i Hercegovine, SDU BiH) was a plural social-democratic political party in Bosnia and Herzegovina. In 2018 it merged into Independent BH List.

After a slow start in political activity in the first years after its foundation in 2002, the SDU has had a remarkable growth both in terms of members and importance on the political stage of Bosnia-Herzegovina in recent years. Its most successful year was in 2012 when it won a record number of seats in the local elections.

Their success continued as their chair member Dr. Ivo Komšić got elected as Mayor of Sarajevo on 27 March 2013.

== History ==
The SDU BiH was set up with the goal of overriding serious weaknesses of social democracy and the crisis in social democratic establishment in Bosnia-Herzegovina. After the general elections of 2002 a group of high-ranking officials of Social Democratic party (SDP) after struggle to reform the rigid views on political and organization issues in SDP, decided to leave the party and formed a new political party – Social Democratic union of BIH. The main idea of founding SDU BiH was to preserve and affirm Bosnia and Herzegovina as a sovereign, constitutional, democratic state whose borders are inviolable, whose life space was ethnical inseparable, and whose prosperity was in The European Union and in Euro-Atlantic integration.

SDU's main political activities and aims were in the development of constitutional democracy, affirmation of constitutional patriotism and the cherishing of cultural, religious and national identities of all Bosnian-Herzegovinian citizens. They are supported an idea of stronger political identification with Bosnia and Herzegovina as a homeland for all nationals of the country.

The presidency and upper leadership of the party consisted of prominent Bosnian personalities from the political sphere of Bosnia and Herzegovina. Some of the members included Stjepan Kljuić, Nijaz Duraković, Ivo Komšić, Miro Lazović and Emir Zlatar.
