= Radical Party of Republika Srpska =

The Radical Party of Republika Srpska (Serbian: Radikalna stranka Republike Srpske, RS) was a political party in the Republika Srpska area of Bosnia and Herzegovina.

== History ==
The party first contested national elections in 1998, when it received 1.6% of the national vote, winning won one seat in the national House of Representatives and three seats in the National Assembly of Republika Srpska. In the 2000 parliamentary elections its vote share fell to just 0.3%. resulting in the party losing its seats in both parliaments. It did not contest any further elections.
