= Democratic Party of Pensioners =

Political party in Bosnia and Herzegovina

The Democratic Party of Pensioners (Bosnian: Demokratska stranka penzionera, DSP) was a centre-left political party in Bosnia and Herzegovina led by Alojz Knezović.

== History ==
The party contested the 1998 general election, although only running in the Federation of Bosnia and Herzegovina. It received 0.8% of the national vote, failing to win a seat. However, it did win two seats in the House of Representatives of the Federation of Bosnia and Herzegovina.

In the 2000 parliamentary election the party increased its vote share to 1.1.% and won a single seat. It also won a single seat in the Federation's House of Representatives.
