= Democratic Socialist Party (Bosnia and Herzegovina) =

Political party in Bosnia and Herzegovina

The Democratic Socialist Party (Serbian: Demokratska socijalistička partija, DSP) was a political party in the Republika Srpska part of Bosnia and Herzegovina.

== History ==
The party contested the 2000 parliamentary elections, forming an alliance with the Alliance of Independent Social Democrats at the national level, but contesting the elections to the National Assembly of Republika Srpska alone. The joint list received 4.5% of the vote in the elections for the national House of Representatives, winning one seat. In Republika Srpska the party won four seats in the National Assembly.

In 2002 the party merged into the Alliance of Independent Social Democrats.
