= Stjepan Kljuić =

Bosnian Croat politician and academic (born 1939)

Croat member of the Presidency of the Republic of Bosnia and Herzegovina
- In office 20 December 1990 – 5 October 1996 Serving with Franjo Boras (1990–1993); Ivo Komšić (1993–1996)
- Preceded by: Office established
- Succeeded by: Krešimir Zubak
Additional positions
President of the Olympic Committee of Bosnia and Herzegovina
In office 1992–1997
Preceded by	Office established
Succeeded by	Bogić Bogićević
President of the Croatian Democratic Union
In office 7 September 1990 – 2 February 1992
Preceded by	Davorin Perinović
Succeeded by	Milenko Brkić

Personal details
- Born: 19 December 1939 (age 86) Sarajevo, Kingdom of Yugoslavia
- Party: Union of Social Democrats (2013–2014)
- Other political affiliations: Social Democratic Union (2002–2013); Republican Party (1994–2002); Croatian Democratic Union (1990–1994)

Stjepan Kljuić (born 19 December 1939) is a Bosnian Croat former politician who served as the Croat member of the Presidency of the Republic of Bosnia and Herzegovina from 1990 to 1996, most of it during the Bosnian War. He was the first president of the Olympic Committee of Bosnia and Herzegovina from 1992 to 1997.

Kljuić founded and served, from 1990 to 1992, as the first president of the Croatian Democratic Union (HDZ BiH). He left the HDZ BiH in 1994, having been strongly opposed to the party's stance on the war in Bosnia and Herzegovina.

== Career ==
Kljuić was the Croat member of the Presidency of the Republic of Bosnia and Herzegovina and a founding member of the Croatian Democratic Union (HDZ BiH) party in 1990. He served as the president of the HDZ BiH and protested that Croats should support the elected government of Alija Izetbegović.

The central HDZ leadership in Zagreb pressured the local leadership in Herzeg-Bosnia to depose him of his leadership position. He was replaced with Milenko Brkić.

Upon founding the Olympic Committee of Bosnia and Herzegovina in 1992, Kljuić was elected its first president. He left the HDZ BiH in 1994, angered with the party turning on their Bosniak allies during the Bosnian War, a decision which would escalate into a separate war between them. Kljuić then founded his own party, the Republican Party, a multi-ethnic, pro-Bosnian party. He stood as the party's candidate for the Croat member of the Presidency in the 2002 general election, but failed to be elected.

Later, Kljuić took part in the ICTY proceedings.

Party political offices
Preceded by Davorin Perinović	President of the Croatian Democratic Union; 1990–1992	Succeeded by Milenko Brkić
