= Gradimir Gojer =

Bosnian theater director and writer (born 1951)

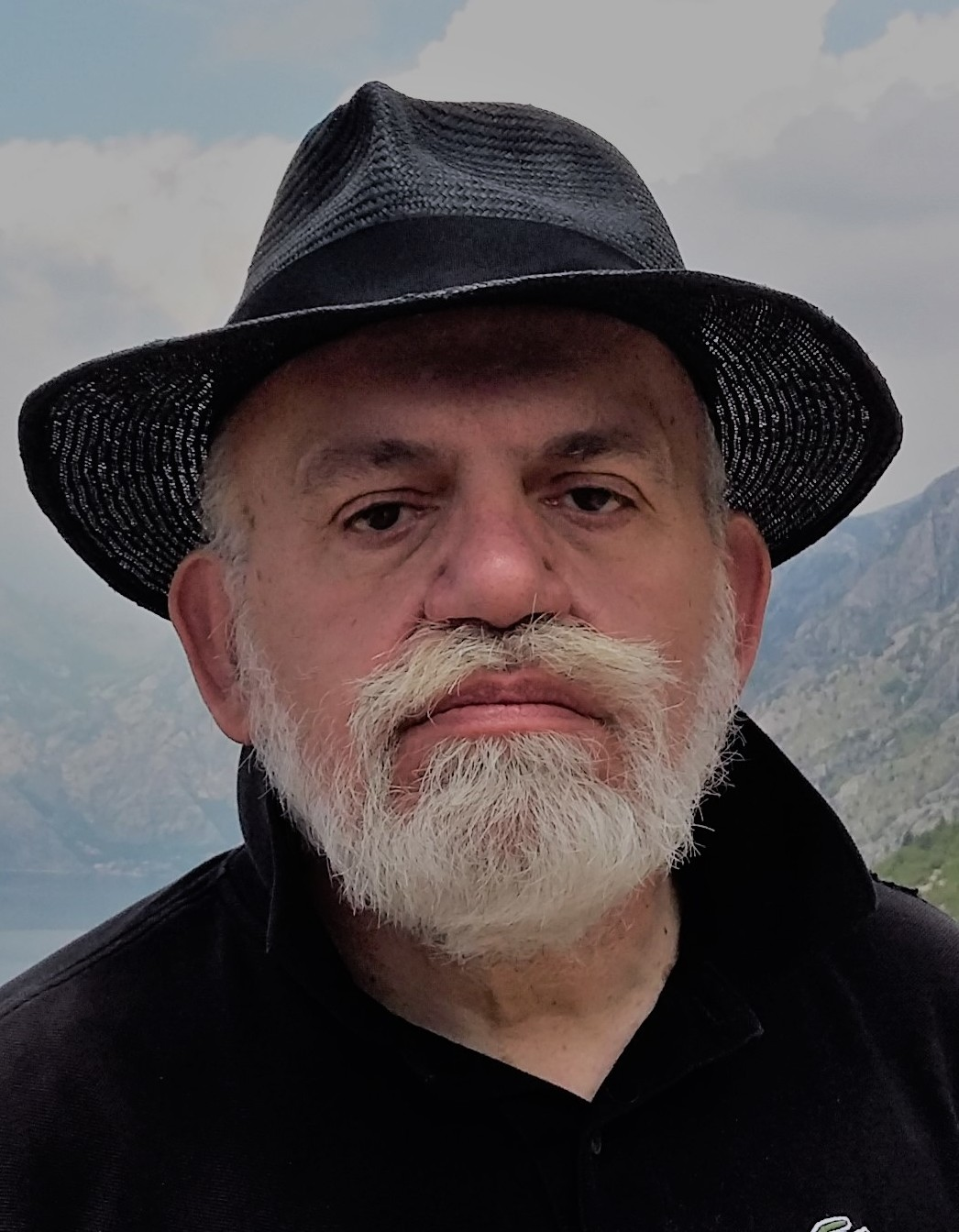
Gradimir Gojer

Gradimir Gojer (born 4 March 1951) is a Bosnian theater director and writer who was born in Mostar.

== Biography ==
He studied and earned a degree in directing and literature from the University of Sarajevo. He has directed in some of the largest Bosnian theaters and many of the regional ones, such as in Belgrade, Serbia; Bitola, Macedonia and Split, Croatia.

He has received a number of awards at various international theater festivals and served as vice president of the Social Democratic Party of Bosnia and Herzegovina. During the Siege of Sarajevo (1992–1996), he remained in the city and continued working prolifically in the theater scene. He worked for the organization of the Sarajevo War Theater in addition to serving as a director and art manager of Kamerni Theatre 55. He was also a minister in the Bosnian government and recipient of the International Peace Center award for his artistic accomplishments.

Gojer is a regular commentator on political events in Bosnia and Herzegovina and publishes news and opinion columns for local and regional publications.
