= Krešimir Zubak =

Bosnian Croat politician (born 1947)

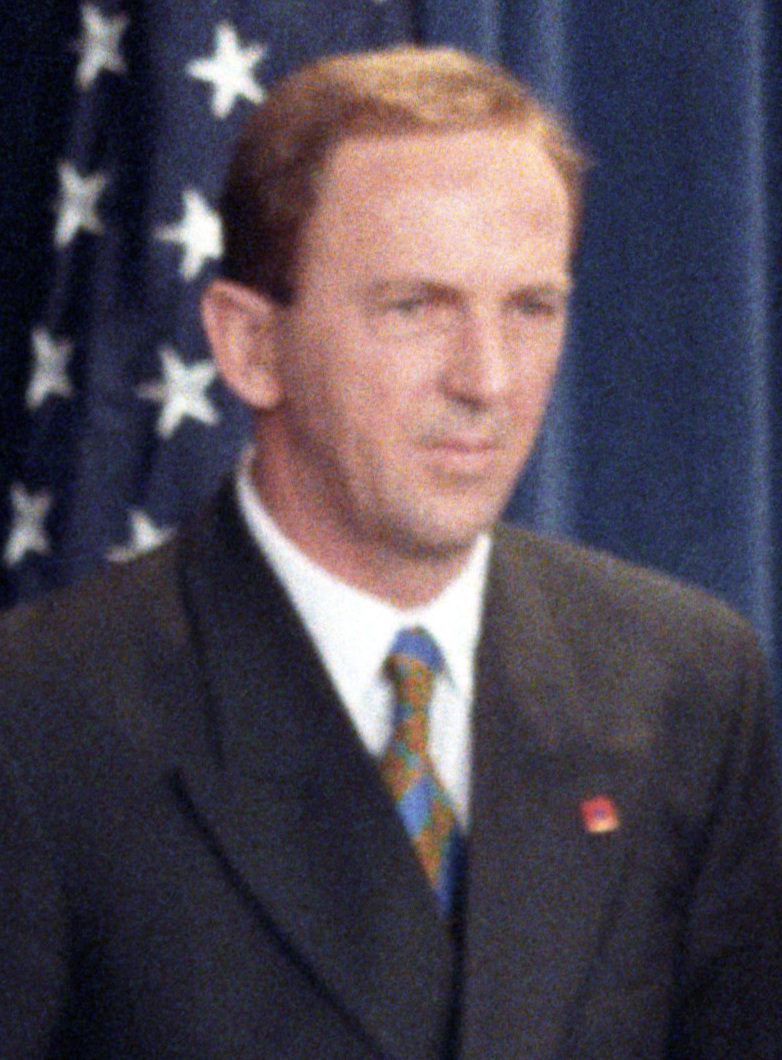
- Zubak in 1994

Croat member of the Presidency of Bosnia and Herzegovina
- In office 5 October 1996 – 15 November 1998
- Preceded by: Stjepan Kljuić; Ivo Komšić (as members of the Presidency of the Republic of Bosnia and Herzegovina)
- Succeeded by: Ante Jelavić

President of the Federation of Bosnia and Herzegovina
- In office 31 May 1994 – 18 March 1997
- Prime Minister: Haris Silajdžić; Izudin Kapetanović
- Vice President: Ejup Ganić
- Preceded by: Office established
- Succeeded by: Vladimir Šoljić

President of Herzeg-Bosnia
- In office 4 April 1994 – 14 August 1996
- Prime Minister: Jadranko Prlić; Pero Marković
- Vice President: Dario Kordić
- Preceded by: Mate Boban
- Succeeded by: Office abolished
Ministerial offices
Minister of Human Rights and Refugees
In office 22 February 2001 – 23 December 2002
| Prime Minister | Božidar Matić; Zlatko Lagumdžija; Dragan Mikerević |
| Preceded by | Martin Raguž |
| Succeeded by | Mirsad Kebo |

Personal details
- Born: 25 January 1947 (age 79) Doboj, SR Bosnia and Herzegovina, SFR Yugoslavia
- Party: New Croatian Initiative (1998−2007)
- Other political affiliations: Croatian Democratic Union (1992−1998)
- Children: 2
- Education: University of Sarajevo (LLB)
- Awards: Grand Order of Queen Jelena

Krešimir Zubak (Croatian pronunciation: [krěʃimir zûbaːk]; born 25 January 1947) is a Bosnian Croat politician who served as the first Croat member of the Presidency of Bosnia and Herzegovina from 1996 to 1998. He previously served as the first president of the Federation of Bosnia and Herzegovina from 1994 to 1997.

Zubak worked as a lawyer prior to the start of the Bosnian War in 1992, when he entered into politics. After Mate Boban left the position of president of the Croatian Republic of Herzeg-Bosnia in 1994, Zubak succeeded him. Under Zubak, the Croatian Defence Council and the Army of the Republic of Bosnia and Herzegovina established peaceful relations and the Washington Agreement was signed. He would then serve as the inaugural president of the newly created Federation of Bosnia and Herzegovina entity, before being elected to the Bosnian Presidency in the first post-war general election in September 1996. He later served as minister of Human Rights and Refugees from 2001 to 2002.

Zubak joined the Croatian Democratic Union (HDZ BiH) in 1992. He left the HDZ BiH in 1998 following internal disagreements, and formed the New Croatian Initiative.

== Early life and career ==
Krešimir Zubak was born on 25 January 1947 in Doboj. He graduated from the Faculty of Law in Sarajevo in 1970. For the next few years, he worked as a lawyer in a construction company, after which he began a judicial career. Zubak started his judicial career as Deputy Public Prosecutor in Doboj, after which he became President of the District Court in Doboj. From 1980 to 1984, he was deputy minister of justice in the Socialist Republic of Bosnia and Herzegovina. After that, Zubak was president of the High Court in Doboj until 1992.

== Wartime political career ==
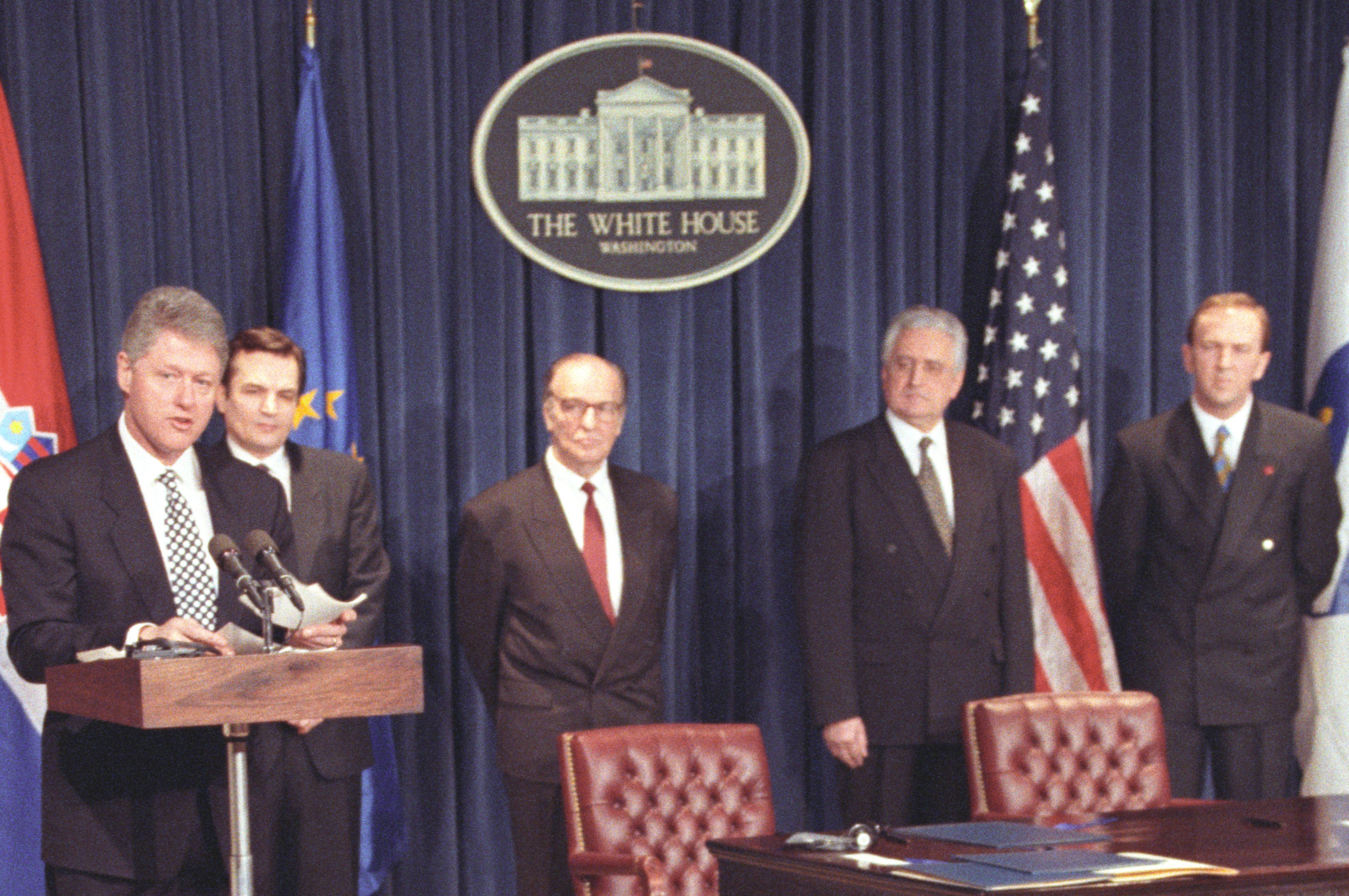
Zubak (far right) during the signing of the Washington Agreement, 18 March 1994

Before the start of the Bosnian War, Zubak was re-employed at the Ministry of Justice, but returned home after Serb forces attacked the village of Usora. He was severely wounded during an unsuccessful operation to liberate Doboj, that is, to occupy the strategically important Putnik Hill. The bullet went between his chest and armpits and erupted outside in the lower spine. Because of that wound, Zubak became 40% disabled, and underwent surgery at a local hospital in Tešanj. His family was soon expelled from Doboj, and he went into exile in Vodice near Šibenik, Croatia. Zubak soon went to Herzegovina, while the rest of his family, his wife and two sons, went to Zagreb, where his sons graduated with law degrees.

After arriving to Herzegovina, he was appointed minister of justice in the government of Herzeg-Bosnia. He is a signatorie of the Washington Agreement, signed on 18 March 1994. After then president of Herzeg-Bosnia, Mate Boban, resigned as president in Livno on 4 April 1994, Zubak was elected as his successor. The following month, on 31 May, he was elected the first president of the Federation of Bosnia and Herzegovina at the Constituent Assembly of the office of president of the Federation of Bosnia and Herzegovina.

Zubak participated in the negotiations on the conclusion of the Dayton Agreement. He finally signed the agreement on 14 December 1995.

== Post-war political career ==
Zubak signed the Saint Petersburg Agreement with Ejup Ganić in 1996, which he considered a continuation of the previously signed Dayton Agreement. In it, Zubak and Ganić agreed on the gradual exclusion of the institutions of Herzeg-Bosnia and the Republic of Bosnia and Herzegovina, which was supposed to guarantee the federal character of the Federation. The agreement was criticized by former prime minister Haris Silajdžić, and it ultimately failed.

In the 1996 general election held in September, Zubak was the Croatian Democratic Union (HDZ BiH) candidate for the Croat seat in the Presidency of Bosnia and Herzegovina. He managed to win the election with 330,477 (88.7%) votes. His strongest opponent was Ivo Komšić, candidate of the Joint List coalition.

Zubak left the HDZ BiH in 1998 and established the New Croatian Initiative (NHI). He welcomed Barry's amendments to the Rules and Regulations of the Provisional Election Commission, which allowed members of the Federal House of Peoples, regardless of their nationality, to be nominated and elected by all members of the Cantonal Assemblies. This made it possible for Croat members to be elected by Bosniaks. Following the 2000 parliamentary election, Zubak's NHI joined the ruling civic-unitary coalition of the Alliance for Change, led by the Social Democratic Party, where he was appointed minister of Human Rights and Refugees on 22 February 2001. The coalition was ousted from power after the 2002 general election. The NHI did not achieve significant political success, and after a significant weakening, it merged with the Croatian Peasant Party (HSS BiH) to form the HSS-NHI in October 2007. Although, the HSS-NHI, later renamed the Croatian National Alliance of Bosnia and Herzegovina, failed to make any significant political success.

After the 2010 general election, Zubak supported the creation of the so-called platform government of the Federation of Bosnia and Herzegovina without the presence of Croat legitimate representatives. When the Croatian Democratic Union 1990 (HDZ 1990) refused to join such a government, which included its coalition partner, the Croatian Party of Rights of Bosnia and Herzegovina (HSP BiH), Zubak claimed that the HDZ 1990 was "committing political suicide." Later, the Croatian National Alliance of Bosnia and Herzegovina merged in to the HDZ 1990, and the party leadership was co-opted into the HDZ 1990 leadership, while Zubak himself withdrew from further political life.

== Honours and decorations ==
=== International ===
| Award or decoration | Country | Awarded by | Year | Place |
|---|---|---|---|---|
| Grand Order of Queen Jelena | Croatia | Franjo Tuđman | 1995 | Zagreb |
