= Ibrahim Spahić =

Bosnian politician (born 1952)

Personal details
- Born: 10 May 1952 (age 74) Sarajevo
- Party: Civic Democratic Party

Ibrahim Spahić (born 10 May 1952 in Sarajevo) is the president and director of the X Biennial of Young Artist of Europe and the Mediterranean.

== Life and career ==
Spahić finished high school and graduated from the Faculty of Philosophy of Sarajevo University with a Bachelor of comparative and theatrologist.

President and Director of the X Biennial of Young Artist of Europe and the Mediterranean 2,001st the first president of the Association of Young Artists of Europe and the Mediterranean for the period 2001-2007.

Representative in the SRBiH was from 1974 until 1978. The Commissioner of the Foreign Relations and from 1974 to 1980. President of the Student Association and a member of the Presidency of the Union of students and youth in the republic and federal level. The student of European and world forum on youth from 1968 to 1978.

He was a member of the House of Representatives of the Parliamentary Assembly since 1998. In the 2000s, he had the duty of the first deputy chairman of the Foreign Affairs, particularly engaged in the development of parliamentary diplomacy. He led a parliamentary delegation at international conferences.

In 2000, Ibrahim Spahić was awarded a Special Mention by the Jury of the Europe Theatre Prize, «for his role in the desperate days of Sarajevo at war».

He was a delegate in the House of Peoples of the Parliamentary Assembly since 2000 to 2002. He was President of the Constitutional Commission and President of the Parliamentary Assembly of BiH delegation in Interparlamentary Union. He has performed on behalf of the IPU Conference in Berlin, Jakarta, Amman, Burkina Faso, then to Paris, London, Bled, Ohrid and other bilateral and multilateral meetings of parliamentarians.

He was President of the Commission for the development of cultural strategies in the BiH Council of Ministers, which was adopted in September 2008 at the Council of Ministers.

President and organizer of the International Festival Sarajevo "Sarajevo Winter" and as a volunteer, chairman of the International Centre for Peace, Association of Publishers and Booksellers of Bosnia and Herzegovina and the house of Europe, Sarajevo. Initiator of the project Sarajevo - the cultural center of Europe 93/94. Coordinator of Sarajevo, the first intercultural City Council of Europe 2003/2004.

He is the author of papers on foreign policy and human rights, culture and art. He participated in many international cultural and scientific conferences and congresses. The organizer of the workshops and international seminars, and lectured at numerous stands. The organizer of the Conference of Mayors, mayors and civil society in cooperation with the Council of Europe.

He was President of the European Organizing Committee of the Council of Europe campaign to raise awareness and promote multi-ethnic society and democratic citizenship for all Link Diversity in south-eastern Europe and the Executive Director of the Culture Committee of the Council of Europe. He was a member of the International Forum Ibn Arabi for intercultural and interreligious dialogue (Madrid), as well as many international organizations.

He was a member of the Executive Committee of the European Festivals Association and the President of the Foundation Kulin Ban.

He is Chairman of the Board of Directors of the Cultural Forum of BiH and the EC of the European Cultural Forum and the Executive Committee BJCM. He is an honorary member of PEN Center and the Society of Architects of Bosnia and Herzegovina Sarajevo.

In 2017, he signed the Declaration on the Common Language of the Croats, Serbs, Bosniaks and Montenegrins.

== Bibliography ==
Author of the Parliamentary Assembly of BiH (1998–2002), the book PS BiH, the book" Citizens 'provocation' and poetry book Sign, Man of the wire spider Sarajevo, editor and publisher of monographs, "20 years of the Sarajevo Winter" Book Link Diversity on the future of BiH and BiH anthologies. poetry "Harp"
