= 1996 Bosnian general election =

- 14 September 1996
- Turnout: 80.42% (presidential) ▲6.00 pp 79.40% (parliamentary) ▲1.91 pp
- Bosniak member of the Presidency
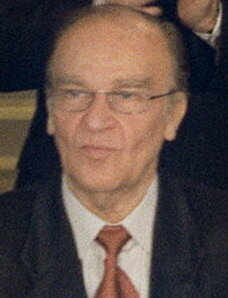

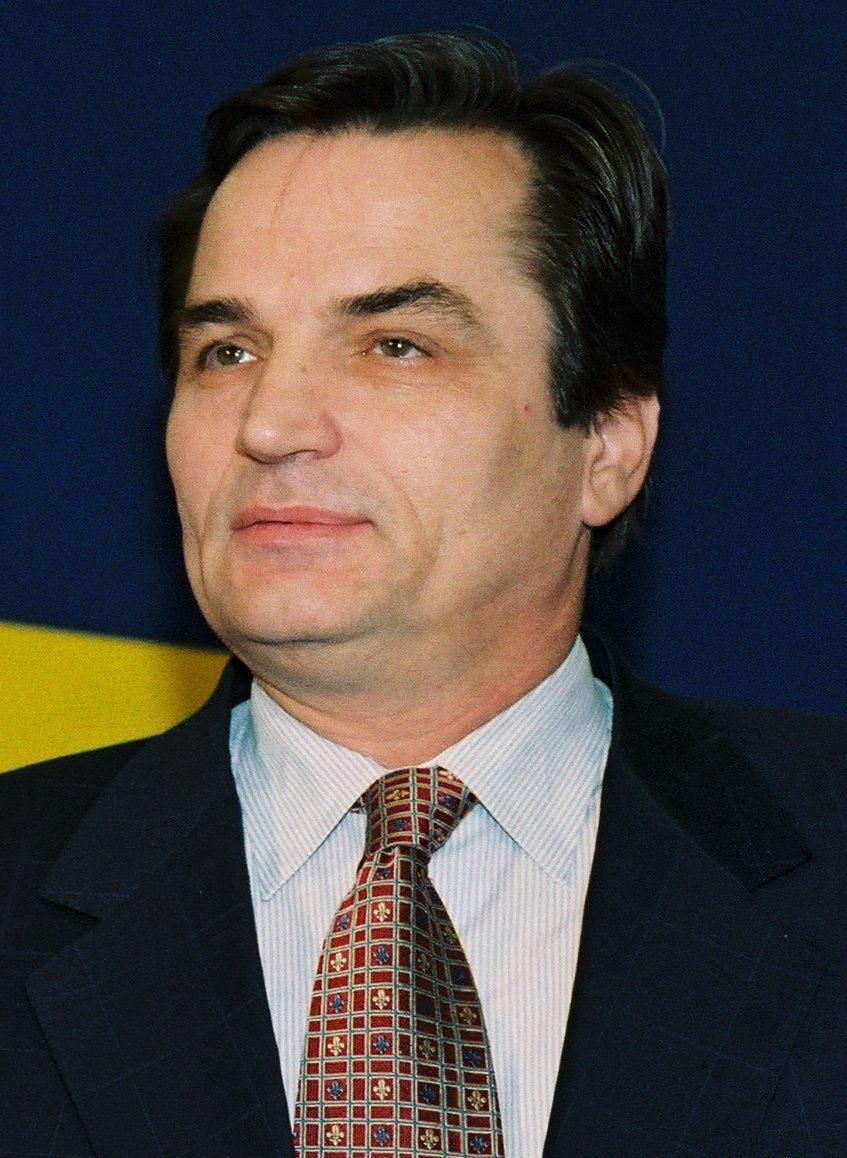
Candidate	Alija Izetbegović	Haris Silajdžić
Party	SDA	SBiH
Popular vote	730,592	124,396
Percentage	80.00%	13.62%
- Croat member of the Presidency
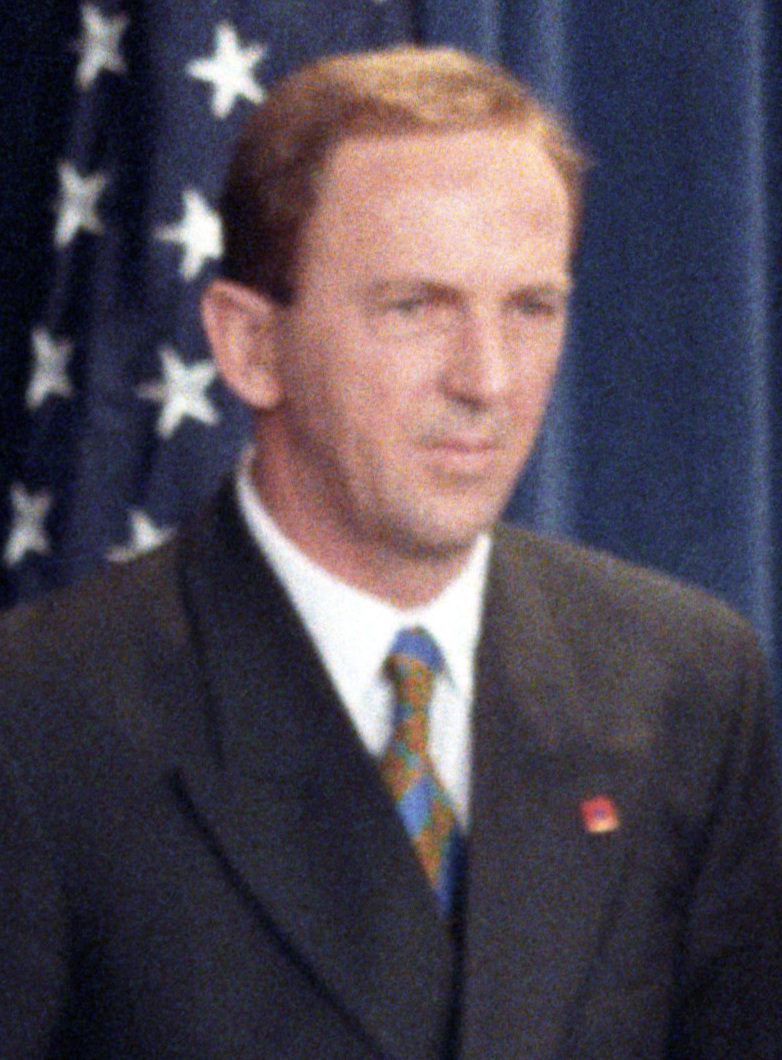

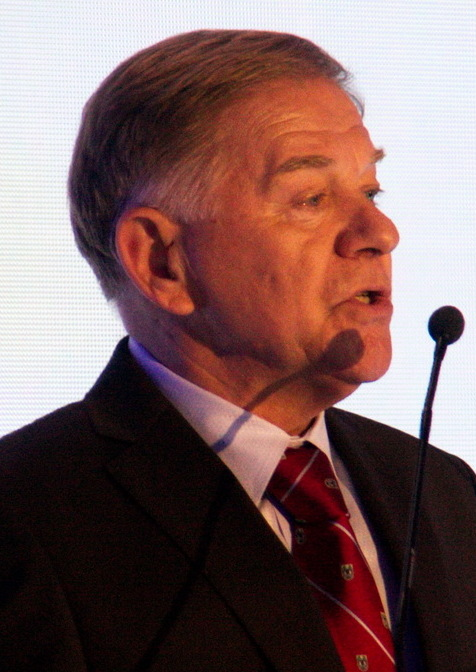
Candidate	Krešimir Zubak	Ivo Komšić
Party	HDZ BiH	Joint List
Popular vote	330,477	37,684
Percentage	88.70%	10.11%
- Serb member of the Presidency
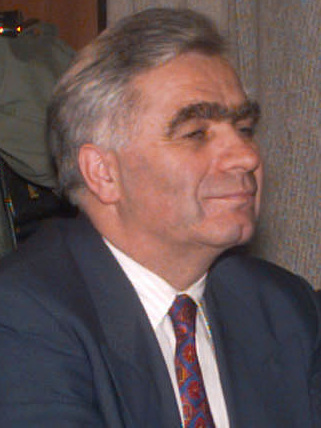

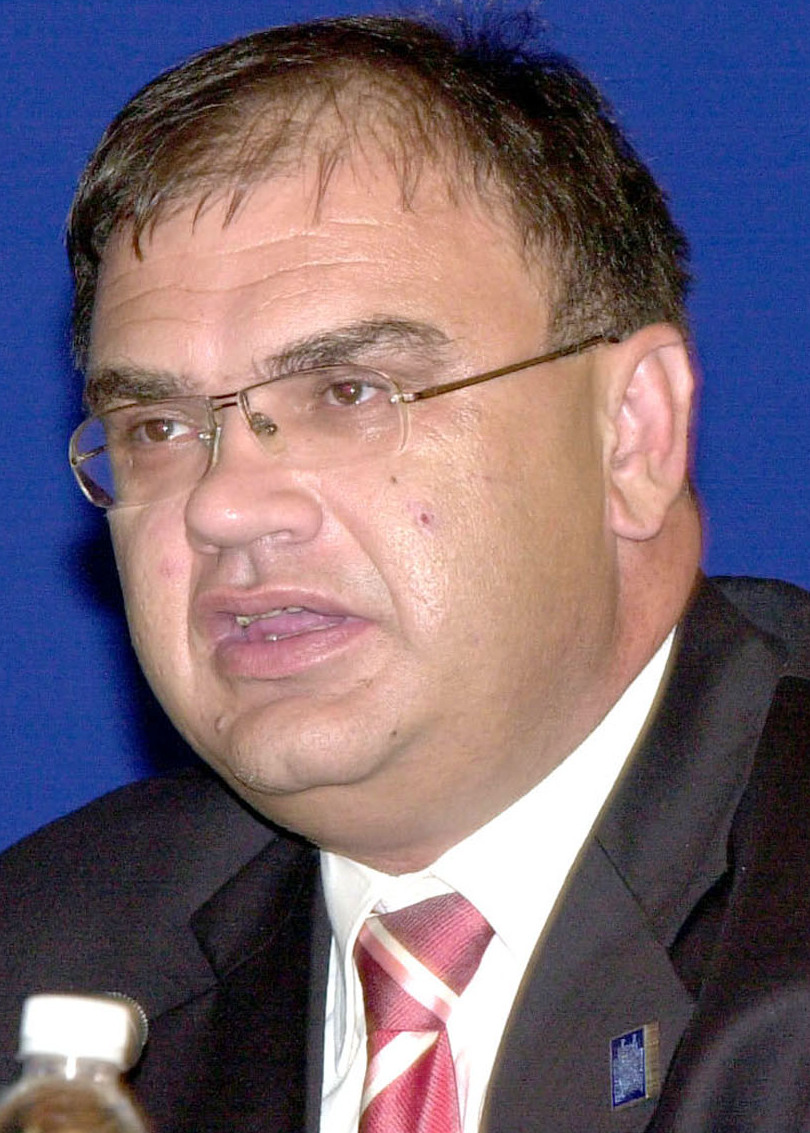
Candidate	Momčilo Krajišnik	Mladen Ivanić
Party	SDS	PDP
Popular vote	690,646	307,461
Percentage	67.30%	29.96%
Presidency members before election
Office established
Elected Presidency members
Alija Izetbegović (Bosniak)
Krešimir Zubak (Croat)
Momčilo Krajišnik (Serb)
- House of Representatives
- All 42 seats in the House of Representatives; 22 seats needed for a majority
Party	Leader	Vote %	Seats
SDA	Alija Izetbegović	37.92	19
SDS	Biljana Plavšić	24.11	9
HDZ BiH	Krešimir Zubak	14.10	8
Joint List	Nijaz Duraković	5.68	2
NSSM	Živko Radišić	5.67	2
SBiH	Haris Silajdžić	3.91	2
This lists parties that won seats. See the complete results below.
Chairman before	Chairman after
Hasan Muratović (SDA) (as Prime Minister)	Haris Silajdžić (SBiH); Boro Bosić (SDS) (as Co-Chairmen)

General elections were held in Bosnia and Herzegovina on 14 September 1996. Voter turnout was 79.40% in the parliamentary election and 80.42% in the presidential election.

The elections for the House of Representatives were divided into two; one for the Federation of Bosnia and Herzegovina and one for Republika Srpska. In the presidential election, voters in the Federation elected Bosniak Alija Izetbegović and Croat Krešimir Zubak, while voters in Republika Srpska elected Serb Momčilo Krajišnik. The Party of Democratic Action emerged as the largest party in the House of Representatives, winning 19 of the 42 seats.

Alija Izetbegović's 730,592 votes for the Bosniak seat in the Presidency, remain the highest ever total vote count for a Presidency member in a Bosnian general election. The percentage of the vote received by Krešimir Zubak for the Croat seat in the Presidency – 88.70% – is the highest of any Presidency member to date.

Irregularities were reported.

== Results ==
=== Presidency ===
Candidate	Party	Votes	%
Bosniak member
Alija Izetbegović	Party of Democratic Action	730,592	80.00
Haris Silajdžić	Party for Bosnia and Herzegovina	124,396	13.62
Fikret Abdić	Democratic People's Union	25,584	2.80
Sead Avdić	Joint List	21,254	2.33
Ibrahim Spahić	Civic Democratic Party	4,127	0.45
Hasib Salkić	Liberal Party	3,427	0.38
Mirnes Ajanović	Bosnian Party	2,424	0.27
Safet Redžepagić	Party of Economic Prosperity	1,473	0.16
Total		913,277	100.00
Croat member
Krešimir Zubak	Croatian Democratic Union	330,477	88.70
Ivo Komšić	Joint List	37,684	10.11
Anton Štitić	Civic Democratic Party	2,208	0.59
Vinko Ćuro	Liberal Party	2,197	0.59
Total		372,566	100.00
Serb member
Momčilo Krajišnik	Serb Democratic Party	690,646	67.30
Mladen Ivanić	Democratic Patriotic Bloc	307,461	29.96
Milivoj Zarić	Serb Patriotic Party	15,407	1.50
Branko Latinović	Serb Party of Krajina	12,643	1.23
Total		1,026,157	100.00
Valid votes		2,312,000	91.75
Invalid/blank votes		207,915	8.25
Total votes		2,519,915	100.00
Registered voters/turnout		3,133,634	80.42
Source: Nohlen & Stöver

=== House of Representatives ===
Party	Votes	%	Seats
Party of Democratic Action	909,970	37.92	19
Serb Democratic Party	578,723	24.11	9
Croatian Democratic Union	338,440	14.10	8
Joint List	136,203	5.68	2
People's Alliance for Free Peace	136,077	5.67	2
Party for Bosnia and Herzegovina	93,816	3.91	2
Serbian Radical Party	62,409	2.60	0
Democratic Patriotic Bloc	29,494	1.23	0
Democratic People's Union	25,562	1.07	0
Croatian Party of Rights	14,879	0.62	0
Serb Patriotic Party	14,146	0.59	0
People's Party	13,680	0.57	0
Party of Serbian Unity	8,183	0.34	0
Civic Democratic Party	7,721	0.32	0
Bosnian Party	6,523	0.27	0
Liberal Party	4,996	0.21	0
Party of Economic Prosperity	4,905	0.20	0
Vladimir Srebrov List	4,574	0.19	0
List of Women	4,149	0.17	0
Bosnian-Herzegovinian Patriotic Party	3,295	0.14	0
Liberal Bosniak Organisation	2,129	0.09	0
Total	2,399,874	100.00	42
Valid votes	2,399,874	96.46	
Invalid/blank votes	88,123	3.54	
Total votes	2,487,997	100.00	
Registered voters/turnout	3,133,634	79.40	
Source: Nohlen & Stöver, IPU, Global Elections Database

==== By entity ====
Party	Federation			Republika Srpska			Total seats
Party	Votes	%	Seats	Votes	%	Seats	Total seats
Party of Democratic Action	725,417	54.22	16	184,553	17.38	3	19
Serb Democratic Party				578,723	54.49	9	9
Croatian Democratic Union	338,440	25.30	8				8
Joint List	105,918	7.92	2	30,285	2.85	0	2
People's Alliance for Free Peace				136,077	12.81	2	2
Party for Bosnia and Herzegovina	93,816	7.01	2				2
Serbian Radical Party				62,409	5.88	0	0
Democratic Patriotic Bloc				29,494	2.78	0	0
Democratic People's Union	25,562	1.91	0				0
Croatian Party of Rights	14,879	1.11	0				0
Serb Patriotic Party				14,146	1.33	0	0
People's Party				13,680	1.29	0	0
Party of Serbian Unity				8,183	0.77	0	0
Civic Democratic Party	3,292	0.25	0	4,429	0.42	0	0
Bosnian Party	6,523	0.49	0				0
Liberal Party	4,996	0.37	0				0
Party of Economic Prosperity	4,905	0.37	0				0
Vladimir Srebrov List	4,574	0.34	0				0
List of Women	4,149	0.31	0				0
Bosnian-Herzegovinian Patriotic Party	3,295	0.25	0				0
Liberal Bosniak Organisation	2,129	0.16	0				0
Total	1,337,895	100.00	28	1,061,979	100.00	14	42
Source: Nohlen & Stöver, IPU, Global Elections Database
