= 2000 Bosnian parliamentary election =

- 11 November 2000
- All 42 seats in the House of Representatives; 22 seats needed for a majority
- Turnout: 64.40% (▼3.59 pp)
Party	Leader	Vote %	Seats	+/–
SDA	Alija Izetbegović	18.76	8	−5
SDP BiH	Zlatko Lagumdžija	18.00	9	+5
SDS	Dragan Kalinić	16.68	6	+2
HDZ BiH	Ante Jelavić	11.40	5	−1
SBiH	Haris Silajdžić	11.34	5	+2
PDP	Mladen Ivanić	6.39	2	New
SNSD–DSP	Milorad Dodik	5.09	1	0
SP	Živko Radišić	2.61	1	0
SNS	Biljana Plavšić	1.89	1	−1
NHI	Krešimir Zubak	1.58	1	0
DNZ	Fikret Abdić	1.31	1	0
BPS	Sefer Halilović	1.16	1	+1
DSP	Alojz Knezović	1.07	1	+1
This lists parties that won seats. See the complete results below.
Chairman before	Chairman after
Martin Raguž; HDZ BiH	Božidar Matić; SDP BiH

Parliamentary elections were held in Bosnia and Herzegovina on 11 November 2000. Voter turnout was 64%.

The elections for the House of Representatives were divided into two; one for the Federation of Bosnia and Herzegovina and the other for Republika Srpska. The Social Democratic Party emerged as the largest party in the House of Representatives, winning 9 of the 42 seats.

== Electoral system ==
The elections for the House of Representatives were divided into two; one for the Federation of Bosnia and Herzegovina and the other for Republika Srpska. The 42 members of the House of Representatives are elected by proportional representation in two constituencies, the Federation of Bosnia and Herzegovina and Republika Srpska. The House of Peoples (the upper house of the parliament) has 15 members equally distributed among the three ethnic groups in Bosnia and Herzegovina: 5 Bosniaks, 5 Serbs, and 5 Croats. The members are appointed by the parliaments of the constituent peoples.

== Results ==
The Social Democratic Party (SDP BiH) of Zlatko Lagumdžija emerged as the largest party, with 9 of the 42 seats in the House of Representatives, while the conservative Party of Democratic Action (SDA) finished second with 8 seats in the House of Representatives. Voter turnout was 64.0%.

Party	Votes	%	Seats
Party of Democratic Action	279,548	18.76	8
Social Democratic Party	268,270	18.00	9
Serb Democratic Party	248,579	16.68	6
Croatian Democratic Union	169,821	11.40	5
Party for Bosnia and Herzegovina	168,995	11.34	5
Party of Democratic Progress	95,245	6.39	2
Alliance of Independent Social Democrats	75,821	5.09	1
Socialist Party	38,851	2.61	1
Serb National Alliance	28,125	1.89	1
New Croatian Initiative	23,604	1.58	1
Democratic People's Alliance	20,427	1.37	0
Democratic People's Union	19,527	1.31	1
Bosnian-Herzegovinian Patriotic Party	17,248	1.16	1
Democratic Party of Pensioners	15,962	1.07	1
Liberal Democratic Party	9,160	0.61	0
Civic Democratic Party	6,118	0.41	0
Radical Party of Republika Srpska	4,920	0.33	0
Total	1,490,221	100.00	42
Valid votes	1,490,221	92.25	
Invalid/blank votes	125,212	7.75	
Total votes	1,615,433	100.00	
Registered voters/turnout	2,508,349	64.40	
Source: CEC, CEC, Nohlen & Stöver

=== By entity ===
Party	Federation			Republika Srpska		
Party	Votes	%	Seats	Votes	%	Seats
Party of Democratic Action	233,352	27.02	7	46,196	7.37	1
Social Democratic Party	235,616	27.28	8	32,654	5.21	1
Serb Democratic Party				248,579	39.67	6
Croatian Democratic Union	166,667	19.30	5	3,154	0.50	0
Party for Bosnia and Herzegovina	134,917	15.62	4	34,078	5.44	1
Party of Democratic Progress				95,245	15.20	2
SNSD–DSP	9,137	1.06	0	66,684	10.64	1
Socialist Party	3,071	0.36	0	35,780	5.71	1
Serb National Alliance				28,125	4.49	1
New Croatian Initiative	17,624	2.04	1	5,980	0.95	0
Democratic People's Alliance				20,427	3.26	0
Democratic People's Union	18,895	2.19	1	632	0.10	0
Bosnian-Herzegovinian Patriotic Party	15,857	1.84	1	1,391	0.22	0
Democratic Party of Pensioners	15,962	1.85	1			
Liberal Democratic Party	7,888	0.91	0	1,272	0.20	0
Civic Democratic Party	4,644	0.54	0	1,474	0.24	0
Radical Party of Republika Srpska				4,920	0.79	0
Total	863,630	100.00	28	626,591	100.00	14
Source: CEC, CEC
