= League of Socialist Youth of Bosnia and Herzegovina =

Youth organization in the Socialist Republic of Bosnia and Herzegovina

The League of Socialist Youth of Bosnia and Herzegovina (Serbo-Croatian: Savez socijalističke omladine Bosne i Hercegovine, abbreviated SSOBiH or SSO BiH) was a youth organization in the Socialist Republic of Bosnia and Herzegovina. SSOBiH traced its roots to the youth resistance movements during World War II, and became the main youth organization in the republic during the Tito era. During the 1980s, SSOBiH became increasingly autonomous from the party line and eventually became a political party of its own. It was succeeded by the Liberal Democratic Party.

== Anti-fascist youth movement in Bosnia and Herzegovina during World War II ==
In the midst the partisan resistance struggle, in December 1941 the Young Communist League of Yugoslavia (SKOJ) took the initiative to start building the Popular Liberation Youth League of Bosnia and Herzegovina (Narodnooslobodilačkog saveza omladine Bosne i Hercegovine, abbreviated NOSOBiH), as a mass organization to seeking to unite Muslim, Croat and Serb youth to fight the Axis occupation. NOSOBiH was founded in early 1942, and towards the end of 1942 NOSOBiH became integrated into the United Antifascist Youth League of Yugoslavia (USAOJ). On September 20, 1943 a USAO BiH Regional Conference for the Bosnian Krajina was held at which the USAO BiH Regional Board was elected. The 1st congress of the United Antifascist Youth League of Bosnia and Herzegovina (Ujedinjenog saveza antifašističke omladine Bosne i Hercegovine, abbreviated USAOBiH) was held in Sarajevo May 5–9, 1945. USAOBiH published Riječ as its organ.

== People's Youth of Bosnia and Herzegovina ==
After the war, USAOBiH transformed into the People's Youth of Bosnia and Herzegovina (Narodne omladine Bosne i Hercegovine, abbreviated NOBiH). The second congress of NOBiH was held in Sarajevo June 14–17, 1947, with 470 delegates in attendance. The third NOBiH congress was held in 1949, the fourth congress in 1954, the fifth congress in 1957 and the sixth congress in 1962.

== Youth League of Bosnia and Herzegovina ==
NOBiH then transformed into the Youth League of Bosnia and Herzegovina (Savez omladine Bosne i Hercegovine, abbreviated SOBiH). A single congress, the seventh of the organization, was held during this period in 1968. SOBiH was the republican branch of the Youth League of Yugoslavia (SOJ). Branko Ekert was elected SOBiH chairman at the 20th plenum of the SOBiH Central Committee, held in October 1967. Arif Smajić was the secretary of the SOBiH Central Committee. The other members of the SOBiH Secretariat were Miomira Gerun, Rada Stanar, Mehmedalija Sarajlić, Mustafa Dulizarević and Ivo Cvitković.

== Eight to Tenth congresses ==
SOBiH then became the League of Socialist Youth of Bosnia and Herzegovina (SSOBiH). SSOBiH was the republican-level organization of the League of Socialist Youth of Yugoslavia (SSOJ). SSOBiH was one of the constituent organizations of the Socialist League of Working People of Bosnia and Herzegovina (SSRNBiH).

SSOBiH held its eight congress in 1974, its ninth congress in 1978 and its tenth congress in 1982. The importance of youth volunteering was highlighted at the 1974 eight SSOBiH congress.

== Dissidence in the 1980s ==
SSOBiH held its eleventh congress in 1986. As of 1988 SSOBiH, along with other republican-level branches of SSOJ, became increasingly independent from the Yugoslav mother organization.

In 1989 Rasim Kadić became the president of SSOBiH. SSOBiH, under the leadership of Kadić, accompanied by Martin Raguž and Đorđe Latinović, became a hub of opposition to the party leadership. For example, in 1988 SSOBiH vetoed candidacy of Mato Andrić for the presidency of the republic, which led Andrić to withdraw his candidacy. The SSOBiH publication Naši dani would print criticisms of the government, moves that contributed to making it the foremost political newspaper in Bosnia and Herzegovina, with a fortnightly circulation of up to 100,000 issues. Valter, another SSOBiH publication, was a widely read magazine at the time. SSOBiH also had a popular program on Radio Sarajevo. SSOBiH and the Association for the Yugoslav Democratic Initiative (UJDI) formed the Democratic Forum, which called for integrative non-ethnic citizenship for Bosnia-Herzegovina.

In September 1989 SSOBiH openly criticized the role of the party leadership, using the label 'the Bosnian silence' (a term that instantly became controversial). The October 1980 Political Manifesto of SSOBiH called multiparty system, market economy and abolition of death penalty. However, the reformist line of Kadić was not universally supported within SSOBiH ranks. Opposition to the Sarajevo-based SSOBiH leadership was mobilized in Banja Luka, Bosnian Krajina and east Bosnia organizations of SSOBiH. Igor Radojičić emerged as the leader of the Serb-dominated opposition within SSOBiH.

At the time of the 10th congress of the League of Communists of Bosnia and Herzegovina (SKBiH), held in December 1989, SSOBiH and Kadić voiced support for the 'ZAVNOBiH Initiative', which called for multiparty pluralism.

== As a political party ==
Kadić renounced his party membership a week following the January 1990 14th Congress of the League of Communists of Yugoslavia. SSOBiH continued to function under Kadić's leadership, but separately from the SKBiH. The influence of SSOBiH was concentrated in main cities. SSOBiH called to postpone 1990 elections, advocating to await improved conditions for multiparty elections.

SSOBiH held its 12th congress April 19–20, 1990, with 367 delegates participating. The group around Kadić presented a document that called for a federal Yugoslavia, removing the word 'socialist' from the name of the republic, multiparty system, market economy and de-politicization of all state institutions. The document failed to win a majority of votes at the congress, obtaining 158 votes. Likewise the congress rejected breaking the links between SSOBiH and SSOJ. The name of the organization was changed to League of Socialist Youth – Democratic Alliance (Savez socijalističke omladine – Demokratski savez, abbreviated SSO-DS), a compromise solution as the proposed name 'Social Democratic Alliance' had been rejected by the congress majority.

On May 25, 1990 SKBiH mobilized a mass rally for Youth Day, calling for a united Bosnia and Herzegovina. SSO-DS boycotted the rally, in sharp contrast to Youth Day celebrations earlier years.

SSO-DS suffered a split, as there were discontents with Kadic's role. Ognjen Janković split away from SSO-DS, who actually separated from Kadić's party. In particular he was upset with Kadić participation at the founding congress of the Party of Democratic Action (SDA). Janković's group took the name 'League of Socialist Youth-Centre Democratic Alliance', which got registered as a political party July 23, 1990 with Janković as its chairman.

For the November 1990 election SSO-DS launched the slogan "Our hands are clean". The organization produced a wide array of promotional products for its campaign – pens, badges, balloons, raincoats, paper bags and condoms. At the time SSO-DS still benefitted from state budget funding. SSO-DS had four candidates for the multi-member Presidency of Bosnia-Herzegovina; Nazif Gljiva (Bosniak 133,263 votes), Martin Raguž (Croat, 130,198 votes), Azemina Vuković (Other, 61,373 votes) and Đorđe Latinović (Serb, 222,728 votes). The average age of presidential candidates of SSO-DS was 35 years.

SSO-DS had candidates in all constituencies for the Council of Citizens. The party contested in alliance with the Ecological Movement "Greens" (EKO). SSO-DS obtained 30,505 votes (1.36%) The alliance elected two members of parliament, with SSO-DS and EKO winning one seat each – Kadić from Sarajevo and Dragica Stojanović from Tuzla. Notably, Dražen Petrović, the number two candidate on the SSO-DS list in the Sarajevo constituency, had registered his ethnicity as 'Eskimo' – presumably as a protest of the requirement to register ethnic identity of political candidates.

In the election to the Council of Municipalities, SSO-DS had candidates in 14 municipalities In the Tuzla District, SSO-DS contested on a joint list with SK-SDP and DSS in the elections to the Council of Citizens and Council of Municipalities.

In local body elections, SSO-DS won 70 seats.

In mid-1991 SSO-DS changed name to the Liberal Party of Bosnia and Herzegovina (Liberalna stranka Bosne i Hercegovine, abbreviated LSBiH). By late 1991 LSBiH had switched to a pro-independence position. In May 2000 LSBiH merged with the Liberal Bosniak Organization (LBO) to form the Liberal Democratic Party (LDS).
