= Ivo Komšić =

Bosnian professor and politician (born 1948)

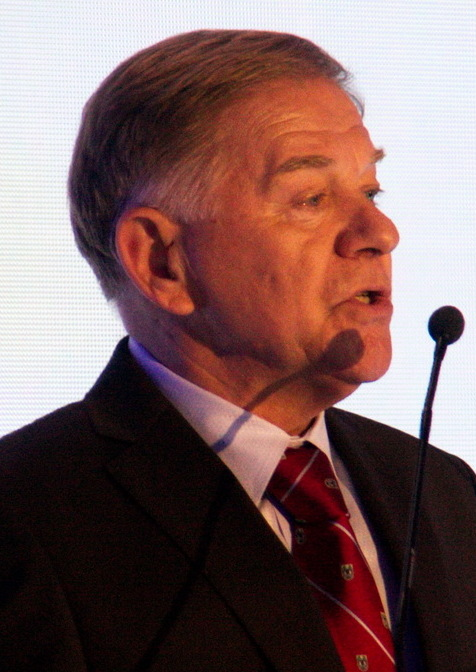
- Komšić in 2015

37th Mayor of Sarajevo
- In office 27 March 2013 – 6 February 2017
- Preceded by: Alija Behmen
- Succeeded by: Abdulah Skaka

Croat member of the Presidency of the Republic of Bosnia and Herzegovina
- In office 24 October 1993 – 5 October 1996; Serving with Stjepan Kljuić
- Preceded by: Franjo Boras
- Succeeded by: Krešimir Zubak
Parliamentary offices
Member of the Federal House of Representatives
In office
6 November 2006 – 10 November 2010
Additional positions
President of the Croatian Peasant Party of Bosnia and Herzegovina
In office 12 April 1993 – October 1995
Preceded by	Office established

Personal details
- Born: 16 June 1948 (age 78) Kiseljak, PR Bosnia and Herzegovina, FPR Yugoslavia
- Party: SKJ (until 1991); HSS BiH (1993–1996); SDP BiH (1996–2002); SDU BiH (2002–2013); USD (2013–2014); SDP BiH (2014–2019)
- Children: 3
- Education: University of Sarajevo (BA, MA, PhD)

Ivo Komšić (born 16 June 1948) is a Bosnian professor and politician who served as the 37th mayor of Sarajevo from 2013 to 2017. He was a key figure in the talks that led to the end of the Bosnian War with the Dayton Agreement, and the formation of the Federation of Bosnia and Herzegovina.

Komšić served as the Croat member of the Presidency of the Republic of Bosnia and Herzegovina alongside Stjepan Kljuić from 1993 to 1996, most of it during the war. He also served as member of the Federal House of Representatives from 2006 to 2010.

== Early life ==
Komšić was born into a Bosnian Croat family in the village Borina by Kiseljak, Bosnia and Herzegovina. When he was born, in 1948, the country was part of Yugoslavia.

== Bosnian War ==
At the beginning of the war in 1992, Komšić served temporarily as the Ministry of Defense as a volunteer and joined a humanitarian organization in Kiseljak.

Komšić joined the Party of Democratic Reform political party in March 1991, leaving it after co-founding the Croatian Peasant Party of Bosnia and Herzegovina on 12 April 1993 with a group of Croat intellectuals, shortly before the escalation of war in Central Bosnia. This party created an alternative Croat policy in Bosnia and Herzegovina, opting for preservation of unified Republic of Bosnia and Herzegovina and coexistence of Croats with other nations in the whole of Bosnia and Herzegovina. In November 1993 he became a member of Republic of Bosnia and Herzegovina Presidency based on the result of 1990 elections.

He was a key figure in the formation of the Federation during the Bosnian War and the talks that led to the end of the Bosnian war with the Dayton Accords.

Komšić has claimed that the nationalist Croatian Democratic Union of Bosnia and Herzegovina (HDZ BiH), the largest political party of Bosnian Croats derived from the Croatian Democratic Union (HDZ), founded by Croatian leader Franjo Tuđman, made its way into Bosnia-Herzegovina in 1990 through the parish system of the Catholic Church in Bosnia-Herzegovina. Komšić contends that the Bosnian Catholic bishops and clergy made it possible for the HDZ to obtain electoral victory in Bosnia-Herzegovina, even though it was clear that the party's goal was the dismemberment of the republic, and its integration into neighboring Croatia.

== Political career ==
Komšić led his political party the Croatian Peasants' Party for two years until October 1995, leaving the party the following year when he finished in second place in the 1996 election. He joined the Social Democratic Party following the loss. After another lost election in 2002, Komšić joined the Social Democratic Union.

He was the chairman of the Federal House of Peoples between 2000 and 2002. Between 2006 and 2010 he was a representative in the Federal House of Representatives. In 2010, he was named dean of the Faculty of Philosophy of the University of Sarajevo.

Komšić has squabbled with Bosnian Serb nationalist politician Milorad Dodik on several occasions. When Dodik said that no politicians from the Republika Srpska (RS) entity of Bosnia and Herzegovina would participate in the then-upcoming centennial commemorations of the assassination of Archduke Franz Ferdinand of Austria by Serb Gavrilo Princip, and that the commemorations were only going to be used as a ploy to incite hate against Serbs, Komšić responded by saying that Dodik has no say in what goes on in Sarajevo, and that he hoped that soon, Dodik wouldn't have any say in what goes on in RS either. The French Embassy in Sarajevo dismissed the remarks made by Dodik about the planned events, saying the commemorations were meant to send a message of peace.

Dodik is believed to have been behind the September 2014 installation of a giant unauthorized cross on the hill Zlatište on Mount Trebević overlooking Sarajevo. Komšić accused him of installing the cross to improve his dropping political rating amongst Serbs in Republika Srpska before the upcoming election. Komšić verbally condemned the installation of the cross. He urged Sarajevans to not respond to the "clear provocation that is part of the election campaign."

== Mayor of Sarajevo (2013–2017) ==
Komšić joined the 2013 JMBG protests in Sarajevo, saying “I am here also on behalf of over 1,500 Sarajevo babies who can’t get travel documents.”

During the protests and riots throughout Bosnia and Herzegovina in February 2014, Komšić said that demolition of government buildings was not the answer. He stated that while he was aware that people had been brought to the social edge, he urged the public to clearly state their demands in a peaceful manner.

When Pope Francis visited Bosnia and Herzegovina on 6 June 2015, Komšić awarded him the Keys to the City of Sarajevo award.

Following the trial and guilty verdict of Serb war criminal Radovan Karadžić on 24 March 2016, Komšić stated that while it is important that the judgement confirmed Karadžić's direct responsibility for years of terror on Bosnia and Herzegovina, he is not satisfied with the 40-year sentence, saying Karadžić should have received the maximum due to the severity of the crimes. He wondered why the Tribunal decided to limit the genocide charge to Srebrenica only, as "Karadžić was responsible for atrocities across the country." He added, "If we take only Sarajevo into account, it would be more than enough for life imprisonment."

Komšić has stressed his desire for his country to move past the violent events of the 20th century and "into the new era".

Political offices
Preceded by Alija Behmen	Mayor of Sarajevo; 2013–2017	Succeeded by Abdulah Skaka
