= Social Democratic Party of Bosnia and Herzegovina =

Social Democratic Party of Bosnia and Herzegovina Socijaldemokratska partija Bosne i Hercegovine Социјалдемократска партија Боснe и Херцеговинe
- Abbreviation: SDP BiH
- President: Nermin Nikšić
- General Secretary: Edis Dervišagić
- Deputy Presidents: See list: Adnan Šteta Zukan Helez Vojin Mijatović
- Founder: Nijaz Duraković
- Founded: 27 December 1992; 33 years ago
- Preceded by: League of Communists of Bosnia and Herzegovina
- Headquarters: Alipašina 41, Sarajevo
- Youth wing: Youth Forum SDP BiH
- Membership: c. 50,000
- Ideology: Social democracy; Pro-Europeanism
- Political position: Centre-left to left-wing
- National affiliation: Troika (since 2020)
- European affiliation: Party of European Socialists (associate)
- International affiliation: Socialist International; Progressive Alliance
- Colours: Red
- HoP BiH: 0 / 15
- HoR BiH: 5 / 42
- HoP FBiH: 11 / 80
- HoR FBiH: 16 / 98
- NA RS: 1 / 83
- Cantonal Heads: 0 / 10
- Mayors: 9 / 145

Website
- sdp.ba

The Social Democratic Party of Bosnia and Herzegovina (Bosnian: Socijaldemokratska partija Bosne i Hercegovine abbr. SDP BiH) is a social democratic political party in Bosnia and Herzegovina. It is considered the successor of the League of Communists of Bosnia and Herzegovina, the Bosnian branch of the former League of Communists of Yugoslavia. Initially established as a multi-ethnic party, the SDP BiH has since the early 2000s experienced a decline in support among Croats and Serbs, and its voter base has become predominantly Bosniak.

In the period after the Bosnian War, the SDP BiH emerged as the leading non-nationalist party in Bosnia and Herzegovina. The party achieved significant success in the 2000 parliamentary election, forming a ruling coalition led by SDP member Božidar Matić. However, in the 2002 election, the party suffered major losses and was pushed into the opposition. The SDP BiH returned to power following the 2010 general election, but once again lost influence in the 2014 election, following the 2014 demonstrations. The party entered the government of the Sarajevo Canton after the 2018 election, and in 2020 formed the Troika alliance. Following the 2022 general election, the SDP BiH became part of the ruling coalition at the national level as well.

The SDP BiH remains the main center-left party in the country and continues to advocate for a unified, multi-ethnic Bosnia and Herzegovina based on social justice and European integration. It is a member of the Party of European Socialists, Progressive Alliance, and the Socialist International.

== History ==
=== Origin ===
Former party logo

The SDP BiH has its roots in the Social Democratic Party of Bosnia and Herzegovina, founded in 1909 during the Austro-Hungarian rule. The party was founded by workers to defend and represent their rights and interests, and consisted of members of all ethnic groups. On 20 April 1920, the Social Democratic Party became part of the League of Communists of Yugoslavia.

The SDP BiH was reestablished on 27 December 1992. The party was enlarged by the inclusion of the Social Democrats of Bosnia and Herzegovina.

=== Timeline ===
In the first post-war election in 1996, under Nijaz Duraković, the SDP BiH participated as part of the Joint List coalition. However, its candidates for the Presidency, Sead Avdić and Ivo Komšić, were not elected, and the party remained in opposition.

On 6 April 1997, Zlatko Lagumdžija was elected as the SDP BiH's new president. A major breakthrough came in the 2000 parliamentary election, when the party won the most seats in the House of Representatives. This enabled the SDP BiH to enter government and lead a coalition. On 22 February 2001, Božidar Matić was appointed Chairman of the Council of Ministers, marking the SDP BiH’s first major role in state-level governance.

After losing power in the 2002 general election, the party returned to opposition, where it remained until the 2010 general election. In that election, the SDP BiH again became a key governing party and participated in forming governments at different levels. During this period, Željko Komšić, elected as the Croat member of the Presidency in 2006 and re-elected in 2010, was one of its most prominent figures. However, internal disagreements weakened the party, and Komšić left in 2013 to found the Democratic Front.

Following the 2014 general election, the SDP BiH lost power and entered a period in opposition. On 7 December 2014, Nermin Nikšić was elected party president.

Ahead of the 2020 municipal elections, the SDP BiH formed a broader opposition alliance known as the “Four,” together with People and Justice (NiP), Our Party (NS), and the Independent Bosnian-Herzegovinian List (NBL). The NBL left the coalition, so the parties left renamed themselves the Troika.

In the 2022 general election, the coalition supported Denis Bećirović as its candidate for the Bosniak member of the Presidency. He went on to win the election with 57.37% of the vote. Following this success, the SDP BiH returned to power by participating in the formation of a new government together with several parties, including the Alliance of Independent Social Democrats and the Croatian Democratic Union.

== Ideology ==
The Social Democratic Party is centre-left to left-wing on the political scale. The program vision corresponds to values and ideas of social democracy in Europe and the world. The SDP BiH is additionally anti-nationalist and multi-ethnic.

== Leadership ==
#	Name (Born–Died)	Portrait	Term of Office		Days
1	Nijaz Duraković (1949–2012)		27 December 1992	6 April 1997	4 years, 100 days
2	Zlatko Lagumdžija (b. 1955)		6 April 1997	7 December 2014	17 years, 245 days
3	Nermin Nikšić (b. 1960)		7 December 2014	present	11 years, 323 days

== Election results ==
=== Parliamentary Assembly of Bosnia and Herzegovina ===
Parliamentary Assembly of Bosnia and Herzegovina
Year	Leader	#	Popular vote	%	HoR	Seat change	HoP	Seat change	Government
1996 (Note: Run as part of the Joint List.)	Nijaz Duraković	4th	136,203	5.68	2 / 42	New	0 / 15	New	Opposition
1998	Zlatko Lagumdžija	5th	159,876	9.26	4 / 42	▲2	1 / 15	▲1	Opposition
2000	Zlatko Lagumdžija	1st	268,270	18.00	9 / 42	▲5	3 / 15	▲2	Coalition
2002	Zlatko Lagumdžija	4th	128,212	10.43	4 / 42	▼5	1 / 15	▼2	Opposition
2006	Zlatko Lagumdžija	4th	143,272	10.15	5 / 42	▲1	1 / 15	0	Opposition
2010	Zlatko Lagumdžija	1st	284,435	17.33	8 / 42	▲3	4 / 15	▲3	Coalition
2014	Zlatko Lagumdžija	7th	108,501	6.65	3 / 42	▼5	0 / 15	▼4	Opposition
2018	Nermin Nikšić	4th	150,453	9.08	5 / 42	▲2	1 / 15	▲1	Opposition
2022	Nermin Nikšić	4th	129,499	8.15	5 / 42	0	0 / 15	▼1	Coalition
2026	Nermin Nikšić	3rd	122,764	9.07	5 / 42	0	TBD	TBD	TBD

=== Parliament of the Federation of Bosnia and Herzegovina ===
Parliament of the Federation of Bosnia and Herzegovina
Year	Leader	#	Popular vote	%	HoR	Seat change	HoP	Seat change	Government
1996	Nijaz Duraković	3rd	105,897	7.93	11 / 140	New	4 / 65	New	Opposition
1998	Zlatko Lagumdžija	3rd	126,635	13.65	19 / 140	▲8	10 / 72	▲6	Opposition
2000	Zlatko Lagumdžija	2nd	226,440	26.09	37 / 140	▲18	37 / 81	▲27	Coalition
2002	Zlatko Lagumdžija	3rd	111,668	15.96	15 / 98	▼22	9 / 58	▼28	Opposition
2006	Zlatko Lagumdžija	3rd	130,204	15.17	17 / 98	▲2	12 / 58	▲3	Opposition
2010	Zlatko Lagumdžija	1st	251,053	24.53	28 / 98	▲11	21 / 58	▲9	Coalition
2014	Zlatko Lagumdžija	5th	100,626	10.14	12 / 98	▼16	10 / 58	▼11	Opposition
2018	Nermin Nikšić	2nd	145,458	14.53	16 / 98	▲4	12 / 58	▲2	Opposition
2022	Nermin Nikšić	2nd	131,323	13.46	15 / 98	▼1	15 / 80	▲3	Coalition
2026	Nermin Nikšić	2nd	121,009	15.12	16 / 98	▲1	TBD	TBD	TBD

=== Presidency elections ===
Presidency of Bosnia and Herzegovina
Election year	#	Candidate	Votes	%	Representing	Note	Elected?
1996	2nd	Ivo Komšić (Note: Member of the HSS.)	37,684	10.1%	Croats	Support	No
1996	4th	Sead Avdić	21,254	2.3%	Bosniaks	—	No
1998	2nd	Gradimir Gojer	113,961	31.8%	Croats	—	No
2002	3rd	Alija Behmen	90,434	17.5%	Bosniaks	—	No
2002	7th	Mladen Grahovac	22,852	4.5%	Serbs	—	No
2006	1st	Željko Komšić	116,062	40.0%	Croats	—	Yes
2006	4th	Jugoslav Jovičić	22,245	4.1%	Serbs	—	No
2010	1st	Željko Komšić	337,065	60.6%	Croats	—	Yes
2014	4th	Bakir Hadžiomerović	75,369	10.0%	Bosniaks	—	No
2018	2nd	Denis Bećirović	194,688	33.5%	Bosniaks	—	No
2022	1st	Denis Bećirović	330,238	57.3%	Bosniaks	—	Yes
2022	3rd	Vojin Mijatović	38,655	6.1%	Serbs	—	No
2026	1st	Denis Bećirović	222,484	38.1%	Bosniaks	—	Yes

=== Cantonal elections ===
Cantonal election	Cantonal Assembly										
Cantonal election	Una-Sana	Posavina	Tuzla	Zenica-Doboj	Bosnian Podrinje Goražde	Central Bosnia	Herzegovina-Neretva	West Herzegovina	Sarajevo	Canton 10	Total won / Total contested
1996	1 / 50	0 / 20	9 / 50	4 / 59	1 / 31	2 / 55	1 / 50	0 / 31	8 / 45	0 / 15	26 / 406
1998	3 / 50	1 / 30	10 / 50	11 / 50	5 / 31	5 / 50	3 / 50	0 / 31	11 / 45	1 / 30	50 / 417
2000	6 / 30	4 / 19	16 / 35	11 / 35	8 / 25	6 / 28	4 / 28	0 / 21	14 / 35	1 / 23	70 / 279
2002	4 / 30	3 / 21	11 / 35	6 / 35	5 / 25	3 / 30	3 / 30	0 / 23	10 / 35	1 / 25	46 / 289
2006	6 / 30	2 / 21	11 / 35	5 / 35	6 / 25	3 / 30	2 / 30	0 / 23	7 / 35	1 / 25	43 / 289
2010	8 / 30	1 / 21	13 / 35	10 / 35	7 / 25	6 / 30	5 / 30	0 / 23	10 / 35	1 / 25	61 / 289
2014	4 / 30	1 / 21	6 / 35	4 / 35	2 / 25	4 / 30	3 / 30	0 / 23	4 / 35	1 / 25	29 / 289
2018	4 / 30	1 / 21	10 / 35	6 / 35	2 / 25	5 / 30	3 / 30	0 / 23	4 / 35	1 / 25	36 / 289
2022	3 / 30	1 / 21	8 / 35	5 / 35	2 / 25	4 / 30	3 / 30	0 / 23	6 / 35	2 / 25	34 / 289
2026	4 / 30	1 / 21	7 / 35	5 / 35	2 / 25	6 / 30	3 / 30	0 / 23	9 / 35	1 / 25	38 / 289
