= List of presidents of the Federation of Bosnia and Herzegovina =

This article lists the presidents of the Federation of Bosnia and Herzegovina.

== List of officeholders ==
Croatian Democratic Union Party of Democratic Action Social Democratic Party Party for Bosnia and Herzegovina Croatian Party of Rights Party of Justice and Trust

No.	Portrait	Name (Birth–Death)	Ethnicity	Term of office			Party
No.	Portrait	Name (Birth–Death)	Ethnicity	Took office	Left office	Time in office	Party
1		Krešimir Zubak (born 1947)	Croat	31 May 1994	18 March 1997	2 years, 291 days	HDZ BiH
2		Vladimir Šoljić (born 1943)	Croat	18 March 1997	29 December 1997	286 days	HDZ BiH
3		Ejup Ganić (born 1946)	Bosniak	29 December 1997	1 January 1999	1 year, 3 days	SDA
4		Ivo Andrić-Lužanski (born 1956)	Croat	1 January 1999	1 January 2000	1 year	HDZ BiH
(3)		Ejup Ganić (born 1946)	Bosniak	1 January 2000	1 January 2001	1 year	SDA (until May 2000)
(3)		Ejup Ganić (born 1946)	Bosniak	1 January 2000	1 January 2001	1 year	Independent (from May 2000)
(4)		Ivo Andrić-Lužanski (born 1956)	Croat	1 January 2001	28 February 2001	58 days	HDZ BiH
5		Karlo Filipović (born 1954)	Croat	28 February 2001	1 January 2002	307 days	SDP BiH
6		Safet Halilović (1951–2017)	Bosniak	1 January 2002	27 January 2003	1 year, 26 days	SBiH
7		Niko Lozančić (born 1957)	Croat	27 January 2003	22 February 2007	4 years, 26 days	HDZ BiH
8		Borjana Krišto (born 1961)	Croat	22 February 2007	17 March 2011	4 years, 23 days	HDZ BiH
9		Živko Budimir (born 1962)	Croat	17 March 2011	9 February 2015	3 years, 329 days	HSP BiH (until March 2013)
9		Živko Budimir (born 1962)	Croat	17 March 2011	9 February 2015	3 years, 329 days	SPP (from April 2013)
10		Marinko Čavara (born 1967)	Croat	9 February 2015	28 February 2023	8 years, 19 days	HDZ BiH
11		Lidija Bradara (born 1971)	Croat	28 February 2023	Incumbent	3 years, 151 days	HDZ BiH

== See also ==
- List of prime ministers of the Federation of Bosnia and Herzegovina
- Vice-President of the Federation of Bosnia and Herzegovina
