= Army of the Federation of Bosnia and Herzegovina =

- Vojska Federacije Bosne i Hercegovine
- Seal of the Army of the Federation of Bosnia and Herzegovina
- Founded: 1997
- Disbanded: 2006
- Country: Bosnia and Herzegovina
- Allegiance: Federation of Bosnia and Herzegovina
- Garrison/HQ: Sarajevo, Bosnia and Herzegovina
- Engagements: Bosnian War

Commanders
- Commander: Krešimir Zubak (1994–1997); Vladimir Šoljić (1997–1997); Ejup Ganić (1997–1999); Ivo Andrić-Lužanski (1999–2000); Ejup Ganić (2000–2001); Ivo Andrić-Lužanski (2001–2001); Karlo Filipović (2001–2002); Safet Halilović (2002–2003); Niko Lozančić (2003–2005)

The Army of the Federation of Bosnia and Herzegovina (Bosnian, Serbian, Croatian: Vojska Federacije Bosne i Hercegovine or VFBiH) was the military of the Federation of Bosnia and Herzegovina created after the 1995 Dayton Agreement. It consisted of two merging units which had been in conflict with each other during the Croat-Bosniak War: the Bosniak Army of the Republic of Bosnia and Herzegovina (ARBiH) and the Croat Croatian Defence Council (HVO). In 2005 it was integrated into Armed Forces of Bosnia and Herzegovina controlled by the Ministry of Defense of Bosnia and Herzegovina.

== Equipment ==
Infantry Rifle

Rifle	Type	Versions	Notes
M-16A1/A2	Assault rifle	A1 and A2	Donated by USA
AR-15	Rifle	AR-15	Purchased by Federation of BiH 1998
Zastava M70	Assault rifle	AB2	
AK-47	Assault rifle	S variant	
HK 33	Assault rifle	A3	Donated by Turkey in 1997

Main Battle Tank

Main Battle Tank	Type	Versions	In service	Notes
M60 PattonA3	Main battle tank	A3/A3TTS	45	
AMX-30B2	Main battle tank	B2S, hybrid between S and B2	36	From UAE
T-55	Main battle tank	T-55	10	From Egypt

Aircraft

Aircraft	Type	Versions	In service	Notes
UH-1H	Utility helicopter	UH-1H	15	
Lola Utva 75	Liaison		11	
Mil Mi-8	Utility helicopter		22	

== See also ==
- Army of the Republic of Bosnia and Herzegovina
- Croatian Defence Council
- Army of Republika Srpska
- War in Bosnia and Herzegovina
