= Živko Budimir =

Bosnian Croat politician

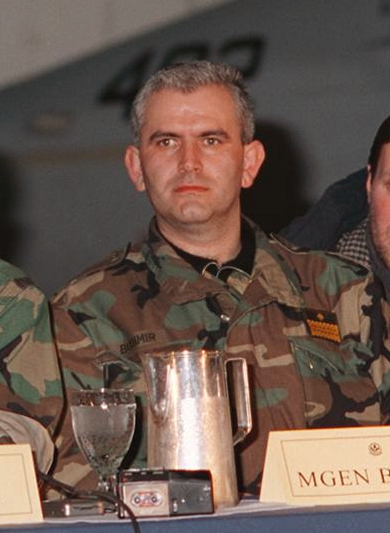
- Budimir in 1996

9th President of the Federation of Bosnia and Herzegovina
- In office 17 March 2011 – 9 February 2015
- Prime Minister: Nermin Nikšić
- Vice President: Mirsad Kebo; Svetozar Pudarić
- Preceded by: Borjana Krišto
- Succeeded by: Marinko Čavara

Personal details
- Born: 20 November 1962 (age 63) Posušje, PR Bosnia and Herzegovina, FPR Yugoslavia
- Party: SKJ (1979–1984); Croatian Party of Rights (2006–2013) Party of Justice and Trust (2013–2021)
- Spouse: Darija Kuna
- Children: 3
- Education: War College "Ban Josip Jelačić"
- Awards: Order of Nikola Šubić Zrinski

Military service
- Allegiance: Yugoslavia (1984–1986); Croatia (1991–2001); Herzeg-Bosnia (1993–1994); Federation of Bosnia and Herzegovina (1994–2001)
- Years of service: 1984–1986; 1991–2001
- Rank: (Federation of Bosnia and Herzegovina) Colonel General (Croatia) Major General
- Unit: (Croatia) 107th Wolves Brigade (Croatia) 5th Falcons Brigade (Croatian Republic of Herzeg-Bosnia) ZP Tomislavgrad
- Commands: (Croatian Republic of Herzeg-Bosnia) ZP Prozor (Federation of Bosnia and Herzegovina) General Staff of VFBiH (Federation of Bosnia and Herzegovina) General Staff of HVO (Federation of Bosnia and Herzegovina) General Staff of Joint Command of VFBiH
- Battles/wars: Croatian War of Independence • Operation Storm; Bosnian War

Živko Budimir (Croatian pronunciation: [ʒîːʋko bûdimiːr]; born 20 November 1962) is a Bosnian Croat politician who served as the 9th President of the Federation of Bosnia and Herzegovina, one of the two autonomous entities that compose Bosnia and Herzegovina, from 17 March 2011 until 9 February 2015. He is the founder and current president of the Party of Justice and Trust.

Budimir became the President of the Federation after a political crisis following the 2010 general election. Political parties were unable to form a government. In March 2011, the Social Democratic Party, Party of Democratic Action, Croatian Party of Rights and People's Party Work for Prosperity formed a coalition named the Platform (Platforma) in which Budimir was elected President of the Federation.

He was previously Colonel General in the Army of the Federation of Bosnia and Herzegovina (VFBiH) and Major General in the Croatian Army (HV).

== Early life ==
Budimir was born in Vir near Posušje in Herzegovina. He attended the Aeronautical-Technical Military College in Rajlovac near Sarajevo from where he graduated in 1981. After that, he attended the War College of Armed Forces of Republic of Croatia "Ban Josip Jelačić", and graduated in 2000.

He became a member of the League of Communists of Yugoslavia in 1979 and left the party in 1984 as a member of the Yugoslav People's Army (JNA). He left the JNA in 1986 due to disagreement with their policy.

== Army career ==
After the Croatian War of Independence started, Budimir joined the Croatian Army in Slavonia. At first, he was member of the Civil Protection, and later he was enlisted to the 5th Brigade of HV where he served in the logistics. In 1992, his unit arrived in Orašje where Budimir became Deputy Commander of the battalion responsible for propaganda. In 1993, he became a member of the Croatian Defence Council (HVO). At first he was advisor for logistics, when he met Slobodan Praljak. Soon afterwards, Budimir was transferred to the remote control centre of Tomislavgrad military district. In December 1993, he replaced Praljak as commander of the remote control centre of Prozor military district. After that, Budimir held various posts: he was Commander of General Staff of the Military of the Federation of Bosnia and Herzegovina from April 1994 until July 1995, then Commander of the General Staff of the Croatian Defence Council from November 1995 until September 1997, and then Deputy Commander and afterwards Commander of the General Staff of the Joint Command of the Military of the Federation of Bosnia and Herzegovina from September 1997 until January 1999. In 1997, he moved to Mostar, and retired in 2001 as Colonel General of the Federal Army and a Major General of the Croatian Army. After his retirement, Budimir was involved in sports and participated in restoration of the handball club "Mostar".

== President of the Federation of Bosnia and Herzegovina ==
=== 2011 ===
Budimir's political career started again in 2006, when he became a member of the Croatian Party of Rights. In 2008, he was elected as a member of the City Council of Mostar.

After the 2010 general election, political parties were unable to form a new government, leading the Federation of Bosnia and Herzegovina into a political crisis. The Social Democratic Party (SDP), Party of Democratic Action (SDA), Croatian Party of Rights (HSP BiH) and People's Party Work for Prosperity (NSRzB) formed a new coalition named the Platform (Platforma). By a majority votes in both houses of the Federal Parliament, Budimir was elected President of the Federation of Bosnia and Herzegovina on 17 March 2011.

As President of the Federation, he proposed a change of the Rules of Procedure of the Federal Government so that no decision can't pass without agreement of one-third of Croat ministers in the government.

=== Conflict with Zukan Helez ===
In February 2012, Budimir entered into a conflict with Federal Minister for Veterans and Disabled Veterans, Zukan Helez, because of the Audit Act of Veterans' Rights accusing Helez for historical revisionism and not taking care of veteran population. Helez claimed that Army of the Republic of Bosnia and Herzegovina did not have camps on the territory they held and tried to abolish the status of inmates to persons who have been in ARBiH'S camps. This upset the veterans from the Croatian Defence Council and prisoners of those camps. Croatian Association of Inmates from Homeland War requested Helez's dismissal and accused him for crime hiding. Budimir made an appeal for review of constitutionality of Audit Act to the Constitutional Court of the Federation of Bosnia and Herzegovina. On 11 April 2012, Budimir dissolved the Audit Team for Coordination made by Helez. He did so because review procedure of veterans was running illegally and without supervision of legal representatives of the Croatian Defence Council. However, on 23 May 2012, the Federal government decided to continue with the Audit Act. Local branches of the HSP asked from party's presidency to support Budimir, but both HSP ministers in the Federal Government, Ante Krajina and Vjekoslav Čamber, supported the Audit Act.

During the crisis with the Audit Act, minister Helez details emphasised his activity on the HVO, a Croat military formation during the Bosnian War, thus putting Croat veterans in a difficult position, and moreover, he accused Budimir of being "a false general." On 18 December 2012, the Constitutional Court of the Federation of Bosnia and Herzegovina made a decision that Helez's Audit Act is, however, unconstitutional. This decision of the Constitutional Court led Helez and the Prime Minister Nermin Nikšić in a difficult position, as the Constitutional Court embarrassed Helez for being subjective.

=== New political crisis ===
On 18 June 2012, the SDP made an agreement with the opposition party, the Croatian Democratic Union (HDZ BiH) about the reconstruction of the Federal as well as the state government. Marinko Čavara, Vice President of the HDZ BiH, stated that SDP and HDZ BiH support the reconstruction of the Federal Government, which includes Budimir's removal from office. However, they didn't have two thirds of members in parliament in order to impose this.

On 22 June 2012, after a session of the Federal Government, Budimir accepted resignation of Desnica Radivojević of the Party of Democratic Action from his post as Minister of Trade. Later, Radivojević claimed that he never proposed his resignation. During a session, SDP ministers proposed removals in the management and supervisory boards of public companies that are owned by the Federation. It is taught that this move of SDP was made because the party didn't have control of those companies, and Radivojević would give them majority so that the proposal could pass, even though Radivojević's party opposed such proposal. Radivojević himself stated that his removal is against the Constitution, while Prime Minister Nikšić (SDP), stated that Budmir abused his position as president. However, on 12 July, the graphologist, prof. Esad Bilić, found that Radivojević's signature on resignation is authentic, while Radivojević's charge against Budimir was dismissed. On 10 October 2012 the Constitutional Court of the Federation of Bosnia and Herzegovina made a decision that Budimir's acceptance of Radivojević's resignation is legal after SDP's Prime Minister Nikšić accused Budimir for illegal doing. Nevertheless, the Court said that Budimir should once again consider Radivojveić's will and the circumstances for the resignation. Budimir later said that there is no reason for him to change his decision.

The political crisis in the Federation of Bosnia and Herzegovina started even before SDP's agreement with the HDZ BiH when SDA and SDP entered a conflict in May 2012. As a result, the Federal Parliament become ineffective whilst the Federal Government is still able to make unanimous decisions though with uncertainty and pressure. Budimir made a proposal in June and October to solve the crisis by calling a dissolution of the Federal Parliament and a new election.

On 5 November 2012, at the session of the HSP BiH of the Herzegovina-Neretva Canton, Budimir said that the HSP BiH will not leave the government until HSP BiH's goals are accomplished, namely a law on lustration and implementing inability to outvote Croat ministers in the government.

On 10 December, Nikšić made a request to Budimir to dismiss eight federal ministers, including the deputy prime minister. Those ministers were members of the Party of Democratic Action, the People's Party Work for Betterment and the Croatian Party of Rights. Nikšić explained his move by claiming that certain ministers do not have support in the Federal Parliament and that their presence in the government was damaging its function. However, Budimir decided to listen arguments of the 8 ministers, and meanwhile the Deputy Prime Minister Jerko Ivanković-Lijanović that was supposed to be removed from the office, complained to the Constitutional Court of the Federation of Bosnia and Herzegovina that Nikšić illegally proposed voting in the Federal Parliament for the 2013 budget. Due to this reason, on 20 December, Budimir decided not to remove the 8 ministers from their posts.

On 27 December, he made a decision to withdraw the decision on resignation of Desnica Radivojević. Budimir reassessed his decision as he was advised by the Federal Constitutional Court. In the official statement from his office, it was said that Budimir made this decision in the interest of the Bosnia and Herzegovina citizens and to secure normal functioning of the Federal Government.

On 27 February 2013, Budimir was awarded with an honorary doctorate of public administration by the Sun Moon University in South Korea. He was awarded for his contribution in promotion of world peace.

On 7 March 2013, Budimir announced on a press-conference that he left the HSP BiH due to lack of support during his conflict with minister for veterans and disabled veterans Zukan Helez. He said that he would form a new political party that would be named "Party of Justice and Trust".

On 26 April 2013, he was arrested under accusation that he was part of corrupt activities in Bosnia and Hercegovina. Together with his adviser Hidajet Halilović, at the time head of the entity's amnesty commission, they were charged for taking bribes to approve amnesties. Both were released on 24 May 2013 since there were no evidence of them being guilty.

== Political ideas ==
Budimir advocates the creation of the Posavina district which would, according to Budimir, bring political, economical and social stability into the region. Also, the creation of the Posavina district would, as he thinks, help in return of refugees.

In January 2012, Budimir met with High Representative for Bosnia and Herzegovina, Valentin Inzko, and stated that the two entities in Bosnia and Herzegovina, the Federation and Republika Srpska need to cooperate closer and both Inzko and Budimir agreed that the Federation of Bosnia and Herzegovina needs to be reorganized, especially in reducing its administration so as to gain economic stability.

== Personal life ==
Budimir is married to Darija Kuna. They have three children: a daughter, Lucija, and two sons, Luka and Borna.
