= Niko Lozančić =

Bosnian Croat politician (born 1957)

7th President of the Federation of Bosnia and Herzegovina
- In office 27 January 2003 – 22 February 2007
- Prime Minister: Alija Behmen; Ahmet Hadžipašić
- Vice President: Šahbaz Džihanović; Desnica Radivojević
- Preceded by: Safet Halilović
- Succeeded by: Borjana Krišto
Parliamentary offices
Member of the House of Representatives
In office 22 February 2007 – 9 December 2014
Constituency	4th Electoral Unit FBiH

Personal details
- Born: 3 September 1957 (age 69) Kakanj, PR Bosnia and Herzegovina, FPR Yugoslavia
- Party: Croatian Democratic Union
- Spouse: Sanja Lozančić
- Children: 5

Niko Lozančić (born 3 September 1957) is a Bosnian Croat politician who served as the 7th President of the Federation of Bosnia and Herzegovina from 27 January 2003 until 22 February 2007.

He is a member and former deputy president of the Croatian Democratic Union. Lozančić was also a member of the national House of Representatives from 2007 to 2014. During his time in office, Lozančić served as Chaiman of the House of Representatives two separate times between 2008 and 2010. Professionally, he is a lawyer and a diplomat.
