= Government of the Federation of Bosnia and Herzegovina =

- Vlada Federacije Bosne i Hercegovine; Влада Федерације Босне и Херцеговине
- Government seal

Overview
- Established: 31 May 1994; 32 years ago
- Polity: Federation of Bosnia and Herzegovina
- Leader: Prime Minister
- Main organ: Parliament of the Federation of Bosnia and Herzegovina
- Ministries: 16 (2023)
- Headquarters: Hamdije Čemerlića 2, Sarajevo, Bosnia and Herzegovina
- Website: fbihvlada.gov.ba

The Government of the Federation of Bosnia and Herzegovina, (Note: Bosnian: Vlada Federacije Bosne i Hercegovina; Croatian: Vlada Federacije Bosne i Hercegovine; Serbian: Влада Федерације Босне и Херцеговине) commonly abbreviated to the Federal Government, (Note: Bosnian: Federalna Vlada; Croatian: Federalna Vlada; Serbian: Федерална Влада) is the main executive branch of government in the Federation of Bosnia and Herzegovina, one of the two entities of Bosnia and Herzegovina. It is headed by the prime minister. The Federal president, in agreement with both vice-presidents of the Federation, appoints the Federal Government, upon consultation with a prime minister or a nominee for that office. The Government is elected after its appointment has been confirmed by a majority vote in the Federal House of Representatives.

The Federal Government has a prime minister and 16 ministers. It must be composed of eight Bosniak, five Croat and three Serb ministers. One minister from the minority may be nominated by the Federal prime minister from the quota of the largest constituent people. According to the Constitution, the 15% of the members of the Government must come from one constituent nation. A minimum of 35% of the members of the Government must come from two constituent nations. Also, one member of the Government must come from the group of the Others (minorities). The Federal Government must have two deputy prime ministers from the other two constitutive nations. The Government of the Federation of Bosnia and Herzegovina exercises its executive powers in conformity with the Federal Constitution. The current government is led by Prime Minister Nermin Nikšić.

== Current cabinet ==
The government is structured into the offices for the prime minister, the two deputy prime ministers and 16 ministries.

Nikšić II Cabinet (28 April 2023 – present)
Portfolio	Name	Party	Took office	Left office
Prime Minister	Nermin Nikšić	SDP BiH	28 April 2023	Incumbent
Federal Minister of Finance; Deputy Prime Minister	Toni Kraljević	HDZ BiH	28 April 2023	Incumbent
Federal Minister of Development, Entrepreneurship and Craft; Deputy Prime Minister				Vacant
Federal Minister of Interior	Ramo Isak	SN	28 April 2023	Incumbent
Federal Minister of Justice	Vedran Škobić	HDZ BiH	28 April 2023	Incumbent
Federal Minister of Energy, Mining and Industry	Vedran Lakić	SDP BiH	28 April 2023	Incumbent
Federal Minister of Traffic and Communication	Andrijana Katić	HDZ BiH	28 April 2023	Incumbent
Federal Minister of Work and Social Welfare				Vacant
Federal Minister for Veterans and Disabled Veterans	Nedžad Lokmić	SDP BiH	28 April 2023	Incumbent
Federal Minister of Displaced Persons and Refugees	Nerin Dizdar	SDP BiH	28 April 2023	Incumbent
Federal Minister of Healthcare	Nediljko Rimac	HDZ 1990	28 April 2023	Incumbent
Federal Minister of Education and Science	Jasna Duraković	SDP BiH	28 April 2023	Incumbent
Federal Minister of Culture and Sports	Sanja Vlaisavljević	HDZ BiH	28 April 2023	Incumbent
Federal Minister of Trade	Amir Hasičević	NS	28 April 2023	Incumbent
Federal Minister of Planning	Željko Nedić	HDZ BiH	28 April 2023	Incumbent
Federal Minister of Agriculture, Aquaculture and Forestry	Kemal Hrnjić	NiP	28 April 2023	Incumbent
Federal Minister of Environment and Tourism	Nasiha Pozder	NS	28 April 2023	Incumbent

== See also ==
- List of prime ministers of the Federation of Bosnia and Herzegovina
- President of the Federation of Bosnia and Herzegovina
- List of presidents of the Federation of Bosnia and Herzegovina
