= Party of Justice and Trust =

Party of Justice and Trust Stranka pravde i povjerenja Странка правде и повјерења
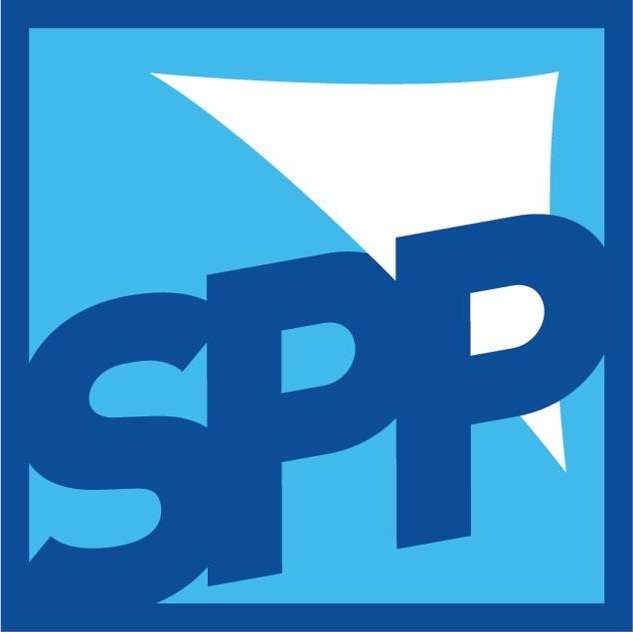
- Abbreviation: SPP
- President: Živko Budimir
- Vice-Presidents: Ragib Hadžić Željko Asić
- Founder: Živko Budimir
- Founded: 13 April 2013
- Dissolved: 12 January 2021
- Split from: HSP BiH
- Headquarters: Sarajevo, Bosnia and Herzegovina
- Membership (2013): 1071
- Ideology: Social conservativism
- Colours: Sky blue

Party of Justice and Trust (Serbo-Croatian: Странка правде и повјерења, romanized: Stranka pravde i povjerenja) was a centre-right political party in Bosnia and Herzegovina formed in 2013 in Sarajevo. Its president and founder was Živko Budimir, formerly a member of the Croatian Party of Rights of Bosnia and Herzegovina and former president of the Federation of Bosnia and Herzegovina. The party was dissolved in 2021.
