= Svetozar Pudarić =

Bosnian politician

Svetozar Pudarić (Sarajevo, 1959 – 9 March 2020) was a Bosnian politician.

== Biography ==
Born in 1959 in Sarajevo, Pudarić completed his studies in archeology at the Faculty of Philosophy in Belgrade in 1983. In 1984, he was employed at the Institute for the Protection of the Cultural, Historical and Natural Heritage of Bosnia and Herzegovina. He worked at the Institute until 1993.

During 1991 and 1992, Pudarić was a member of the Assembly of the City of Sarajevo, and then a member of the War Presidency of the City of Sarajevo. He and his wife Sanda were married in a hospital bed in 1992, in the intensive care unit, after being wounded by the same grenade. They later had three children.

After the war in Bosnia and Herzegovina, he worked as secretary for information in the Social Democratic Party, and as the head of the Office of the President of the Federation of BiH entity, Karlo Filipović.

In the 2002 general elections, Pudarić was elected member of the Assembly of Sarajevo Canton and from there appointed as delegate to the House of Peoples of the Federation of BiH. He was re-elected and re-appointed to such role at the 2006 elections. In the 2010 general elections, he was elected a member of the House of Representatives of the Parliament of the Federation BiH entity, and in March 2011, the entity Parliament elected him as Vice-President of the Federation of Bosnia and Herzegovina from the ranks of the Serb people. He remained in that position until 2015.

In May 2018 Pudarić submitted his candidacy for the 2018 elections as member of the Presidency of Bosnia and Herzegovina from the Serb people. The Central Election Commission of Bosnia and Herzegovina rejected it as Pudarić was resident in the Federation BiH entity, rather than in the Republika Srpska entity, from where the Serb members of the BiH Presidency is elected. Pudarić appealed to the Court of Bosnia and Herzegovina and to the Constitutional Court of Bosnia and Herzegovina, which in turn rejected his case.

Pudarić died of cancer in Sarajevo on March 9, 2020.

In December 2020, on the basis of the Sejdić and Finci case law and of the specular case of Ilijaz Pilav, decided in 2016, the European Court of Human Rights in Strasbourg recognised a violation of the European Convention on Human Rights by Bosnia and Herzegovina against Pudarić. The Court also noted that it is not the Constitution of BiH but its electoral law that introduces a requirement of residence for the candidates to the BiH Presidency; the Court noted that "no legal provision of domestic law should be interpreted and applied in a manner incompatible with States’ obligations under the Convention", particularly since the Constitution of Bosnia and Herzegovina grants “priority over all other law” to the European Convention on Human Rights.
