= Šahbaz Džihanović =

Bosnian politician

Šahbaz Džihanović (born 13 June 1949) was one of the two Vice Presidents of the Federation of Bosnia and Herzegovina from 27 January 2003 to 22 February 2007.
