= Zoran Mandlbaum =

Jewish community leader (1946–2015)

Zoran Mandlbaum (9 September 1946 – 9 November 2015) was the leader of the Jewish community in Mostar, Bosnia and Herzegovina during the Bosnian War. During ethnic conflict between Serbs, Bosniaks and Croats, Mandlbaum served as a liaison or go-between among the different groups. His work during the war to help civilians escape Bosnia and delivering humanitarian aid earned him the nickname "the Oskar Schindler of Bosnia".

== Biography ==
Zoran Mandlbaum was born in Mostar on September 9, 1946. His great-grandfather immigrated to Bosnia from Austria-Hungary, settling in Foča before the family later moved to Mostar in 1905. Mandlbaum's younger brother Zigmund was born in 1948. He studied at the University of Mostar's school of mechanical engineering, and later found a job as the technical director for the SOKO aircraft factory in town.

The war in Bosnia and Herzegovina began in earnest by April 1992, as rival factions representing Bosnian Muslims (Bosniaks), Croats and Serbs began clashing for control of different areas of the country. Because Bosnia's Jewish community is a small minority within the country, it was not considered a target of the paramilitary groups, and therefore were spared some of the violence perpetrated on other ethnic groups. Mandlbaum met with Croatian Defence Council (HVO) commander Vinko Martinović, reminding him of an agreement between Mate Boban, Franjo Tuđman, and the State of Israel which assured safe passage to Israel for Jews living in Herzegovina. Commander Martinović assured Mandlbaum that the Jewish community would not be targeted in this war. Mandlbaum, aware of the role the Righteous Among the Nations played in protecting Jews during the Holocaust, used this opportunity to help his neighbors in Mostar.

Mandlbaum, in a 2012 documentary by the Institute for War and Peace Reporting, said that he tried to help everyone who asked. When the Bosnian government only had the power to operate generators for two hours a day at the East Mostar Hospital, Mandlbaum met with Vladimir Šoljić, a friend and former colleague at the factory, who was also the Minister of Defense for the Croatian Republic of Herzeg-Bosnia. In exchange for a two-hour ceasefire by Safet Oručević's Bosniak forces, Šoljić promised to have his forces cease-fire, and provided a tanker of diesel fuel for the hospital's generator.

Mandlbaum frequently crossed the river separating the two sides of the city of Mostar, delivering parcels, letters, and supplies to people on each side of the conflict. In one instance, he smuggled a young woman into East Mostar to meet with her boyfriend. The couple married later that night, an event that the groom's father said would not have been possible without Mandlbaum's help. He frequently delivered letters and supplies to prisoners at the Heliodrom and Dretelj concentration camps in the area. Between 1993 and 1995, it is estimated that the Jewish community of Mostar sent 106,000 kilograms of food to East Mostar. Similar to the actions of Chiune Sugihara and Jan Zwartendijk, Mandlbaum forged the identity cards of Serbs and Bosniaks to read Jevrejin (Jewish) in order to ensure their safe passage out of Mostar.

While many benefited from Mandlbaum's actions, he was not without his enemies. He was evicted from his apartment and faced numerous attempts on his life. The most famous attempt was on May 30, 1994, when his car was bombed, allegedly on the orders of HVO Commander Misić.

After the war, Mandlbaum remained in Mostar and continued to be the president of the town's remaining Jewish community. Mandlbaum was present for the construction of Mostar's new synagogue, the first new synagogue built in Bosnia since World War II. He also worked with the Federal Ministry of Entrepreneurship and Crafts. In 2005, he testified as a defense witness in the trial of Vinko Martinović for war crimes at the International Tribunal for the Former Yugoslavia.

Mandlbaum's actions during the war became more well-known, and in February 2011, he received the Duško Kondor Award for Civil Courage by the Gardens of the Righteous Foundation.

Mandlbaum died on November 9, 2015, at the age of 69. His funeral was covered by TV1.
