= Ivo Andrić-Lužanski =

Croat politician

President of the Federation of Bosnia and Herzegovina
- In office 1 January 2001 – 28 February 2001
- Vice President: Ejup Ganić
- Preceded by: Ejup Ganić
- Succeeded by: Karlo Filipović
- In office 1 January 1999 – 1 January 2000
- Vice President: Ejup Ganić
- Preceded by: Ejup Ganić
- Succeeded by: Ejup Ganić

Personal details
- Born: 1956 (age 69–70) Živinice, SR Bosnia and Herzegovina, SFR Yugoslavia
- Party: Croatian Democratic Union of Bosnia and Herzegovina

Ivo Andrić-Lužanski (born 1956) is a Croat politician of Bosnia and Herzegovina, a member of the Croatian Democratic Union of Bosnia and Herzegovina.

He was born in Lug in 1956. He served twice as President of the Federation of Bosnia Herzegovina (1 January 1999 – 1 January 2000; 1 January 2001 – 28 February 2001). He served as Vice-President of the Federation of Bosnia and Herzegovina from 1 January 2000 to 1 January 2001.

Later he became a member of Croatian parliament.

Political offices
Preceded by Ejup Ganić	President of the Federation of Bosnia Herzegovina; 1999–2000	Succeeded by Ejup Ganić
Preceded by Ejup Ganić	President of the Federation of Bosnia Herzegovina; 2001	Succeeded by Karlo Filipović
