= Sandžak faction =

Faction of Bosnian government

The Sandžak faction or Sandžak lobby (Sandžački lobi), known in Bosnian as Sandžaklije, was one of the two main divisions of the Bosnian government and the ruling Party of Democratic Action (SDA) during the Bosnian War (1992–95; see Republic of Bosnia and Herzegovina). It was made up of military hardliners and settlers (migrants) from Sandžak, a region divided between SR Serbia and SR Montenegro (see Bosniaks of Serbia and Bosniaks of Montenegro). Commander Sefer Halilović and politician Ejup Ganić belonged to the faction.

According to Sarajevan writer Željko Vuković, Sandžak immigrants controlled most of the municipal, political and military power during the war. On the eve of the war, some 160,000 people of Sandžak origin lived in Sarajevo. There is a view that Sandžak immigrants were prior to the war second-class citizens, who during the war climbed the social ladder.

== Notable people ==
- Sefer Halilović, military commander and politician
- Ramiz Dreković, military commander
- Ejup Ganić, politician
- Selmo Cikotić, military commander and politician
- Ramiz Delalić, military commander
- Fahrudin Radončić, politician

== See also ==
- Herzegovina lobby

== Sources ==
- Burg, Steven L.; Shoup, Paul (1999). The War in Bosnia-Herzegovina: Ethnic Conflict and International Intervention. M.E. Sharpe. pp. 194–. ISBN 978-1-56324-308-0.
- Adil Zulfikarpašić; Milovan Djilas; Nadežda Gaće (1998). The Bosniak. C. Hurst & Co. Publishers. pp. 135–. ISBN 978-1-85065-339-4.
- Woodward, Susan L. (1 April 1995). Balkan Tragedy: Chaos and Dissolution after the Cold War. Brookings Institution. pp. 478–. ISBN 978-0-8157-2295-3.
- Helms, Elissa (17 February 2016). The New Bosnian Mosaic: Identities, Memories and Moral Claims in a Post-War Society. Routledge. pp. 72–. ISBN 978-1-317-02308-1.
