= Herzegovina lobby =

Disputed term in Croatia

The Herzegovina lobby or Herzegovinian lobby (Bosnian and Croatian: Hercegovački lobi) is a disputed term that emerged in Croatia in the 1990s for the alleged disproportional influence of Croats from the Herzegovina region of Bosnia and Herzegovina on the politics of Croatia. At times it has been described it as a major factor in contemporary Croatian politics and the most powerful lobby in Croatia, it is also viewed as a stereotype, pejorative, and nonexistent.

Proponents of the existence of such a lobby claim that it helped fund Croatia's wartime president Franjo Tuđman, his Croatian Democratic Union (HDZ) political party, and his involvement in the Bosnian War, during which the lobby openly advocated annexing Herzegovina. During the Bosnian War, Croats in Herzegovina were more interested in unifying with Croatia than being a part of an independent Bosniak-dominated Bosnia and Herzegovina. Due to the strength of the Herzegovina lobby in Zagreb, moderate Bosnian Croats were ineffective primarily in influencing Croatian foreign policy on Bosnia and Herzegovina. Many extremists from Herzegovina served in the Croatian police force and participated in skirmishes with Serbs. By late 1991, about 20,000 Croats in Bosnia and Herzegovina, mainly from the Herzegovina region, enlisted in the Croatian National Guard.

The Herzegovina lobby's bonding in Croatia began with Tuđman's ouster of Stjepan Kljuić, the moderate and independent elected leader of the Bosnian branch of the HDZ, and replacement with Mate Boban. Boban, who favoured Croatia to annexe Croat-inhabited parts of Bosnia and Herzegovina, was in charge of advancing the lobby's agenda in Bosnia and Herzegovina. A rift existed in the HDZ between Croats from ethnically mixed central and northern Bosnia areas and those from Herzegovina. After Croats in Bosnia and Herzegovina gained the ability to vote in Croatia's elections, they played a growing role in the country's politics. The approximately 365,000 Croats of Bosnia and Herzegovina consistently voted for the HDZ. In the 1994 elections, the Croatian diaspora received twelve to fourteen of the 164 seats in the Croatian Parliament, significantly larger than its share of Croatia's population. The lobby was accused of behaving Mafia-likely due to their corruption and violence in Croatia.

Gojko Šušak, who believed in a Greater Croatia, played a vital role in funding the HDZ. He was considered the leader of the Herzegovina lobby and was "adept at tapping the purses of the tight-knit Herzegovinian community in the Americas, delivering millions of dollars worth of contributions to Tuđman's campaign." He provided the HDZ a critical advantage over the political opposition and for his efforts became the Croatian Minister of Defence. Several other top positions within the HDZ government were also secured. In his position he protected and promoted generals from Herzegovina in the Croatian Army and acted as a "conduit" of Croatian support for Croat separatism in Bosnia and Herzegovina. At its peak the amount of money from Croatia that funded the Croatian Defence Council surpassed $500,000 per day. After Šušak's death in 1998, Ivić Pašalić took over as head of the lobby. By 2000, about 300 million euros were transferred by the Croatian government into Herzegovina each year, mostly from the budget of the Ministries of Defence, Reconstruction, and Social Affairs.

The existence of such a lobby has been widely criticized and described as a conspiracy theory, as it "never existed, but was created as a figment of someone's imagination and the belief that the politicians in Zagreb originating from Herzegovina aided their homeland." Croatian-American historian James J. Sadkovich wrote that "claims that the Croatian president was manipulated by Šušak and a "Herzegovina lobby" are as difficult to document as allegations that the Croatian diaspora made HDZ policy." After the international recognition of Croatia in January 1992, the Herzegovinian identity in some media worsened and stereotype views were promoted. Political opponents of Tuđman spread animosity towards Herzegovina and Herzegovinians. After a failed coup by Stjepan Mesić and Josip Manolić in the HDZ in 1993, Manolić accused the "Herzegovina lobby" for everything wrong in the party. Such views were fueled by the weekly Feral Tribune which denigrated Herzegovina in its texts. The anti-Herzegovinian hysteria reached a culmination on the eve and aftermath of the 2000 parliamentary election. However, after 2000 the imposed stereotypes and usage of the term decreased.

== See also ==
- Sandžak faction
