= Ejup Ganić =

Bosnian engineer, politician and academic (born 1946)

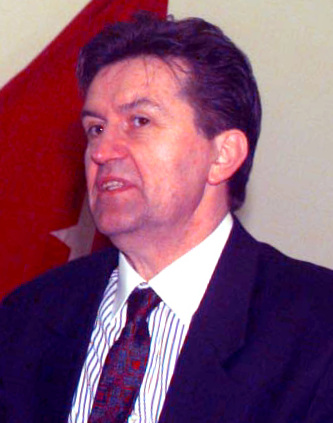
- Ganić in 1996

Chancellor of the Sarajevo School of Science and Technology
- Incumbent
- Assumed office 1 October 2004

President of the Federation of Bosnia and Herzegovina
- In office 1 January 2000 – 1 January 2001
- Preceded by: Ivo Andrić-Lužanski
- Succeeded by: Ivo Andrić-Lužanski
- In office 29 December 1997 – 1 January 1999
- Preceded by: Vladimir Šoljić
- Succeeded by: Ivo Andrić-Lužanski

Member of the Presidency of the Republic of Bosnia and Herzegovina
- In office 20 December 1990 – 5 October 1996

Personal details
- Born: 3 March 1946 (age 80) Novi Pazar, SR Serbia, SFR Yugoslavia
- Party: Party of Democratic Action (1990−2000)
- Education: University of Belgrade (BS, MS); Massachusetts Institute of Technology (ScD)

Ejup Ganić (born 3 March 1946) is a Bosnian engineer, politician and academic who served as President of the Federation of Bosnia and Herzegovina from 1997 to 1999 and from 2000 to 2001. A former member of the Party of Democratic Action, he also served as member of the Presidency of the Republic of Bosnia and Herzegovina from 1990 to 1996.

Ganić holds an ScD from the Massachusetts Institute of Technology. He is the founder and current chancellor of the Sarajevo School of Science and Technology.

== Early life and education ==
Ganić was born on 3 March 1946 in Sebečevo village near Novi Pazar in the Sandžak geographical region of Serbia, then a part of SFR Yugoslavia. He graduated from the University of Belgrade, and holds an ScD in engineering science from the prestigious Massachusetts Institute of Technology.

== Political career ==
During the Bosnian War, Ganić served in the Presidency of the Republic of Bosnia and Herzegovina. He was a member of the Party of Democratic Action (SDA) between 1990 and 2000. During the war, the Bosnian government and the SDA were divided into two groups, one that looked to the West, and the other, called the Sandžak faction, hardliners that wished to take on all. Another division was between the secularists and conservatists. Ganić was part of the Sandžak faction and the conservatists.

During early talks of the partition of Bosnia and Herzegovina, Ganić remarked that the Bosniaks "are Islamized Serbs", and should thus join the Serb side, at a time when the SDA shifted in favour of siding with the Serbs and continuing struggling against the Croats. Following the war, Ganić served as Vice-President, and then as President of the Federation of Bosnia and Herzegovina from 1997 to 1999, and again from 2000 to 2001.

== Academic career ==
Ganić is the founder and current chancellor of the Sarajevo School of Science and Technology, as well as a regular professor of engineering science at the university. He also worked as an assistant researcher at the Massachusetts Institute of Technology, assistant lecturer at New York University and the University of Chicago, lecturer at University of Illinois Chicago, director of the Sarajevo-based UNIS Institute and guest lecturer at the Moscow State University.

Ganić has published over one hundred publications, among them books such as Handbook of Heat Transfer Fundamentals, Experimental Heat Transfer and Engineering Turbulence Modelling and Measurements. In 2002, he published a book called Engineering Companion, published by McGraw Hill. He is a member of the American Nuclear Society and many other professional societies.

== Arrest and release ==
On 1 March 2010, Ganić was arrested at Heathrow Airport in London after Serbian judicial authorities issued an extradition warrant. He was accused of conspiracy to murder 40 Yugoslav People's Army (JNA) soldiers in the Dobrovoljačka Street attack in May 1992. He was released on 12 March after Sanela Diana Jenkins had paid his bail. Judge John Laws remarked that the arrest warrant by Serbia was politically motivated and therefore granted Ganić bail. It was also claimed by Ganić's defence lawyers that Serbia had yet to produce any real evidence, and that most of their supposed evidence was made up of news articles regarding the Dobrovoljačka incident. However, the Serbian prosecutor's office claimed that the case contained additional evidence.

On 27 July 2010, the City of Westminster Magistrates' Court blocked his extradition and released him, the judge saying that he was led to believe the extradition proceedings were "brought and [were] being used for political purposes, and as such amount to an abuse of the process of this court".

== War crime charges ==
In April 2022, a Sarajevo court charged Ganić and nine other former Bosniak political and military leaders with war crimes over the incident. They were accused of having "planned, attacked and incited [others to attack] the undefended convoy.. escorted by the UN peace forces", as well as having failed to either prevent the killings or punish the perpetrators of the attack. In July 2022, they pled not guilty in court.
