= Vice-President of the Federation of Bosnia and Herzegovina =

Vice presidents of the Federation of Bosnia and Herzegovina
- Potpredsjednici Federacije Bosne i Hercegovine
- Incumbent; Refik Lendo and Igor Stojanović since 28 February 2023
- Nominator: House of Peoples of the Federation of Bosnia and Herzegovina
- Appointer: Parliament of the Federation of Bosnia and Herzegovina
- Term length: 4 years, renewable once
- Inaugural holder: Ejup Ganić
- Formation: 31 May 1994
- Website: http://www.fbihpotpredsjednik.gov.ba/ http://potpredsjednikfbih.gov.ba/

The Federation of Bosnia and Herzegovina has two vice presidents indirectly elected by the two chambers of the Parliament of the Federation of Bosnia and Herzegovina, each representing a constituent nation he was elected from. The President of the Federation of Bosnia and Herzegovina and the two vice presidents must, by law, be members of the three different constituent peoples of Bosnia and Herzegovina.

Below is a list of office-holders:

Name	Entered office	Left office	Party
Ejup Ganić	31 May 1994	29 December 1997	SDA
Vladimir Šoljić	29 December 1997	1 January 1999	HDZ BiH
Ejup Ganić	1 January 1999	1 January 2000	SDA
Ivo Andrić-Lužanski	1 January 2000	1 January 2001	HDZ BiH
Ejup Ganić	1 January 2001	28 February 2001	Independent
Safet Halilović	28 February 2001	1 January 2002	SBiH
Karlo Filipović	1 January 2002	27 January 2003	SDP BiH
Šahbaz Džihanović; Desnica Radivojević	27 January 2003	22 February 2007	SBiH; SDA
Mirsad Kebo; Spomenka Mičić	22 February 2007	17 March 2011	SDA; SBiH
Mirsad Kebo; Svetozar Pudarić	17 March 2011	9 February 2015	SDA; SDP BiH
Melika Mahmutbegović; Milan Dunović	9 February 2015	28 February 2023	SDA; DF
Refik Lendo; Igor Stojanović	28 February 2023	Incumbent	SDA; SDP BiH

== See also ==
- List of presidents of the Federation of Bosnia and Herzegovina
- Presidency of Bosnia and Herzegovina
