= Vladimir Šoljić =

Bosnian politician (born 1943)

- Šoljić in 2011

2nd President of the Federation of Bosnia and Herzegovina
- In office 18 March 1997 – 29 December 1997
- Prime Minister: Edhem Bičakčić
- Vice President: Ejup Ganić
- Preceded by: Krešimir Zubak
- Succeeded by: Ejup Ganić

Personal details
- Born: 19 October 1943 (age 82) Mostar, PR Bosnia and Herzegovina, FPR Yugoslavia
- Party: Croatian Democratic Union of Bosnia and Herzegovina

Vladimir Šoljić (born 19 October 1943) is a Bosnian Croat politician who served as the second President of the Federation of Bosnia and Herzegovina in 1997.

== Biography ==
Šoljić was born on 19 October 1943. He worked at the SOKO aircraft factory in Mostar for many years.

During the Bosnian War, Šoljić served a variety of ministerial positions within the Croatian Republic of Herzeg-Bosnia, including minister of energy industry and mining as well as minister of defense. During his time as Minister of Defence, he was approached by Zoran Mandlbaum, head of the Jewish community in Mostar. Šoljić's forces provided a brief ceasefire so a diesel tanker could provide East Mostar Hospital with fuel for their generator.

After the war, he was chosen by the Federal Parliament to serve as President of the Federation of Bosnia and Herzegovina. Šoljić served from 18 March to 29 December 1997. He and his deputy, Bosniak Ejup Ganić, had little influence in policymaking, and were under pressure from the international community, the High Representative for Bosnia and Herzegovina and the Bosniak and Croat members of the National Presidency. He was Vice-President of the Federation of Bosnia and Herzegovina from December 1997 to January 1999.

On 24 May 1997, Šoljić became a founding member of the Croatian Community of Herzeg-Bosnia. This organization aimed not to create a new Croat entity, but to connect Croats across the country and determine strategic directions for national, cultural, and economic development. He served as president until 17 April 2010, when he became an emeritus member of the organization's general council.
