= Safet Halilović =

Bosnian politician and professor (1951–2017)

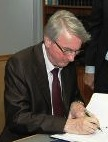
- Halilović signing the Hague Maintenance Convention in 2011

6th President of the Federation of Bosnia and Herzegovina
- In office 1 January 2002 – 27 January 2003
- Prime Minister: Alija Behmen
- Preceded by: Karlo Filipović
- Succeeded by: Niko Lozančić
Ministerial offices
Minister of Human Rights and Refugees
In office 11 January 2007 – 12 January 2012
Prime Minister	Nikola Špirić
Preceded by	Mirsad Kebo
Succeeded by	Damir Ljubić
Minister of Civil Affairs
In office 23 December 2002 – 11 January 2007
Prime Minister	Adnan Terzić
Preceded by	Svetozar Mihajlović (as Minister of Civil Affairs and Communication)
Succeeded by	Sredoje Nović

Personal details
- Born: 3 April 1951 Bosanska Gradiška, SR Bosnia and Herzegovina, SFR Yugoslavia
- Died: 10 May 2017 (aged 66) Sarajevo, Bosnia and Herzegovina
- Party: Party for Bosnia and Herzegovina (1996–2017)
- Other political affiliations: Party of Democratic Action (1990–1996)
- Education: University of Sarajevo (BA, MA, PhD)

Safet Halilović (3 April 1951 – 10 May 2017) was a Bosnian politician and professor who served as the 6th President of the Federation of Bosnia and Herzegovina from 2002 to 2003. He later served as Minister of Civil Affairs from 2002 to 2007 and as Minister of Human Rights and Refugees from 2007 to 2012.

Halilović joined the Party of Democratic Action in 1990, before leaving it and joining the Party for Bosnia and Herzegovina in 1996.

== Early life and education ==
Halilović was born in Orahova, Gradiška. He later attended the University of Sarajevo, graduating in 1974 from the Faculty of Political Sciences. He obtained a doctorate in politics in 1988.

Halilović was president of "Renaissance", a Bosniak cultural association, from 1990 to 1992. He was then president of the Bosnian Cultural Center in Sarajevo from 1995 to 1998.

== Political career ==
Halilović entered politics as a member of the Party of Democratic Action (SDA) upon the party's foundation in 1990. He eventually left the SDA to join the Party for Bosnia and Herzegovina, getting elected as its secretary general in May 1996. Halilović served as Vice-President of the Federation of Bosnia and Herzegovina from February 2001 to January 2002. Then he served as the President of the Federation of Bosnia and Herzegovina from 1 January 2002 until 27 January 2003.

Halilović would then serve in government, being appointed Minister of Civil Affairs on 23 December 2002, serving until 11 January 2007. He then served as Minister of Human Rights and Refugees from 11 January 2007 to 12 January 2012.

== Death ==
Halilović died in Sarajevo on 10 May 2017 at the age of 66.

Political offices
Preceded by Karlo Filipović	President of the Federation of Bosnia and Herzegovina; 2002–2003	Succeeded by Niko Lozančić
Preceded by Svetozar Mihajlović (as Minister of Civil Affairs and Communication)	Minister of Civil Affairs; 2002–2007	Succeeded by Sredoje Nović
Preceded by Mirsad Kebo	Minister of Human Rights and Refugees; 2007–2012	Succeeded by Damir Ljubić
