= Karlo Filipović =

President of Bosnia Herzegovina, 2001–02

President of the Federation of Bosnia and Herzegovina
- In office 28 February 2001 – 1 January 2002
- Vice President: Safet Halilović
- Preceded by: Ivo Andrić-Lužanski
- Succeeded by: Safet Halilović

Personal details
- Born: 10 July 1954 (age 71) Ilijaš, SR Bosnia and Herzegovina, SFR Yugoslavia
- Party: Social Democratic Party

Karlo Filipović (born 10 July 1954) was the President of the Federation of Bosnia Herzegovina from 27 February 2001 to 1 January 2002. He served as Vice-President of the Federation of Bosnia and Herzegovina from 1 January 2002 to 27 January 2003.

Political offices
Preceded by Ivo Andrić-Lužanski	President of the Federation of Bosnia Herzegovina; 2001–2002	Succeeded by Safet Halilović
