= Lidija Bradara =

Bosnian Croat politician (born 1971)

11th President of the Federation of Bosnia and Herzegovina
- Incumbent
- Assumed office 28 February 2023
- Prime Minister: Fadil Novalić; Nermin Nikšić
- Vice President: Refik Lendo; Igor Stojanović
- Preceded by: Marinko Čavara
Parliamentary offices
Member of the House of Peoples
In office
28 February 2019 – 16 February 2023

Personal details
- Born: 17 August 1971 (age 55) Kiseljak, SR Bosnia and Herzegovina, SFR Yugoslavia
- Party: Croatian Democratic Union (2000–present)
- Spouse: Šimo Bradara
- Children: 1
- Education: University of Sarajevo (BBA)

Lidija Bradara (née Lončar; born 17 August 1971) is a Bosnian Croat politician serving as the 11th and current president of the Federation of Bosnia and Herzegovina since 2023. She was previously a member of the national House of Peoples from 2019 to 2023. She was also a member of the Federal House of Peoples from 2005 to 2010 and again from 2014 to 2018, and the Assembly of the Central Bosnia Canton from 2002 to 2010 and from 2014 to 2018.

Bradara has been a member of the Croatian Democratic Union since 2000. She has been a part of the party's presidency since 2003, and has been the director of the party's Political Academy since 2010.

== Early life and education ==
Bradara was born on 17 August 1971 in Kiseljak, where she completed both her elementary and high school education. In 1998, she graduated from the University of Sarajevo School of Economics and Business with a bachelor's degree in business administration.

== Career ==
Bradara joined the Croatian Democratic Union in 2000 and began her career in public service as a civil servant in the municipality of Kiseljak. Bradara was elected to the Assembly of the Central Bosnia Canton in the 2002 general election and re-elected in 2006. From 2005 to 2010, she also served as a delegate in the Federal House of Peoples.

In the 2010 general election, she ran for a seat in the national House of Representatives but was not elected. She returned to the Assembly of the Central Bosnia Canton following the 2014 general election and again served as a delegate in the Federal House of Peoples until 2018.

After the 2018 general election, Bradara became a member of the national House of Peoples. In the 2022 general election, she was elected to the Federal House of Representatives. Following the formation of a governing coalition, she was appointed President of the Federation of Bosnia and Herzegovina in February 2023.

== Controversies ==
From 2011 to 2012, Bradara received the controversial so-called bijeli hljeb (“white bread”), a post-mandate financial benefit for former officials, amounting to 30,802.90 km (approximately €15,750). The practice has been widely criticized as a misuse of public funds.

In 2017, the Center for Investigative Reporting reported that five out of eight of Bradara's advisors as the Chair of the Federal House of Peoples did not meet the legal requirement for the job, which is five years of professional experience.

As a member of the national House of Peoples, Bradara voted in November 2021 to abolish an amendment introduced by High Representative Valentin Inzko that criminalized the denial of the Srebrenica genocide.

In March 2022, she abstained from voting on a proposal by Denis Bećirović, calling for Bosnia and Herzegovina to align its foreign policy with the European Union regarding sanctions on Russia following the invasion of Ukraine, effectively preventing the possibility of the country imposing sanctions on Russia.

In March 2023, Bradara, as the newly appointed President of the Federation of Bosnia and Herzegovina, faced criticism for remarks concerning Dario Kordić, a convicted war criminal sentenced to 25 years in prison for war crimes committed during the Croat–Bosniak War, including the 1993 Ahmići massacre. Referring to Kordić as a friend, she suggested "he was no longer a war criminal after serving his sentence". Her comments drew condemnation from human rights organizations and the Office of the High Representative, which reiterated that war crimes convictions remain valid regardless of time served. Further controversy arose after a photo emerged showing Bradara with Kordić, prompting accusations of glorifying individuals convicted of war crimes.

== Personal life ==
Bradara is married to Šimo Bradara. They have one daughter, Mihaela. They live in Kiseljak.
