= Federation of Bosnia and Herzegovina =

Political entity of Bosnia and Herzegovina

Federation of Bosnia and Herzegovina Federacija Bosne i Hercegovine Федерација Босне и Херцеговине
- Federal entity of Bosnia and Herzegovina
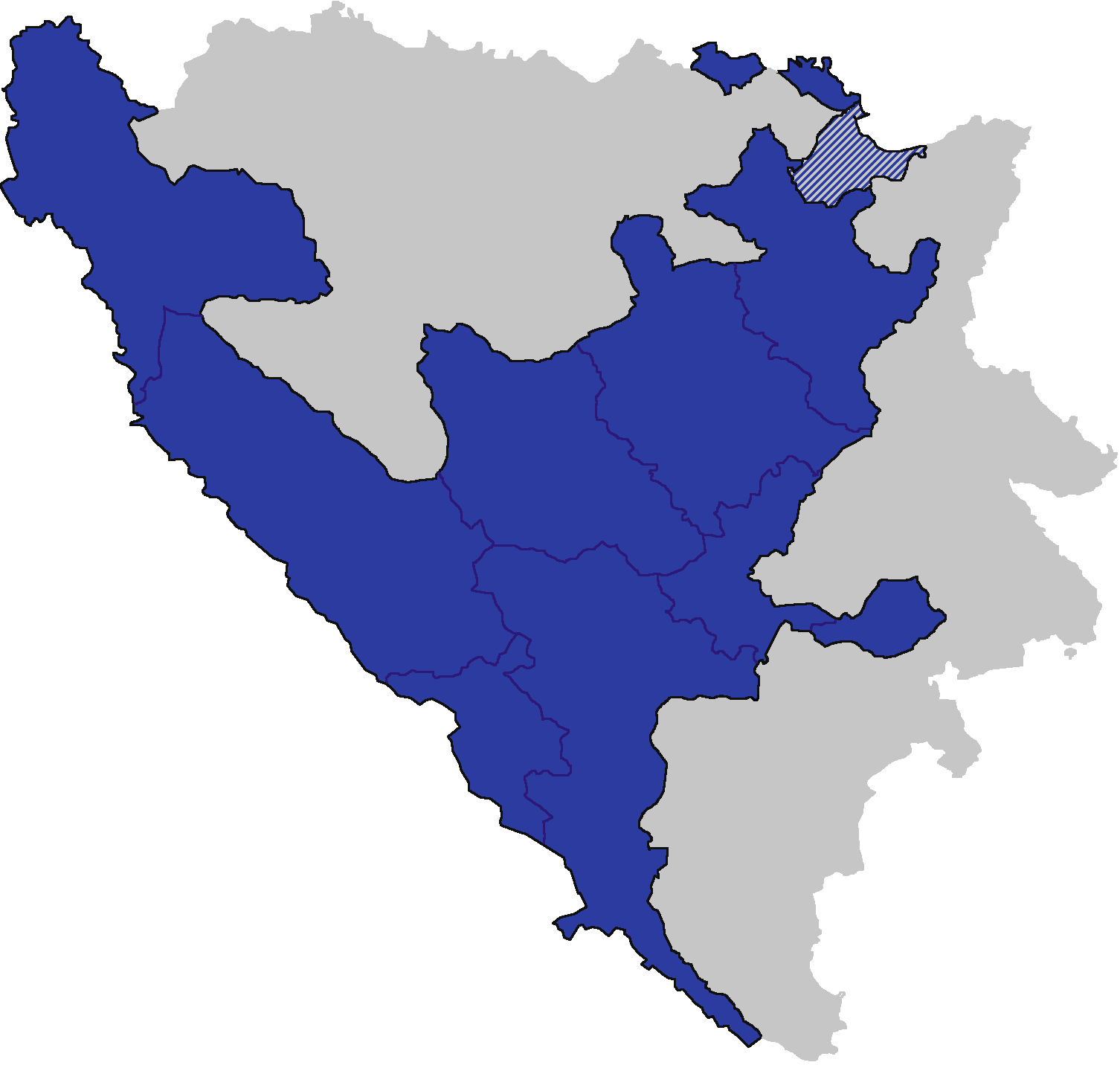
- Location of the Federation of Bosnia and Herzegovina (blue) within Bosnia and Herzegovina. The striped area is Brčko District.^{a}
- Country: Bosnia and Herzegovina
- Washington Agreement: 18 March 1994
- Recognized as part of Bosnia and Herzegovina: 14 December 1995
- Capital and largest city: Sarajevo; 43°51′30″N 18°24′50″E
- Official languages: Bosnian; Croatian; Serbian
- Ethnic groups (2013): 70.40% Bosniaks; 22.44% Croats; 2.55% Serbs; 4.61% other
- Government: Federal parliamentary state
  - President: Lidija Bradara
  - Vice Presidents: Refik Lendo; Igor Stojanović
  - Prime Minister: Nermin Nikšić
- Legislature: Parliament
  - Upper house: House of Peoples
  - Lower house: House of Representatives

Area
  - Total: 26,110.5 km^{2} (10,081.3 sq mi)

Population
  - 2013 census: 2,219,220
  - Density: 91/km^{2} (235.7/sq mi)
- GDP (nominal): 2023 estimate
  - Total: $17.602 billion
  - Per capita: $8,187
- Currency: Convertible mark^{b} (BAM)
- Time zone: UTC+01:00 (CET)
  - Summer (DST): UTC+02:00 (CEST)
- Calling code: +387
- ISO 3166 code: BA-BIH
- ^{a} Formally, Brčko District is held in condominium by both entities of Bosnia and Herzegovina (namely, the Federation of Bosnia and Herzegovina and Republika Srpska). De facto, however, it is a third entity, as it has the same powers as the Federation and Republika Srpska and is under the direct sovereignty of BiH.^{b} Latin version

The Federation of Bosnia and Herzegovina (Serbo-Croatian: Federacija Bosne i Hercegovine / Федерација Босне и Херцеговине, pronounced [federǎːtsija bôsneː i xěrtseɡoʋineː]) is one of the two federal entities of Bosnia and Herzegovina, the other being Republika Srpska. The Federation of Bosnia and Herzegovina consists of ten autonomous cantons with their governments and legislatures.

The Federation was created by the 1994 Washington Agreement, which ended the Croat–Bosniak War within the Bosnian War, and established a constituent assembly that continued its work until October 1996. The Federation has a capital, government, president, parliament, customs and police departments and two postal systems. It occupies about half of Bosnia and Herzegovina's land. From 1996 until 2005, it had its own army, the Army of the Federation of Bosnia and Herzegovina, which was later merged into the Armed Forces of Bosnia and Herzegovina. The capital and largest city is Sarajevo with 275,524 inhabitants.

== History ==
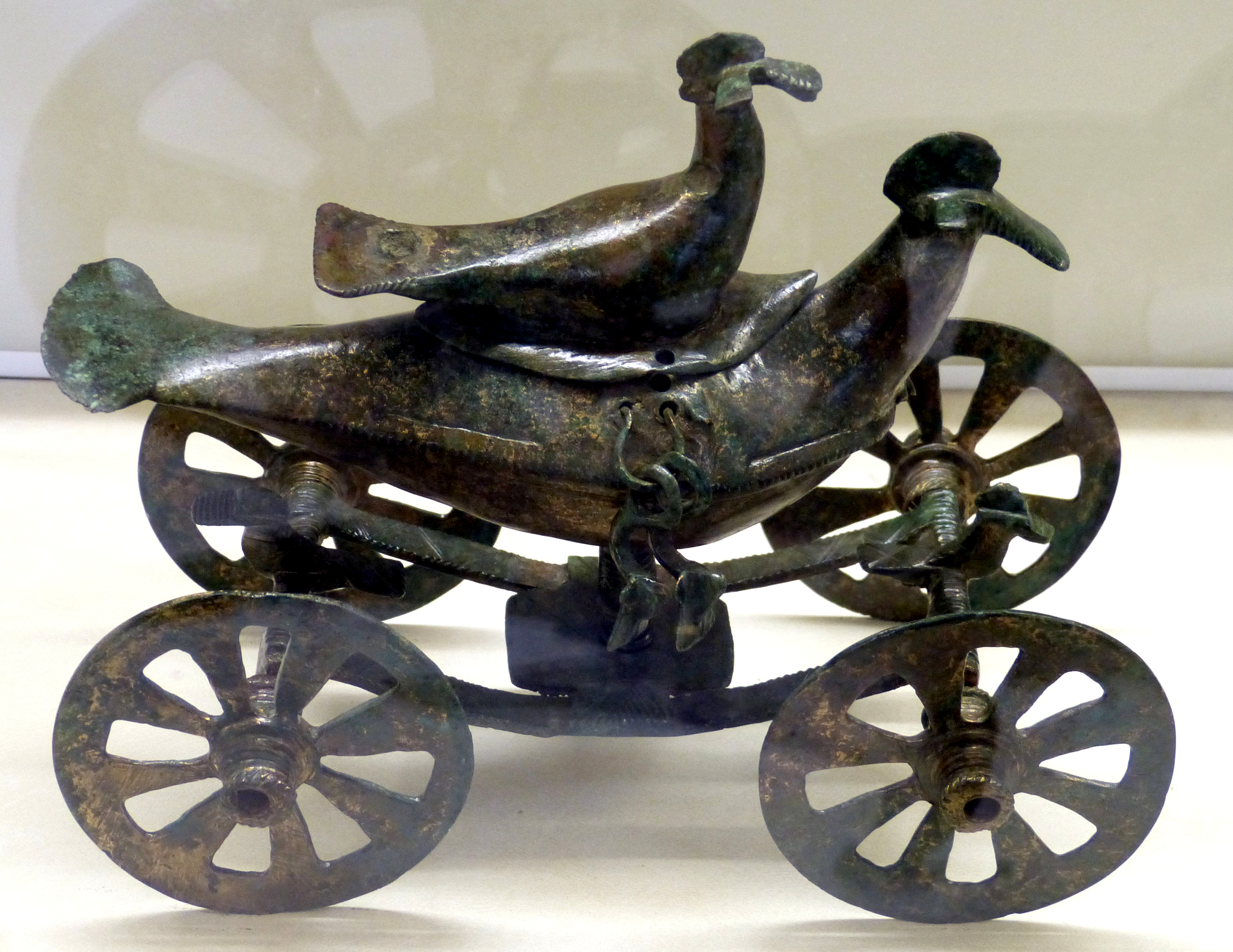
Iron Age cult carriage from Banjani, near Sokolac

=== Early history ===
The areas in what is now the modern day Federation of Bosnia and Herzegovina have been inhabited since at least the Paleolithic era. Notably, the Badanj Cave near Stolac features one of the oldest known cave engravings, depicting an animal figure believed to be a horse, dating back to approximately 13,000 to 12,000 BC. During the Neolithic period, significant cultures such as the Butmir and Kakanj emerged along the Bosna River. The Butmir culture, flourishing around 5100 to 4500 BC, is renowned for its distinctive ceramics and anthropomorphic figurines. Excavations near Sarajevo have uncovered intricately decorated pottery and realistic human figurines from this culture.

From the 8th century BCE, Illyrian tribes evolved into kingdoms. The most notable Illyrian kingdoms and dynasties were those of Bardylis of the Dardani and of Agron of the Ardiaei who created the last and best-known Illyrian kingdom. Agron ruled over the Ardiaei and had extended his rule to other tribes as well. From the 7th century BCE, bronze was replaced by iron, after which only jewelry and art objects were still made out of bronze. Illyrian tribes, under the influence of Hallstatt cultures to the north, formed regional centers that were slightly different. Parts of Central Bosnia were inhabited by the Daesitiates tribe. The Iron Age Glasinac-Mati culture is associated with the Autariatae tribe.

A very important role in their life was the cult of the dead, which is seen in their careful burials and burial ceremonies, as well as the richness of their burial sites. In the 4th century BCE, the first invasion of Celts was recorded. They brought the technique of the pottery wheel, new types of fibulas and different bronze and iron belts. They only passed through en route to Greece.

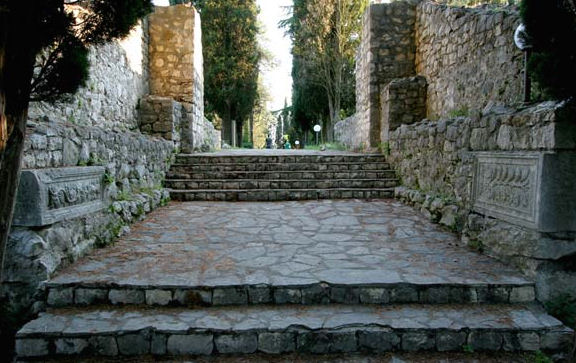
Mogorjelo, an ancient Roman suburban Villa Rustica from the 4th century, near Čapljina

In the Neretva Delta in the south, there were important Hellenistic influences of the Illyrian Daors tribe. Their capital was Daorson in Ošanići near Stolac. Daorson, in the 4th century BCE, was surrounded by megalithic, 5 m high stonewalls (as large as those of Mycenae in Greece), composed of large trapezoid stone blocks. Daors made unique bronze coins and sculptures.

Conflict between the Illyrians and Romans started in 229 BCE, but Rome did not complete its annexation of the region until AD 9. It was precisely in modern-day Bosnia and Herzegovina that Rome fought one of the most difficult battles in its history since the Punic Wars, as described by the Roman historian Suetonius. This was the Roman campaign against Illyricum, known as Bellum Batonianum. The conflict arose after an attempt to recruit Illyrians, and a revolt spanned for four years (6–9 AD), after which they were subdued. In the Roman period, Latin-speaking settlers from the entire Roman Empire settled among the Illyrians, and Roman soldiers were encouraged to retire in the region. After the split of the Empire between 337 and 395 AD, Dalmatia and Pannonia became parts of the Western Roman Empire. The region was conquered by the Ostrogoths in 455 AD. It subsequently changed hands between the Alans and the Huns. By the 6th century, Emperor Justinian I had reconquered the area for the Byzantine Empire. Slavs overwhelmed the Balkans in the 6th and 7th centuries. Illyrian cultural traits were adopted by the South Slavs, as evidenced in certain customs and traditions, and placenames.

=== Middle Ages ===
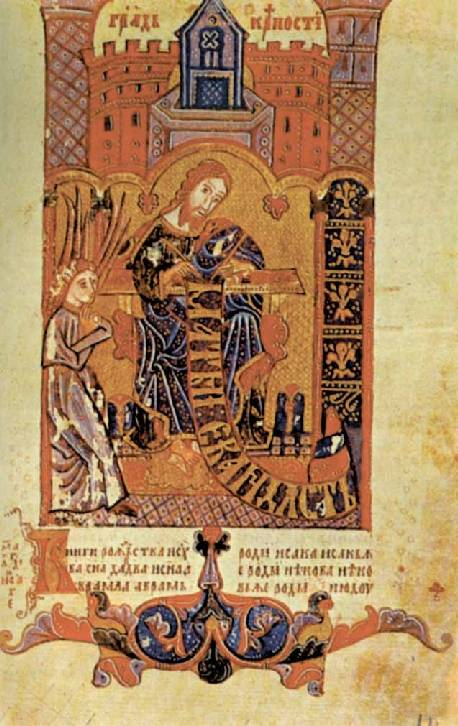
Hval's Codex, illustrated Slavic manuscript from medieval Bosnia

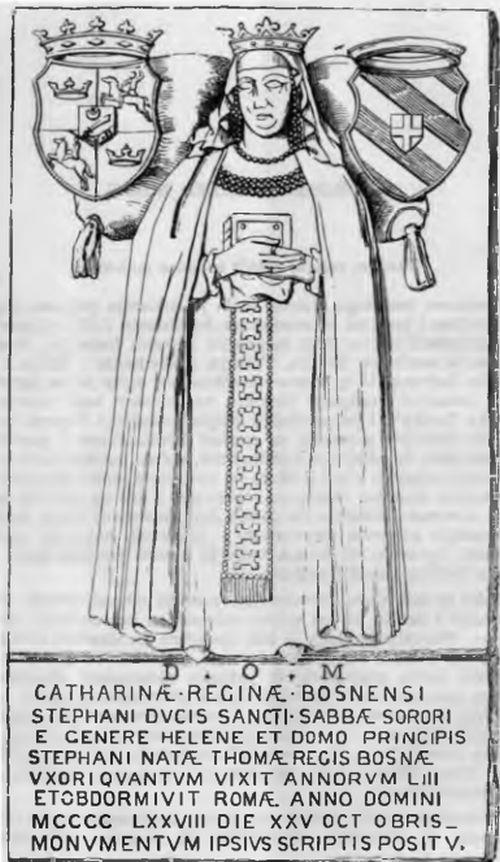
Ledger stone to Queen Catherine of Bosnia, the last queen of the House of Kosača.

The Early Slavs raided the Western Balkans, including the present day Federation of Bosnia and Herzegovina, in the 6th and early 7th century (amid the Migration Period), and were composed of small tribal units drawn from a single Slavic confederation known to the Byzantines as the Sclaveni (whilst the related Antes, roughly speaking, colonized the eastern portions of the Balkans). Tribes recorded by the ethnonyms of "Serb" and "Croat" are described as a second, later, migration of different people during the second quarter of the 7th century who could not have been particularly numerous; these early "Serb" and "Croat" tribes, whose exact identity is subject to scholarly debate, came to predominate over the Slavs in the neighbouring regions. According to Noel Malcolm, the tribal Croats "settled in an area roughly corresponding to modern Croatia, and probably also including most of Bosnia proper, apart from the eastern strip of the Drina valley" while the tribal Serbs settled an area "corresponding to modern south-western Serbia (later known as Raška), and gradually extended their rule into the territories of Duklja and Hum". John Van Antwerp Fine Jr., on the other hand, describes the settling of the tribal Croats to involve Croatia, Dalmatia and Western Bosnia, with the rest of Bosnia seemingly being a territory between early Serb and Croat rule.

Bosnia is also believed to be first mentioned as a land (horion Bosona) in Byzantine Emperor Constantine Porphyrogenitus' De Administrando Imperio in the mid 10th century, at the end of a chapter entitled Of the Serbs and the country in which they now dwell. This has been scholarly interpreted in several ways and used especially by the Serb national ideologists to prove Bosnia as originally a "Serb" land. Other scholars have asserted the inclusion of Bosnia in the chapter to merely be the result of Serbian Grand Duke Časlav's temporary rule over Bosnia at the time, while also pointing out Porphyrogenitus does not say anywhere explicitly that Bosnia is a "Serb land". In fact, the very translation of the critical sentence where the word Bosona (Bosnia) appears is subject to varying interpretation. In time, Bosnia formed a unit under its own ruler, who called himself Bosnian. Bosnia, along with other territories, became part of Duklja in the 11th century, although it retained its own nobility and institutions.

Bosnia in the Middle Ages spanning the Banate of Bosnia and the succeeding Kingdom of Bosnia

In the High Middle Ages, political circumstance led to the area being contested between the Kingdom of Hungary and the Byzantine Empire. Following another shift of power between the two in the early 12th century, Bosnia found itself outside the control of both and emerged as the Banate of Bosnia (under the rule of local bans). The first Bosnian ban known by name was Ban Borić. The second was Ban Kulin, whose rule marked the start of a controversy involving the Bosnian Church – considered heretical by the Roman Catholic Church. In response to Hungarian attempts to use church politics regarding the issue as a way to reclaim sovereignty over Bosnia, Kulin held a council of local church leaders to renounce the heresy and embraced Catholicism in 1203. Despite this, Hungarian ambitions remained unchanged long after Kulin's death in 1204, waning only after an unsuccessful invasion in 1254. During this time, the population was called Dobri Bošnjani ("Good Bosnians"). The names Serb and Croat, though occasionally appearing in peripheral areas, were not used in Bosnia proper.

Bosnian history from then until the early 14th century was marked by a power struggle between the Šubić and Kotromanić families. This conflict came to an end in 1322, when Stephen II Kotromanić became Ban. By the time of his death in 1353, he was successful in annexing territories to the north and west, as well as Zahumlje and parts of Dalmatia. He was succeeded by his ambitious nephew Tvrtko who, following a prolonged struggle with nobility and inter-family strife, gained full control of the country in 1367. By the year 1377, Bosnia was elevated into a kingdom with the coronation of Tvrtko as the first Bosnian King in Mile near Visoko in the Bosnian heartland.

Following his death in 1391, however, Bosnia fell into a long period of decline. The Ottoman Empire had started its conquest of Europe and posed a major threat to the Balkans throughout the first half of the 15th century. Finally, after decades of political and social instability, the Kingdom of Bosnia ceased to exist in 1463 after its conquest by the Ottoman Empire.

There was a general awareness in medieval Bosnia, at least amongst the nobles, that they shared a joint state with Serbia and that they belonged to the same ethnic group. That awareness diminished over time, due to differences in political and social development, but it was kept in Herzegovina and parts of Bosnia which were a part of Serbian state.

=== Ottoman Empire ===
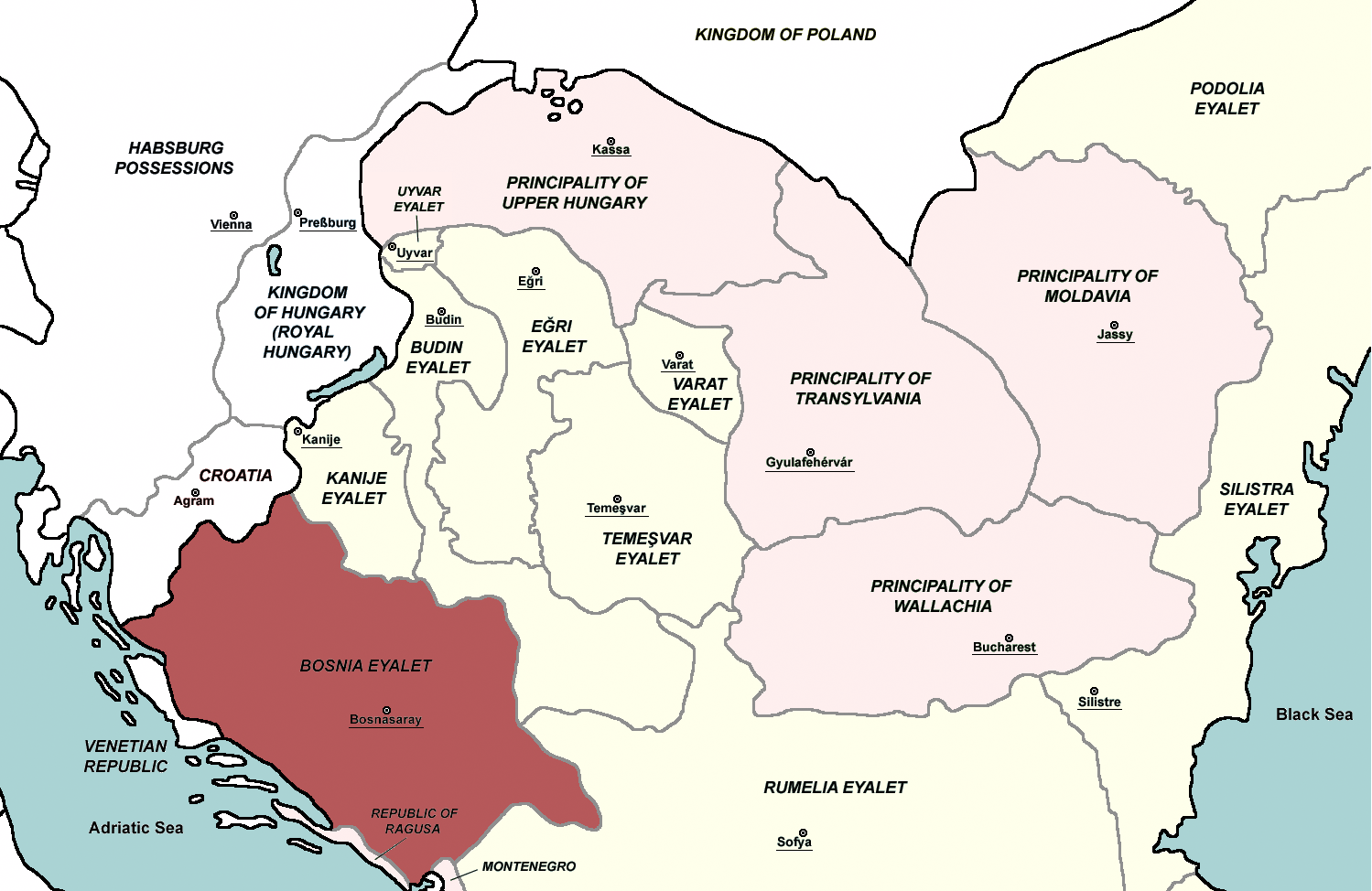
The Bosnia Eyalet in 1683

The Ottoman conquest of Bosnia marked a new era in the country's history and introduced drastic changes in the political and cultural landscape. The Ottomans incorporated Bosnia as an integral province of the Ottoman Empire with its historical name and territorial integrity. Within Bosnia, the Ottomans introduced a number of key changes in the territory's socio-political administration; including a new landholding system, a reorganization of administrative units, and a complex system of social differentiation by class and religious affiliation.

Following Ottoman annexation, there was a steady flow of people out of Bosnia and a large number of abandoned villages in Bosnia are mentioned in the Ottoman registers while those who stayed eventually became Muslims. Many Catholics in Bosnia fled to neighboring Catholic lands in the early Ottoman occupation. The evidence indicates that the early Muslim conversions in Ottoman Bosnia in the 15th–16th century were among the locals who stayed rather than mass Muslim settlements from outside Bosnia. In Herzegovina, many Orthodox people had also embraced Islam. By the late 16th and early 17th century, Muslims are considered to have become an absolute majority in Bosnia and Herzegovina. The Albanian Catholic priest Pjetër Mazreku reported in 1624 that there were 450,000 Muslims, 150,000 Catholics and 75,000 Eastern Orthodox in Bosnia and Herzegovina.

There was a lack of Orthodox Church activity in Bosnia proper in the pre-Ottoman period. An Orthodox Christian population in Bosnia was introduced as a direct result of Ottoman policy. From the 15th century and onwards, Orthodox Christians (Orthodox Vlachs and non-Vlach Orthodox Serbs) from Serbia and other regions settled in Bosnia and Herzegovina. Favored by the Ottomans over the Catholics, many Orthodox churches were allowed to be built in Bosnia by the Ottomans. Quite a few Vlachs also became Islamized in Bosnia, and some (mainly in Croatia) became Catholics.

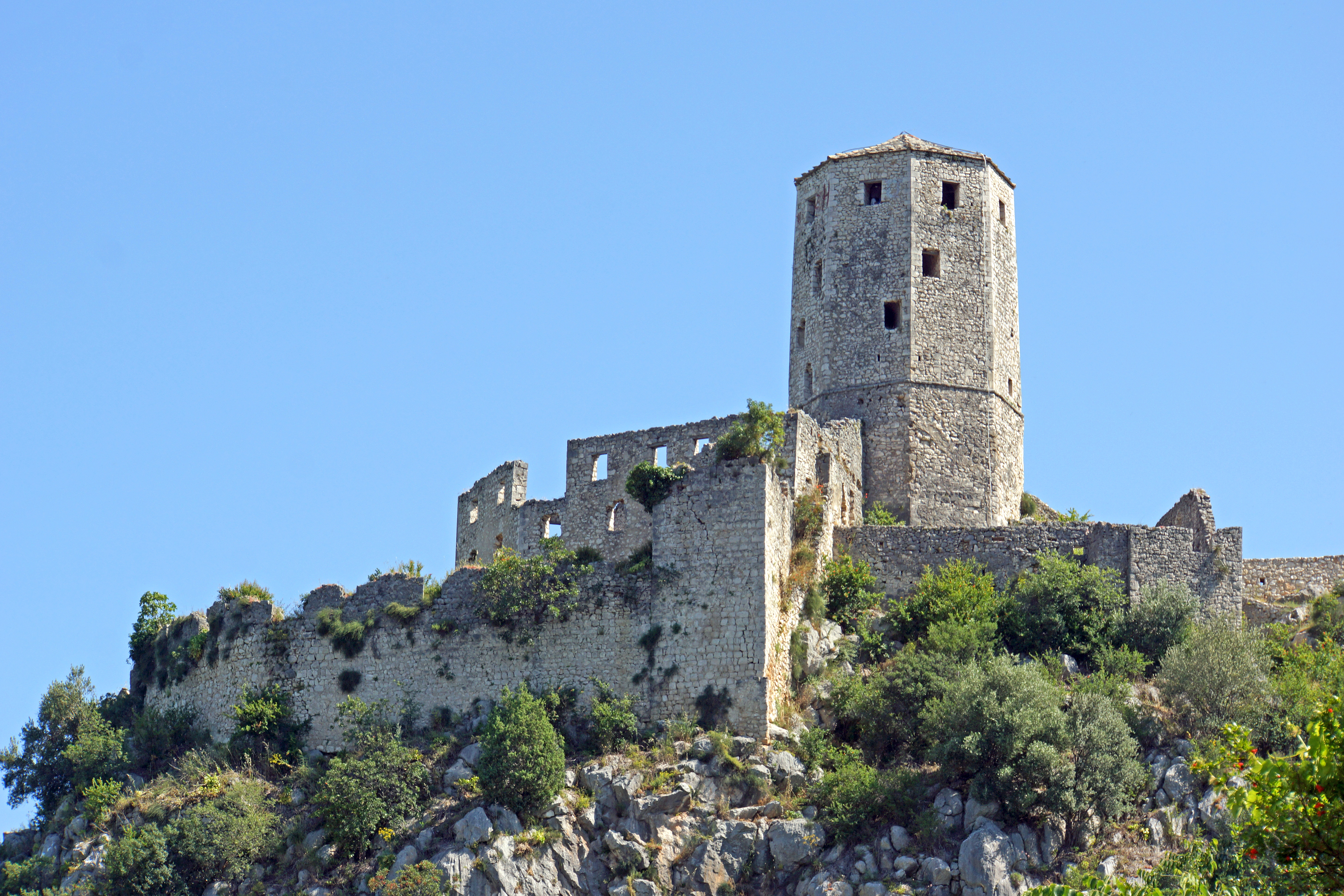
Počitelj Citadel in Čapljina, built by King Tvrtko I of Bosnia in 1383.

The four centuries of Ottoman rule also had a drastic impact on Bosnia's population make-up, which changed several times as a result of the empire's conquests, frequent wars with European powers, forced and economic migrations, and epidemics. A native Slavic-speaking Muslim community emerged and eventually became the largest of the ethno-religious groups due to a lack of strong Christian church organizations and continuous rivalry between the Orthodox and Catholic churches, while the indigenous Bosnian Church disappeared altogether (ostensibly by conversion of its members to Islam). The Ottomans referred to them as kristianlar while the Orthodox and Catholics were called gebir or kafir, meaning "unbeliever". The Bosnian Franciscans (and the Catholic population as a whole) were protected by official imperial decrees and in accordance and the full extent of Ottoman laws; however, in effect, these often merely affected arbitrary rule and behavior of powerful local elite.

As the Ottoman Empire continued its rule in the Balkans (Rumelia), Bosnia was somewhat relieved of the pressures of being a frontier province and experienced a period of general welfare. A number of cities, such as Sarajevo and Mostar, were established and grew into regional centers of trade and urban culture and were then visited by Ottoman traveler Evliya Çelebi in 1648. Within these cities, various Ottoman Sultans financed the construction of many works of Bosnian architecture such as the country's first library in Sarajevo, madrassas, a school of Sufi philosophy, and a clock tower (Sahat Kula), bridges such as the Stari Most, the Emperor's Mosque and the Gazi Husrev-beg Mosque.

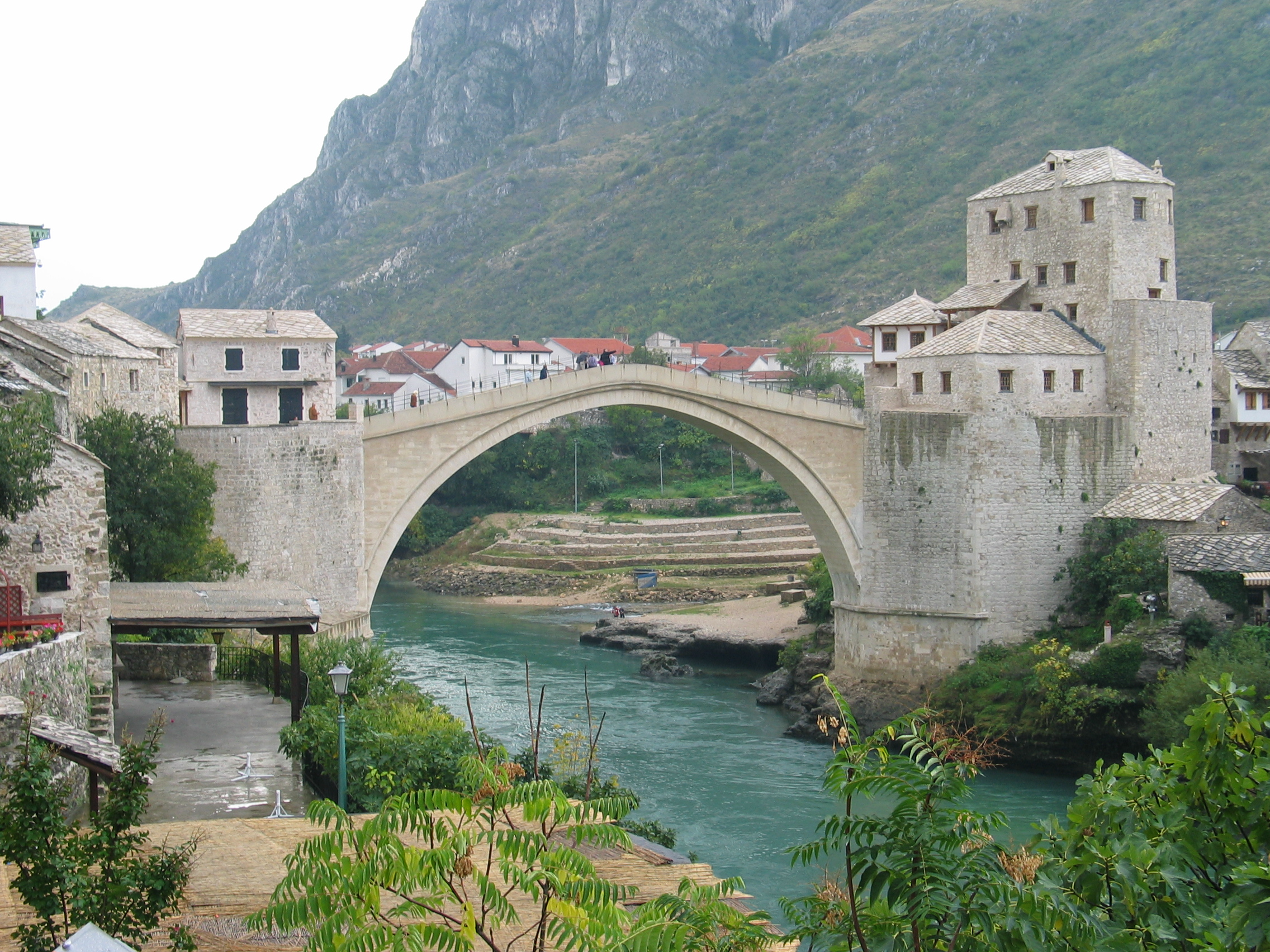
The Mostar Bridge was commissioned by Suleiman the Magnificent in 1557

Furthermore, several Bosnian Muslims played influential roles in the Ottoman Empire's cultural and political history during this time. Bosnian recruits formed a large component of the Ottoman ranks in the battles of Mohács and Krbava field, while numerous other Bosnians rose through the ranks of the Ottoman military to occupy the highest positions of power in the Empire, including admirals such as Matrakçı Nasuh; generals such as Isa-Beg Ishaković, Gazi Husrev-beg, Telli Hasan Pasha and Sarı Süleyman Pasha; administrators such as Ferhad Pasha Sokolović and Osman Gradaščević; and Grand Viziers such as the influential Sokollu Mehmed Pasha and Damat Ibrahim Pasha. Some Bosnians emerged as Sufi mystics, scholars such as Muhamed Hevaji Uskufi Bosnevi, Ali Džabić; and poets in the Turkish, Albanian, Arabic, and Persian languages.

However, by the late 17th century the Empire's military misfortunes caught up with the country, and the end of the Great Turkish War with the treaty of Karlowitz in 1699 again made Bosnia the Empire's westernmost province. The 18th century was marked by further military failures, numerous revolts within Bosnia, and several outbreaks of plague. The Porte's efforts at modernizing the Ottoman state were met with distrust growing to hostility in Bosnia, where local aristocrats stood to lose much through the proposed Tanzimat reforms. This, combined with frustrations over territorial, political concessions in the north-east, and the plight of Slavic Muslim refugees arriving from the Sanjak of Smederevo into Bosnia Eyalet, culminated in a partially unsuccessful revolt by Husein Gradaščević, who endorsed a Bosnia Eyalet autonomous from the authoritarian rule of the Ottoman Sultan Mahmud II, who persecuted, executed and abolished the Janissaries and reduced the role of autonomous Pashas in Rumelia. Mahmud II sent his Grand vizier to subdue Bosnia Eyalet and succeeded only with the reluctant assistance of Ali Pasha Rizvanbegović. Related rebellions were extinguished by 1850, but the situation continued to deteriorate.

New nationalist movements appeared in Bosnia by the middle of the 19th century. Shortly after Serbia's breakaway from the Ottoman Empire in the early 19th century, Serbian and Croatian nationalism rose up in Bosnia, and such nationalists made irredentist claims to Bosnia's territory. This trend continued to grow in the rest of the 19th and 20th centuries.

In 1867, as part of the Ottoman Empires administrative reforms, the Bosnia Eyalet was reorganized as the Vilayet of Bosnia.

Agrarian unrest eventually sparked the Herzegovinian rebellion, a widespread peasant uprising, in 1875. The conflict rapidly spread and came to involve several Balkan states and Great Powers, a situation that led to the Congress of Berlin and the Treaty of Berlin in 1878.

=== Austro-Hungarian occupation and condominium ===
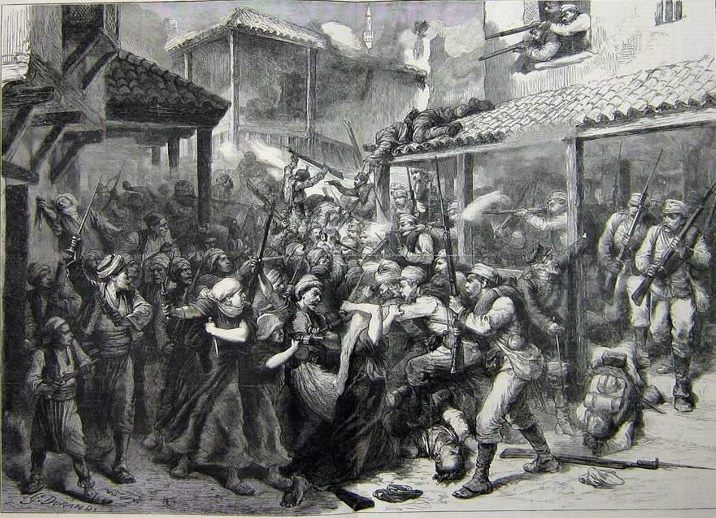
Austro-Hungarian troops enter Sarajevo, 1878

At the Congress of Berlin in 1878, the Austro-Hungarian Foreign Minister Gyula Andrássy obtained the occupation and administration of Bosnia and Herzegovina, and he also obtained the right to station garrisons in the Sanjak of Novi Pazar, which would remain under Ottoman administration until 1908, when the Austro-Hungarian troops withdrew from the Sanjak.

Although Austro-Hungarian officials quickly came to an agreement with the Bosnians, tensions remained and a mass emigration of Bosnians occurred. However, a state of relative stability was reached soon enough and Austro-Hungarian authorities were able to embark on a number of social and administrative reforms they intended would make Bosnia and Herzegovina into a "model" colony.

Habsburg rule had several key concerns in Bosnia. It tried to dissipate the South Slav nationalism by disputing the earlier Serb and Croat claims to Bosnia and encouraging identification of Bosnian or Bosniak identity. Habsburg rule also tried to provide for modernisation by codifying laws, introducing new political institutions, establishing and expanding industries.

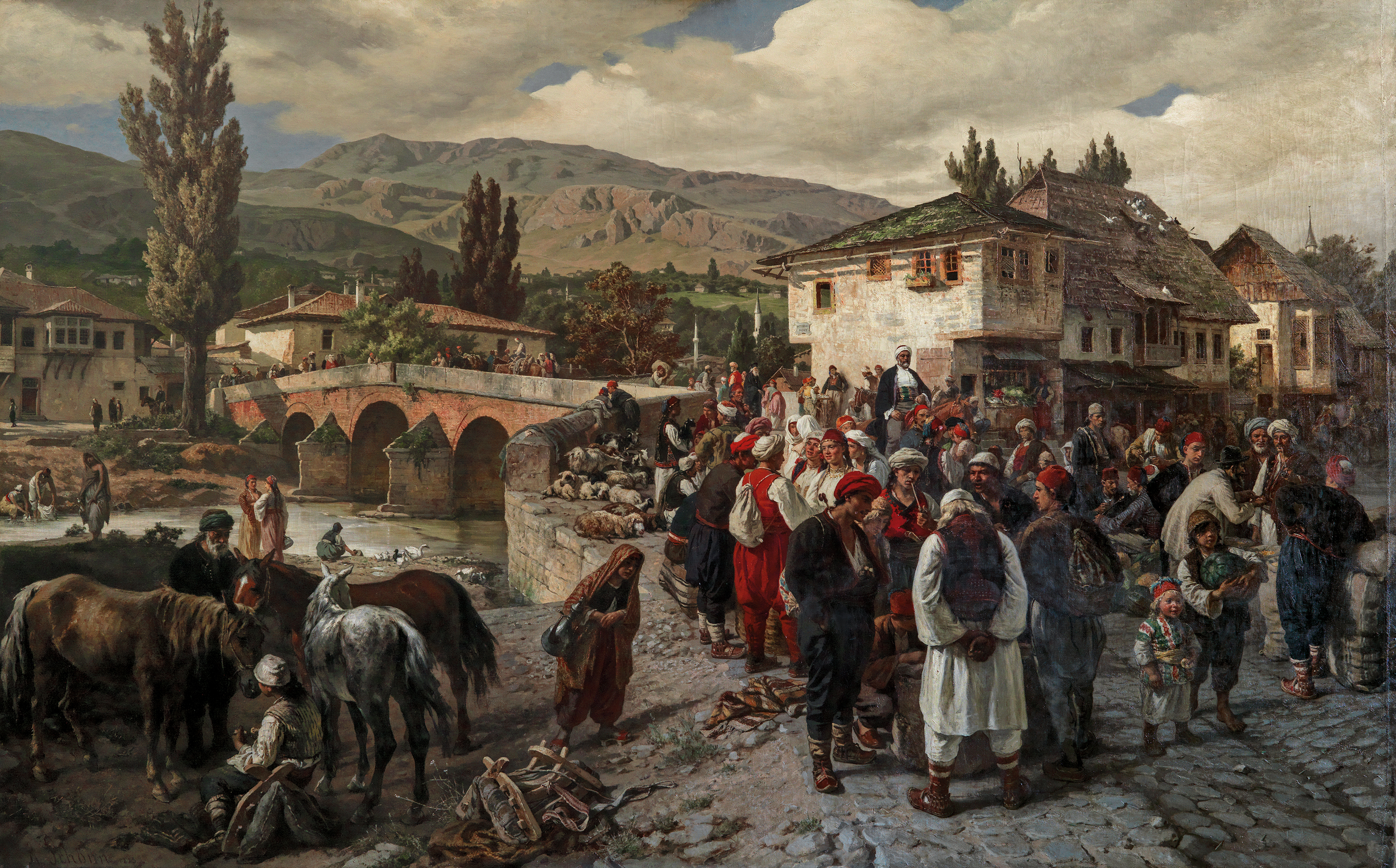
People of Sarajevo in 1883

Austria–Hungary began to plan the annexation of Bosnia, but due to international disputes the issue was not resolved until the annexation crisis of 1908. Several external matters affected the status of Bosnia and its relationship with Austria–Hungary. A bloody coup occurred in Serbia in 1903, which brought a radical anti-Austrian government into power in Belgrade. Then in 1908, the revolt in the Ottoman Empire raised concerns that the Istanbul government might seek the outright return of Bosnia and Herzegovina. These factors caused the Austro-Hungarian government to seek a permanent resolution of the Bosnian question sooner, rather than later.

Taking advantage of the turmoil in the Ottoman Empire, Austro-Hungarian diplomacy tried to obtain provisional Russian approval for changes over the status of Bosnia and Herzegovina and published the annexation proclamation on 6 October 1908. Despite international objections to the Austro-Hungarian annexation, Russians and their client state, Serbia, were compelled to accept the Austro-Hungarian annexation of Bosnia and Herzegovina in March 1909.

In 1910, Habsburg Emperor Franz Joseph proclaimed the first constitution in Bosnia, which led to relaxation of earlier laws, elections and formation of the Bosnian parliament and growth of new political life.

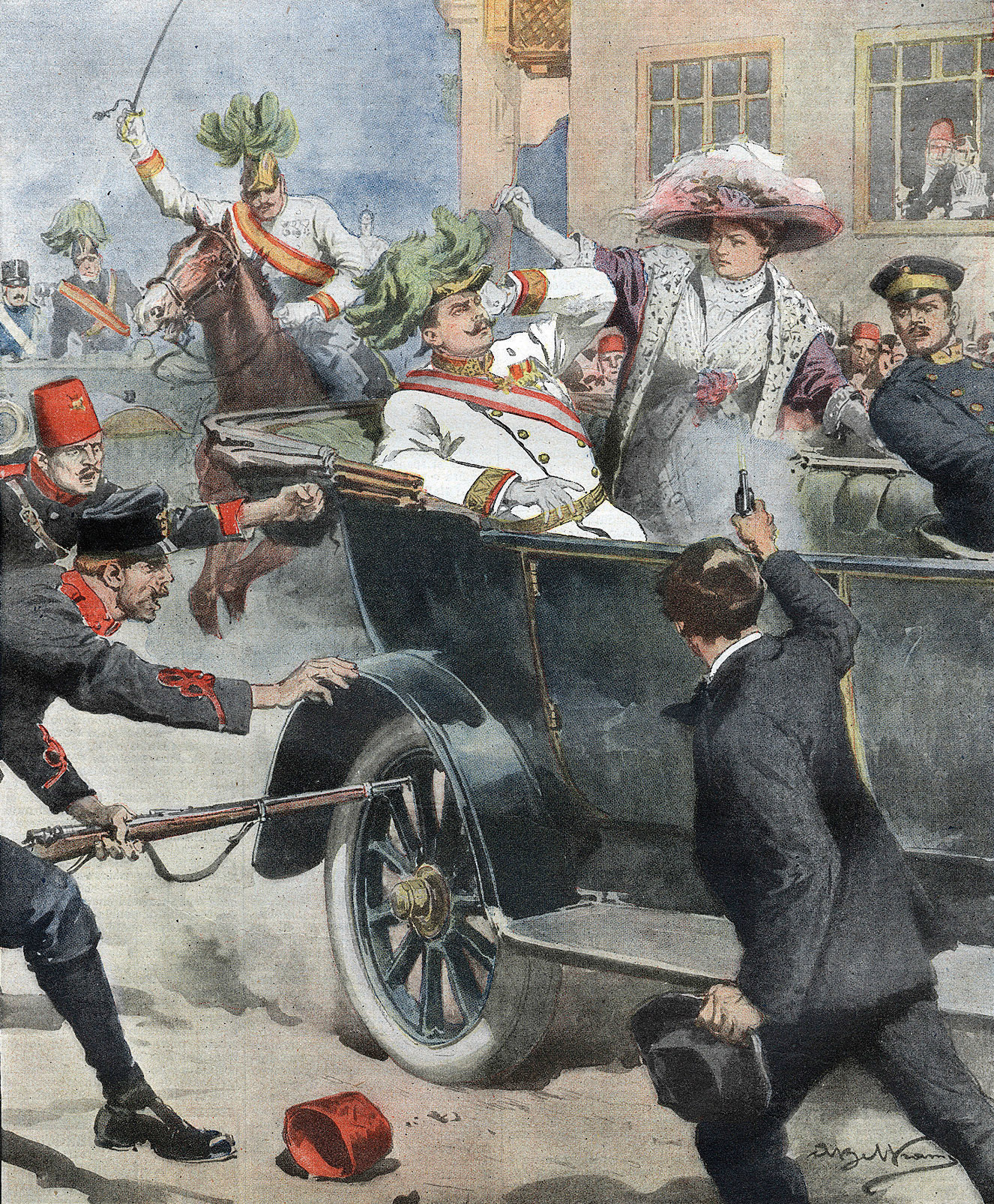
The assassination of Archduke Franz Ferdinand of Austria and Sophie, Duchess of Hohenberg by Gavrilo Princip in Sarajevo, 28 June 1914

On 28 June 1914, Gavrilo Princip, a Bosnian Serb member of the revolutionary movement Young Bosnia, assassinated the heir to the Austro-Hungarian throne, Archduke Franz Ferdinand, in Sarajevo—an event that was the spark that set off World War I. At the end of the war, the Bosnian Muslims had lost more men per capita than any other ethnic group in the Habsburg Empire whilst serving in the Bosnian-Herzegovinian Infantry of the Austro-Hungarian Army. Nonetheless, Bosnia and Herzegovina as a whole managed to escape the conflict relatively unscathed.

The Austro-Hungarian authorities established an auxiliary militia known as the Schutzkorps with a moot role in the empire's policy of anti-Serb repression. Schutzkorps, predominantly recruited among the Bosnian Muslim population, were tasked with hunting down rebel Serbs (the Chetniks and Komitadji) and became known for their persecution of Serbs particularly in Serb populated areas of eastern Bosnia, where they partly retaliated against Serbian Chetniks who in fall 1914 had carried out attacks against the Muslim population in the area. The proceedings of the Austro-Hungarian authorities led to around 5,500 citizens of Serb ethnicity in Bosnia and Herzegovina being arrested, and between 700 and 2,200 died in prison while 460 were executed. Around 5,200 Serb families were forcibly expelled from Bosnia and Herzegovina.

=== Kingdom of Yugoslavia ===
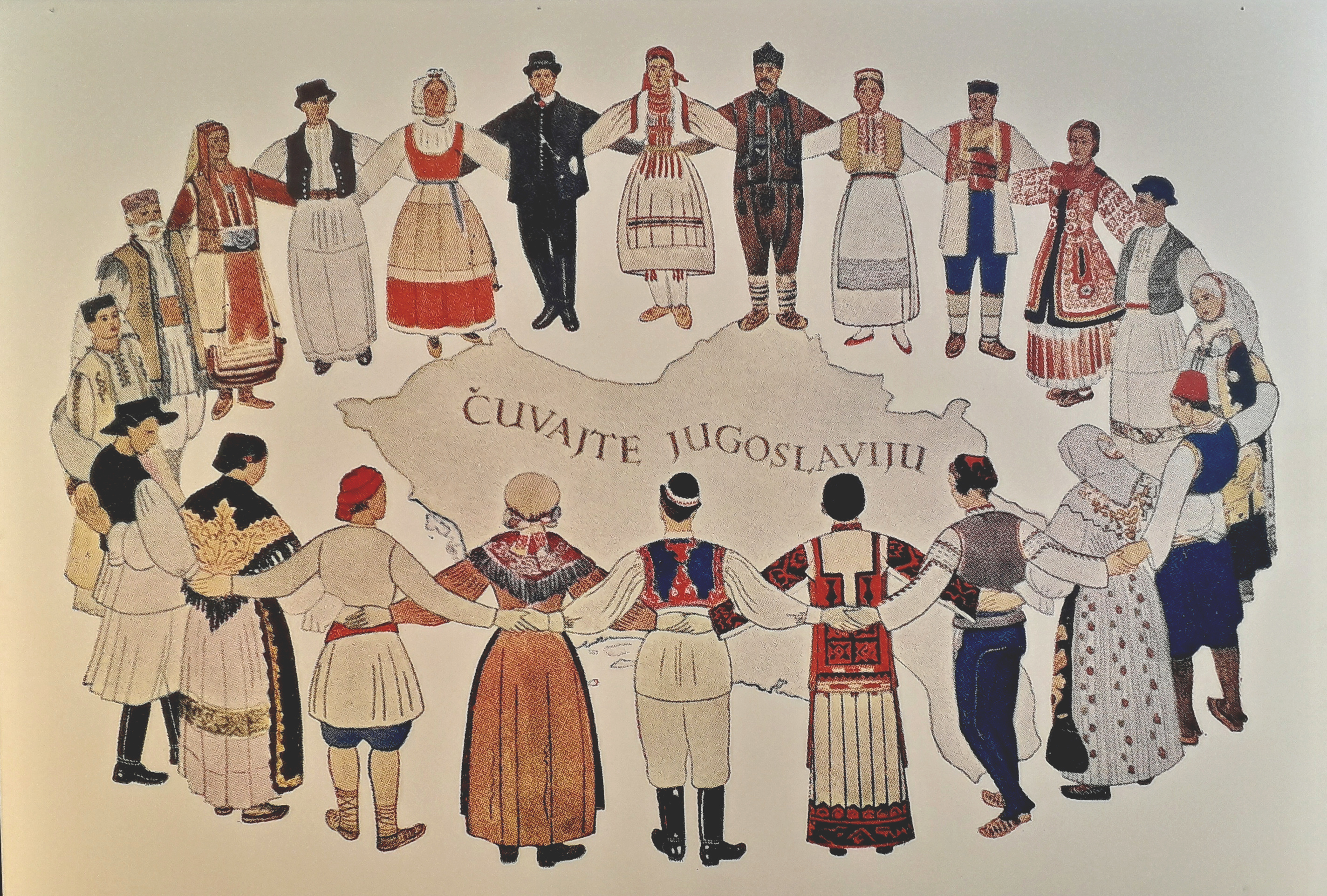
"Keep/Protect Yugoslavia" (Čuvajte Jugoslaviju), a variant of the alleged last words of King Alexander I, in an illustration of Yugoslav peoples dancing the kolo

Following World War I, Bosnia and Herzegovina became a province in the South Slav Kingdom of Serbs, Croats and Slovenes (soon renamed Yugoslavia). Political life in Bosnia and Herzegovina at this time was marked by two major trends: social and economic unrest over property redistribution and the formation of several political parties that frequently changed coalitions and alliances with parties in other Yugoslav regions.

The dominant ideological conflict of the Yugoslav state, between Croatian regionalism and Serbian centralization, was approached differently by Bosnia and Herzegovina's major ethnic groups and was dependent on the overall political atmosphere. The political reforms brought about in the newly established Yugoslav kingdom saw few benefits for the Bosnian Muslims; according to the 1910 final census of land ownership and population according to religious affiliation conducted in Austria-Hungary, Muslims owned 91.1%, Orthodox Serbs owned 6.0%, Croat Catholics owned 2.6% and others, 0.3% of the property. Following the reforms, Bosnian Muslims were dispossessed of a total of 1,175,305 hectares of agricultural and forest land. With the initial split of the country into 33 oblasts Bosnia and Herotgonvinai was dissolved as a single entity, but the efforts of Bosnian politicians, such as Mehmed Spaho, ensured the six oblasts carved up from Bosnia and Herzegovina corresponded to the six sanjaks from Ottoman times and, thus, matched the country's traditional boundary as a whole.

With the reorganization of the Kingdom of Serbs, Croats and Slovenes into the Kingdom of Yugoslavia in 1929, the redrawing of administrative regions into banates or banovinas, all of the previous Bosnian entities were dissolved and replaced by geographical names. Serbo-Croat tensions over the structuring of the Yugoslav state continued, with the concept of a separate Bosnian division receiving little or no consideration.

The Cvetković-Maček Agreement that created the Croatian banate in 1939 encouraged what was essentially a partition of Bosnia and Herzegovina between Croatia and Serbia. However the rising threat of Adolf Hitler's Nazi Germany forced Yugoslav politicians to shift their attention. Following a period that saw attempts at appeasement, the signing of the Tripartite Treaty, and a coup d'état, Yugoslavia was finally invaded by Germany on 6 April 1941.

=== World War II (1941–1945) ===
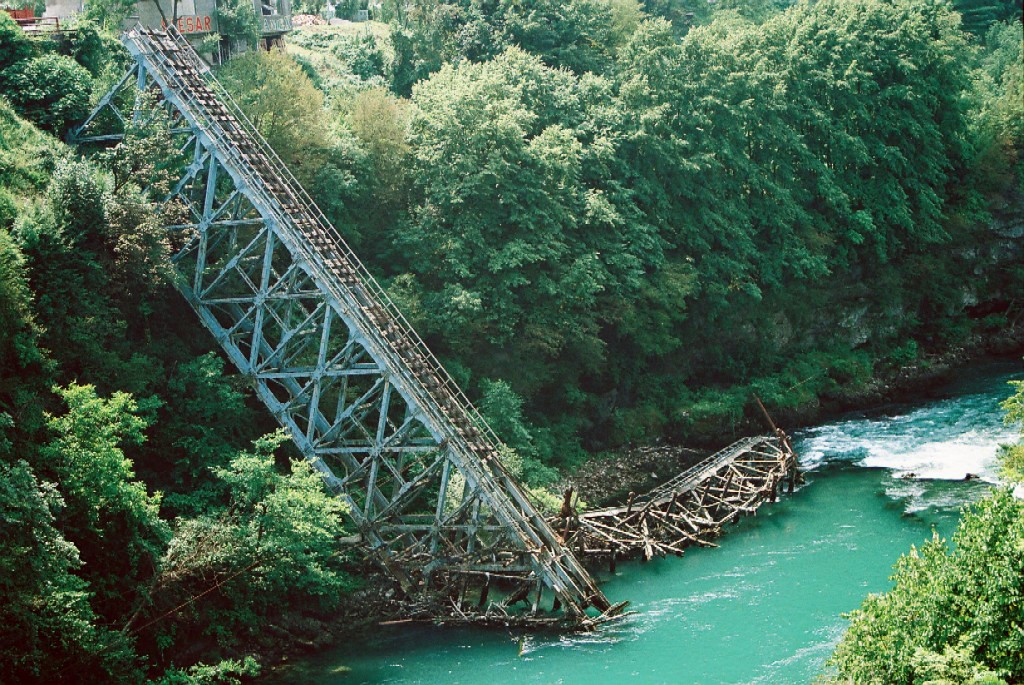
The railway bridge over the Neretva River in Jablanica, twice destroyed during the 1943 Operation Weiss offensive

Once the Kingdom of Yugoslavia was conquered and partitioned by the Axis powers in World War II, all of the region of Bosnia and Herzegovina was ceded to the Independent State of Croatia (NDH), a German and Italian puppet state led by the Ustaše. The NDH leaders embarked on a campaign of extermination of Serbs, Jews, Romani as well as dissident Croats, and, later, Josip Broz Tito's Partisans by setting up a number of death camps. The regime systematically and brutally massacred Serbs in villages in the countryside, using a variety of tools. The scale of the violence meant that approximately every sixth Serb living in Bosnia and Herzegovina was the victim of a massacre and virtually every Serb had a family member that was killed in the war, mostly by the Ustaše. The experience had a profound impact in the collective memory of Serbs in Croatia and Bosnia and Herzegovina. An estimated 209,000 Serbs or 16.9% of its Bosnia population were killed on the territory of Bosnia and Herzegovina during the war.

The Ustaše recognized both Catholicism and Islam as the national religions, but held the position Eastern Orthodox Church, as a symbol of Serb identity, was their greatest foe. Although Croats were by far the largest ethnic group to constitute the Ustaše, the Vice President of the NDH and leader of the Yugoslav Muslim Organization Džafer Kulenović was a Muslim, and Muslims in total constituted nearly 12% of the Ustaše military and civil service authority.

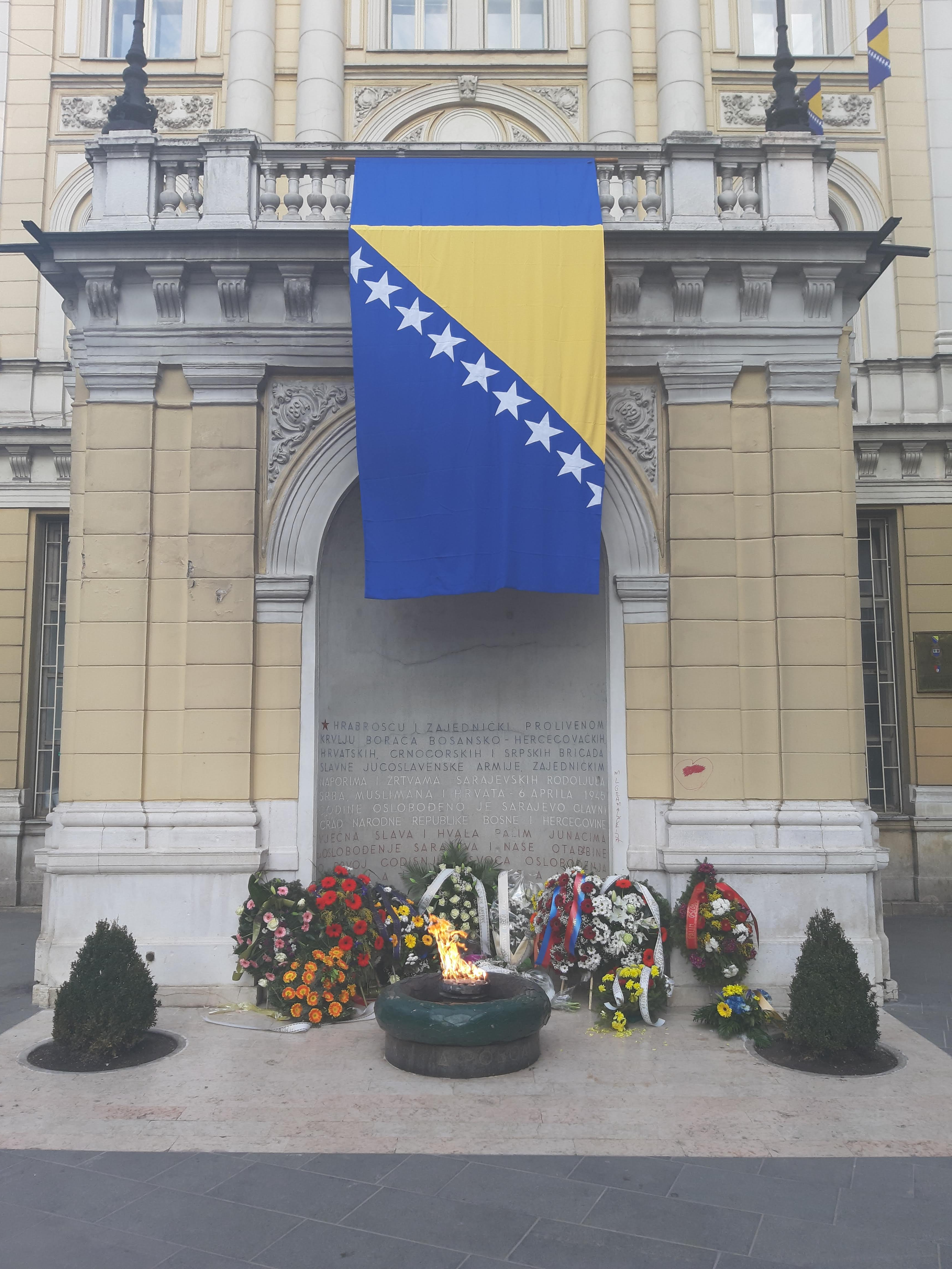
Eternal flame memorial to military and civilian World War II victims in Sarajevo

Many Serbs themselves took up arms and joined the Chetniks, a Serb nationalist movement with the aim of establishing an ethnically homogeneous 'Greater Serbian' state within the Kingdom of Yugoslavia. The Chetniks, in turn, pursued a genocidal campaign against ethnic Muslims and Croats, as well as persecuting a large number of communist Serbs and other Communist sympathizers, with the Muslim populations of Bosnia, Herzegovina and Sandžak being a primary target. Once captured, Muslim villagers were systematically massacred by the Chetniks. Of the 75,000 Muslims who died in Bosnia and Herzegovina during the war, approximately 30,000 (mostly civilians) were killed by the Chetniks. Massacres against Croats were smaller in scale but similar in action. Between 64,000 and 79,000 Bosnian Croats were killed between April 1941 to May 1945. Of these, about 18,000 were killed by the Chetniks.

A percentage of Muslims served in Nazi Waffen-SS units. These units were responsible for massacres of Serbs in northwest and eastern Bosnia, most notably in Vlasenica. On 12 October 1941, a group of 108 prominent Sarajevan Muslims signed the Resolution of Sarajevo Muslims by which they condemned the persecution of Serbs organized by the Ustaše, made distinction between Muslims who participated in such persecutions and the Muslim population as a whole, presented information about the persecutions of Muslims by Serbs, and requested security for all citizens of the country, regardless of their identity.

Starting in 1941, Yugoslav communists under the leadership of Josip Broz Tito organized their own multi-ethnic resistance group, the Partisans, who fought against both Axis and Chetnik forces. On 29 November 1943, the Anti-Fascist Council for the National Liberation of Yugoslavia (AVNOJ) with Tito at its helm held a founding conference in Jajce where Bosnia and Herzegovina was reestablished as a republic within the Yugoslav federation in its Habsburg borders. During the entire course of World War II in Yugoslavia, 64.1% of all Bosnian Partisans were Serbs, 23% were Muslims and 8.8% Croats.

Military success eventually prompted the Allies to support the Partisans, resulting in the successful Maclean Mission, but Tito declined their offer to help and relied on his own forces instead. All the major military offensives by the antifascist movement of Yugoslavia against Nazis and their local supporters were conducted in Bosnia and Herzegovina and its peoples bore the brunt of the fighting. More than 300,000 people died in Bosnia and Herzegovina in World War II, or more than 10% of the population. At the end of the war, the establishment of the Socialist Federal Republic of Yugoslavia, with the constitution of 1946, officially made Bosnia and Herzegovina one of six constituent republics in the new state.

=== Socialist Yugoslavia (1945–1992) ===
Bosnia and Herzegovina's flag while part of the Socialist Federal Republic of Yugoslavia

Due to its central geographic position within the Yugoslav federation, post-war Bosnia was selected as a base for the development of the military defense industry. This contributed to a large concentration of arms and military personnel in Bosnia; a significant factor in the war that followed the break-up of Yugoslavia in the 1990s. However, Bosnia's existence within Yugoslavia, for the large part, was relatively peaceful and very prosperous, with high employment, a strong industrial and export oriented economy, a good education system and social and medical security for every citizen of Bosnia and Herzegovina. Several international corporations operated in Bosnia—Volkswagen as part of TAS (car factory in Sarajevo, from 1972), Coca-Cola (from 1975), SKF Sweden (from 1967), Marlboro (a tobacco factory in Sarajevo), and Holiday Inn hotels. Sarajevo was the site of the 1984 Winter Olympics.

During the 1950s and 1960s, Bosnia was a political backwater of Yugoslavia. In the 1970s, a strong Bosnian political elite arose, fueled in part by Tito's leadership in the Non-Aligned Movement and Bosnians serving in Yugoslavia's diplomatic corps. While working within the Socialist system, politicians such as Džemal Bijedić, Branko Mikulić and Hamdija Pozderac reinforced and protected the sovereignty of Bosnia and Herzegovina. Their efforts proved key during the turbulent period following Tito's death in 1980, and are today considered some of the early steps towards Bosnian independence. However, the republic did not escape the increasingly nationalistic climate of the time. With the fall of communism and the start of the breakup of Yugoslavia, doctrine of tolerance began to lose its potency, creating an opportunity for nationalist elements in the society to spread their influence.

=== Bosnian War ===
Following Slovenia and Croatia's declarations of independence from Yugoslavia, a significant split developed among the residents of Bosnia and Herzegovina on the issue of whether to remain within Yugoslavia (overwhelmingly favored by Serbs) or seek independence (overwhelmingly favored by Muslims and Croats). The Serb members of parliament, consisting mainly of the Serb Democratic Party members, abandoned the central parliament in Sarajevo, and formed the Assembly of the Serb People of Bosnia and Herzegovina on 24 October 1991, which marked the end of the three-ethnic coalition that governed after the elections in 1990. This Assembly established the Serbian Republic of Bosnia and Herzegovina in part of the territory of Bosnia and Herzegovina on 9 January 1992. It was renamed Republika Srpska in August 1992. On 18 November 1991, the party branch in Bosnia and Herzegovina of the ruling party in the Republic of Croatia, the Croatian Democratic Union (HDZ), proclaimed the existence of the Croatian Community of Herzeg-Bosnia in a separate part of the territory of Bosnia and Herzegovina with the Croatian Defence Council (HVO) as its military branch.

From 29 February to 2 March 1992, Bosnia and Herzegovina held a referendum on independence that was boycotted by Bosnian Serbs, in which 99.7% voted in favor. Yugoslavia effected an economic blockade of Bosnia and Herzegovina, thus trying to keep it as part of Yugoslavia. Later, Yugoslavia claimed territory of Bosnia and Herzegovina with a Serb majority and the capital Sarajevo. The objective of Serbian politics in Bosnia and Herzegovina was to unite Serbian autonomous provinces into a single unit that would join Yugoslavia, and with total blockade of Sarajevo, break Bosnia and Herzegovina into smaller, unconnected and hardly defensible enclaves. Because of superiority in armaments, support from Belgrade and an embargo on the importation of arms into Bosnia and Herzegovina, the Serbs achieved their goals by June 1992.

The Bosniak leadership was still indecisive concerning a major conflict, so the Croats were the first to participate in the war. They organized military units, Croatian Defence Forces (HOS) in November 1991 and the Croatian Defence Council in April 1992. Those units were partly composed of Bosniaks. The Territorial Defence of Bosnia and Herzegovina, later Army of the Republic of Bosnia and Herzegovina effectively organized in autumn of 1992. In Serb-controlled areas, Serbs performed mass murders, ethnic cleansing of non-Serbs, primarily Bosniaks and Croats, established concentration camps and destroyed Bosniak and Croat cultural inheritance. By November 1992, Bosnian Serb forces had conquered about 70% of the territory of Bosnia and Herzegovina and held Sarajevo in limbo by keeping it under siege.

The creation of a Croatian Republic of Herzeg-Bosnia was a matter of dispute for Bosniaks. Croats accused Bosniaks of Islamization of the country and attempts to create Bosniak domination in all areas. So they withdrew the ethnic Croat representatives from Parliament, Government and the Presidency. Due to expulsions by Bosnian Serbs, Bosniaks moved to other areas and thus disrupted the Croats' area and altered their pre-war ratio. Political disputes and minor incidents in central and northern Bosnia and in northern and central Herzegovina led to Croat-Bosniak War in November 1992.

The Vance-Owen plan was presented in January 1993. It was planned to create 10 cantons on the territory of the whole of Bosnia and Herzegovina. This plan increased conflict between Croats and Bosniaks. The Army of the Republic of Bosnia and Herzegovina (ARBiH) launched four offensives and conquered a large area which was under control of HVO; almost the whole Central Bosnia (except Novi Travnik, Vitez, Busovača, Kiseljak, Kreševo and Žepče and the wider areas around those towns and Usora, part of Municipality of Travnik, Zavidovići and part of Municipality of Vareš) and part of Herzegovina, Konjic, Jablanica and eastern and northern parts of Mostar.

Crimes against civilians were committed on both sides. Hostility between Croats and Bosniaks ended with mediation by the United States and the signing of the Washington Agreement on 18 March 1994. The cooperation between Croats and Bosniaks was renewed, and the Federation of Bosnia and Herzegovina, a Bosniak and Croat controlled area was established. There was also a proposal to create a confederation of Federation of Bosnia and Herzegovina and Republic of Croatia. The joint command of ARBiH, HVO and Croatian Army (HV) was established in March 1995. The closer cooperation between Croats and Bosniaks was made through the Split Agreement where Bosnia and Herzegovina's Bosniak leaders allowed the Croatian Army to free western part of Bosnia and Herzegovina with cooperation with ARBiH. After the Operation Storm, the Serbian hoop around Bihać was broken and Croatian and Bosnian armies continued to liberate western Bosnia. The UN unsuccessfully tried to establish peace in Bosnia and Herzegovina by trying to create a successful structure for Bosnia and Herzegovina. Serbs launched an attack on the UN-protected town of Bihać, but they were stopped by the Croatian army during Operation Storm. Joint Croatian-Bosnian military successes made peace negotiations possible.

=== Creation ===
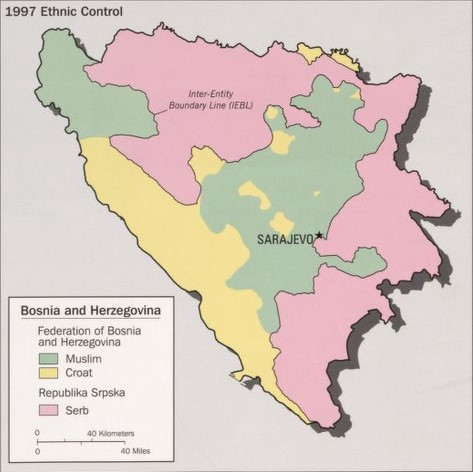
Bosnia and Herzegovina in 1997 Bosniak-majority areas Croat-controlled areas in 1997

Flag of the Federation from 1996 to 2007

Coat of arms of the Federation from 1996 to 2007

The basis for the creation of the Federation of Bosnia and Herzegovina was laid down by the Washington Agreement of March 1994. Under the agreement, the combined territory held by the Army of the Republic of Bosnia and Herzegovina and the Croatian Defence Council forces was to be divided into ten autonomous cantons along the lines of the Vance–Owen plan. The cantonal system was selected to prevent dominance of one ethnic group over another. However, much of the territory Croats and Bosniaks claimed for their Federation was at that point still controlled by the Bosnian Serbs.

The Washington Agreement was implemented during the spring of 1994, by convoking a Constitutional Assembly, which on 24 June adopted and proclaimed the Constitution of the Federation of Bosnia and Herzegovina. In 1995, Bosniak forces and Bosnian Croat forces of the Federation of Bosnia and Herzegovina defeated forces of the Autonomous Province of Western Bosnia, and this territory was added to the federation (Una-Sana Canton).

=== Post-war ===
Federation of Bosnia and Herzegovina (1995–1999) – OHR.int

By the Dayton Agreement of 1995 that ended the four-year war, the Federation of Bosnia and Herzegovina was defined as one of the two entities of Bosnia and Herzegovina, comprising 51% of country's area, alongside Republika Srpska. Cantons and federal structure were built rather slowly after the war. Separatist Croat Herzeg-Bosnia institutions existed and functioned parallel to Federation ones up until 1996–1997, when they were phased out. On 8 March 2000, the Brčko District was formed as an autonomous district within Bosnia and Herzegovina and it was created from part of the territory of both Bosnian entities. Brčko District is now a condominium that belongs to both entities.

In 2001–2002, the Office of the High Representative (OHR) imposed amendments to the Federation's Constitution and its electoral law, in compliance with the decisions of the Constitutional Court of Bosnia and Herzegovina on the political equality of the three constituent peoples (U-5/98). This triggered the grievances of Bosnian Croats, who claimed they were deprived of their rights to representation as Bosniaks had come to control the majority in the upper house as well. Dissatisfied Croat politicians set up a separate Croatian National Assembly, held a referendum parallel to the elections and proclaimed their self-rule in Croat-majority areas in the Federation. Their attempts ended shortly after a crackdown by SFOR and legal proceedings.

Dissatisfied with the representation of Croats in the Federation, Croat political parties insist on creating a Croat-majority federal unit instead of several cantons. SDA and other Bosniak parties strongly oppose this. In September 2010, the International Crisis Group warned that "disputes among and between Bosniak and Croat leaders and a dysfunctional administrative system have paralyzed decision-making, put the entity on the verge of bankruptcy and triggered social unrest".

In 2010–2014 the Federation's Government was formed by SDP without the consent of major Croat political parties, leading to a political crisis. In parallel to EU-facilitated talks on the Sejdic-Finci issue at State level, in February 2013 the US embassy supported an expert working group which presented its 188 recommendations to the FBiH House of Representatives in 2013, aiming to address the costly and complex governance structures with overlapping competences between the Federation, the Cantons and the municipalities as currently entailed in the Federation Constitution. The initiative was finally not adopted by the Parliament.

Following an appeal by HDZ BiH Božo Ljubić, in December 2016 the Constitutional Court of Bosnia and Herzegovina abolished the electoral formula for the indirect election of the Federation House of People, stating that it did not guarantee the legitimate representation of constituent peoples. Notably, the ruling did not concur with an amicus curiae opinion of the Venice Commission on the same matter. Lacking legislative amendments to revise the Election Law, in Summer 2018 the Central Election Commission of Bosnia and Herzegovina provisionally enacted a new formula for the composition of the House of People, based on the minimal representation formula (one deputy per each constituent people per each canton) and on the 2013 census.

In January 2017, Croatian National Assembly stated that "if Bosnia and Herzegovina wants to become self-sustainable, then it is necessary to have an administrative-territorial reorganization, which would include a federal unit with a Croatian majority. It remains the permanent aspiration of the Croatian people of Bosnia and Herzegovina."

In 2022, the High Representative imposed amendments to the federal Constitution and the Election Law, implementing the Ljubic verdict. The changes also reconstructed the original balance of power between Croats and Bosniaks in the Federation, as envisioned in Washington Agreement. In 2023, the High Representative suspended the federal Constitution for one day in order to impose a new government. This created a huge scandal and political crisis. Some saw this as an act of "treason".

== Geographic boundary ==
The Inter-Entity Boundary Line (IEBL) that distinguishes Bosnia and Herzegovina's two entities runs along the frontlines as they existed at the end of the Bosnian War, with adjustments (most importantly in the western part of the country and around Sarajevo), as defined by the Dayton Agreement. The total length of the IEBL is approximately 1,080 km. The IEBL is an administrative demarcation and not controlled by the military or police and there is free movement across it.

Five of the cantons (Una-Sana, Tuzla, Zenica-Doboj, Bosnian Podrinje and Sarajevo) are Bosniak-majority cantons, three (Posavina, West Herzegovina and Canton 10) are Croat-majority cantons, and two (Central Bosnia and Herzegovina-Neretva) are 'ethnically mixed', meaning there are special legislative procedures for protection of the constituent peoples. A significant portion of Brčko District was also part of the Federation; however, when the district was created, it became shared territory of both entities, but it was not placed under control of either of the two, and is hence under direct jurisdiction of Bosnia and Herzegovina. Currently the Federation of Bosnia and Herzegovina has 79 municipalities.

== Politics ==
The government and politics of the Federation are dominated by three large parties, the Bosniak Party of Democratic Action (SDA), the multi-ethnic Social Democratic Party (SDP BiH) and the Croatian Democratic Union (HDZ BiH).

Institutions include:

- Federal President with two vice-presidents (list of presidents of FBiH)
- Federal Government with guaranteed ethnic representation (list of prime ministers of FBiH)
- Bicameral Parliament:
  - House of Representatives as the lower house and
  - House of Peoples as the upper house, protecting the interests of the three constituent peoples;
- Federal Constitutional Court.

Since Bosniaks compose roughly 70.4% of the Federation's population, Croats 22.4% and Serbs just around 2%, the Parliament's House of Peoples (with equal representation for all three nationalities) is supposed to ensure that the interests of Croats, Serbs and national minorities are fairly represented during government creation and in the legislative process. The Federation is also divided into ten highly autonomous cantons. They each have their own governments, assemblies and exclusive and shared competencies. In 2010, the Federation's Constitutional Court ruled that two Federation's ministries – the Ministry of Education and Science and the Ministry of Culture and Sports – are unconstitutional since education and culture are an exclusive competence of the cantons.

=== Political divisions ===

The Federation of Bosnia and Herzegovina comprises ten cantons (Bosnian: kantoni, Croatian: županije):

No.	Canton	Center	No.	Canton	Center
1	Una-Sana	Bihać	6	Central Bosnia	Travnik
2	Posavina	Orašje	7	Herzegovina-Neretva	Mostar
3	Tuzla	Tuzla	8	West Herzegovina	Široki Brijeg
4	Zenica-Doboj	Zenica	9	Sarajevo	Sarajevo
5	Bosnian-Podrinje	Goražde	10	Canton 10	Livno

== Demographics ==
The Federation of Bosnia and Herzegovina comprises 51% of the land area of Bosnia and Herzegovina, and is home to 62.85% of the country's total population.

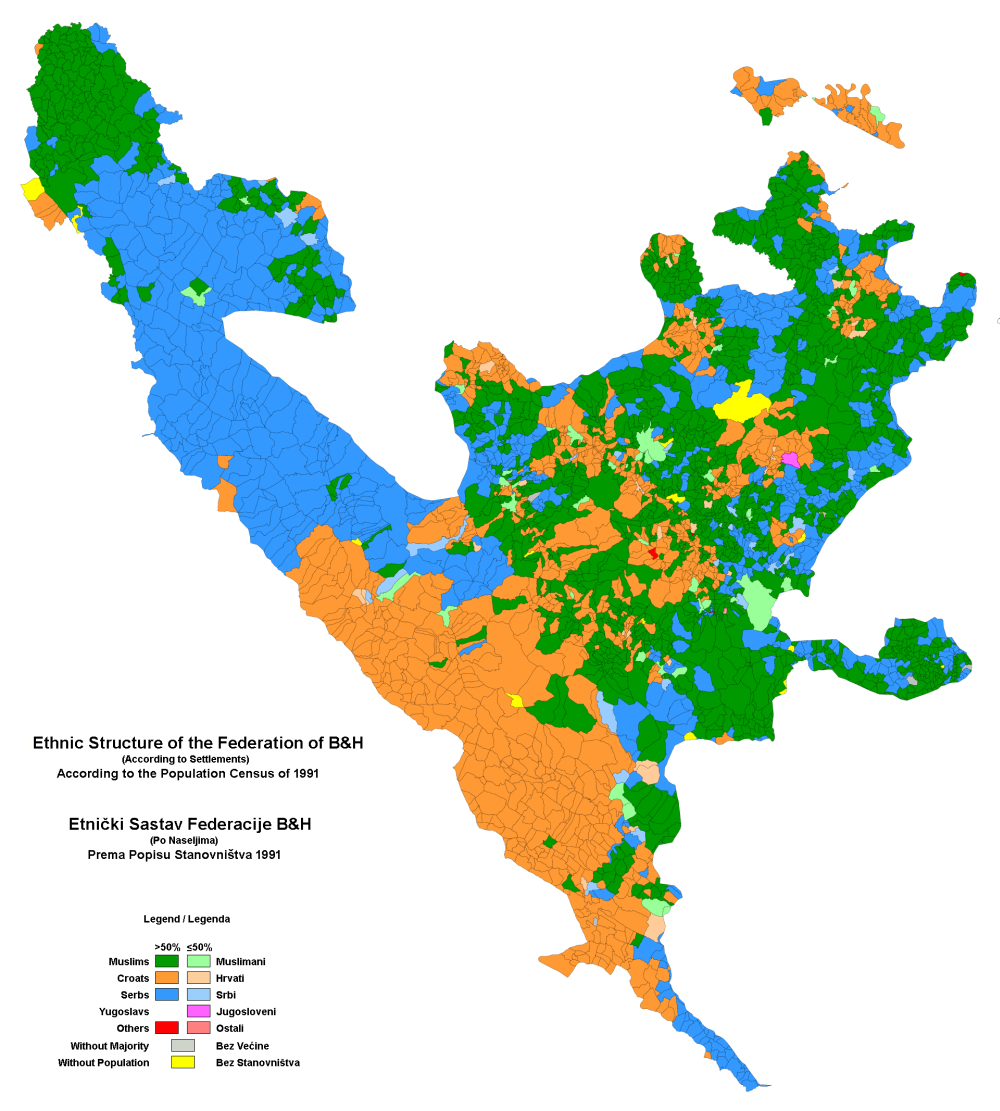
Ethnic composition in 1991 (pre-war)

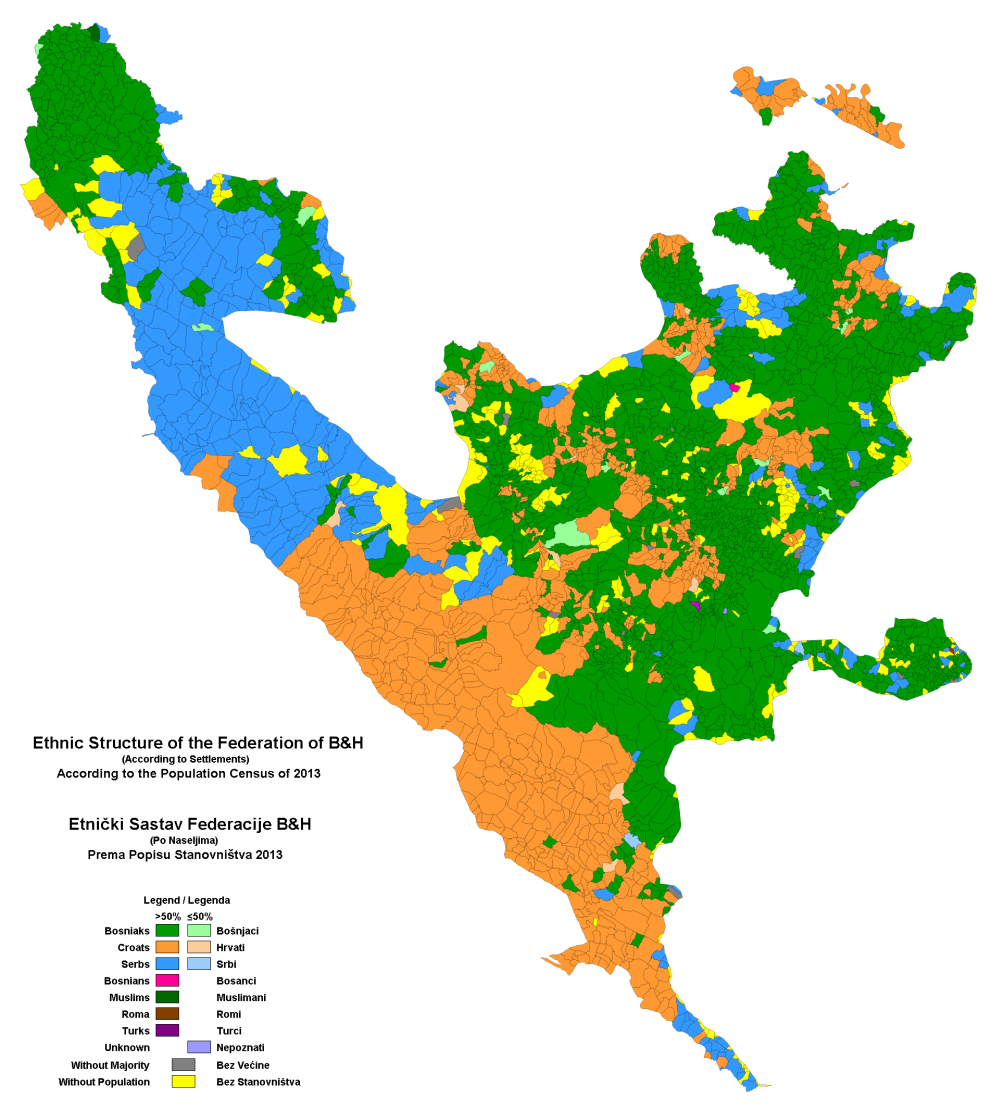
Ethnic composition in 2013

Population of the Federation of Bosnia and Herzegovina according to ethnic group 1991–2013
Ethnic group	census 1991		census 2013	
Ethnic group	Number	%	Number	%
Muslims/Bosniaks	1,423,593	52.34%	1,562,372	70.40%
Croats	594,362	21.85%	497,883	22.44%
Serbs	478,122	17.58%	56,550	2.55%
Yugoslavs	161,938	5.95%		
Others	62,059	2.28%	102,415	4.61%
Total	2,720,074		2,219,220	

Largest cities or towns in the Federation of Bosnia and Herzegovina 2013 Census
Rank		Canton	Pop.	Rank		Canton	Pop.
1	Sarajevo	Sarajevo Canton	275,524	11	Lukavac	Tuzla Canton	44,520
2	Tuzla	Tuzla Canton	110,979	12	Tešanj	Zenica-Doboj Canton	43,063
3	Zenica	Zenica-Doboj Canton	110,663	13	Gradačac	Tuzla Canton	41,836
4	Mostar	Herzegovina-Neretva Canton	105,797	14	Sanski Most	Una-Sana Canton	41,475
5	Ilidža	Sarajevo Canton	71,892	15	Visoko	Zenica-Doboj Canton	41,352
6	Cazin	Una-Sana Canton	66,149	16	Velika Kladuša	Una-Sana Canton	40,419
7	Živinice	Tuzla Canton	57,765	17	Zavidovići	Zenica-Doboj Canton	40,272
8	Bihać	Una-Sana Canton	56,261	18	Srebrenik	Tuzla Canton	39,678
9	Travnik	Central Bosnia Canton	53,482	19	Kakanj	Zenica-Doboj Canton	38,937
10	Gračanica	Tuzla Canton	48,395	20	Livno	Canton 10	37,487

== See also ==
- Political divisions of Bosnia and Herzegovina
- History of Bosnia and Herzegovina
- Proposed Croat federal unit in Bosnia and Herzegovina

== Sources ==
- Albertini, Luigi (2005). Jochen Thies (ed.). The Origins of the War of 1914. Enigma Books. ISBN 978-1-929631-26-1. Archived from the original on 6 January 2017.
- Basic, Denis (2009). "4.1.1. Early Medieval Bosnia in Porphyrogenitus' De Administrando Imperio". The Roots of the Religious, Ethnic, and National Identity of the Bosnian-Herzegovinian Muslims. University of Washington. ISBN 9781109124637. Archived from the original on 28 June 2014.
- Bejko, Lorenc; Morris, Sarah; Papadopoulos, John; Schepartz, Lynne (2015). The Excavation of the Prehistoric Burial Tumulus at Lofkend, Albania. ISD LLC. ISBN 978-1938770524.
- Dausse, Marie-Pierre (2015). Souchon, Cécile (ed.). "La Grèce du Nord aux IVe et IIIe siècles avant J.-C. : des États puissants aux frontières floues?". Actes des congrès nationaux des sociétés historiques et scientifiques: 24–31. doi:10.4000/books.cths.2013. Archived from the original on 7 February 2023.
- Fine, John Van Antwerp Jr. (1991). The Early Medieval Balkans: A Critical Survey from the Sixth to the Late Twelfth Century. University of Michigan Press. ISBN 978-0-472-08149-3. Archived from the original on 4 April 2019.
- Hammond, N. G. L.; Wilkes, J. J. (2012). "Illyrii". In Hornblower, Simon; Spawforth, Antony; Eidinow, Esther (eds.). The Oxford Classical Dictionary. OUP Oxford. p. 726. ISBN 978-0-19-954556-8.
- Human Rights Watch (1999). War Crimes in Bosnia-Hercegovina. Human Rights Watch. ISBN 1-56432-083-9.
- Malcolm, Noel (2002). Bosnia: A Short History. Pan Books. ISBN 978-0-330-41244-5. Archived from the original on 6 January 2017.
- Shpuza, Saimir (2022). "D'un limên à une polis. Orikos aux périodes archaïque et classique". In Brancato, Rodolfo (ed.). Schemata: la città oltre la forma : per una nuova definizione dei paesaggi urbani e delle loro funzioni: urbanizzazione e società nel Mediterraneo pre-classico : età arcaica. Edizioni Quasar. ISBN 9788854912755.
- Tomasevich, Jozo (2001). War and Revolution in Yugoslavia: 1941–1945. Stanford University Press. ISBN 978-0-8047-7924-1. Archived from the original on 4 January 2014.
- Velikonja, Mitja (2003). Religious Separation and Political Intolerance in Bosnia–Herzegovina. Texas A&M University Press. ISBN 978-1-58544-226-3. Archived from the original on 30 April 2016.
- Zindel, Christian; Lippert, Andreas; Lahi, Bashkim; Kiel, Machiel (2018). Albanien: Ein Archäologie- und Kunstführer von der Steinzeit bis ins 19. Jahrhundert (in German). Vandenhoeck & Ruprecht. ISBN 9783205200109.
