= President of the Federation of Bosnia and Herzegovina =

Political position in Bosnia and Herzegovina

- Predsjednik Federacije Bosne i Hercegovine
- Incumbent; Lidija Bradara since 28 February 2023
- Nominator: House of Peoples of the Federation of Bosnia and Herzegovina
- Appointer: Parliament of the Federation of Bosnia and Herzegovina
- Term length: 4 years, renewable once
- Formation: 31 May 1994; 32 years ago
- Deputy: Vice-President of the Federation of Bosnia and Herzegovina
- Salary: 3210 BAM (€ 1635)
- Website: http://predsjednikfbih.gov.ba/

The president of the Federation of Bosnia and Herzegovina represents the Federation and is the head of the federal executive power. The term of the federal president is four years. The post was established in March 1994.

The election of the federal president consists of several activities. In electing the president and two vice-presidents of the Federation, at least one-third of the delegates of the respective Bosniak, Croat or Serb caucuses in the House of Peoples may nominate the president, and two vice-presidents of the Federation. After that, the House of Representatives needs to approve the president and vice-presidents, and after that, the House of Peoples has to confirm the decision of the House of Representatives by the majority of votes of all three caucuses.

The president can be dismissed from office after Federal Constitutional Court approves the request from the Parliament of the Federation of Bosnia and Herzegovina. Before the request was sent, two-thirds of Parliament need to vote for it.

== See also ==
- Presidency of Bosnia and Herzegovina
- President of Republika Srpska
