= 11th electoral unit of the House of Representatives of the Federation of Bosnia and Herzegovina =

Parliamentary constituency

11th electoral unit
- House of Representatives of the Federation of Bosnia and Herzegovina constituency
- Electoral unit within the Federation of Bosnia and Herzegovina

Current constituency
- Created: 2000
- Seats: 10 (2000-2002); 7 (2002-present)

The eleventh electoral unit of the Federation of Bosnia and Herzegovina is a parliamentary constituency used to elect members to the House of Representatives of the Federation of Bosnia and Herzegovina since 2000. Located within Sarajevo Canton, it consists of the municipalities of Centar, Ilijaš, Novo Sarajevo, Stari Grad, and Vogošća.

== Demographics ==
Ethnicity	Population	%
Bosniaks	165,186	81.4
Croats	9,360	4.6
Serbs	7,018	3.5
Did Not declare	4,370	2.2
Others	16,721	8.2
Unknown	262	0.1
Total	202,917	

== Representatives ==
Convocation	Representatives									
2000–2002	Faris Gavrankapetanović (SDA)	Mirsad Kebo (SDA)	Ivan Brigić (SDP)	Slaviša Šućur (SDP)	Nijaz Skenderagić (SDP)	Safet Halilović (SBiH)	Šahbaz Džihanović (SBiH)	Besima Marić (SDP)	Irfan Hozo (SDP)	Azra Hadžiahmetović (SBiH)
2002–2006	Bakir Izetbegović (SDA)	Avdo Hebib (SDA)	Irfan Ajanović (SDA)	Slaviša Šućur (SDP)	Nijaz Skenderagić (SDP)	Safet Halilović (SBiH)	Šahbaz Džihanović (SBiH)	7 seats		
2006–2010	Amor Mašović (SDA)	Hajriz Bećirović (SDA)	Nijaz Duraković (SDU)	Slaviša Šućur (SDP)	Alija Behmen (SDP)	Safet Halilović (SBiH)	Gavrilo Grahovac (SBiH)	7 seats		
2010–2014	Denis Zvizdić (SDA)	Besima Borić (SDP)	Svetozar Pudarić (SDP)	Slaviša Šućur (SDP)	Fehim Škaljić (SBB)	Safet Halilović (SBiH)	Mirza Ustamujić (SBB)	7 seats		
2014–2018	Denis Zvizdić (SDA)	Dževad Hodžić (SDA)	Dženan Đonlagić (DF)	Rusmir Mesihović (SDP)	Ibrahim Hadžibajrić (SBB)	Dennis Gratz (NS)	Zana Marjanović (SBB)	7 seats		
2018–2022	Asim Sarajlić (SDA)	Sebija Izetbegović (SDA)	Samer Rešidat (DF)	Irfan Čengić (SDP)	Mirsad Kacila (SBB)	Sabina Ćudić (NS)	Goran Akšamija (NiP)	7 seats		
2022–2026	Edin Smajić (SDA)	Jasmina Bišćević-Tokić (SDA)	Dennis Gratz (DF)	Jasna Duraković (SDP)	Elmedin Konaković (NiP)	Damir Arnaut (NS)	Amra Junuzović-Kaljić (NiP)	7 seats		
2026-2030	Edin Smajić (SDA)	Sebija Izetbegović (SDA)	Dennis Gratz (DF)	Igor Stojanović (SDP)	Almir Bečarević (SBiH)	Edin Forto (NS)	Rijad Konjhodžić (NiP)	7 seats		
