= 7th electoral unit of the House of Representatives of the Federation of Bosnia and Herzegovina =

Parliamentary constituency

7th electoral unit
- House of Representatives of the Federation of Bosnia and Herzegovina constituency
- Electoral unit within the Federation of Bosnia and Herzegovina

Current constituency
- Created: 2000
- Seats: 9 (2000-2002); 6 (2002-present)

The seventh electoral unit of the Federation of Bosnia and Herzegovina is a parliamentary constituency used to elect members to the House of Representatives of the Federation of Bosnia and Herzegovina since 2000. It consists of Bosnian-Podrinje Canton Goražde and the southern part of Sarajevo Canton, including the municipalities of Novi Grad, Hadžići, Trnovo and Ilidža.

== Demographics ==
Ethnicity	Population	%
Bosniaks	203,702	86.9
Croats	8,184	3.5
Serbs	7,167	3.1
Did Not declare	2,957	1.3
Others	11,780	5.0
Unknown	620	0.3
Total	234,410	

== Representatives ==
Convocation	Representatives								
2000-2002	Alma Bandić (SDA)	Emir Hodžić (SDA)	Amer Ćenanović (SDA)	Ismet Briga (SBiH)	Zaim Backović (SBiH)	Karlo Filipović (SDP)	Azra Jasika (SBiH)	Hamdija Hadžihasanović (SDP)	Suada Hadžović (SDP)
2002-2006	Alma Bandić (SDA)	Nedžad Bublin (SDA)	Amila Husović-Alikadić (SDA)	Omer Vatrić (SBiH)	Zaim Backović (SBiH)	Karlo Filipović (SDP)	6 seats		
2006-2010	Irfan Ajanović (SDA)	Nezaheta Akšamija (SDA)	Salem Halilović (SBiH)	Omer Vatrić (SBiH)	Dervo Bandić (SBiH)	Karlo Filipović (SDP)	6 seats		
2010-2014	Safet Kešo (SDA)	Faruk Jabučar (SBB)	Mirvad Kurić (SBB)	Omer Vatrić (SBiH)	Damir Hadžić (SDP)	Karlo Filipović (SDP)	6 seats		
2014-2018	Safet Kešo (SDA)	Aiša Ćenanović (SDA)	Zlatko Kravić (SBB)	Dževad Adžem (DF)	Amra Kunovac (DF)	Damir Mašić (SDP)	6 seats		
2018-2022	Eldar Čomor (SDA)	Adnan Efendić (SDA)	Zlatko Kravić (SBB)	Nihad Čolpa (DF)	Nermin Muzur (NiP)	Damir Mašić (SDP)	6 seats		
2022-2026	Eldar Čomor (SDA)	Dragan Mioković (NS)	Haris Silajdžić (SBiH)	Mirza Čelik (DF)	Adnan Delić (NiP)	Damir Mašić (SDP)	6 seats		
2026-2030	Adnan Efendić (SDA)	Lelja Čomor (SDA)	Haris Gudić (SBiH)	Edina Gabela (SBiH)	Elvedin Okerić (NiP)	Damir Mašić (SDP)	6 seats		
