= 4th electoral unit of the House of Representatives of the Federation of Bosnia and Herzegovina =

Parliamentary constituency

4th electoral unit
- House of Representatives of the Federation of Bosnia and Herzegovina constituency
- Electoral unit within the Federation of Bosnia and Herzegovina

Current constituency
- Created: 2000
- Seats: 6 (2000-2002); 4 (2002-present)

The fourth electoral unit of the Federation of Bosnia and Herzegovina is a parliamentary constituency used to elect members to the House of Representatives of the Federation of Bosnia and Herzegovina since 2000. Located within Tuzla Canton, it consists of the municipalities of Živinice, Kalesija, Banovići, Kladanj, Sapna and Teočak

== Demographics ==
Ethnicity	Population	%
Bosniaks	136,912	94.7
Croats	2,853	2.0
Serbs	1,081	0.7
Did Not declare	373	0.3
Others	3,220	2.2
Unknown	102	0.1
Total	144,541	

== Representatives ==
Convocation	Representatives					
2000-2002	Safet Softić (SDA)	Bajro Kasumović (SDA)	Kasim Brigić (SDP)	Husein Trumić (SBiH)	Rasim Omerović (SDA)	Ejub Čokić (SDP)
2002-2006	Safet Softić (SDA)	Muhamed Kamberović (SDA)	Ramiz Zahirović (SDP)	Husein Trumić (SBiH)	4 seats	
2006-2010	Safet Softić (SDA)	Fadil Hamzić (SDA)	Ramiz Zahirović (SDP)	Husein Trumić (SBiH)	4 seats	
2010-2014	Safet Softić (SDA)	Mehdin Selimović (SDA)	Ramiz Zahirović (SDP)	Sead Omerbegović (SBiH)	4 seats	
2014-2018	Mirsad Kukić (SDA)	Sanel Razić (SBB BiH)	Hasan Muratović (SDP)	Elzina Pirić (SDA/PDA)	4 seats	
2018-2022	Edita Mažić (SDA)	Denijal Tulumović (SDA)	Hasan Muratović (SDP)	Elzina Pirić (SDA/PDA)	4 seats	
2022-2026	Edita Mažić (SDA)	Begajeta Čaušević (SDA)	Hajrudin Kozarević (SDP)	Elzina Pirić (SDA/PDA)	4 seats	
2026-2030	Bego Gutić (SDA)	Hasiba Kurtić (SDA)	Nusret Mamić (SDP)	Elzina Pirić (SDA/PDA)	4 seats	
