= Elections in the Party of Democratic Action =

Elections in Bosnia and Herzegovina

Elections in the Party of Democratic Action, as part of its regularly held party congresses, have been held numerous times since the party's establishment in 1990.

== 2005 leadership election ==
The 2005 Party of Democratic Action leadership election was held as part of the party's 4th congress. The incumbent leader Sulejman Tihić ran for a second term as president. Elmir Jahić was the remaining candidate.

Tihić was re-elected in the first ballot with 61.1% of the vote.

=== Results ===
Candidates	Votes	%
Sulejman Tihić	360	61.1
Elmir Jahić	230	38.9
Delegate votes:	590	100
Source: Results

== 2009 leadership election ==
The 2009 Party of Democratic Action leadership election was held as part of the party's 5th congress. The incumbent leader Sulejman Tihić ran for a third term as president. Bakir Izetbegović and Adnan Terzić were the two remaining candidates.

Tihić was re-elected in the first ballot with 57.1% of the vote.

=== Results ===
Candidates	Votes	%
Sulejman Tihić	425	57.1
Bakir Izetbegović	301	40.4
Adnan Terzić	19	2.5
Delegate votes:	745	100
Source: Results

== 2013 leadership election ==
The 2013 Party of Democratic Action leadership election was held as part of the party's convention. Incumbent president Sulejman Tihić ran for his fourth term and was unopposed following an agreement between him and the party's deputy president Bakir Izetbegović, for a convention to be held instead of a regular congress.

Tihić was elected almost unanimously, with 93.6% of the vote.

=== Results ===
Candidate	Votes	%
Sulejman Tihić	190	93.6
Delegate votes:	203	100
Source: Results

== 2015 leadership election ==
The 2015 Party of Democratic Action leadership election was held as part of the party's 6th congress, following the death of Sulejman Tihić. Bakir Izetbegović served as the acting leader and ran for a full term. Šemsudin Mehmedović and Irfan Ajanović were the two remaining candidates.

Izetbegović was easily elected in the first ballot with 78.4% of the vote.

=== Results ===
Candidates	Votes	%
Bakir Izetbegović	590	78.4
Šemsudin Mehmedović	159	21.1
Irfan Ajanović	4	0.5
Delegate votes:	753	100
Source: Results

== 2019 leadership election ==
The 2019 Party of Democratic Action leadership election was held as part of the party's 7th congress. Incumbent president Bakir Izetbegović ran for his second term and was unopposed following the party's victory in the 2018 general election. He was unanimously elected with all 1,227 delegate votes.

=== Results ===
Candidate	Votes	%
Bakir Izetbegović	1,227	100
Delegate votes:	1,227	100
Source: Results

== 2023 leadership election ==
The 2023 Party of Democratic Action leadership election was held as part of the party's 8th congress. Incumbent president Bakir Izetbegović ran for his third term and was unopposed. He was almost unanimously elected with 99.3% of the vote.

=== Results ===
Candidate	Votes	%
Bakir Izetbegović	1,276	99.3
Delegate votes:	1,285	100
Source: Results
