= Izetbegović =

Izetbegović is a Bosnian surname, a patronymic derived from "Izet-beg" (meaning "Izet, the chieftain"). Notable people with the surname include:

- Alija Izetbegović (1925–2003), first president of Bosnia and Herzegovina
- Bakir Izetbegović (born 1956), politician from Bosnia and Herzegovina
