= List of heads of the Bosnian-Podrinje Canton Goražde =

Prime Minister of Bosnian-Podrinje Canton Goražde
- Premijer Bosansko-podrinjskog kantona Goražde
- Coat of arms of Bosnian-Podrinje Canton Goražde
- Incumbent; Senad Čeljo since 13 November 2025
- Appointer: Bosnian-Podrinje Goražde Cantonal Assembly
- Inaugural holder: Rijad Raščić (as governor); Hamid Pršeš (as prime minister)
- Formation: May 1996

This is a list of heads of the Bosnian-Podrinje Canton Goražde.

== Heads of the Bosnian-Podrinje Canton Goražde (1996–present) ==
Party of Democratic Action
Party for Bosnia and Herzegovina
Social Democratic Party
New Beginning
People and Justice

=== Governors ===
№	Portrait	Name (Born–Died)	Term of Office		Party
1		Rijad Raščić	1996	May 2000	SDA
2		Alija Begović (1953–)	May 2000	9 February 2001	SDA
3		Salem Halilović (1962–)	9 February 2001	6 October 2002	SBiH

=== Prime Ministers ===
№	Portrait	Name (Born–Died)	Term of Office		Party
1		Hamid Pršeš (1954–)	May 1996	August 1999	SDA
2		Zijad Deljo (1959–)	August 1999	October 2000	SDA
3		Mustafa Kurtović (1951–)	October 2000	9 March 2001	SDA
4		Ibrahim Kulin	9 March 2001	5 February 2003	SDP BiH
5		Salko Obhođaš (1964–)	5 February 2003	19 January 2006	SDA
6		Nazif Uruči (1956–)	19 January 2006	19 February 2007	SDA
7		Salem Halilović (1962–)	19 February 2007	1 December 2008	SBiH
(6)		Nazif Uruči (1956–)	1 December 2008	23 December 2010	SDA
8		Muhidin Pleh	23 December 2010	24 February 2011	SDA
9		Emir Frašto (1954–)	24 February 2011	8 January 2015	SDP BiH
10		Emir Oković (1977–)	8 January 2015	26 April 2019	SDA
11		Aida Obuća (1975–)	26 April 2019	7 December 2022	SDA
12		Edin Ćulov	7 December 2022	24 October 2025	NP
13		Senad Čeljo	24 October 2025	27 October 2025	NiP
(12)		Edin Ćulov	27 October 2025	13 November 2025	NP
(13)		Senad Čeljo	13 November 2025	Incumbent	NiP
