= 1st electoral unit of the House of Representatives of the Federation of Bosnia and Herzegovina =

Parliamentary constituency

1st electoral unit
- House of Representatives of the Federation of Bosnia and Herzegovina constituency
- Electoral unit within the Federation of Bosnia and Herzegovina

Current constituency
- Created: 2000
- Seats: 12 (2000-2002); 9 (2002-present)

The first electoral unit of the Federation of Bosnia and Herzegovina is a parliamentary constituency used to elect members to the House of Representatives of the Federation of Bosnia and Herzegovina since 2000. It consists of Una-Sana Canton.

== Demographics ==
Ethnicity	Population	%
Bosniaks	246,012	90.0
Croats	5,073	1.9
Serbs	8,452	3.1
Did Not declare	1,847	0.7
Others	11,539	4.2
Unknown	338	0.1
Total	273,261	

== Representatives ==
Convocation	Representatives											
2000-2002	Ibrahim Nadarević (SDA)	Husein Nanić (SDA)	Alaga Topić (SDA)	Mustafa Avdagić (SDA)	Mahmut Alagić (SDP)	Hafeza Sabljaković (DNZ)	Rifet Dolić (DNZ)	Safet Šarganović (SBiH)	Sulejman Kazić (SBiH)	Ejub Alagić (SDA)	Fatima Toromanović (SDA)	Nermina Ćemalović (SDP)
2002-2006	Ibrahim Nadarević (SDA)	Husein Nanić (SDA)	Senad Šepić (SDA)	Mustafa Avdagić (SDA)	Senad Šarganović (SDP)	Hafeza Sabljaković (DNZ)	Rifet Dolić (DNZ)	Alaga Topić (SBiH)	Zijad Nanić (SBiH)	9 seats		
2006-2010	Ibrahim Nadarević (SDA)	Edham Veladžić (SDA)	Senad Šepić (SDA)	Jasminka Durić (SDA/ A-SDA)	Nermina Ćemalović (SDP)	Hafeza Sabljaković (DNZ)	Nermin Purić (DNZ)	Jasminka Horović (SBiH)	Alija Kurtović (SBiH)	9 seats		
2010-2014	Ibrahim Nadarević (SDA)	Šemsudin Dedić (SDA)	Amir Avdić (SDA)	Jasminka Durić (SDA/ A-SDA)	Mahmut Alagić (SDP)	Hafeza Sabljaković (DNZ)	Braco Kulenović (DNZ)	Mirnes Alagić (SBiH)	Hazim Kapić (SBB)	9 seats		
2014-2018	Sead Kadić (SDA)	Esad Bašagić (SDA)	Kasim Mulalić (SDA)	Mirsad Topić (A-SDA)	Hajrudin Havić (SDP)	Ismet Kurić (A-SDA)	Almir Zulić (DF)	Elma Đogić (LP)	Azra Bećirspahić-Hadžić (SBB)	9 seats		
2018-2022	Hamdija Abdić (SDA)	Husein Rošić (SDA)	Asim Kamber (SDA)	Irfan Durić (A-SDA/ NES)	Albin Muslić (SDP)	Tahir Nuhić (A-SDA)	Zeid Mujić (DF)	Mirvet Beganović (LP)	Azra Bećirspahić-Hadžić (SBB)	9 seats		
2022-2026	Hamdija Abdić (SDA)	Nijaz Hušić (SDA)	Safet Kovačević (SDA)	Irfan Durić (A-SDA/ NES)	Razim Halkić (SDP)	Sandi Salkić (NES)	Zekerijah Alagić (DF)	Ilda Alibegović (NES)	Maja Uremović (POMAK)	9 seats		
2026-2030	Hamdija Abdić (SDA)	Nijaz Hušić (SDA)	Bisenija Mušedinović (SDA)	Nermin Ogrešević (NES)	Armin Halitović (SDP)	Dženita Muratagić (NES)	Almir Zulić (DF)	Hamdija Lipovača (SBiH)	Šuhret Fazlić (POMAK)	9 seats		
