= 8th electoral unit of the House of Representatives of the Federation of Bosnia and Herzegovina =

Parliamentary constituency

8th electoral unit
- House of Representatives of the Federation of Bosnia and Herzegovina constituency
- Electoral unit within the Federation of Bosnia and Herzegovina

Current constituency
- Created: 2000
- Seats: 13 (2000-2002); 9 (2002-present)

The eighth electoral unit of the Federation of Bosnia and Herzegovina is a parliamentary constituency used to elect members to the House of Representatives of the Federation of Bosnia and Herzegovina since 2000. It consists of Central Bosnia Canton.

== Demographics ==
Ethnicity	Population	%
Bosniaks	146,652	57.6
Croats	97,629	38.3
Serbs	3,043	1.2
Did Not declare	1,014	0.4
Others	5,240	2.1
Unknown	1,108	0.4
Total	254,686	

== Representatives ==
Convocation	Representatives												
2000-2002	Melika Mahmutbegović (SDA)	Salko Selman (SDA)	Adnan Terzić (SDA)	Željko Bojčetić (HDZ)	Ivica Udovičić (HDZ)	Franjo Franjić (NHI)	Slavica Josipović (HDZ/ HDZ 1990)	Zukan Helez (SDP)	Zahid Mustajbegović (SBiH)	Fikret Kilim (SDP)	Ismet Kalčo (SDP)	Omer Ljubunčić (SBiH)	Nikica Petrović (HDZ)
2002-2006	Melika Mahmutbegović (SDA)	Tahir Demirović (SDA)	Nedžad Hadžić (SDA)	Zoran Marić (HDZ)	Rudo Vidović (HDZ)	Mijat Tuka (NHI)	Slavica Josipović (HDZ/ HDZ 1990)	Zukan Helez (SDP)	Zahid Mustajbegović (SBiH)	9 seats			
2006-2010	Refik Lendo (SDA)	Dževad Agić (SDA)	Nurdin Atrović (SDA)	Marinko Čavara (HDZ)	Katica Čerkez (HDZ)	Abdulah Garača (SBiH)	Slavica Josipović (HDZ/ HDZ 1990)	Zukan Helez (SDP)	Zahid Mustajbegović (SBiH)	9 seats			
2010-2014	Melika Mahmutbegović (SDA)	Dževad Agić (SDA)	Željka Bošnjak (HDZ)	Marinko Čavara (HDZ)	Katica Čerkez (HDZ)	Aner Begić (SBB)	Slavica Josipović (HDZ/ HDZ 1990)	Zukan Helez (SDP)	Adil Lozo (SBiH)	9 seats			
2014-2018	Dževad Makić (SDA)	Salko Selman (SDA)	Bajro Makić (SDA)	Marinko Čavara (HDZ)	Jozo Lučić (HDZ 1990)	Mehrudin Švago (SBB)	Slavica Josipović (HDZ/ HDZ 1990)	Zukan Helez (SDP)	Ilhan Bušatlić (DF)	9 seats			
2018-2022	Melika Mahmutbegović (SDA)	Mirsad Peco (SDA)	Senad Mašetić (SDA)	Marinko Čavara (HDZ)	Lidija Bradara (HDZ)	Faika Mujanović-Glamočanin (SBB)	Boris Marjanović (HDZ)	Nijaz Helez (SDP)	Mara Đukić (DF)	9 seats			
2022-2026	Melika Mahmutbegović (SDA)	Alija Jusić (SDA)	Bajro Makić (SDA)	Feliks Vidović (HDZ)	Lidija Bradara (HDZ)	Stipe Tokić (HDZ 1990)	Mirjana Plavčić (HDZ)	Nijaz Helez (SDP)	Mara Đukić (DF)	9 seats			
2026-2030	Mujo Trako (SDA)	Alija Jusić (SDA)	Alisa Karahodžić (SDA)	Ilija Nakić (HDZ)	Lidija Bradara (HDZ)	Ramiz Meša (SBiH)	Marijan Marjanović (HDZ)	Besim Belegić (SDP)	Deala Bećirović Helez (SDP)	9 seats			
