= 2nd electoral unit of the House of Representatives of the Federation of Bosnia and Herzegovina =

Parliamentary constituency

2nd electoral unit
- House of Representatives of the Federation of Bosnia and Herzegovina constituency
- Electoral unit within the Federation of Bosnia and Herzegovina

Current constituency
- Created: 2000
- Seats: 6 (2000-2002); 5 (2002-present)

The second electoral unit of the Federation of Bosnia and Herzegovina is a parliamentary constituency used to elect members to the House of Representatives of the Federation of Bosnia and Herzegovina since 2000. It consists of Posavina Canton, the Brčko District, and the Tuzla Canton Municipalities of Gradačac, Doboj East and Gračanica.

== Demographics ==
Ethnicity	Population	%
Bosniaks	134,450	60.6
Croats	51,860	23.4
Serbs	30,229	13.6
Did Not declare	1,058	0.5
Others	3,583	1.6
Unknown	597	0.3
Total	221,777	

== Representatives ==
Convocation	Representatives					
2000-2002	Muhamed Lalić (SDA)	Amira Bravić (SDA)	Reuf Sokolović (SDP)	Sejad Berbić (SBiH)	Stjepan Mikić (HDZ)	Mijo Anić (NHI)
2002-2006	Muhamed Ibrahimović (SDA)	Fija Tokić (SDA)	Reuf Sokolović (SDP)	Sejad Berbić (SBiH)	Krunoslav Vukonić (HDZ)	5 seats
2006-2010	Muhamed Ibrahimović (SDA)	Hajrudin Mehanović (SDA)	Damir Mašić (SDP)	Munib Jusufović (SBiH)	Marinko Božić (HDZ)	5 seats
2010-2014	Muhamed Ibrahimović (SDA)	Omer Hećimović (SBB BiH)	Damir Mašić (SDP)	Alma Zildžić (SDP)	Marijan Živković (HDZ)	5 seats
2014-2018	Muhamed Ibrahimović (SDA)	Šemsudin Kavazović (SBB BiH)	Mujo Hasić (SDP)	Jasmin Kadić (DF)	Blaž Župarić (HDZ)	5 seats
2018-2022	Rahim Gadžić (SDA)	Husein Topčagić (PDA)	Mujo Hasić (SDP)	Mustafa Hrvić (DF)	Marijan Klaić (HDZ)	5 seats
2022-2026	Indira Omeragić (SDA)	Fadil Novalić (SDA)	Nihad Krajinović (SDP)	Alen Mujić (DF)	Mijo Matanović (HDZ)	5 seats
2026-2030	Indira Omeragić (SDA)	Rahim Gadžić (SDA)	Nihad Krajinović (SDP)	Mustafa Šakić (SD BiH)	Mijo Matanović (HDZ)	5 seats
