= Magazinović =

Magazinović is a surname. Notable people with the surname include:

- Kosta Magazinović (1819–1891), Serbian politician and diplomat
- Maga Magazinović (1882–1968), Serbian ballerina, librarian, and journalist
- Saša Magazinović (born 1978), Bosnian politician
- Stevan Magazinović (1804–1874), Serbian politician
