= 6th electoral unit of the House of Representatives of the Federation of Bosnia and Herzegovina =

Parliamentary constituency

6th electoral unit
- House of Representatives of the Federation of Bosnia and Herzegovina constituency
- Electoral unit within the Federation of Bosnia and Herzegovina

Current constituency
- Created: 2000
- Seats: 6 (2000-2002); 4 (2002-present)

The sixth electoral unit of the Federation of Bosnia and Herzegovina is a parliamentary constituency used to elect members to the House of Representatives of the Federation of Bosnia and Herzegovina since 2000. Located within Zenica-Doboj Canton, it consists of the municipalities of Breza, Kakanj, Olovo, Visoko, and Vareš.

== Demographics ==
Ethnicity	Population	%
Bosniaks	97,340	88.0
Croats	6,913	6.2
Serbs	954	0.9
Did Not declare	667	0.6
Others	4,637	4.2
Unknown	103	0.1
Total	110,614	

== Representatives ==
Convocation	Representatives					
2000-2002	Mirsad Zaimović (SDA)	Kemal Čelebić (SDA)	Izudin Neimarlija (SDP)	Vahid Hećo (SBiH)	Aziz Brotlija (SDA)	Nihad Čengić (SDP)
2002-2006	Mirsad Zaimović (SDA)	Kemal Čelebić (SDA)	Irfan Imamović (SDP)	Fikret Bečirović (SBiH)	4 seats	
2006-2010	Mirsad Zaimović (SDA)	Džemail Silajdžić (SBiH)	Irfan Imamović (SDP)	Nusret Sirćo (SBiH)	4 seats	
2010-2014	Mirsad Zaimović (SDA)	Zijad Alajbegović (SBB BiH)	Irfan Imamović (SDP)	Rahman Dželo (SBiH)	4 seats	
2014-2018	Mirza Ganić (SDA)	Enver Merdić (SBB BiH)	Jasmina Zubić (SDP)	Mujo Hodžić (DF)	4 seats	
2018-2022	Mirza Ganić (SDA)	Irfan Imamović (SDA)	Jasmina Zubić (SDP)	Hajrudin Žilić (DF)	4 seats	
2022-2026	Mirsad Zaimović (SDA)	Đemal Memagić (SDA)	Belmin Zukan (SDP)	Hajrudin Žilić (DF)	4 seats	
2026-2030	Mirza Ganić (SDA)	Mirza Mušija (SDA)	Iso Delibašić (SDA)	Selma Hušić (SDA)	4 seats	
