= Clinical Center of the University of Sarajevo =

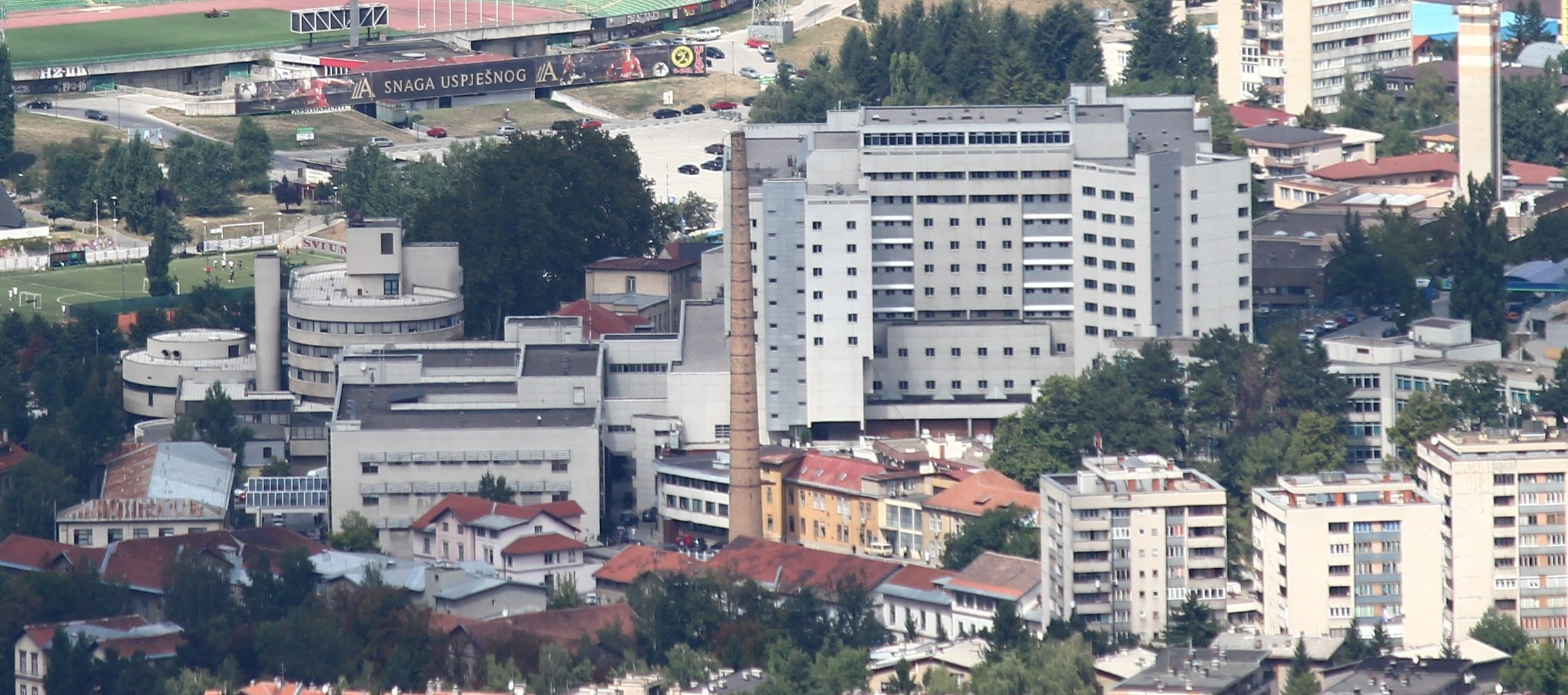
- The KCUS main campus at Koševo.

- KCUS is located in Sarajevo

Geography
- Location: Bolnička 25, Sarajevo, Sarajevo Canton, Bosnia and Herzegovina
- Coordinates: 43.869171°N 18.415607°E

Organisation
- Care system: Public
- Type: Teaching
- Affiliated university: University of Sarajevo

Services
- Standards: Accredited by AKAZ
- Emergency department: Yes

History
- Former name: State Hospital (Zemaljska bolnica)
- Opened: 1894

Links
- Website: kcus.ba

The Clinical Center of the University of Sarajevo (Bosnian: Klinički centar Univerziteta u Sarajevu, KCUS or Bosnian: Univerzitetski klinički centar Sarajevo, UKCS), often known as Koševo Hospital (Bosnian: Bolnica "Koševo"), is the largest public hospital and primary medical center in Bosnia and Herzegovina, located in Sarajevo.

Established in 1894 as the State Hospital (Zemaljska bolnica), it serves as the primary teaching base for the Faculty of Medicine at the University of Sarajevo. The center is organized across multiple sites (Koševo, Jezero, Podhrastovi) and comprises 37 clinics.

During the Siege of Sarajevo, the hospital was a primary target but remained operational, becoming a center for war surgery. In the post-war era, particularly from 2016 to 2023, it became the subject of significant political and public controversy regarding its management, finances, and role during the COVID-19 pandemic.

== History ==
=== Founding (State Hospital) ===
The Clinical Center was established in 1894 as the State Hospital (Zemaljska bolnica). It was designed based on the model of the University Hospital in Vienna, following all modern European standards of the time, and was one of the most modern hospitals in Europe upon construction. The need to educate local medical staff led to the eventual establishment of the Faculty of Medicine at the University of Sarajevo, for which the hospital serves as the teaching base.

=== Role during the Siege of Sarajevo (1992–1995) ===
During the Siege of Sarajevo, the KCUS (then known as KBC - Clinical-Hospital Center) was systematically targeted by the Army of Republika Srpska. Despite clear Red Cross markings, 350 grenades and other explosive devices struck the Center. Five patients were killed in direct attacks, and 51 employees were killed either at work or elsewhere in the city during the war.

The estimated material damage was 38 million euros. The Clinics for Gynecology and Obstetrics and for Pediatrics (at the Jezero site), along with the Institute for Physical Medicine, were completely destroyed, while the Institute for Vascular Diseases was severely damaged.

Beyond being a target, the hospital became a global symbol of resistance and a hub for the development of war surgery. Medical staff worked in basement operating theaters, contending with mass-casualty events and a total lack of electricity, water, and supplies, forcing them to innovate surgical and treatment protocols.

== Organization and sites ==
KCUS is a complex system organized across four primary sites in Sarajevo:

- Koševo Campus: The main and largest site, holding the majority of clinics, the Central Medical Block (CMB), the Diagnostics and Polyclinic (DIP) building, and the center's administration.
- Jezero Campus: Houses the Clinics for Pediatrics (1 and 2), Gynecology, and Obstetrics.
- Podhrastovi Campus: Houses the Clinic for Pulmonology and Tuberculosis.
- Čekaluša Site: Houses the Clinic for Vascular Diseases.

Construction on the 15-story Central Medical Block (CMB) and the DIP buildings began in 1996. The CMB building now houses key departments, including the Clinic for Radiology, Clinic for Oncology, Clinic for Cardiac Surgery, and the Central Operating Block. In March 2024, after decades of delays, a "warm tunnel" was completed, physically connecting the CMB with the Clinic for General and Abdominal Surgery.

== Management and controversies ==
As the largest, most-funded, and only "Level 3" university hospital in the Federation, control over KCUS is a central point of political and financial conflict in Bosnia and Herzegovina.

=== Funding and political conflict ===
The funding and governance of KCUS are a subject of ongoing dispute between its two main founders, the Government of the Federation of BiH (historically led by the SDA) and the Government of Sarajevo Canton (led by the "Trojka" coalition since 2020). The conflict primarily revolves around the appointment of the Board of Directors and the settlement of massive, accumulating debts.

=== 2016–2023 management ===
One of the most controversial periods in the hospital's history was the 2016–2023 mandate of General Director Prof. Dr. Sebija Izetbegović, a high-ranking official of the SDA party and wife of party president Bakir Izetbegović.

This period was defined by media reports and public allegations of political influence over the institution, accumulating financial debts, and a mass "brain drain" of prominent, long-serving doctors.

=== Institutional rivalry ===
The exodus of specialists from KCUS, particularly after the high-profile dismissal of the head of orthopedics, Dr. Ismet Gavrankapetanović, directly led to the strengthening of the rival General Hospital "Prim. dr. Abdulah Nakaš". The General Hospital, funded by Sarajevo Canton, became a refuge for the departing staff, creating an institutional and political rivalry between the two main hospitals in the city.

=== COVID-19 pandemic controversies ===
During the COVID-19 pandemic, KCUS was the center of a major public scandal. In April 2021, an anonymous letter from 17 anesthesiologists at KCUS was leaked, alleging catastrophic conditions in the COVID wards and claiming that patients were dying on faulty "Srebrena Malina" (Silver Raspberry) ventilators. While the management denied the claims, the Prosecutor's Office of BiH opened a case, causing widespread public alarm.

=== Academic status controversy ===
A parallel controversy focused on the academic legitimacy of General Director Izetbegović. As KCUS is a university hospital, its director must hold a valid professorship. After a lengthy investigation into missing documentation, the Senate of the University of Sarajevo voted in March 2023 to revoke Sebija Izetbegović's master's and doctoral degrees, which automatically stripped her of her professorship and, consequently, her eligibility to run the hospital.

=== Current management (2023–present) ===
Following the 2022 election and the formation of a new government in the Federation, Sebija Izetbegović was formally dismissed in November 2023. Dr. Ismet Gavrankapetanović, the same doctor whose 2017 dismissal symbolized the exodus of staff, was appointed acting General Director, a move widely seen in Sarajevo as the symbolic end of the previous era.

== Education and staff ==
KCUS is the primary teaching base for the University of Sarajevo School of Medicine and the Faculty of Health Sciences.

According to a 2020 media report, KCUS employed 3,317 staff members.
