= Aida Obuća =

Bosnian politician (born 1975)

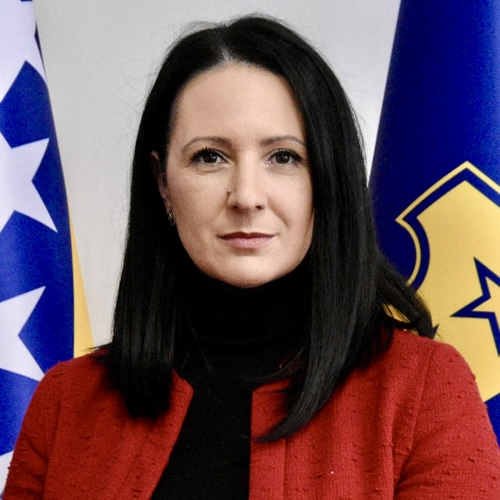
- Official portrait, 2022

Member of the Federal House of Peoples
- Incumbent
- Assumed office 30 December 2022

Prime Minister of the Bosnian-Podrinje Canton Goražde
- In office 26 April 2019 – 7 December 2022
- Preceded by: Emir Oković
- Succeeded by: Edin Ćulov

Personal details
- Born: 9 July 1975 (age 51) Goražde, SR Bosnia and Herzegovina, SFR Yugoslavia
- Party: Party of Democratic Action
- Spouse: Nermin Obuća
- Children: 2
- Education: University of Sarajevo

Aida Obuća (born 9 July 1975) is a Bosnian politician serving as member of the Federal House of Peoples since 2022. She previously served as Prime Minister of the Bosnian-Podrinje Canton Goražde from 2019 to 2022. She is the current vice-president of the Party of Democratic Action.

== Early life and education ==
Aida Obuća (née Džaferović) was born on 9 July 1975, in Goražde, SFR Bosnia and Herzegovina, SFR Yugoslavia. She completed her primary and secondary education in her hometown and subsequently earned a Bachelor of Laws degree from the Faculty of Law of the University of Sarajevo.

== Wartime period ==
Following the outbreak of the Bosnian War, Obuća volunteered for the Army of the Republic of Bosnia and Herzegovina, serving in Goražde. Her contributions included logistical support and legal work at the District Military Court of Goražde. She remained in service until the conclusion of the war and the signing of the Dayton Agreement.

== Career in sports ==
Obuća began her sports career with the Women's Handball Club "Radnički" Goražde and later with "Goražde." Her team achieved notable success, including a third-place finish in the national championship and participation in the EHF Cup. Obuća's contributions to the sport were recognized with the title of best athlete of Goražde and induction into the hall of fame of ŽRK "Goražde."

== Professional career ==
Obućan also pursued a legal career, working in the Cantonal Court in Goražde from 1995 to 2006. After this period, she held the position of head of the department for legal and economic affairs at the Public Enterprise Bosansko-Podrinjske šume (English: Bosnian-Podrinje forest agency).

== Political career ==
=== President of the Assembly of Bosnian-Podrinje Canton Goražde ===
Obuća began her political career with the Party of Democratic Action (SDA). She held various positions in local government, including roles in the municipal council of Goražde. In 2014, she became the first female president of the Assembly of the Bosnian-Podrinje Canton Goražde.

=== First female Prime Minister of Bosnian-Podrinje Canton Goražde ===
In 2019, Obuća was elected Prime Minister of the Bosnian-Podrinje Canton Goražde, the first woman to hold this position in the Federation of Bosnia and Herzegovina. During her tenure, she focused on financial stability, social welfare, anti-corruption measures, and infrastructure development.

=== Federal Legislature ===
Following the 2022 general elections, Obuća resigned as Prime Minister and was elected as a delegate to the House of Peoples of the Parliament of the Federation of Bosnia and Herzegovina.

=== Party activity ===
Obuća held various positions within the SDA, including roles at the municipal and cantonal levels. She was elected to the national Main Board at the 2019 party congress. Subsequently, she was appointed to the party's presidency and, at the 8th SDA Congress in October 2023, was elected as the party's only female vice president.
