= 3rd electoral unit of the House of Representatives of the Federation of Bosnia and Herzegovina =

Parliamentary constituency

3rd electoral unit
- House of Representatives of the Federation of Bosnia and Herzegovina constituency
- Electoral unit within the Federation of Bosnia and Herzegovina

Current constituency
- Created: 2000
- Seats: 9 (2000-2002); 7 (2002-present)

The third electoral unit of the Federation of Bosnia and Herzegovina is a parliamentary constituency used to elect members to the House of Representatives of the Federation of Bosnia and Herzegovina since 2000. Located within Tuzla Canton, it consists of the municipalities of Tuzla, Lukavac, Srebrenik and Čelić.

== Demographics ==
Ethnicity	Population	%
Bosniaks	164,627	80.0
Croats	19,731	9.6
Serbs	5,463	2.7
Did Not declare	2,749	1.3
Others	12,848	6.2
Unknown	261	0.1
Total	205,679	

== Representatives ==
Convocation	Representatives								
2000-2002	Ismet Osmanović (SDA)	Sadik Latifagić (SDA)	Refik Ahmedinović (SDP)	Edhem Muftić (SDP)	Ivo Divković (SDP)	Hazim Šadić (SBiH)	Mirnes Ajanović (BOSS)	Abdurahman Fazlić (SDP)	Mirsada Muharemagić (SDP)
2002-2006	Izudin Kešetović (SDA)	Nihada Latifagić (SDA)	Enver Mehmedović (SDP)	Edhem Muftić (SDP)	Hasan Bećirović (SDP)	Sead Bećirović (SBiH)	Mirnes Ajanović (BOSS)	7 seats	
2006-2010	Ismet Osmanović (SDA)	Hazim Bašić (SDA)	Enver Mehmedović (SDP)	Mirza Kušljugić (SDP)	Saudin Hodžić (SDP)	Midhat Osmanović (SBiH)	Mehmed Žilić (SBiH)	7 seats	
2010-2014	Osman Suljagić (SDA)	Sead Hasanhodžić (SDA)	Enver Mehmedović (SDP)	Zlatan Fatušić (SDP)	Tomo Vidović (SDP)	Midhat Osmanović (SBiH)	Mirsad Đonlagić (SBB)	7 seats	
2014-2018	Osman Suljagić (SDA)	Tarik Arapčić (SDA)	Enver Bijedić (SDP)	Amra Haračić (DF)	Mahir Mešalić (DF)	Mahir Nurkanović (SBB)	Bahrudin Hadžiefendić (SBB)	7 seats	
2018-2022	Ibrahim Zukić (SDA)	Samira Begić (SDA)	Zlatko Ercegović (SDP)	Meliha Bijedić (SDP)	Bahrudin Šarić (DF)	Azmir Husić (PDA/ SDA)	Adin Huremović (SBB)	7 seats	
2022-2026	Salko Zildžić (SDA)	Dajana Čolić (DF)	Kadrija Hodžić (SDP)	Azra Okić (SDP)	Mahir Mešalić (DF)	Azmir Husić (PDA/ SDA)	Admir Čavalić (SBiH/ NiP)	7 seats	
2026-2030	Irfan Halilagić (SDA)	Edin Vikalo (SDA)	Vedran Lakić (SDP)	Vedrana Petrović (SDP)	Mustafa Tabaković (DF)	Amra Nadarević Vodenčarević (NS)	Admir Čavalić (SBiH/ NiP)	7 seats	
