= 1st electoral unit of the National Assembly of Republika Srpska =

Parliamentary constituency

1st electoral unit
- National Assembly of Republika Srpska constituency
- Electoral unit within Republika Srpska

Current constituency
- Created: 2014
- Seats: 7

The first electoral unit of Republika Srpska is a parliamentary constituency used to elect members to the National Assembly of Republika Srpska since 2014. It consists of the Municipalities of Krupa na Uni, Novi Grad, Kozarska Dubica, Prijedor, Oštra Luka and Kostajnica.

== Demographics ==
Ethnicity	Population	%
Bosniaks	39,127	26.4
Croats	2,464	1.7
Serbs	103,168	69.5
Did Not declare	1,146	0.8
Others	2,058	1.4
Unknown	433	0.3
Total	148,396	

== Representatives ==
Convocation	Deputies						
2014-2018	Drago Tadić (SNSD)	Vanja Bajić (SNSD)	Darko Banjac (SDS)	Dušan Berić (SDS)	Senad Bratić (SDA)	Marko Pavić (DNS)	Perica Bundalo (PDP)
2018-2022	Dražen Vrhovac (SNSD)	Dragoslav Kabić (SNSD)	Milan Tubin (SDS)	Duško Ivić (DNS)	Senad Bratić (SDA)	Mirko Sovilj (DNS)	Perica Bundalo (PDP)
2022-2026	Dražen Vrhovac (SNSD)	Dragoslav Kabić (SNSD)	Maja Dragojević-Stojić (SDS)	Aleksandra Stupar-Radić (SNSD)	Mirsad Duratović (DF/SDP)	Dragan Brdar (DNS)	Milanko Mihajlica (PDP)
2026-2030	Slobodan Javor (SNSD)	Jovana Drljač (SNSD)	Vladimir Ćopić (SDS)	Dijana Aramanda (SNSD)	Mirsad Duratović (DF/SDP)	Darko Banjac (DNS)	Maja Dragojević-Stojić (PSS)
