= 3rd electoral unit of the House of Representatives of Bosnia and Herzegovina (Federation of Bosnia and Herzegovina) =

Parliamentary constituency

3rd electoral unit of the Federation of Bosnia and Herzegovina
- House of Representatives of Bosnia and Herzegovina constituency
- Electoral unit within Bosnia and Herzegovina

Current constituency
- Created: 2000
- Seats: 4
- Representatives: Haris Zahiragić (SDA); Džemal Smajić (SBiH); Saša Magazinović (SDP); Elmedin Konaković (NiP)

The third electoral unit of the Federation of Bosnia and Herzegovina is a parliamentary constituency used to elect members to the House of Representatives of Bosnia and Herzegovina since 2000. It consists of Sarajevo Canton and Bosnian-Podrinje Canton Goražde.

== Demographics ==
Ethnicity	Population	%
Bosniaks	368,888	84.4
Croats	17,544	4.0
Serbs	14,185	3.2
Did Not declare	7,327	1.7
Others	28,501	6.5
Unknown	882	0.2
Total	437,327	

== Representatives ==
Convocation	Representatives			
2000–2002	Hasan Mašović (SDA)	Bogić Bogićević (SDP)	Zlatko Lagumdžija (SDP)	Beriz Belkić (SBiH)
2002–2006	Hasan Muratović (SDA)	Abdulah Nakaš (SDA)	Zlatko Lagumdžija (SDP)	Nijaz Duraković (SBiH)
2006–2010	Bakir Izetbegović (SDA)	Beriz Belkić (SBiH)	Zlatko Lagumdžija (SDP)	Azra Hadžiahmetović (SBiH)
2010–2014	Asim Sarajlić (SDA)	Beriz Belkić (SBiH)	Zlatko Lagumdžija (SDP)	Ismeta Dervoz (SBB BiH)
2014–2018	Asim Sarajlić (SDA)	Željko Komšić (DF)	Hanka Vajzović (DF)	Fehim Škaljić (SBB BiH)
2018–2022	Denis Zvizdić (SDA/ NiP)	Dženan Đonlagić (DF)	Saša Magazinović (SDP)	Predrag Kojović (NS)
2022–2026	Denis Zvizdić (SDA/ NiP)	Amor Mašović (SDA)	Saša Magazinović (SDP)	Sabina Ćudić (NS)
2026-2030	Haris Zahiragić (SDA)	Džemal Smajić (SBiH)	Saša Magazinović (SDP)	Elmedin Konaković (NiP)

== Election results ==
=== 2026 election ===
Party	Votes	%	Mandates
Party of Democratic Action	52,901	28.04	1
Party for Bosnia and Herzegovina	34,817	18.45	1
Social Democratic Party	31,069	16.47	1
People and Justice - Social Democrats	27,059	14.34	1
Our Party	16,497	8.74	0
Democratic Front - Civic Alliance	14,629	7.75	0
Union for a Better Future of BiH	2,804	1.48	0
Red Lines	2,123	1.12	0
People's European Union - Forward! - Movement of Democratic Action	2,083	1.10	0
Croatian Democratic Union and allies	1,48	0.78	0
Bosnian-Herzegovinian Greens	1,298	0.68	0
Republicans of Bosnia and Herzegovina	1,137	0.60	0
Croatian Five	741	0.39	0

=== 2022 election ===
Party	Votes	Mandates
People and Justice	49180	1
Party of Democratic Action	46866	1
Our Party	33456	1
Social Democratic Party	28051	1
DF	24382	0
NES	14419	0
Party for Bosnia and Herzegovina	11419	0
Union for a Better Future of BiH	6049	0
PzP–NB	5891	0
Bosnian Party	2097	0
Croatian Democratic Union	1829	0
Social Democrats	1238	0
Alliance of Independent Social Democrats	383	0
Bosnia and Herzegovina Greens	252	0
Croatian Republican Party	216	0
HDZ 1990	199	0
United Srpska	168	0
Bosnia and Herzegovina Initiative	147	0
Party of Democratic Progress	106	0
Union for New Politics	79	0
Re-Balance	28	0
Circle	20	0
SMS	18	0
The Left Wing	10	0

=== 2018 election ===
Party	Votes	%	Mandates
Party of Democratic Action	63315	27.56	1
Our Party	32063	13.96	1
Democratic Front	29216	12.72	1
Social Democratic Party	26326	11.46	1
Union for a Better Future of BiH	25321	11.02	0
People and Justice	21416	9.32	0
Bosnian-Herzegovinian Patriotic Party	7571	3.3	0
Independent Bosnia-Herzegovina List	6025	2.62	0
Independent Bloc	3959	1.72	0
Party for Bosnia and Herzegovina	3684	1.6	0
Pensioners Party	2660	1.16	0
Croatian Democratic Union	2197	0.96	0
Party of Democratic Activity	1955	0.85	0
Bosnian Party	1799	0.78	0
LDS za Boljitak	757	0.33	0
Alliance of Independent Social Democrats	695	0.3	0
HDZ 1990-HSP	603	0.26	0
Union for New Politics	127	0.06	0
Lijevo Krilo	57	0.02	0

=== 2014 election ===
Party	Votes	%	Mandates
Democratic Front	61815	27664	2
Party of Democratic Action	58830	26328	1
Union for a Better Future of BiH	41226	18450	1
Social Democratic Party	15150	6780	0
Our Party	10913	4884	0
Bosnian-Herzegovinian Patriotic Party-Sefer Halilović	10865	4862	0
Party for Bosnia and Herzegovina	4753	2127	0
Social Democratic Union - Union for Us All	3112	1393	0
Bosnian Party	2327	1041	0
People's Party for Work and Betterment	2250	1007	0
SPP–SDU–DNZ	2172	0.972	0
HDZ–HSS–HKDU–HSP-AS BiH–HSP HB	1694	0.758	0
HSP–DSI	1619	0.725	0
Diaspora Party	1486	0.665	0
Communist Party	1444	0.646	0
Croatian Democratic Union 1990	1419	0.635	0
Alliance of Independent Social Democrats	1227	0.549	0
New Beginning	834	0.373	0
PDP-NDP	194	0.087	0
Labour Party of Bosnia and Herzegovina	119	0.053	0
Total valid	223449	100	

=== 2010 election ===
Party	Votes	%	Mandates
Social Democratic Party	62362	28.18	1
Union for a Better Future of BiH	39453	17.83	1
Party of Democratic Action	34781	15.72	1
Party for Bosnia and Herzegovina	26098	11.79	1
Patriotic Party	11855	5.36	0
People's Party for Work and Betterment	8237	3.72	0
Social Democratic Union	6528	2.95	0
Jump Cacaus	6478	2.93	0
Our Party	6162	2.78	0
Bosnian Party	5850	2.64	0
Retirement Party	3504	1.58	0
Alliance of Independent Social Democrats	2398	1.08	0
Croatian Democratic Union of BiH	2159	0.98	0
Party of Democratic Activity	1451	0.66	0
Liberal Democratic Party	971	0.44	0
Croatian Democratic Union 1990	837	0.38	0
GDS-NEP	698	0.32	0
Democratic Party of the disabled	448	0.20	0
HSS - NHI	399	0.18	0
People's Party	351	0.16	0
Democratic People's Union	279	0.13	0
Total valid	220539	100	

=== 2006 election ===
Party	Votes	%	Mandates
Party for Bosnia and Herzegovina	71486	36.72	2
Party of Democratic Action	42673	21.92	1
Social Democratic Party	31518	16.19	1
Patriotic Party	11323	5.82	0
Bosnian Patriotic Block	9624	4.94	0
People's Party for Work and Betterment	462	2.37	0
Liberal Democratic Party	4161	2.14	0
Alliance of Independent Social Democrats	3697	1.90	0
Youth Political Movement	325	1.67	0
Pensioners' Party	2608	1.34	0
HDZ-HNZ	1688	0.87	0
Civil Democratic Party	1468	0.75	0
Movement for changes	1383	0.71	0
Croatian Democratic Union 1990	1051	0.54	0
Bosnian National Party	1038	0.53	0
European Ecological Party	904	0.46	0
Croatian Party of Rights	578	0.30	0
Bosansko Podrinjska Narodna Stranka	446	0.23	0
Socialist Party	334	0.17	0
Free Democrats	317	0.16	0
Democratic People's Union	265	0.14	0
Justice and Morals	239	0.12	0
Total valid	187588	100	

=== 2002 election ===
Party	Votes	Mandates
Party of Democratic Action	42994	2
Party for Bosnia and Herzegovina	39667	1
Social Democratic Party	29655	1

=== 2000 election ===
Party	Votes	Mandates
Social Democratic Party	63325	2
Party for Bosnia and Herzegovina	44529	1
Party of Democratic Action	37537	1
