= 7th electoral unit of the National Assembly of Republika Srpska =

Parliamentary constituency

7th electoral unit
- National Assembly of Republika Srpska constituency
- Electoral unit within Republika Srpska

Current constituency
- Created: 2014
- Seats: 7

The seventh electoral unit of Republika Srpska is a parliamentary constituency used to elect members to the National Assembly of Republika Srpska since 2014. It consists of the Municipalities of Osmaci, Zvornik, Šekovići, Vlasenica, Bratunac, Srebrenica and Milići.

== Demographics ==
Ethnicity	Population	%
Bosniaks	45,870	35.8
Croats	227	0.2
Serbs	81,439	63.5
Did Not declare	174	0.1
Others	353	0.3
Unknown	227	0.2
Total	128,290	

== Representatives ==
Convocation	Deputies						
2014-2018	Obren Marković (SNSD)	Dušica Savić (SNSD)	Dragomir Vasić (SDS)	Siniša Ilić (SDS)	Nedim Čivić (SDA)	Spomenka Stevanović (DNS)	Dragan Galić (PDP)
2018-2022	Obren Marković (SNSD)	Dušica Savić (SNSD)	(Zoran Stevanović; SNSD)	Kostadin Vasić (SDS/ US)	Edin Ramić (SDA)	Spomenka Stevanović (DNS)	Savo Vulić (PS)
2022-2026	Aleksandar Krsmanović (SNSD)	Dragomir Vasić (SDS)	(Zoran Stevanović; SNSD)	Kostadin Vasić (SDS/ US)	Ramiz Salkić (SDA)	Dragan Galić (NPS)	Petko Ranić (PS)
