= 2nd electoral unit of the National Assembly of Republika Srpska =

Parliamentary constituency

2nd electoral unit
- National Assembly of Republika Srpska constituency
- Electoral unit within Republika Srpska

Current constituency
- Created: 2014
- Seats: 7

The second electoral unit of Republika Srpska is a parliamentary constituency used to elect members to the National Assembly of Republika Srpska since 2014. It consists of the Municipalities of Gradiška, Laktaši, Srbac and Prnjavor.

== Demographics ==
Ethnicity	Population	%
Bosniaks	11,088	7.9
Croats	1,929	1.4
Serbs	122,628	87.4
Did Not declare	992	0.7
Others	3,446	2.5
Unknown	153	0.1
Total	140,236	

== Representatives ==
Convocation	Deputies						
2014-2018	Zoran Adžić (SNSD)	Snježana Kelečević (SNSD)	Nenad Kuzmić (SNSD)	Miladin Stanić (SDS)	Slavko Dunjić (SDS)	Milan Svraka (PDP)	Goran Đordić (DNS)
2018-2022	Darko Tomaš (SNSD)	Ognjen Žmirić (SNSD)	Saša Popović (SNSD)	Miladin Stanić (SDS)	Željko Babić (SDS)	Milan Svraka (PDP)	Dane Malešević (DNS)
2022-2026	Darko Tomaš (SNSD)	Miroslav Bojić (SNSD)	Radojica Vidović (SNSD)	Miladin Stanić (SDS)	Milan Petrović (SDS)	Radislav Dončić (PDP)	Denis Šulić (SNSD)
2026-2030	Bojana Vokić (SNSD)	Miroslav Bojić (SNSD)	Renata Obradović-Popović (SNSD)	Željko Sladojević (PSS)	Milan Petrović (SDS)	Aleksandar Trninić (US)	Miloš Gvero (SNSD)
