= 10th electoral unit of the House of Representatives of the Federation of Bosnia and Herzegovina =

Parliamentary constituency

10th electoral unit
- House of Representatives of the Federation of Bosnia and Herzegovina constituency
- Electoral unit within the Federation of Bosnia and Herzegovina

Current constituency
- Created: 2000
- Seats: 4 (2000-2002); 3 (2002-present)

The tenth electoral unit of the Federation of Bosnia and Herzegovina is a parliamentary constituency used to elect members to the House of Representatives of the Federation of Bosnia and Herzegovina since 2000. It consists of West Herzegovina Canton.

== Demographics ==
Ethnicity	Population	%
Bosniaks	718	0.8
Croats	93,725	98.8
Serbs	101	0.1
Did Not declare	66	0.1
Others	124	0.1
Unknown	164	0.2
Total	94,898	

== Representatives ==
Convocation	Representatives			
2000-2002	Bariša Čolak (HDZ)	Mile Lasić (HDZ)	Velimir Jukić (HDZ)	Stjepan Nosić (HDZ)
2002-2006	Smiljana Bradvica (HDZ)	Mile Lasić (HDZ)	Velimir Jukić (HDZ)	3 seats
2006-2010	Zoran Vukšić (HDZ)	Žarko Šantić (HDZ 1990)	Stranko Primorac (HSP)	3 seats
2010-2014	Predrag Kožul (HDZ)	Željko Tomić (HDZ)	Stranko Primorac (HSP)	3 seats
2014-2018	Dario Knezović (HDZ)	Radoslav Luburić (HDZ)	Vjekoslav Bakula (HDZ 1990)	3 seats
2018-2022	Dario Knezović (HDZ)	Stanko Musa (HDZ)	Ivica Pavković (HDZ)	3 seats
2022-2026	Dario Knezović (HDZ)	Stanko Musa (HDZ)	Marija Kikaš (HDZ)	3 seats
2026-2030	Toni Kraljević (HDZ)	Franka Leko (HDZ)	Ante Paković (HDZ 1990)	3 seats
