= 12th electoral unit of the House of Representatives of the Federation of Bosnia and Herzegovina =

Parliamentary constituency

12th electoral unit
- House of Representatives of the Federation of Bosnia and Herzegovina constituency
- Electoral unit within the Federation of Bosnia and Herzegovina

Current constituency
- Created: 2000
- Seats: 4 (2000-2002); 3 (2002-present)

The twelfth electoral unit of the Federation of Bosnia and Herzegovina is a parliamentary constituency used to elect members to the House of Representatives of the Federation of Bosnia and Herzegovina since 2000. It consists of Canton 10.

== Demographics ==
Ethnicity	Population	%
Bosniaks	8,037	9.6
Croats	64,604	76.8
Serbs	10,905	13.0
Did Not declare	215	0.3
Others	298	0.4
Unknown	68	0.1
Total	84,127	

== Representatives ==
Convocation	Representatives			
2000-2002	Ivica Lotak-Pašalić (HDZ)	Ivica Madunić (HDZ)	Tadija Ivančić (HDZ)	Ljubica Baković (HDZ)
2002-2006	Borjana Krišto (HDZ)	Ivica Čeko (HDZ)	Ivan Madunić (HDZ)	3 seats
2006-2010	Mato Franjičević (HDZ)	Ante Čolak (HDZ 1990)	Dragan Bauk (SNSD)	3 seats
2010-2014	Jozo Bagarić (HDZ)	Boro Krišto (HDZ 1990)	Velimir Kunić (SNSD)	3 seats
2014-2018	Jozo Bagarić (HDZ)	Boro Krišto (HDZ 1990)	Boris Barun (HDZ)	3 seats
2018-2022	Ante Baković (HDZ)	Boro Krišto (HDZ 1990)	Petar Galić (HDZ/ HNP)	3 seats
2022-2026	Karlo Nevistić (HDZ)	Drago Stanić (HDZ 1990)	Petar Galić (HDZ/ HNP)	3 seats
2026-2030	Tomislav Krišto (HDZ)	Ante Jurčević (HDZ 1990)	Petar Galić (HDZ/ HNP)	3 seats
