= Electoral units of Bosnia and Herzegovina =

List of electoral units

Elections to the various legislatures in Bosnia and Herzegovina are carried out using open Party-list proportional representation. Constituencies are numbered and are known as electoral units.

== House of Representatives of Bosnia and Herzegovina ==
A map of the Parliamentary constituencies of Bosnia and Herzegovina

For elections to the House of Representatives of Bosnia and Herzegovina, each of the eight units is contained completely within one entity of Bosnia and Herzegovina. In the Federation of Bosnia and Herzegovina, two cantons make up a unit; whereas in Republika Srpska, units are based on municipalities.

Entity	#	Boundaries	Seats
Federation of Bosnia and Herzegovina	1st	Una-Sana Canton and Canton 10	3
Federation of Bosnia and Herzegovina	2nd	Herzegovina-Neretva Canton and West Herzegovina Canton	3
Federation of Bosnia and Herzegovina	3rd	Sarajevo Canton and Bosnian-Podrinje Canton Goražde	4
Federation of Bosnia and Herzegovina	4th	Zenica-Doboj Canton and Central Bosnia Canton	6
Federation of Bosnia and Herzegovina	5th	Posavina Canton and Tuzla Canton	5
Republika Srpska	1st	The westmost stretch of Republika, extending far enough east to include the municipalities of Kotor Varoš, Čelinac, Prnjavor and Srbac	3
Republika Srpska	2nd	The remainder of Republika, either side of the Brčko district	3
Republika Srpska	3rd	The southmost stretch of Republika, extending far enough north to include the municipality of Zvornik	3

== House of Representatives of the Federation of Bosnia and Herzegovina ==
A map of the Parliamentary constituencies of the Federation of Bosnia and Herzegovina

There are twelve units for elections to the subnational House of Representatives of the Federation of Bosnia and Herzegovina. Five are cantons at large, three are sections of more populous cantons, and four contain whole small cantons and sections of larger ones.

#	Canton/District	Boundaries	Seats
1st	Una-Sana Canton	Whole Canton	9
2nd	Posavina Canton	All of Brčko and Posavina, and the Tuzla Canton Municipalities of Gradačac, Doboj East and Gračanica	5
2nd	Brčko District	All of Brčko and Posavina, and the Tuzla Canton Municipalities of Gradačac, Doboj East and Gračanica	5
2nd	Tuzla Canton	All of Brčko and Posavina, and the Tuzla Canton Municipalities of Gradačac, Doboj East and Gračanica	5
3rd	Tuzla Canton	Tuzla, Lukavac, Srebrenik and Čelić	7
4th	Tuzla Canton	Southern half	4
5th	Zenica-Doboj Canton	Zavidovići, Zenica and everything farther north	8
6th	Zenica-Doboj Canton	Southern half	4
8th	Central Bosnia Canton	Whole Canton	9
9th	Herzegovina-Neretva Canton	Whole Canton	8
10th	West Herzegovina Canton	Whole Canton	3
7th	Bosnian-Podrinje Canton Goražde	BPK and the southern part of Sarajevo, including Novi Grad and Ilidža	6
7th	Sarajevo Canton	BPK and the southern part of Sarajevo, including Novi Grad and Ilidža	6
11th	Sarajevo Canton	The remainder of Sarajevo	7
12th	Canton 10	Whole Canton	3

== National Assembly of Republika Srpska ==
A map of the Parliamentary constituencies of Republika Srpska, Bosnia and Herzegovina

The nine units for the National Assembly of Republika Srpska are based on municipalities. The current unit boundaries were drawn up for the 2014 election.

#	Boundaries	Seats
1st	The area bounded by the IEBL and the outer borders of the municipalities of Prijedor and Kozarska Dubica	7
2nd	Municipalities of Gradiška, Laktaši, Srbac and Prnjavor	7
3rd	The area bounded by the IEBL and the outer borders of the municipalities of Kotor Varoš, Čelinac and Banja Luka	12
4th	Municipalities of Brod, Derventa, Vukosavlje and Modriča	4
5th	Municipalities of Doboj, Stanari, Teslić and Petrovo	6
6th	The area from the city of Bijeljina to Šamac, including the Brčko District	9
7th	The municipalities of Osmaci, Zvornik, Šekovići, Vlasenica, Bratunac, Srebrenica and Milići	7
8th	The area bounded by the IEBL and the outer borders of the municipalities of Rogatica and Han Pijesak	4
9th	Everything south of the municipalities of Novo Goražde and Višegrad	7

A map of the old Parliamentary constituencies of Republika Srpska, Bosnia and Herzegovina, used until 2014

Previously there were six constituencies. In 2014, three of the most populous units were split and the remaining units were renumbered:

Old Units	New Units
1st	1st
1st	2nd
2nd	3rd
3rd	4th
3rd	5th
4th	6th
5th	7th
5th	8th
6th	9th
