= 4th electoral unit of the National Assembly of Republika Srpska =

Parliamentary constituency

4th electoral unit
- National Assembly of Republika Srpska constituency
- Electoral unit within Republika Srpska

Current constituency
- Created: 2014
- Seats: 4

The fourth electoral unit of Republika Srpska is a parliamentary constituency used to elect members to the National Assembly of Republika Srpska since 2014. It consists of the Municipalities of Derventa, Brod, Vukosavlje and Modriča.

== Demographics ==
Ethnicity	Population	%
Bosniaks	8,685	11.7
Croats	8,310	11.2
Serbs	55,569	74.7
Did Not declare	602	0.8
Others	1,016	1.4
Unknown	228	0.3
Total	74,410	

== Representatives ==
Convocation	Deputies			
2014-2018	Igor Žunić (SNSD)	Bojan Vidić (SNSD)	Stevo Joksimović (SDS)	Nade Planinčević (SDS)
2018-2022	Igor Žunić (SNSD)	Mara Milošević (SNSD)	Zoran Vidić (SDS)	Risto Marić (PS)
2022-2026	Igor Žunić (SNSD)	Denis Pijetlović (SNSD)	Pero Đurić (SDS)	Tamara Evđić (SDS)
2026-2030	Petar Jelić (SNSD)	Denis Pijetlović (SNSD)	Jovica Radulović (SDS)	Vedran Čakarević (PSS)
