= Amor Mašović =

Bosnian politician

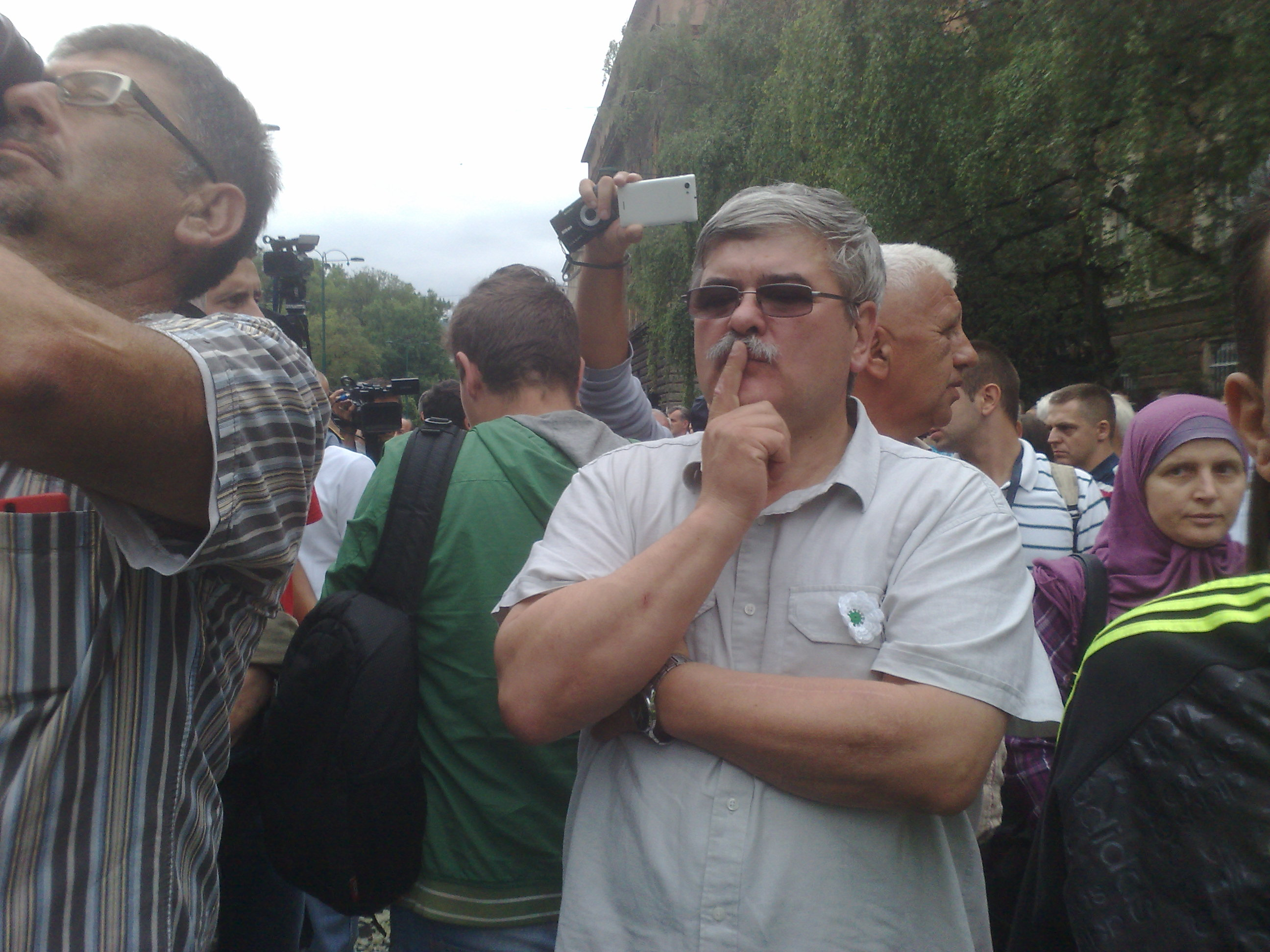
- Amor Mašović at funeral procession in Sarajevo for Srebrenica massacre funeral in 2015

Member of the House of Representatives
- Incumbent
- Assumed office 2022
- Constituency: 3rd Electoral Unit FBiH

Personal details
- Born: 29 November 1955 (age 70) Sarajevo, PR Bosnia and Herzegovina, SFR Yugoslavia
- Party: Party of Democratic Action
- Education: University of Sarajevo

Amor Mašović (born in Sarajevo, Bosnia and Herzegovina on 29 November 1955), is a Bosnian politician and Chairman of the Bosnian Federal Commission for Missing Persons. During the Bosnian War, Amor Mašović was the person responsible on the Bosnian government side for negotiating prisoner exchanges and was involved in the ultimately fruitless negotiations for the exchange of Col. Avdo Palić, the "disappeared" commander of the enclave of Žepa.

He is a Member of Parliament of the Bosnia and Herzegovina and a member of the International Association of Genocide Scholars.

== Investigations for Missing Persons in Bosnia and Herzegovina ==
As Chairman of the Commission for Missing Persons he is responsible for maintaining the records of individuals missing since the Bosnian War, efforts to trace such individuals, recording and identification of bodily remains, investigation of mass and individual graves, co-operation with local courts in conducting exhumations, autopsies, identifications and evidence gathering, assistance with burial arrangements, and cooperation with UN specialized agencies (UNHCR etc.), the UN Special Envoy for Human Rights in the territories of former Yugoslavia, SFOR, the ICRC Work Group on searching for missing persons, the International Criminal Tribunal for the former Yugoslavia at The Hague and other international and national organizations and institutions.

Under his leadership the Commission's investigative teams had as of 30 December 2007 located over 370 mass graves and over 3,000 joint and individual graves and the exhumation of the remains of some 18,000 missing war victims.

In October 2010, he was involved in investigations at Lake Perućac, which he has described as "the largest mass grave in Europe", estimating that there are over 2000 bodies in the lake, predominantly those of victims of the 1992 Višegrad massacres. On 19 July 2010, the Bosnian organisation began the search while the Serbian Commission for Missing Persons from Serbia and Kosovo joined in August. The corpses they discovered confirmed allegations that hundreds of Bosniak men, women and children were killed on various bridges and dumped into the Drina river where they floated into the Bajina Bašta Hydroelectric Power Plant. These killings happened over the course of around one month. The October 2010 investigations also searched for more ethnic Albanians from Kosovo after corpses of Albanians were found in a refrigerator truck in the lake in 2001.
