= Amer Ćenanović =

Bosnian politician (1961–2011)

Municipal Mayor of Ilidža
- In office 2 October 2004 – 1 April 2011
- Preceded by: Husein Mahmutović
- Succeeded by: Senaid Memić

Personal details
- Born: 25 December 1961 Butmir, PR Bosnia and Herzegovina, FPR Yugoslavia
- Died: 1 April 2011 (aged 49) Sarajevo, Bosnia and Herzegovina
- Party: Party of Democratic Action
- Education: University of Sarajevo (BE)
- Profession: Politician

Military service
- Allegiance: Republic of Bosnia and Herzegovina (1992–1995)
- Branch/service: ARBiH
- Years of service: 1992–1995
- Rank: Commander
- Commands: Municipal Civil Protection Headquarters
- Battles/wars: Bosnian War

Amer Ćenanović (25 December 1961 – 1 April 2011) was a Bosnian politician and former army commander who served as municipal mayor of Ilidža from 2004 until his death in 2011. He was a member of the Party of Democratic Action.

== Death and legacy ==
Ćenanović died unexpectedly on 1 April 2011 at the age of 49 in Sarajevo, Bosnia and Herzegovina. Following his death, the Eight Elementary School in Ilidža, where Ćenanović was at one point its principal, changed its name to the Amer Ćenanović Elementary School on 22 December 2011 in his honour. Two years later, on 3 April 2013, the first ever Amer Ćenanović Annual Race was held in Ilidža.

Political offices
Preceded by Husein Mahmutović	Municipal Mayor of Ilidža; 2004–2011	Succeeded by Senaid Memić
