= 6th electoral unit of the National Assembly of Republika Srpska =

Parliamentary constituency

6th electoral unit
- National Assembly of Republika Srpska constituency
- Electoral unit within Republika Srpska

Current constituency
- Created: 2014
- Seats: 9

The sixth electoral unit of Republika Srpska is a parliamentary constituency used to elect members to the National Assembly of Republika Srpska since 2014. It consists of the Municipalities of Ugljevik, Šamac, Donji Žabar, Pelagićevo, Bijeljina and Lopare as well as the Brčko District.

== Demographics ==
Ethnicity	Population	%
Bosniaks	53,311	21.4
Croats	23,164	9.3
Serbs	167,294	67.3
Did Not declare	1,405	0.6
Others	3,167	1.3
Unknown	259	0.1
Total	248,600	

== Representatives ==
Convocation	Deputies								
2014-2018	Milica Lovrić (SNSD)	Svetozar Jovanović (SNSD)	Siniša Maksimović (SNSD)	Tomica Stojanović (SDS)	Zlatko Maksimović (SDS)	Igor Ostojić (SDS)	Milan Dakić (DNS)	Slaviša Marković (PDP)	Vojin Mitrović (NDP)
2018-2022	Milica Lovrić (SNSD)	Milutin Tasovac (SNSD)	Nedeljko Ćorić (SNSD)	Tomica Stojanović (SDS)	Darko Mitrić (SDS)	Đorde Popović (DNS)	Milan Dakić (DNS)	Milenko Vićanović (PDP)	Petar Đokić (PS)
2022-2026	Slavenko Ristić (SNSD)	Milutin Tasovac (SNSD)	Vojin Mitrović (SNSD)	Želimir Nešković (SDS)	Ljubiša Petrović (SDS)	Milan Trninić (US)	Milan Dakić (DEMOS)	Slaviša Marković (PDP)	Petar Đokić (PS)
