= Dženan Đonlagić =

Bosnian politician and economist (born 1974)

Member of the House of Peoples
- Incumbent
- Assumed office 16 February 2023

Member of the House of Representatives
- In office 6 December 2018 – 1 December 2022
- Constituency: 3rd Electoral Unit FBiH

Personal details
- Born: 31 May 1974 (age 52) Doboj, SR Bosnia and Herzegovina, SFR Yugoslavia
- Party: Democratic Front (since 2013); Independent (before 2013)
- Education: International Islamic University; University of Sarajevo

Dženan Đonlagić (born 31 May 1974) is a Bosnian politician and economist who has served as member of the national House of Peoples since 2023. He was previously a member of the national House of Representatives from 2018 to 2022. Đonlagić is the former prorector of the University of Sarajevo and is the chief economic expert of the Democratic Front.

== Education ==
Đonlagić graduated from the Faculty of Economics at the International Islamic University Malaysia in 1997. He obtained a PhD at the University of Sarajevo in 2006 in the field of monetary and fiscal policy.

== Academic career ==
Đonlagić began teaching at the University of Sarajevo in 1998 as a teaching assistant. He became a professor of finances in 2006. He has also served as the vice-dean and executive manager of the University of Sarajevo School of Economics and Business from 2008 until 2011. In 2012, he became the prorector of the University of Sarajevo.

Đonlagić is an author of three books and of more than a dozen of papers in the fields of monetary policy, fiscal policy and central banking. He also frequently appears as an economic commentator at Al Jazeera Balkans.

== Political career ==
In 2013, Đonlagić became the head of the Council for Economic Rights of the Democratic Front, a newly formed social-liberal political party in Bosnia and Herzegovina. He is in charge of a team of experts responsible for drafting the party's economic and fiscal policy.
