= Džaferović =

Džaferović is a surname, derived from the Turkish personal name Cafer ("Jaafar"), ultimately of Arabic origin. Notable people with the surname include:

- Katarina Džaferović (born 2002), Montenegrin handball player
- Šefik Džaferović (born 1957), Bosnian politician
- Vanja Džaferović (born 1983), Croatian actor, TV personality, and footballer
