= Asim Sarajlić =

Bosnian politician

Municipal mayor of Vogošća
- In office 2 October 2004 – 30 November 2010
- Preceded by: Abdulah Ovčina
- Succeeded by: Edin Smajić
Additional positions
Member of the House of Peoples
In office 28 February 2019 – 16 February 2023
Member of the House of Representatives
In office 30 November 2010 – 6 December 2018
Constituency	3rd Electoral Unit

Personal details
- Born: 3 October 1975 (age 51) Vogošća, SR Bosnia and Herzegovina, SFR Yugoslavia
- Party: Party of Democratic Action (1990–present)
- Spouse: Emina Sarajlić
- Children: 2
- Education: University of Sarajevo

Military service
- Allegiance: Republic of Bosnia and Herzegovina
- Branch/service: Army of the Republic of Bosnia and Herzegovina
- Years of service: 1992–1995
- Rank: Soldier
- Battles/wars: Bosnian War

Asim Sarajlić (born 3 October 1975) is a Bosnian politician. He held a seat in the national House of Peoples from 2019 to 2023. Prior to this role, Sarajlić served as a member of the national House of Representatives from 2010 to 2018. From 2004 to 2010, he served as municipal mayor in Vogošća. He is a member of the Party of Democratic Action.

== Biography ==
Born in Vogošća in 1975, Sarajlić holds a degree from the Faculty of Political Science at the University of Sarajevo. In April 1992, he joined the Army of the Republic of Bosnia and Herzegovina as a juvenile and was wounded twice in the Bosnian War. He is married to Emina Sarajlić and they have two children.

Sarajlić served as mayor of the municipality of Vogošća from 2 October 2004 until 10 November 2010.

At the 2010 election Sarajlić was elected to the national House of Representatives for the SDA party, and re-elected in 2014. After the 2018 election, in February 2019, Sarajlić was appointed to the national House of Peoples. He served as member of the House of Peoples until February 2023.

Sarajlić was also a member of the presidency and Vice-president of the Party of Democratic Action until 3 March 2020, after which he resigned from both positions because of a political scandal.

In April 2022, Sarajlić was added to the US Treasury's Specially Designated Nationals and Blocked Persons List of individuals whose assets are blocked and U.S. persons are generally prohibited from dealing with them. Sarajlić was designated under Executive Order 14033, which targets persons who threaten the stability of the Western Balkans region through corruption, criminal activity, and other destabilizing behavior. The rationale behind Sarajlić's inclusion in the list cites instances of alleged abuse of his position in connection to BH Telecom, a significant state-owned enterprise in Bosnia and Herzegovina. According to the designation, he is accused of personally accepting payments from job applicants in exchange for positions and exerting undue influence over the hiring process. The document further notes that he recommended candidates who were purportedly severely underqualified, thereby undermining the integrity of the company.
