= Saša Magazinović =

Bosnian politician (born 1978)

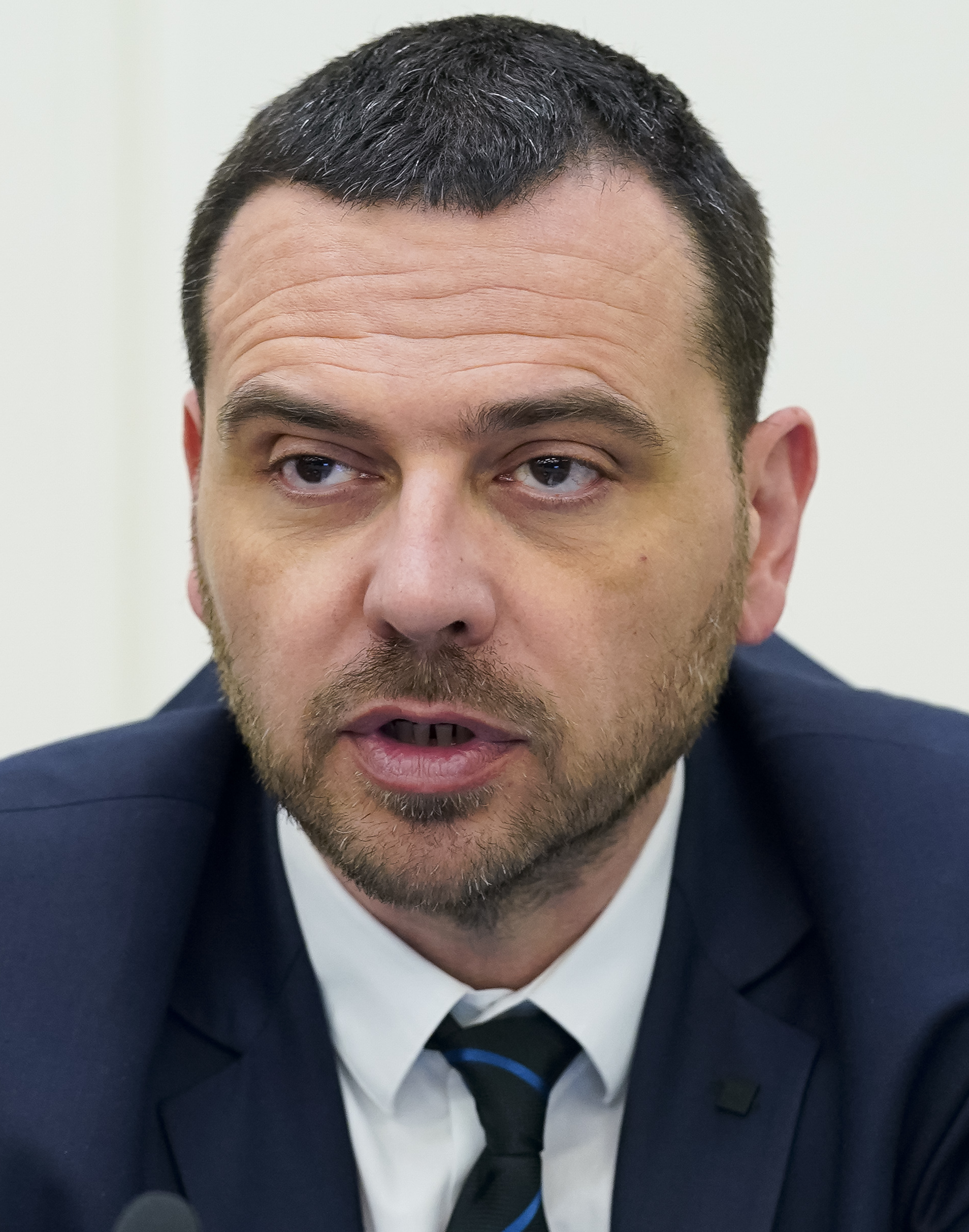
- Magazinović in 2025

Member of the House of Representatives
- Incumbent
- Assumed office 30 November 2010
- Constituency: 3rd Electoral Unit

Personal details
- Born: 1 November 1978 (age 47) Sarajevo, SR Bosnia and Herzegovina, SFR Yugoslavia
- Party: Social Democratic Party (1997–present)
- Spouse: Anamarija Magazinović
- Children: 2
- Education: University of Sarajevo (BE)

Saša Magazinović (Serbian Cyrillic: Саша Магазиновић; born 1 November 1978) is a Bosnian politician who has served as member of the national House of Representatives since 2010. He has been a member of the Social Democratic Party since 1997.

Magazinović was born in Sarajevo in 1978, where he graduated from the Faculty of Mechanical Engineering at the University of Sarajevo. He was elected to the national House of Representatives in the 2010 general election, having previously served as member of the Federal House of Peoples.

== Early life and education ==
Magazinović was born on 1 November 1978 in Sarajevo, SFR Yugoslavia, present-day Bosnia and Herzegovina. He graduated with a BE degree from the University of Sarajevo in 2010.

== Career ==
Magazinović has been a member of the Social Democratic Party (SDP BiH) since 1997. He was a member of the SDP BiH's presidency from 2009 to 2015. He was a councilor in the Municipal Council of Ilidža on two occasions. Magazinović was elected to the Sarajevo Canton Assembly following the 2006 general election. At the same time, he was a member of the Federal House of Peoples.

In the 2010 general election, Magazinović was elected to the national House of Representatives. He was re-elected to office in the 2014 and 2018 general election.

On 2 December 2020, Magazinović resigned as chairman of the SDP BiH's main board, due to alleged information that some members of the SDP BiH in the town of Srebrenica misused Bosniak documents in favor of Srebrenica mayor Mladen Grujičić during the 2020 municipal elections.

Magazinović was once again re-elected as member of the national House of Representatives in the 2022 general election, obtaining over 13,000 votes.

== Personal life ==
Saša is married to Anamarija Magazinović, and together they have two children. They live in Sarajevo.

=== Health ===
In November 2019, Magazinović underwent surgery after he was diagnosed with skin cancer. In December 2019, after his second surgery, Magazinović informed the public that "everything is clean and that there are no cancer cells left."
