= Bakir Izetbegović =

Bosnian politician (born 1956)

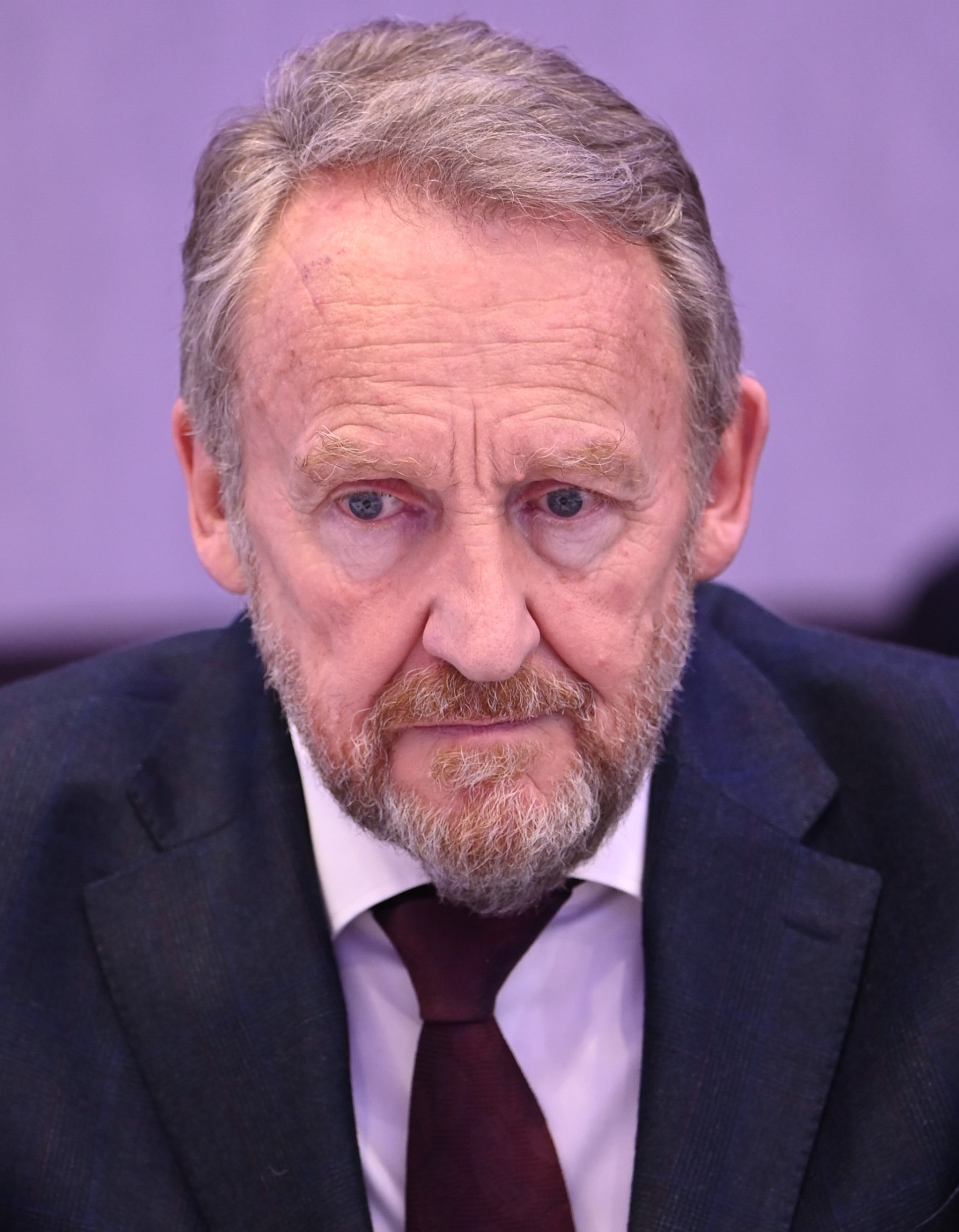
- Izetbegović in 2025

Bosniak member of the Presidency of Bosnia and Herzegovina
- In office 10 November 2010 – 20 November 2018 (Note: Serving as the Chairman of the Presidency from 10 March 2012 to 10 November 2012, from 10 March 2014 to 10 November 2014, from 17 March 2016 to 17 November 2017, and from 17 March 2018 to 20 November 2018.)
- Prime Minister: Nikola Špirić; Vjekoslav Bevanda; Denis Zvizdić
- Preceded by: Haris Silajdžić
- Succeeded by: Šefik Džaferović

President of the Party of Democratic Action
- Incumbent
- Assumed office 25 September 2014 (Note: Acting: 25 September 2014 – 26 May 2015)
- Preceded by: Sulejman Tihić
Parliamentary offices
Member of the House of Peoples
In office 28 February 2019 – 16 February 2023
Member of the House of Representatives
In office 20 November 2006 – 10 November 2010
Constituency	3rd Electoral Unit
Member of the Federal House of Representatives
In office 4 December 2002 – 20 November 2006
Constituency	11th Electoral Unit

Personal details
- Born: 28 June 1956 (age 70) Sarajevo, PR Bosnia and Herzegovina, FPR Yugoslavia
- Party: Party of Democratic Action (from 1990)
- Spouse: Sebija Građević (m. 1983)
- Children: 1
- Parent: Alija Izetbegović (father)
- Education: University of Sarajevo (BArch)
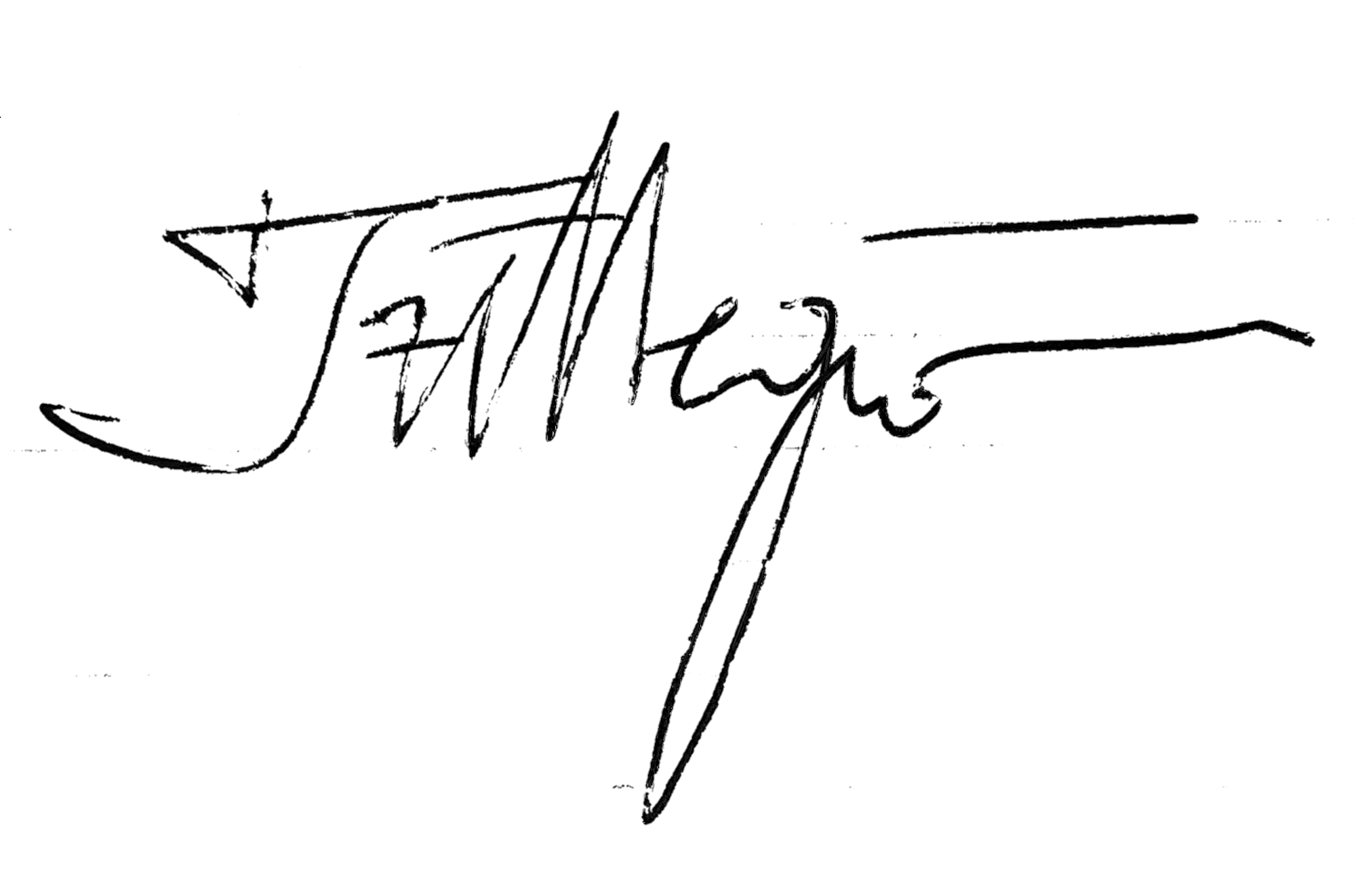
- Signature

Bakir Izetbegović (Note: Bosnian pronunciation: [bâːkir ǐzedbegoʋit͡ɕ]) (born 28 June 1956) is a Bosnian politician who served as the Bosniak member of the Presidency of Bosnia and Herzegovina from 2010 to 2018. He has been the president of the Party of Democratic Action (SDA) since 2014.

Born in Sarajevo in 1956, Izetbegović is the son of the only president of the Republic of Bosnia and Herzegovina, Alija Izetbegović. He graduated from the University of Sarajevo in 1981, working afterwards in architectural firms. After serving as director of the Construction Institute of the Sarajevo Canton, Izetbegović entered politics in 2000. In the 2006 general election, he was elected to the national Parliament.

In the 2010 general election, Izetbegović was elected Bosniak member of the Bosnian Presidency. He was re-elected four years later in the 2014 general election. As both Presidency member and president of the SDA, he took part in many constitutional reform talks for Bosnia and Herzegovina. During his presidency, Bosnia and Herzegovina faced difficulties following the 2014 Southeast Europe floods, as well as having mass riots some months before the floods. Following the 2018 general election, Izetbegović became a member of the national House of Peoples, serving until 2023. In both the 2022 and 2026 general elections, he once again ran for a seat in the Presidency as a Bosniak member, but was not elected on either occasion.

A member of the SDA since its foundation in 1990, Izetbegović has been a member of the party's presidency since 2002. He has been serving as the party's president since September 2014. Izetbegović has been accused of monopolizing the party and silencing most of his internal critics, while drawing power into his own hands and those of a few close allies.

== Early life and education ==
Bakir Izetbegović was born in Sarajevo, PR Bosnia and Herzegovina, FPR Yugoslavia on 28 June 1956. He is the son of the first President of independent Bosnia and Herzegovina, Alija Izetbegović and Halida Repovac.

He attended primary school and high school in Sarajevo and graduated from the Faculty of Architecture of the University of Sarajevo in 1981. From 1982 to 1992, Izetbegović worked as a consultant at an architectural consulting firm in Sarajevo.

He made big contributions to many social activities – he was a member of the management board of FK Sarajevo, a member of the management board of KK Bosna Royal and of the Management Board Member of the Muslim Humanitarian Society "Merhamet" and member of the Council of the Islamic Community of Bosnia and Herzegovina.

== Early political career ==
Izetbegović's father groomed him as his personal assistant to be the future Bosniak leader.

From 1991 to 2003, he served as director of the Construction Institute of the Sarajevo Canton. He entered politics in 2000 and after serving in two regional assemblies, was elected to the Parliamentary Assembly of Bosnia and Herzegovina in the 2006 general election.

He became the Deputy Head of his father's Party of Democratic Action (SDA) Caucus in the Sarajevo Canton Assembly in 2000, a position he continued to progressively undertake at higher levels – at the Federal House of Representatives from 2002 to 2006, and at the national House of Representatives from 2006 to 2010. He also became the Chairperson of the Delegation of the Parliamentary Assembly of Bosnia and Herzegovina in the Parliamentary Assembly of the Council of Europe.

Izetbegović has been a member of the SDA Presidency since 2002 and a member of the party since its foundation in 1990. In May 2015, he was elected president of the Party of Democratic Action, succeeding Sulejman Tihić.

== Presidency (2010–2018) ==
In the 2010 general election, Izetbegović was elected to the Presidency of Bosnia and Herzegovina as the Bosniak member. He came in first in a field of nine candidates with 35% of the vote. The runner up, Fahrudin Radončić, won 31% of the vote, while incumbent Haris Silajdžić won 25%. The remaining 9% of the votes were split among other candidates.

=== Domestic policy ===
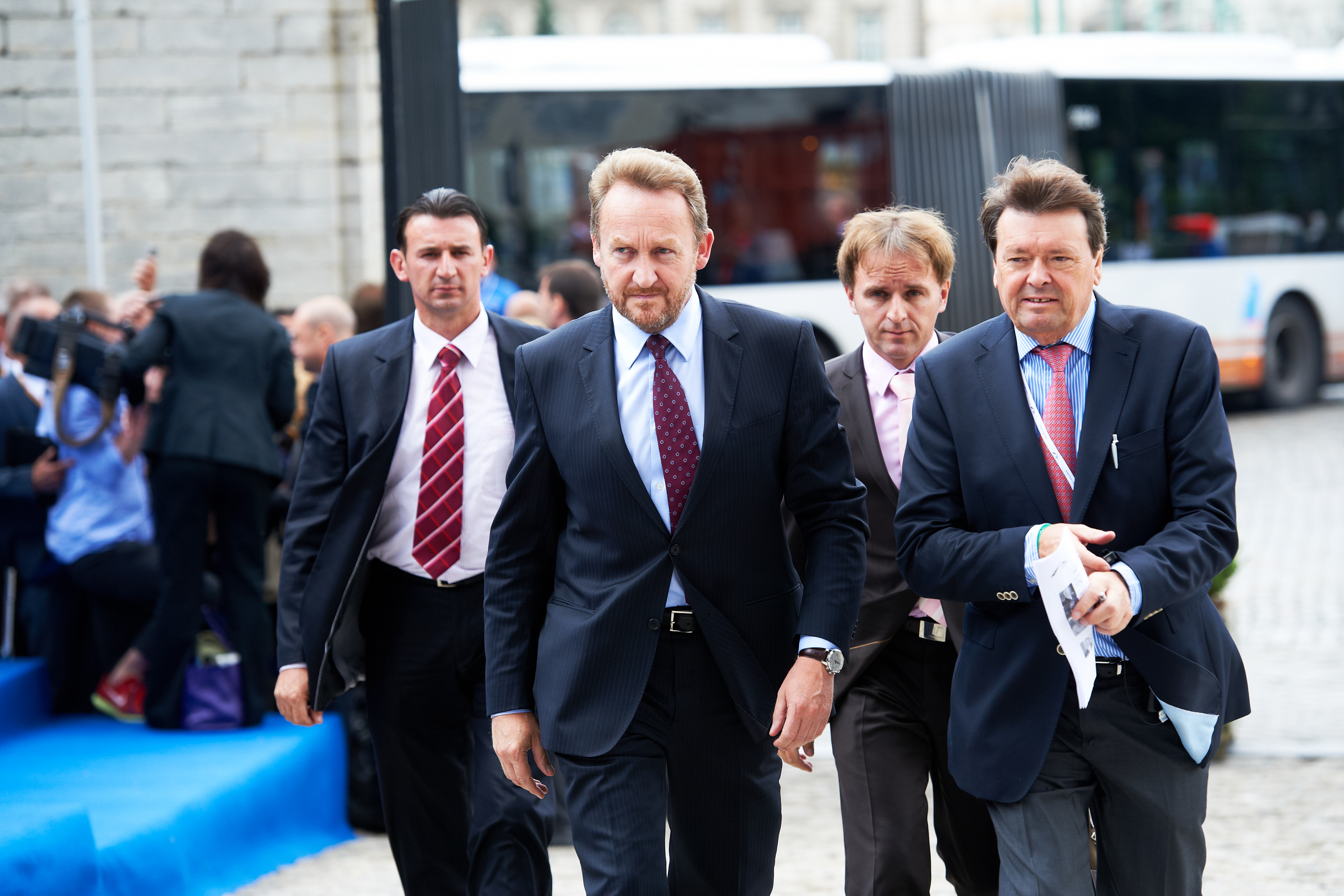
Izetbegović arriving to an EPP summit in Vienna, 23 June 2011

In February 2011, Izetbegović attended a panel in New York City, dedicated to the Dayton Agreement, organized by the Clinton Foundation. The panel was also attended by Croatian President Ivo Josipović.

In the 2014 general election, Izetbegović ran for a second term in the Presidency, winning 247,235 votes, 32.8% of the total and being elected for a second time. He was followed by Fahrudin Radončić with 26.7% and Emir Suljagić with 15.1%. Seven other candidates split the remaining 25% of the votes cast. During his campaign for the election, Izetbegović promised that there will be 100,000 new jobs if people voted for him.

In November 2017, he threatened with war if Republika Srpska opted for independence, and at the same time controversially said that Bosnia and Herzegovina should recognize the independence of Kosovo. On 22 November 2017, a discussion was held on the matter on the TV show Globalno of RTV BN.

On 7 October 2018, Šefik Džaferović, a member and vice president of Izetbegović's SDA, won the 2018 general election for the Bosniak membership of the Presidency and succeeded Izetbegović as the 7th Bosniak member of the Presidency of Bosnia and Herzegovina. During his presidency, Izetbegović held the chairmanship of the Presidency four times all together during the period from 2010 to 2018.

==== Constitutional reform ====
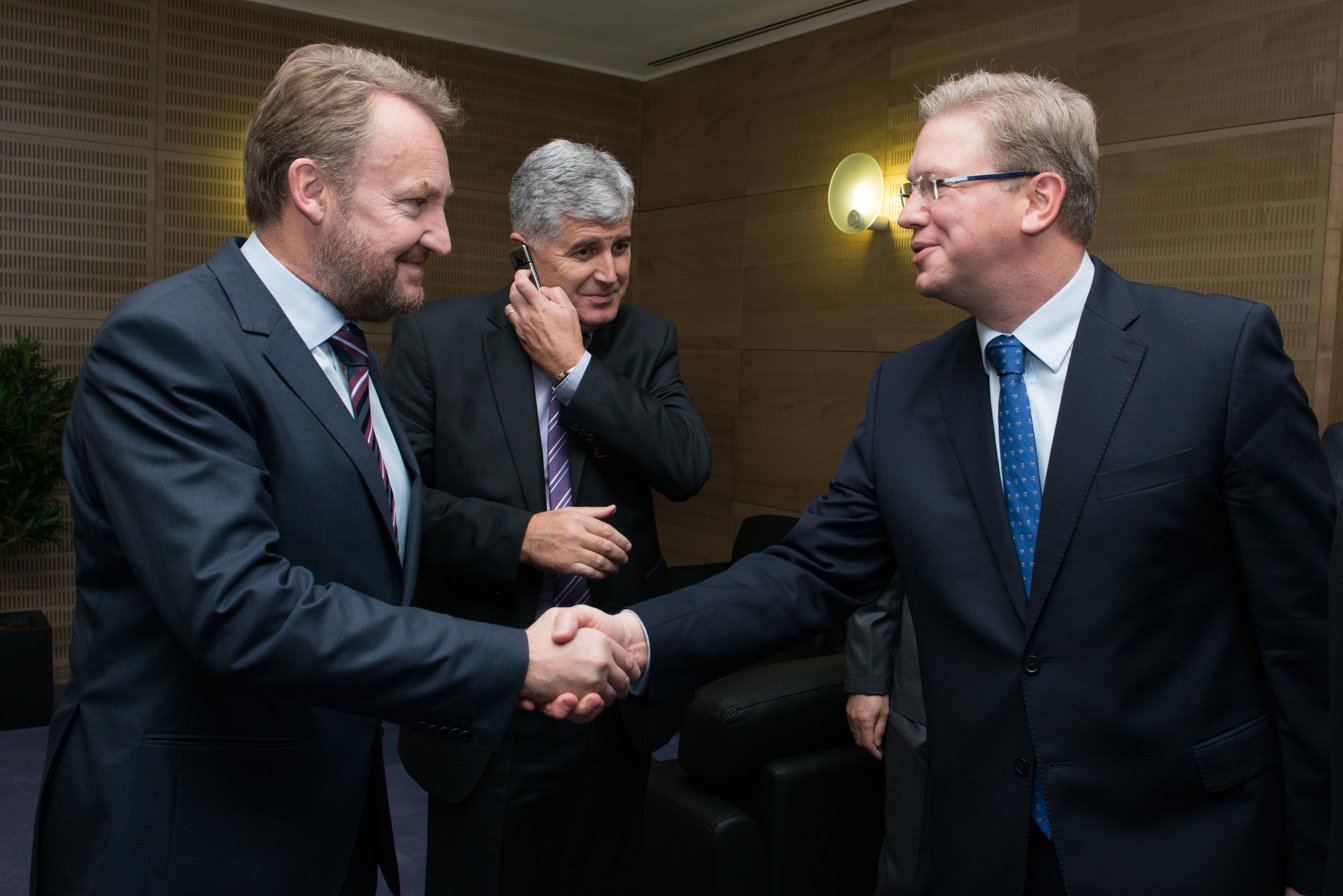
Izetbegović alongside Dragan Čović (middle) and European Commissioner for Enlargement Štefan Füle, 10 October 2013

As "credible efforts" towards the implementation of the Sejdić–Finci ruling remained the outstanding condition for the entry into force of the Stabilisation and Association Agreement, in June 2012, Czech Commissioner Štefan Füle launched a High Level Dialogue on the Accession Process (HLAD) with Bosnia and Herzegovina, tackling both the Sejdić–Finci issue and the need for a coordination mechanism for the country to speak with a single voice in the accession process. Talks were held in June and November 2012, with little success.

In February 2013, the European Commission decided to step up its involvement, with the direct facilitation of talks by Füle, in coordination with the Council of Europe's Secretary-General Thorbjørn Jagland. In March and April 2013, with the support of the Director-General for Enlargement Stefano Sannino, the EU Delegation in Sarajevo facilitated a series of direct talks between party leaders, with no concrete outcome.

During the summer of 2013, Croatian Democratic Union (HDZ BiH) leader Dragan Čović and Izetbegović reached a political agreement on several files, from Mostar to Sejdić–Finci, in parallel to the initiative led by the U.S. Embassy for a constitutional reform of the Federal entity. An agreement on principles on how to solve the Sejdić–Finci issue was signed by political leaders in Brussels on 1 October 2013, but it evaporated right after. Three further rounds of negotiations among political leaders were led together with Štefan Füle, in a castle near Prague in November 2013, and later in Sarajevo in the first months of 2014, also with the presence of the U.S. and the Venice Commission.

Despite high hopes, a solution could not be found, as the HDZ BiH required the absolute arithmetical certainty of being able to occupy the third seat of the Bosnian Presidency – which, given that the Sejdić–Finci ruling was actually about removing ethnic discrimination in the access to the same Presidency, could not be provided by any possible model. Talks were ended on 17 February 2014, while popular protests were ongoing in Sarajevo and in the rest of the country.

=== Foreign policy ===
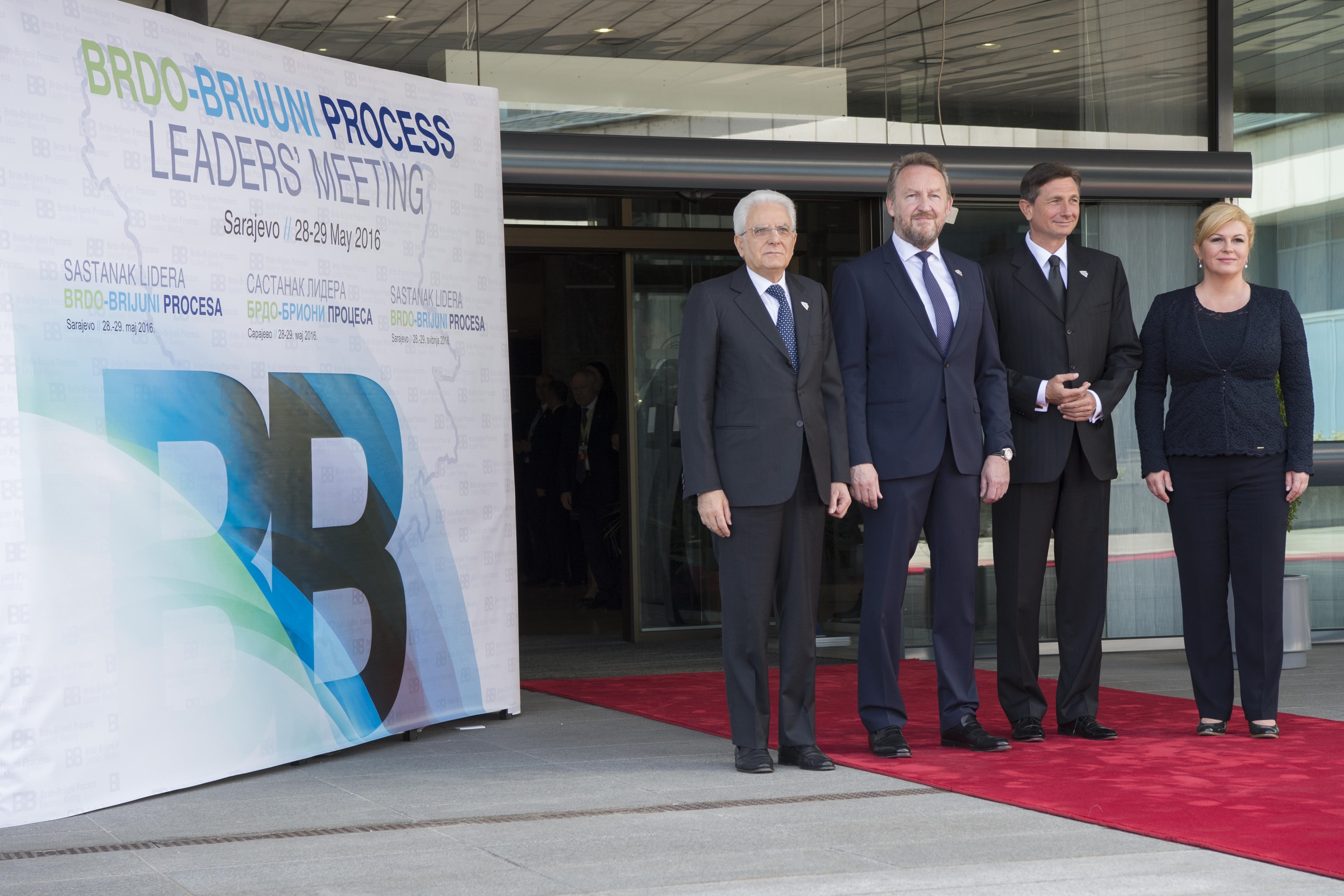
From left to right: Sergio Mattarella, Izetbegović, Borut Pahor and Kolinda Grabar-Kitarović at the Brdo-Brijuni Process summit in Sarajevo, 29 May 2016

In June 2012, Izetbegović criticized Serbian President Tomislav Nikolić for refusing to recognize the Srebrenica massacre as an act of genocide, saying it was an insult to the survivors. Even before criticizing Nikolić, Izetbegović, alongside the leaders of Croatia, Slovenia, and Macedonia, boycotted Nikolić's presidential inauguration due to his denial of the genocide in Srebrenica and claims about Vukovar, a Croatian city devastated during the Croatian War of Independence. Some time after, Nikolić apologised for crimes committed by any individual in the name of Serbia, and, in particular, for crimes committed in Srebrenica.

In October 2012, alongside other Presidency members, Izetbegović met with United States Secretary of State Hillary Clinton in Sarajevo. In July 2014, he stated that Gaza "was for many years a target of Israeli attacks" and warned that the world was "becoming used to violence perpetrated by Israel".

On 7 June 2015, Izetbegović met with Pope Francis in Sarajevo, as part of the Pope's 2015 papal visit to Bosnia and Herzegovina. In early 2017, Izetbegović met Egyptian members of the Muslim Brotherhood in the Building of the Presidency. In one of his last foreign visits as presidency member, Izetbegović participated at an EPP summit held in Sofia, Bulgaria in May 2018.

==== Relations with Turkey ====
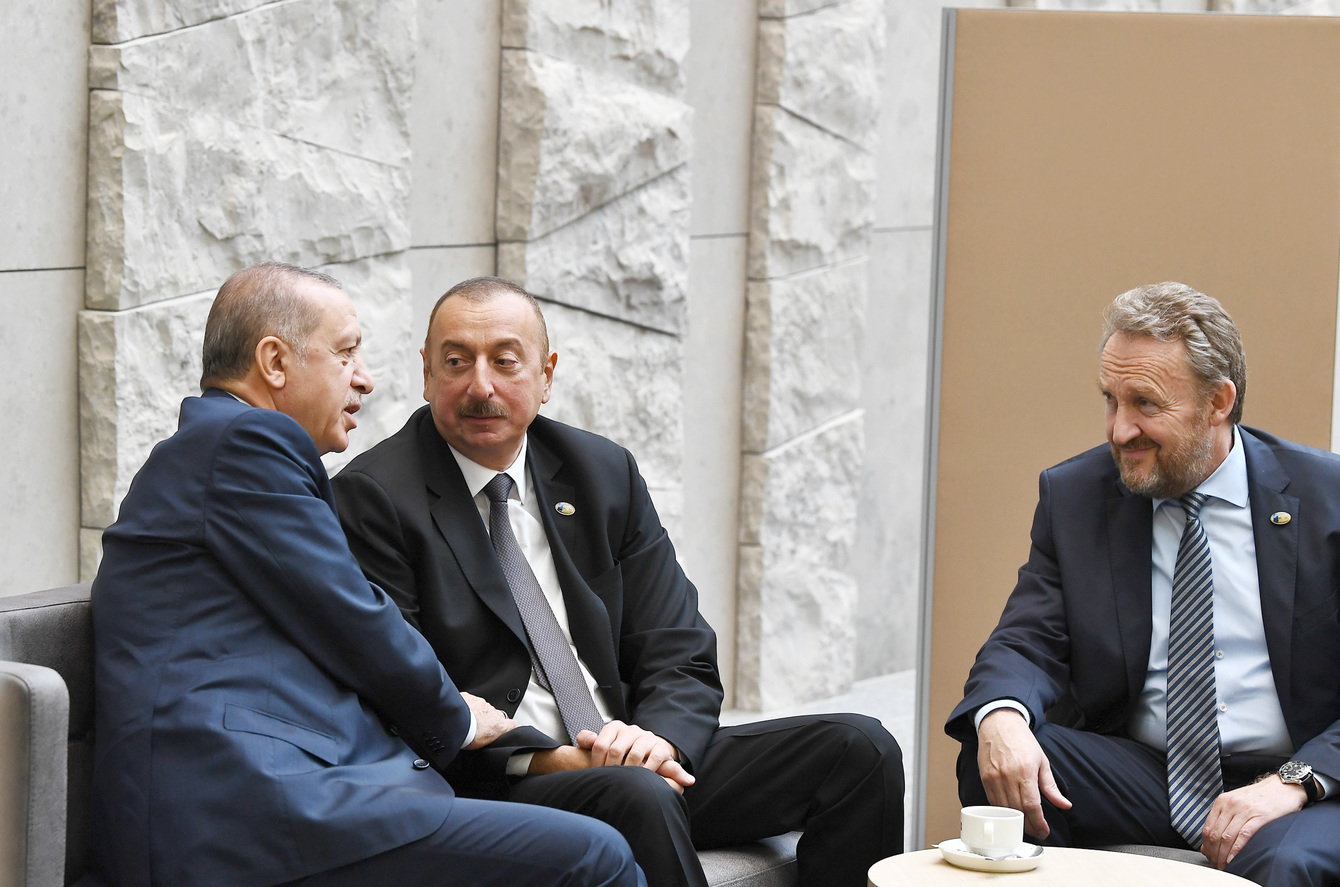
Izetbegović with Turkish President Recep Tayyip Erdoğan (left) and Azerbaijani president Ilham Aliyev, 12 July 2018

Due to strong bonds between the Bosnian region and the Ottoman Empire since the Ottoman conquest of the Balkans historically, a significant Turkish community as well as ties linking Bosnia and Turkey were established when Bosnia and Herzegovina fell under Ottoman rule.

In 2016, as part of a state project named "living languages and accents in Turkey", the Turkish government accepted the Bosnian language as a selective course for its schools and announced that classes would start in 2018, first being piloted in areas with people of Balkan origins such as the İzmir region.

In May 2018, Izetbegović said, some days before the visit of Turkish President Recep Tayyip Erdoğan in Bosnia and Herzegovina, that "Erdoğan is a mentor for the Muslims and this is the reason that the West doesn't like him."

The Turkish government has also assisted in the reconstruction of historic mosques which were destroyed during the Bosnian War, such as the Aladža Mosque in Foča and the Arnaudija Mosque in Banja Luka.

== Post-presidency (2018–present) ==
Shortly after having to leave the Presidency, due to the term limit of eight years, in February 2019, Izetbegović became a member of the national House of Peoples. On 28 February, he became the new chairman of the House of Peoples. He served as member of the House of Peoples until 16 February 2023. Izetbegović announced his candidacy in the Bosnian general election on 30 June 2022, running once again for presidency member, representing the Bosniaks. In the general election however, held on 2 October 2022, he was not elected, obtaining 37.25% of the vote, with Social Democratic Party candidate Denis Bećirović getting elected with 57.37% of the vote.

In May 2026, Izetbegović declared he was running for the Bosniak presidency member for a fourth time in the October 2026 general election. Ultimately, he once again failed to get elected, but this time with a far smaller margin as opposed to the 2022 election; the incumbent Bećirović won 38.10% of the vote, while Izetbegović earned 34.14%. Following the election, questions were raised about Izetbegović's personal popularity and future leadership of the SDA, as the party emerged as the largest individually, receiving more votes than Izetbegović.

== Controversies ==
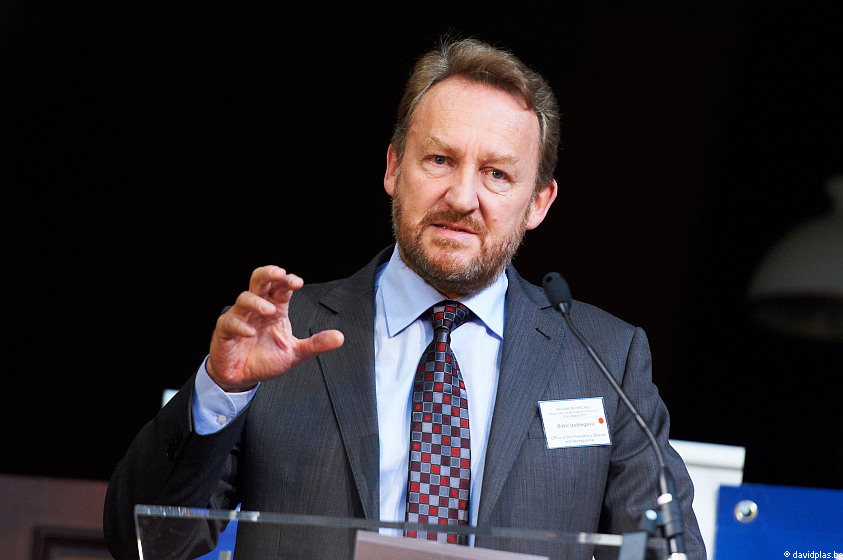
Izetbegović giving a speech, November 2011

Dževad Galijašević, a member of the Southeast European Expert Team for the Fight against Terrorism and Organized Crime, accused Izetbegović in 2011 of supporting and helping Wahhabis in Bosnia and Herzegovina.

In May 2018, Izetbegović allegedly said that Croats and Serbs "are fictional nations" and that "before, no one in Bosnia was called anything other than a Bošnjanin", continuing stating "Croats and Serbs originated from Bosniaks." In October 2019, while most of the world condemned it, Izetbegović supported the Turkish offensive into north-eastern Syria, saying "Turkey has the right to defend its security, territorial integrity and resolve the refugee issue."

In May 2020, Izetbegović was accused of being "an advocate of Sharia in Bosnia and Herzegovina", a religious law forming part of the Islamic tradition. In July 2021, he called Croatian President Zoran Milanović "arrogant" and said "Croatians will suffer because of his actions." This statement came after Milanović said that the Croats in Bosnia and Herzegovina were "being robbed."

The Prosecutor's Office of Bosnia and Herzegovina launched an investigation in June 2024 into Izetbegović, former Intelligence-Security Agency director Osman Mehmedagić and Kemal Ademović, after former intelligence agent Edin Garaplija accused them of being involved in a criminal organisation in 1996 that conducted politically-motivated murders. Garaplija was a witness for the trials of war criminals Radovan Karadžić and Ratko Mladić. The investigative case however, has currently been stalled by missing wartime intelligence archives and no significant advances in the investigation have been announced as of 2026.

== Personal life ==
Izetbegović has been married to Montenegrin Bosniak Sebija Građević since 1983, and they have a daughter, Jasmina, born in 1984. Jasmina, a graphic designer, is the owner of the marketing agency "FabCat Creative", which works primarily with state-owned enterprises like "Sarajevogas" and "Rad". On 27 August 2021, Jasmina got married in Sarajevo and her wedding was attended by Turkish President Recep Tayyip Erdoğan, who was also a godfather at the ceremony.

In the 2022 general election, Sebija was elected to the Sarajevo Canton Assembly as a member of the Party of Democratic Action. A gynecologist and former director of the Clinical Center of the University of Sarajevo, she faced major controversy in 2023 when the University of Sarajevo revoked her Master of Medicine degree from the School of Medicine, University of Zagreb. The revocation was due to insufficient proof of completing required exams and lacking a physical degree. Following this, her PhD in Medicine from the University of Sarajevo and her professorship at the Faculty of Medicine of Sarajevo were also rescinded. In August 2026, the Municipal Court in Sarajevo declared the University of Sarajevo's decision to annul her Master's degree to be unlawful.

== Notes ==
Political offices
Preceded by Haris Silajdžić	Bosniak member of the Presidency of Bosnia and Herzegovina; 2010–2018	Succeeded by Šefik Džaferović
Preceded by Željko Komšić	Chairman of the Presidency of Bosnia and Herzegovina; 2012	Succeeded by Nebojša Radmanović
Preceded by Željko Komšić	Chairman of the Presidency of Bosnia and Herzegovina; 2014	Succeeded by Mladen Ivanić
Preceded by Dragan Čović	Chairman of the Presidency of Bosnia and Herzegovina; 2016	Succeeded by Mladen Ivanić
Preceded by Dragan Čović	Chairman of the Presidency of Bosnia and Herzegovina; 2018	Succeeded by Milorad Dodik
