= Party of Democratic Action =

Bosniak political party

Party of Democratic Action Stranka demokratske akcije
- Abbreviation: SDA
- President: Bakir Izetbegović
- Secretary General: Halid Genjac
- Vice Presidents: See list: Fadil Novalić; Edin Ramić; Muamer Zukić; Haris Zahiragić; Aida Obuća; Ramiz Salkić; Šerif Špago; Mirsad Zaimović; Mirsad Mujić
- Founder: Alija Izetbegović
- Founded: 26 May 1990; 36 years ago
- Headquarters: Mehmeda Spahe 14, Sarajevo
- Youth wing: Youth Association SDA
- Ideology: Bosniak nationalism; Conservatism; Pro-Europeanism; Catch-all party; Muslim democracy; Political unitarism
- Political position: Centre-right to right-wing
- European affiliation: European People's Party (associate)
- International affiliation: International Democracy Union (formerly)
- Colours: Green
- Slogan: Izbor naroda! ('The people's choice!')
- Anthem: "Ja sin sam tvoj, zemljo" ('I am your son, oh land')
- HoP BiH: 2 / 15
- HoR BiH: 9 / 42
- HoP FBiH: 15 / 80
- HoR FBiH: 31 / 98
- NA RS: 1 / 83
- Cantonal Heads: 3 / 10
- Mayors: 33 / 145

Party flag

Website
- www.sda.ba

The Party of Democratic Action (Bosnian: Stranka demokratske akcije, SDA) is a Bosniak nationalist and conservative political party in Bosnia and Herzegovina. Founded in 1990 during the collapse of Yugoslavia, it quickly emerged as the principal political representative of Bosniaks and has remained one of the country’s most influential political parties.

The SDA played a central role during the Bosnian War of Independence (1992–1995), leading the government following Bosnia and Herzegovina’s declaration of independence. Under the leadership of its founder, Alija Izetbegović, the party coordinated political and military efforts, including the establishment of the Army of the Republic of Bosnia and Herzegovina. It was also deeply involved in diplomatic initiatives that culminated in the Dayton Agreement, which ended the genocide and war.

The party has traditionally been one of the dominant political forces among Bosniak voters and has participated in governments at the state level for much of the country’s post-independence history, including the periods 1996–2001, 2003–2012, and 2015–2023. Its influence has been even more pronounced at the Federation of Bosnia and Herzegovina level, where it participated in government predominantly during much of the period from 1996 to 2023. The SDA has also historically dominated the Bosniak seat in the tripartite Presidency of Bosnia and Herzegovina. Since independence, the position has generally been held by SDA candidates, with notable exceptions including Haris Silajdžić, who served from 2006 to 2010, and Denis Bećirović, who has served since 2022.

The SDA is an associate member of the European People's Party (EPP).

== History ==
The Party of Democratic Action was officially established on 26 May 1990 in Sarajevo. It was initially conceived as a “party of the Muslim cultural-historical circle,” reflecting the identity of Bosniaks (then referred to as Muslims in an ethnic sense). The party’s founding was closely tied to the vision of Alija Izetbegović, who became its first president.

At its inception, the SDA brought together a diverse range of 40 political and intellectual figures. These included religiously oriented nationalists such as Omer Behmen and more secular or left-leaning figures like Adil Zulfikarpašić. Izetbegović played a mediating role between these factions, shaping the party into a broad umbrella movement rather than a strictly ideological organization.

The party’s historical roots can be traced further back to earlier Muslim political organizations in the Balkans. These include the Yugoslav Muslim Organization, a conservative party active in the Kingdom of Yugoslavia, and its predecessor, the Muslim People's Organization, founded in 1906 during the Austro-Hungarian period. Even earlier influences include the “Movement for Waqf and Educational Autonomy” of the late 19th century, which advocated for religious and educational rights for Muslims under imperial rule.

During the first multi-party elections in Bosnia and Herzegovina in 1990, the SDA achieved significant success, becoming one of the leading political forces. Throughout the 1990s, particularly during the Bosnian War, the party dominated Bosniak political representation and played a central role in the country’s leadership. It also established media outlets such as the newspaper Ljiljan.

In November 2000, the SDA experienced its first major electoral defeat, losing power to a coalition known as the “Alliance for Change,” led by the Social Democratic Party. This marked the first time the party entered opposition. However, it later returned to government coalitions. Following the 2022 general elections, the SDA once again emerged as the largest single party in the country, reaffirming its enduring influence.

The SDA has faced recurring allegations of corruption and political patronage. Several senior figures have been implicated in scandals, including former Federation prime minister Fadil Novalić, who was sentenced to prison, and party official Asim Sarajlić, who resigned from positions following corruption allegations.

== Ideology ==
The SDA is widely regarded as a centre-right party, with strong support among conservative and nationalist segments of the Bosniak population. While the party has sometimes been associated with Muslim political thought, it generally presents itself as moderate and largely secularist.

Politically, the SDA advocates for a stronger and more centralized unitary state structure in Bosnia and Herzegovina, often opposing decentralization efforts that could weaken central institutions. On foreign policy, the party is strongly atlanticist, supporting closer ties with the NATO and membership in the European Union.

== International presence ==
The SDA has extended its organizational structure beyond Bosnia and Herzegovina, establishing sister-parties in neighboring countries such as Croatia, Slovenia, North Macedonia, Kosovo, and Serbia (particularly in the Sandžak region). These branches aim to represent and advocate for the interests of Bosniak and other Muslim South Slavic communities across the Balkans.

In Montenegro, the SDA merged with smaller parties to form the Bosniak Party, which continues to represent Bosniak interests there. The party has also established a diaspora presence, including a branch in St. Louis, Missouri, reflecting the large Bosnian community in that area.

== List of presidents ==
Name		Term of Office
1	Alija Izetbegović	1990–2001
2	Sulejman Tihić	2001–2014
3	Bakir Izetbegović	2014–present

== Election results ==
=== Parliamentary Assembly of Bosnia and Herzegovina ===
Assembly of the Socialist Republic of Bosnia and Herzegovina
Year	Leader	#	Popular vote	%	Seats won	Government
1990	Alija Izetbegović	1st	711,075	31.48	86 / 240	Coalition

Parliamentary Assembly of Bosnia and Herzegovina
Year	Leader	#	Popular vote	%	HoR	Seat change	HoP	Seat change	Government
1996	Alija Izetbegović	1st	909,970	37.92	19 / 42	New	5 / 15	New	Coalition
1998 (Note: Run as part of the Coalition for Unity and Democracy (SDA, SBiH, LS and GDS).)	Alija Izetbegović	1st	583,895	33.83	13 / 42	▼6	3 / 15	▼2	Coalition
2000	Alija Izetbegović	1st	279,548	18.76	8 / 42	▼5	2 / 15	▼1	Opposition
2002	Sulejman Tihić	1st	269,427	21.92	10 / 42	▲2	4 / 15	▲2	Coalition
2006	Sulejman Tihić	2nd	238,475	16.89	9 / 42	▼1	3 / 15	▼1	Coalition
2010	Sulejman Tihić	3rd	214,300	13.05	7 / 42	▼2	3 / 15	0	Coalition (2010–2012)
2010	Sulejman Tihić	3rd	214,300	13.05	7 / 42	▼2	3 / 15	0	Opposition (2012–2014)
2014	Bakir Izetbegović	1st	305,715	18.73	10 / 42	▲3	3 / 15	0	Coalition
2018	Bakir Izetbegović	1st	281,754	17.01	9 / 42	▼1	3 / 15	0	Coalition
2022	Bakir Izetbegović	1st	273,545	17.23	9 / 42	0	2 / 15	▼1	Opposition
2026	Bakir Izetbegović	1st	266,930	19.72	9 / 42	0	TBD	TBD	TBD

=== Parliament of the Federation of Bosnia and Herzegovina ===
Parliament of the Federation of Bosnia and Herzegovina
Year	Leader	#	Popular vote	%	HoR	Seat change	HoP	Seat change	Government
1996	Alija Izetbegović	1st	725,810	54.34	78 / 140	New	27 / 65	New	Coalition
1998	Alija Izetbegović	1st	456,458	49.20	68 / 140	▼10	26 / 72	▼1	Coalition
2000	Alija Izetbegović	1st	232,674	26.81	38 / 140	▼30	11 / 81	▼15	Opposition
2002	Sulejman Tihić	1st	234,923	33.57	32 / 98	▼6	11 / 58	Steady	Coalition
2006	Sulejman Tihić	1st	218,365	25.45	28 / 98	▼4	9 / 58	▼2	Coalition
2010	Sulejman Tihić	2nd	206,926	20.22	23 / 98	▼5	9 / 58	Steady	Coalition
2014	Bakir Izetbegović	1st	275,728	27.79	29 / 98	▲6	10 / 58	▲1	Coalition
2018	Bakir Izetbegović	1st	252,817	25.25	27 / 98	▼2	9 / 58	▼1	Coalition
2022	Bakir Izetbegović	1st	238,111	24.40	26 / 98	▼1	13 / 80	▲4	Opposition
2026	Bakir Izetbegović	1st	248,831	30.46	31 / 98	▲5	TBD	TBD	TBD

=== Presidency elections ===
Presidency of Bosnia and Herzegovina
Election year	#	Candidate	Votes	%	Representing	Elected?
1996	1st	Alija Izetbegović	730,592	80.0%	Bosniaks	Yes
1998	1st	Alija Izetbegović	511,541	86.8%	Bosniaks	Yes
2002	1st	Sulejman Tihić	192,661	37.2%	Bosniaks	Yes
2006	2nd	Sulejman Tihić	153,683	27.5%	Bosniaks	No
2010	1st	Bakir Izetbegović	162,831	34.8%	Bosniaks	Yes
2014	1st	Bakir Izetbegović	247,235	32.8%	Bosniaks	Yes
2018	1st	Šefik Džaferović	212,581	36.6%	Bosniaks	Yes
2022	2nd	Bakir Izetbegović	214,412	37.3%	Bosniaks	No
2026	2nd	Bakir Izetbegović	199,337	34.1%	Bosniaks	No

=== Cantonal elections ===
Cantonal election	Cantonal Assembly										
Cantonal election	Una-Sana	Posavina	Tuzla	Zenica-Doboj	Bosnian Podrinje Goražde	Central Bosnia	Herzegovina-Neretva	West Herzegovina	Sarajevo	Canton 10	Total won / Total contested
1996	39 / 50	3 / 20	33 / 50	40 / 59	26 / 31	29 / 55	19 / 50	0 / 31	28 / 45	2 / 15	219 / 406
1998	33 / 50	5 / 30	26 / 50	29 / 50	21 / 31	22 / 50	18 / 50	0 / 31	25 / 45	4 / 30	183 / 417
2000	13 / 30	2 / 19	12 / 35	13 / 35	8 / 25	8 / 28	5 / 28	0 / 21	8 / 35	2 / 23	71 / 279
2002	14 / 30	2 / 21	16 / 35	20 / 35	12 / 25	10 / 30	7 / 30	0 / 23	15 / 35	2 / 25	98 / 289
2006	12 / 30	2 / 21	12 / 35	13 / 35	9 / 25	8 / 30	6 / 30	0 / 23	10 / 35	2 / 25	74 / 289
2010	7 / 30	2 / 21	10 / 35	10 / 35	6 / 25	6 / 30	5 / 30	0 / 23	7 / 35	2 / 25	55 / 289
2014	10 / 30	3 / 21	13 / 35	11 / 35	6 / 25	8 / 30	7 / 30	0 / 23	10 / 35	2 / 25	70 / 289
2018	9 / 30	2 / 21	9 / 35	11 / 35	5 / 25	10 / 30	8 / 30	0 / 23	10 / 35	2 / 25	66 / 289
2022	8 / 30	3 / 21	13 / 35	11 / 35	5 / 25	11 / 30	7 / 30	0 / 23	7 / 35	2 / 25	67 / 289
2026	10 / 30	3 / 21	14 / 35	15 / 35	4 / 25	11 / 30	8 / 30	0 / 23	9 / 35	1 / 25	75 / 289

== See also ==
- Elections in the Party of Democratic Action

== Bibliography ==
- Babić, Marko (2014). Milosevic, Marko; Rekawek, Kacper (eds.). Perseverance of Terrorism: Focus on Leaders. Amsterdam: IOS Press. ISBN 9781614993872.
- Eralp, Doğa Ulaş (2012). Politics of the European Union in Bosnia-Herzegovina: Between Conflict and Democracy. Lanham, MD: Lexington Books. ISBN 9780739149478.
- Farmer, Brian R. (2010). Radical Islam in the West: Ideology and Challenge. Jefferson, North Carolina: McFarland. ISBN 9780786462100.
- Krieger, Joel (2012). The Oxford Companion to Comparative Politics. Oxford: Oxford University Press. ISBN 9780199738595.
- Perica, Vjekoslav (2004). Balkan Idols: Religion and Nationalism in Yugoslav States. Oxford: Oxford University Press. ISBN 9780195174298.
- Šedo, Jakub (2013). "The party system of Bosnia and Herzegovina". In Stojarová, Vera; Emerson, Peter (eds.). Party Politics in the Western Balkans. New York: Routledge. ISBN 9781135235857.
- Tottoli, Roberto (2014). Routledge Handbook of Islam in the West. London: Routledge. ISBN 9781317744023.
