= List of heads of government of Bosnia and Herzegovina =

This article lists the heads of government of Bosnia and Herzegovina since the country was formalized as the Federal State of Bosnia and Herzegovina, a constituent unit of the Democratic Federal Yugoslavia, in April 1945.

Since 1945, the heads of government have received several titles, such as:

- Prime Minister (1945–1953)
- President of the Executive Council (1953–1992)
- Prime Minister (1992–1997)
- Chairman of the Council of Ministers (1997–present).

Following the Bosnian War, from 3 January 1997 to 6 June 2000, the office of head of government was shared by two members, one each from the Federation of Bosnia and Herzegovina and Republika Srpska.

== List of officeholders ==
=== Socialist Republic of Bosnia and Herzegovina (1945–1992) ===
Communist Party / League of Communists
Croatian Democratic Union

No.	Portrait	Name (Birth–Death)	Term of office			Party	Election
No.	Portrait	Name (Birth–Death)	Took office	Left office	Time in office	Party	Election
Prime Minister of PR Bosnia and Herzegovina
1		Rodoljub Čolaković (1900–1983)	27 April 1945	September 1948	3 years, 4 months	KP BiH	—
2		Đuro Pucar (1899–1979)	September 1948	March 1953	4 years, 6 months	KP BiH renamed in 1952 to SK BiH	—
President of the Executive Council of SR Bosnia and Herzegovina
(2)		Đuro Pucar (1899–1979)	September 1948	March 1953	4 years, 6 months	SK BiH	—
3		Avdo Humo (1914–1983)	December 1953	1956	c. 3 years	SK BiH	—
4		Osman Karabegović (1911–1996)	1956	1963	7 years	SK BiH	—
5		Hasan Brkić (1913–1965)	1963	14 June 1965	c. 2 years	SK BiH	—
6		Rudi Kolak (1918–2004)	14 June 1965	1967	c. 2 years	SK BiH	—
7		Branko Mikulić (1928–1994)	1967	1969	2 years	SK BiH	—
8		Dragutin Kosovac (1924–2012)	1969	April 1974	c. 5 years	SK BiH	—
9		Milanko Renovica (1928–2013)	April 1974	28 April 1982	8 years	SK BiH	—
10		Seid Maglajlija (1940–2019)	28 April 1982	28 April 1984	2 years	SK BiH	—
11		Gojko Ubiparip (1927–2000)	28 April 1984	April 1986	0 months	SK BiH	—
12		Josip Lovrenović (1929–2005)	April 1986	April 1988	2 years	SK BiH	—
13		Marko Ćeranić	April 1988	20 December 1990	2 years, 8 months	SK BiH	—
14		Jure Pelivan (1928–2014)	20 December 1990	3 March 1992	1 year, 72 days	HDZ BiH	1990

=== Since independence (1992–present) ===
==== Prime Minister of the Republic of Bosnia and Herzegovina (1992–1997) ====
Croatian Democratic Union
Party of Democratic Action

Portrait	Name (Birth–Death)	Ethnicity	Term of office			Party	Election
Portrait	Name (Birth–Death)	Ethnicity	Took office	Left office	Time in office	Party	Election
	Jure Pelivan (1928–2014)	Croat	3 March 1992	9 November 1992 (Resigned)	251 days	HDZ BiH	—
	Mile Akmadžić (born 1939)	Croat	9 November 1992	25 October 1993	350 days	HDZ BiH	—
	Haris Silajdžić (born 1945)	Bosniak	25 October 1993	30 January 1996	2 years, 97 days	SDA	—
	Hasan Muratović (1940–2020)	Bosniak	30 January 1996	3 January 1997	339 days	SDA	—

==== Co-Chairmen of the Council of Ministers of Bosnia and Herzegovina (1997–2000) ====
Party for Bosnia and Herzegovina
Serb Democratic Party
Socialist Party

Portrait	Name (Birth–Death)	Ethnicity	Term of office			Party	Government	Composition	Election
Portrait	Name (Birth–Death)	Ethnicity	Took office	Left office	Time in office	Party	Government	Composition	Election
	Haris Silajdžić (born 1945)	Bosniak	3 January 1997	3 February 1999	2 years, 31 days	SBiH	Silajdžić–Bosić	SDA–SDS–HDZ BiH–SBiH	1996
	Boro Bosić (born 1950)	Serb	3 January 1997	3 February 1999	2 years, 31 days	SDS	Silajdžić–Bosić	SDA–SDS–HDZ BiH–SBiH	1996
	Haris Silajdžić (born 1945)	Bosniak	3 February 1999	6 June 2000	1 year, 124 days	SBiH	Silajdžić–Mihajlović	SDA–SBiH–SP–SNSD–HDZ BiH	1998
	Svetozar Mihajlović (born 1949)	Serb	3 February 1999	6 June 2000	1 year, 124 days	SP	Silajdžić–Mihajlović	SDA–SBiH–SP–SNSD–HDZ BiH	1998

==== Chairman of the Council of Ministers of Bosnia and Herzegovina (2000–present) ====
Serb Democratic Party
Croatian Democratic Union
Social Democratic Party
Party of Democratic Progress
Party of Democratic Action
Alliance of Independent Social Democrats

Portrait	Name (Birth–Death)	Ethnicity	Term of office			Party	Government	Composition	Election
Portrait	Name (Birth–Death)	Ethnicity	Took office	Left office	Time in office	Party	Government	Composition	Election
	Spasoje Tuševljak (born 1952)	Serb	6 June 2000	18 October 2000	134 days	SDS	Tuševljak	SDA–SP–HDZ BiH–SDS	—
	Martin Raguž (born 1958)	Croat	18 October 2000	22 February 2001	127 days	HDZ BiH	Raguž	SDA–SP–HDZ BiH–SDS	—
	Božidar Matić (1937–2016)	Croat	22 February 2001	18 July 2001	146 days	SDP BiH	Matić	SDP BiH–SBiH–PDP–SP–NHI	2000
	Zlatko Lagumdžija (born 1955)	Bosniak	18 July 2001	15 March 2002	240 days	SDP BiH	Lagumdžija	SDP BiH–SBiH–PDP–SP–NHI	—
	Dragan Mikerević (born 1955)	Serb	15 March 2002	23 December 2002	283 days	PDP	Mikerević	SDP BiH–SBiH–PDP–SP–NHI	—
	Adnan Terzić (born 1960)	Bosniak	23 December 2002	11 January 2007	4 years, 19 days	SDA	Terzić	SDA–SDS–SBiH–HDZ BiH–PDP	2002
	Nikola Špirić (born 1956)	Serb	11 January 2007	20 February 2008	5 years, 1 day	SNSD	Špirić I	SNSD–SDA–SBiH–HDZ BiH–HDZ 1990	2006
	Nikola Špirić (born 1956)	Serb	20 February 2008	12 January 2012	5 years, 1 day	SNSD	Špirić II	SNSD–SDA–SBiH–HDZ BiH–HDZ 1990	—
	Vjekoslav Bevanda (born 1956)	Croat	12 January 2012	31 March 2015	3 years, 78 days	HDZ BiH	Bevanda	SDP BiH–SNSD–HDZ BiH–HDZ 1990	2010
	Denis Zvizdić (born 1964)	Bosniak	31 March 2015	23 December 2019	4 years, 267 days	SDA	Zvizdić	SDA–SDS–SBB–HDZ BiH–PDP	2014
	Zoran Tegeltija (born 1961)	Serb	23 December 2019	25 January 2023	3 years, 33 days	SNSD	Tegeltija	SDA–SNSD–HDZ BiH–DF–DNS	2018
	Borjana Krišto (born 1961)	Croat	25 January 2023	Incumbent	3 years, 296 days	HDZ BiH	Krišto	SNSD–HDZ BiH–SDP BiH–NiP–NS–DNS–BHZ	2022

== See also ==
- Chairman of the Council of Ministers of Bosnia and Herzegovina
- List of members of the Presidency of Bosnia and Herzegovina
- List of members of the Presidency by time in office
