= Fuad Kasumović =

Bosnian politician, economist and businessman (born 1958)

Mayor of Zenica
- Incumbent
- Assumed office 10 November 2016
- Preceded by: Husejin Smajlović

Deputy Minister of Finance and Treasury
- In office 11 January 2007 – 30 October 2012
- Minister: Dragan Vrankić; Nikola Špirić
- Preceded by: Jusuf Kumalić
- Succeeded by: Edita Đapo

Personal details
- Born: 20 March 1958 (age 68) Gornji Vakuf, PR Bosnia and Herzegovina, FPR Yugoslavia
- Party: BHI KF (2022–present)
- Other political affiliations: SDA (1990–2016); NB (2017–2019); Independent (2016, 2019–2022)
- Spouse: Mersija Kasumović
- Children: 1
- Education: University of Sarajevo (BEc)
- Awards: Order of the Golden Lily

Fuad Kasumović (Serbo-Croatian Cyrillic: Фуад Касумовић; born 20 March 1958) is a Bosnian politician, economist and businessman serving as mayor of Zenica since November 2016. He previously served as deputy Minister of Finance and Treasury from 2007 to 2012.

Kasumović is the founder and president of the Bosnian-Herzegovinian Initiative, having previously been a founding member of the Independent Bloc. Prior to forming the Independent Bloc in 2017, Kasumović was a member of the Party of Democratic Action from 1990 until 2016.

== Early life and education ==
Kasumović was born on 20 March 1958 in Gornji Vakuf. After graduating from the School of Economics and Business at the University of Sarajevo in 1987, he was employed at Coal Mine "Gračanica" in his hometown, and soon became CFO of the company. He worked at the mine until the start of the Bosnian War in 1992. During the war, he was a member of Army of the Republic of Bosnia and Herzegovina and was awarded its highest recognition, the Order of the Golden Lily, and upon his graduation he obtained a job in the Ministry of Dedicated Production in the Government of the Republic of Bosnia and Herzegovina.

== Political career ==
Kasumović joined the Party of Democratic Action (SDA) in 1990. He began his political career in 1996 as Minister of Finance in the Central Bosnia Canton (SBK). Prior to the end of his term in the office, he was appointed deputy director of the Customs Administration of the Federation of Bosnia and Herzegovina in July 1998. Following his removal from office in 2001, he remained in the Customs Administration for two more years as a financial advisor. Following the establishment of the Indirect Taxation Authority of Bosnia and Herzegovina in 2004, Kasumović was appointed as an advisor to the director for International Cooperation. He remained in this post until his termination in 2007. Following the 2006 general election and the formation of a new cabinet, he was appointed deputy Minister of Finance and Treasury in the Council of Ministers in January 2007.

Kasumović ran in the 2010 general election, but failed to enter the national House of Representatives. Following the election, he remained as deputy minister in the Bevanda cabinet, but was removed from office in October 2012 due to the SDA's departure from the ruling state-level coalition. In the 2016 municipal elections, Kasumović was elected mayor of Zenica as an independent candidate after leaving the SDA; Subsequently, he participated in the founding of the Independent Bloc in September 2017. He left the party in April 2019.

Kasumović was re-elected as mayor of Zenica by a three-to-one margin in the 2020 municipal elections. In February 2022, he founded the Bosnian-Herzegovinian Initiative. In the 2024 municipal elections, he was re-elected as mayor to a third term, obtaining a plurality of 45.34% of the vote.

== Legal issues ==
The Prosecutor's Office of Sarajevo Canton charged Kasumović with malpractice because he, as a director of the Federal Customs Administration, signed a transfer order for 69,000 KM to the Tuzla customs office for material costs and lease of premises. However, the money was used to buy a flat of an officer of the Administration. After a five-year trial, Kasumović was acquitted. In 2008, the Central Election Commission submitted a report against Kasumović to the Prosecutor's Office of Bosnia and Herzegovina on suspicion that he did not report all of his assets in the 2007 property file. Kasumović told reporters that no one had contacted him about the issue. Kasumović also said that he had not been contacted in connection with the allegations made against him by the Federal Financial Police. In 2003, this police institution submitted a report to the Prosecutor's Office of Central Bosnia Canton, in which Kasumović was suspected of having paid himself and other officials of the Federal Customs Administration financial compensation for a non-existent separate life.

On 1 December 2021, Kasumović was taken into SIPA-custody as part of an investigation into fraud related to the transport company "Zenicatrans"; the month-planned detention in Zenica prison was discontinued after nine days. Kasumović's trial began in July 2022. In September 2025, he was sentenced by the first-instance court to four years imprisonment and a six-year ban from holding the office of mayor for organized crime.

== Personal life ==
Kasumović and his wife Mersija, who is also a politician, have one child. The family owns three business offices, including a petrol station in Zenica of which price Kasumović holds over a half a million KM value. He was president of Čelik Zenica briefly in 2010.

On 26 October 2020, it was confirmed that he tested positive for COVID-19, amid its pandemic in Bosnia and Herzegovina. On 31 March 2021, Kasumović received a dose of the Pfizer anti-COVID vaccine.

Political offices
Preceded by Husejin Smajlović	Mayor of Zenica; 2016–present	Incumbent
