= Cabinet of Nikola Špirić II =

Second Špirić cabinet
- 10th Cabinet of Bosnia and Herzegovina
- 2008–2012
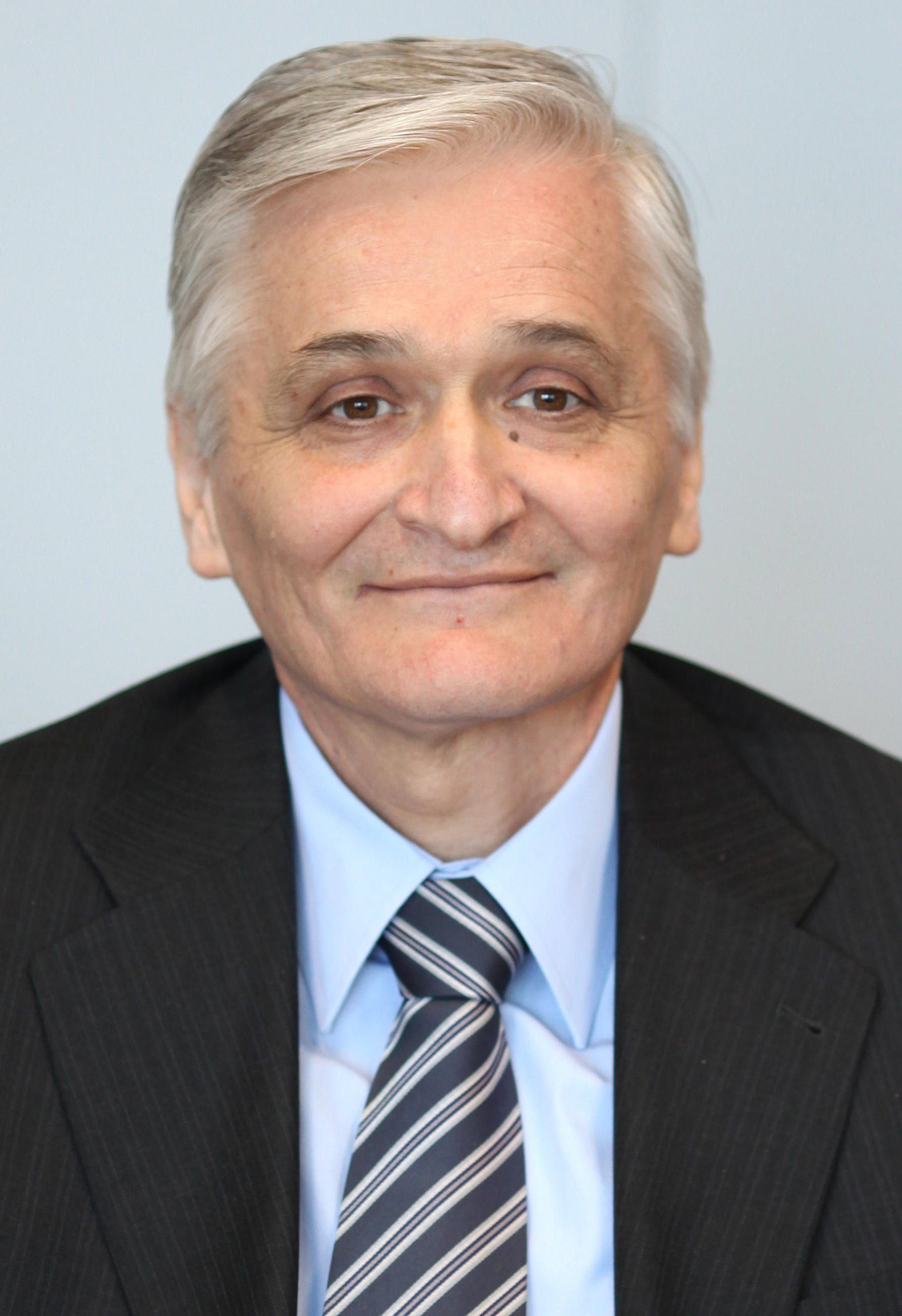
- Date formed: 20 February 2008
- Date dissolved: 12 January 2012

People and organisations
- Head of state: Presidency List: Haris Silajdžić; Nebojša Radmanović; Željko Komšić
- Head of government: Nikola Špirić
- Deputy head of government: Dragan Vrankić; Sadik Ahmetović
- No. of ministers: 9
- Total no. of members: 10
- Member parties: Alliance of Independent Social Democrats; Croatian Democratic Union; Party of Democratic Action; Party for Bosnia and Herzegovina; Croatian Democratic Union 1990
- Status in legislature: Majority coalition government

History
- Legislature term: 2006–2010
- Predecessor: Cabinet of Nikola Špirić I
- Successor: Cabinet of Vjekoslav Bevanda

The Tenth Council of Ministers of Bosnia and Herzegovina (Bosnian and Croatian: Deseti saziv Vijeća ministara Bosne i Hercegovine, Serbian: Десети сазив Савјета министара Босне и Херцеговине / Deseti saziv Savjeta ministara Bosne i Hercegovine) was the Council of Ministers of Bosnia and Herzegovina cabinet formed on 20 February 2008, following the resignation and later reappointment of Nikola Špirić. It was led by Chairman of the Council of Ministers Nikola Špirić. The cabinet was dissolved on 12 January 2012 and was succeeded by a new Council of Ministers presided over by Vjekoslav Bevanda.

== Investiture ==
Investiture; Nikola Špirić (SNSD)
Ballot →	20 February 2008
Required majority →	22 out of 42
Yes	28 / 42
No	8 / 42
Abstentions	1 / 42
Absentees	5 / 42

== History ==
The Second Špirić cabinet was formed on 20 February 2008, following the resignation and later reappointment of Nikola Špirić. On 1 November 2007, Špirić tendered his resignation in protest of parliamentary reforms imposed by High Representative Miroslav Lajčák. Špirić felt that the reforms would reduce the influence of Bosnia's Serb population. The resignation was deemed by some to be the country's most serious crisis since the end of the Bosnian War.

After the crisis was resolved, he was renominated for the chairman's post on 10 December 2007, confirmed by the Presidency on 27 December 2007 and by Parliament a day later, on 28 December. With Špirić's reappointment, a new cabinet presided by Špirić was officially formed in February 2008, but with little change.

== Party breakdown ==
Party breakdown of cabinet ministers:

- Alliance of Independent Social Democrats
3
- Croatian Democratic Union
2
- Party of Democratic Action
2
- Party for Bosnia and Herzegovina
2
- Croatian Democratic Union 1990
1

== Cabinet members ==
The Cabinet was structured into the offices for the chairman of the Council of Ministers, the two vice chairs and 9 ministries.

← Špirić II Cabinet → (20 February 2008 – 12 January 2012)
Portfolio	Name	Party	Took office	Left office
Chairman of the Council of Ministers	Nikola Špirić	SNSD	20 February 2008	12 January 2012
Minister of Finance and Treasury; Vice Chairman of the Council of Ministers	Dragan Vrankić	HDZ BiH	20 February 2008	12 January 2012
Minister of Security; Vice Chairman of the Council of Ministers	Sadik Ahmetović	SDA	24 November 2009	12 January 2012
Minister of Foreign Affairs	Sven Alkalaj	SBiH	20 February 2008	12 January 2012
Minister of Foreign Trade and Economic Relations	Mladen Zirojević	SNSD	30 August 2008	12 January 2012
Minister of Defence	Selmo Cikotić	SDA	20 February 2008	12 January 2012
Minister of Justice	Bariša Čolak	HDZ BiH	20 February 2008	12 January 2012
Minister of Civil Affairs	Sredoje Nović	SNSD	20 February 2008	12 January 2012
Minister of Communication and Traffic	Rudo Vidović	HDZ 1990	23 June 2009	12 January 2012
Minister of Human Rights and Refugees	Safet Halilović	SBiH	20 February 2008	12 January 2012
