= Cabinet of Nikola Špirić I =

First Špirić cabinet
- 9th Cabinet of Bosnia and Herzegovina
- 2007–2008
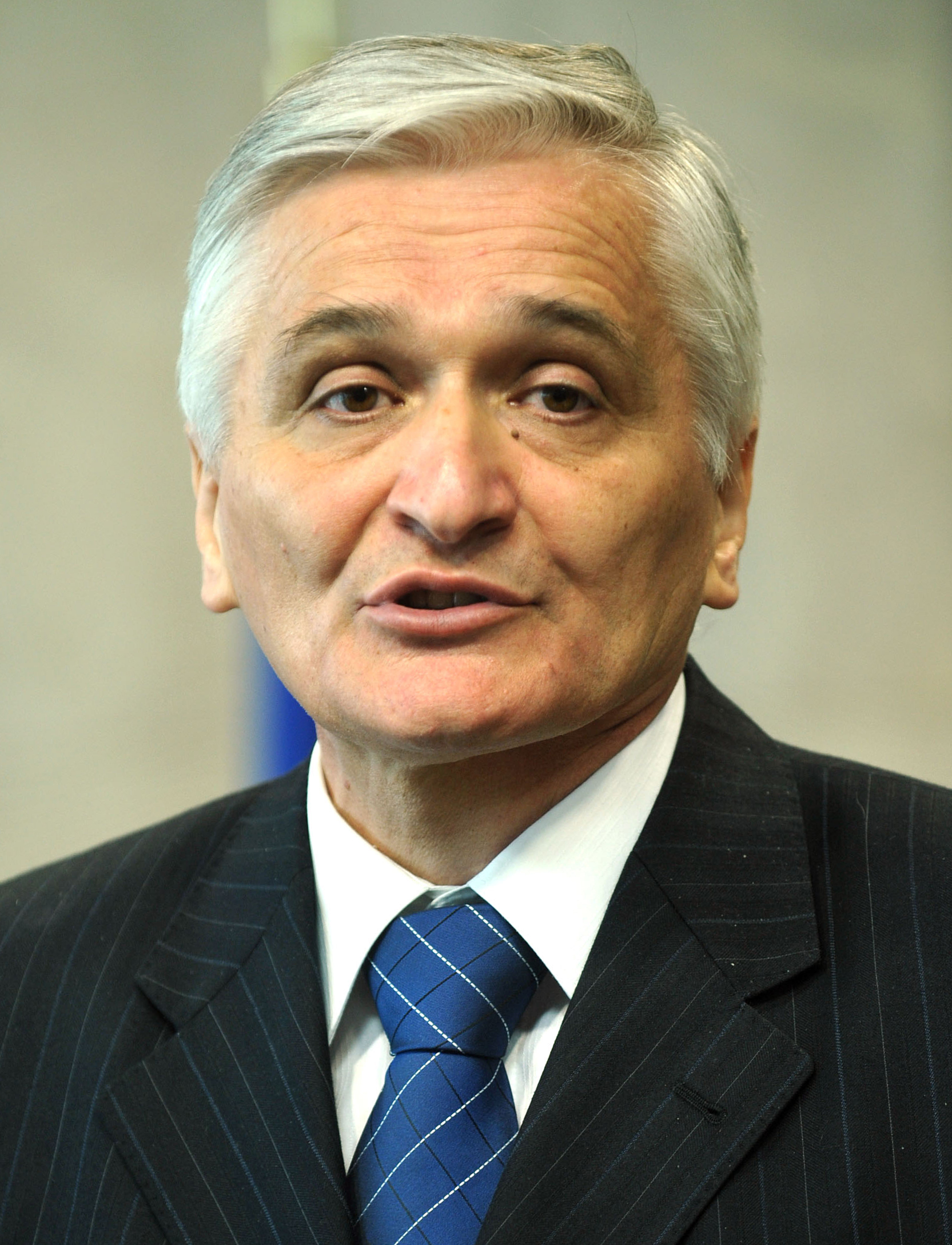
- Date formed: 11 January 2007
- Date dissolved: 20 February 2008

People and organisations
- Head of state: Presidency List: Haris Silajdžić; Nebojša Radmanović; Željko Komšić
- Head of government: Nikola Špirić
- Deputy head of government: Dragan Vrankić; Tarik Sadović
- No. of ministers: 9
- Total no. of members: 10
- Member parties: Alliance of Independent Social Democrats; Croatian Democratic Union; Party of Democratic Action; Party for Bosnia and Herzegovina; Croatian Democratic Union 1990
- Status in legislature: Majority coalition government

History
- Election: 2006 general election
- Legislature term: 2006–2010
- Predecessor: Cabinet of Adnan Terzić
- Successor: Cabinet of Nikola Špirić II

The Ninth Council of Ministers of Bosnia and Herzegovina (Bosnian and Croatian: Deveti saziv Vijeća ministara Bosne i Hercegovine, Serbian: Девети сазив Савјета министара Босне и Херцеговине / Deveti saziv Savjeta ministara Bosne i Hercegovine) was the Council of Ministers of Bosnia and Herzegovina cabinet formed on 11 January 2007, following the 2006 general election. It was led by Chairman of the Council of Ministers Nikola Špirić. The cabinet was dissolved on 20 February 2008 and was succeeded by a new Council of Ministers presided over by Špirić.

== History ==
The First Špirić cabinet was formed on 11 January 2007, following the 2006 general election. At the election, the Alliance of Independent Social Democrats (SNSD), of which Špirić is part of, won the most parliamentary seats in Republika Srpska, one of the two entities of Bosnia and Herzegovina, and the third most seats in the whole country with 46.9% of the vote. This secured the SNSD a part of a majority coalition government in the Council of Ministers.

Three months after the election, the new Council of Ministers was formed with Špirić presiding.

Ten months after the government's formation, on 1 November, Špirić tendered his resignation in protest of parliamentary reforms imposed by High Representative Miroslav Lajčák. Špirić felt that the reforms would reduce the influence of Bosnia's Serb population. The resignation was deemed by some to be the country's most serious crisis since the end of the Bosnian War. After the crisis was resolved, he was renominated for the chairman's post on 10 December 2007, confirmed by the Presidency on 27 December 2007 and by Parliament a day later, on 28 December. With Špirić's reappointment, a new cabinet presided by Špirić was officially formed in February 2008, but with little change.

== Party breakdown ==
Party breakdown of cabinet ministers:

- Alliance of Independent Social Democrats
3
- Croatian Democratic Union
2
- Party of Democratic Action
2
- Party for Bosnia and Herzegovina
2
- Croatian Democratic Union 1990
1

== Cabinet members ==
The Cabinet was structured into the offices for the chairman of the Council of Ministers, the two vice chairs and 9 ministries.

← Špirić I Cabinet → (11 January 2007 – 20 February 2008)
Portfolio	Name	Party	Took office	Left office
Chairman of the Council of Ministers	Nikola Špirić	SNSD	11 January 2007	20 February 2008
Minister of Finance and Treasury; Vice Chairman of the Council of Ministers	Dragan Vrankić	HDZ BiH	11 January 2007	20 February 2008
Minister of Security; Vice Chairman of the Council of Ministers	Tarik Sadović	SDA	11 January 2007	20 February 2008
Minister of Foreign Affairs	Sven Alkalaj	SBiH	11 January 2007	20 February 2008
Minister of Foreign Trade and Economic Relations	Slobodan Puhalac	SNSD	11 January 2007	20 February 2008
Minister of Defence	Selmo Cikotić	SDA	22 April 2007	20 February 2008
Minister of Justice	Bariša Čolak	HDZ BiH	11 January 2007	20 February 2008
Minister of Civil Affairs	Sredoje Nović	SNSD	11 January 2007	20 February 2008
Minister of Communication and Traffic	Božo Ljubić	HDZ 1990	11 January 2007	20 February 2008
Minister of Human Rights and Refugees	Safet Halilović	SBiH	11 January 2007	20 February 2008
