= Senad Šepić =

Bosnian politician (born 1977)

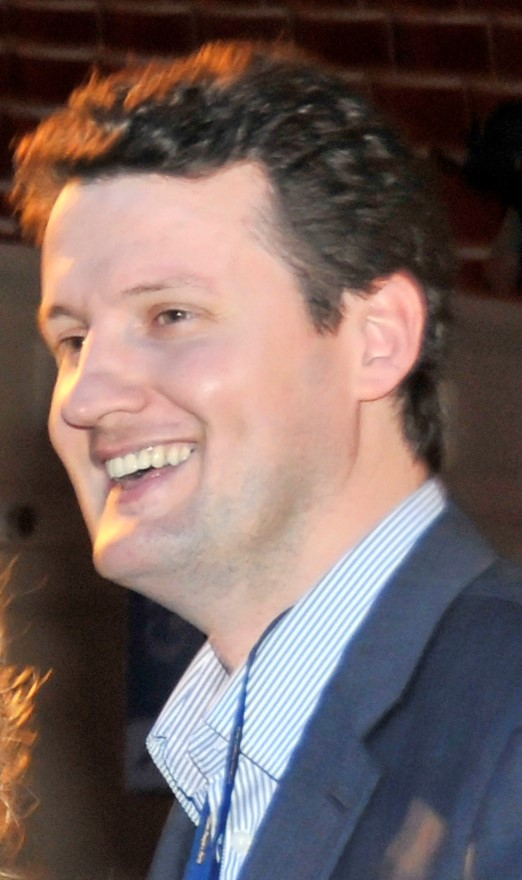
- Šepić in 2009

President of the Independent Bloc
- Incumbent
- Assumed office 9 September 2017
- Preceded by: Office established

Deputy Minister of Civil Affairs
- In office 26 March 2007 – 12 January 2012
- Minister: Sredoje Nović
- Preceded by: Zoran Tešanović
- Succeeded by: Denisa Sarajlić-Maglić
Parliamentary offices
Member of the House of Representatives
In office 12 January 2012 – 6 December 2018
Constituency	1st Electoral Unit
Member of the Federal House of Representatives
In office 4 December 2002 – 26 March 2007

Personal details
- Born: 24 December 1977 (age 48) Cazin, SR Bosnia and Herzegovina, SFR Yugoslavia
- Party: Independent Bloc (2017–present)
- Other political affiliations: Party of Democratic Action (1995–2017)
- Spouse: Lejla Šepić
- Children: 3
- Education: University of Sarajevo (BA, LLM)

Senad Šepić (born 24 December 1977) is a Bosnian politician who is the current president of the Independent Bloc. He served as member of the national House of Representatives from 2012 to 2018. A member of the Party of Democratic Action (SDA) since 1995, he left the party to form the Independent Bloc in 2017.

Šepić also served as member of the Federal House of Representatives from 2002 to 2007, and was the deputy Minister of Civil Affairs from 2007 until 2012.

== Personal life and early career ==
Šepić was born in Cazin, SR Bosnia and Herzegovina, then part of SFR Yugoslavia. In the early 2000s, he was president of the SDA's youth organization. Šepić's parliamentary biography indicates that he was a member of the Faculty of Philosophy at the University of Sarajevo from 1997 to 2003, working as a history teacher. His online biography indicates that he received a history degree from the university in 2003 and a Master of Law degree in 2012.

== Political career ==
Šepić was elected to the House of Representatives of the Federation of Bosnia and Herzegovina (one of the two entities that makes up the country Bosnia and Herzegovina) in the 2002 general election and was re-elected in 2006. He resigned his seat in 2007 when he was appointed as the country's Deputy minister of Civil affairs. His appointment was intended to provide Bosniak representation within the ministry, which was overseen by Minister of Civil Affairs Sredoje Nović.

In 2008, Bosnian prime minister Nikola Špirić sought to remove Šepić from office on the grounds that his father-in-law was the director of a utility company in Travnik. The state court subsequently ruled that Šepić was not in a conflict. Šepić was a candidate for security minister of Bosnia and Herzegovina in 2009, but withdrew his name prior to the vote.

He was elected to the House of Representatives of Bosnia and Herzegovina in the 2010 general election, winning a seat in the first electoral division of the Federation of Bosnia and Herzegovina. The Party of Democratic Action (SDA) won a single mandate for this division, and, as Šepić won more candidate preference votes than incumbent Husein Nanić, he was declared elected. He continued to serve as a deputy minister until 2012 and did not actually take his seat in parliament until standing down from this position. He was re-elected to the legislature in 2014.

=== Within the SDA ===
Šepić joined the presidency of the SDA in 2001 and was a party vice-chair from 2009 to 2015. For many years, he was regarded as a stalwart ally of party leader Sulejman Tihić and a supporter of Tihić's bid to move the party in a centrist direction less dependent on religious identity. A January 2012 news report, however, describes him as having by this time fallen into Tihić's bad graces and as being aligned with Bakir Izetbegović's rival faction. Prior to the 2014 elections, Šepić openly announced that he had joined "Izetbegović's ranks." There was some speculation after the election that he could be appointed to cabinet as minister of civil affairs, but this did not occur.

Šepić's alliance with Izetbegović did not last long, and he was openly critical of the SDA's political maneuvering that led to the establishment of Denis Zvizdić's ministry on March 31, 2015. He accused his party of making too many concessions and remarked that the results gave the appearance of a victory for Bosnian Croat leader Dragan Čović at the expense of leading Bosniak politicians. In the same interview, Šepić said that the SDA should become a "modern, democratic, and pro-European centre-right party" consistent with Tihić's vision of the party.

In June 2015, Šepić joined with three other SDA parliamentarians to announce they would no longer follow the decisions of the SDA leadership; this followed contentious internal party elections that were won by Izetbegović's faction. Šepić, defeated in his bid for re-election as a vice-chair, accused the party leadership of being undemocratic and was quoted as saying, "There is a videotape clearly showing that those who were sitting inside counting the votes were actually not members of the polling boards." The four rebels did not actually leave the SDA, and as of 2016, the Bosnian parliamentary website indicates that Šepić is still a member of the party caucus. He left the party in 2017.

=== Within the Independent Bloc ===
After leaving the SDA, Šepić was elected president of the then newly formed Independent Bloc.

== Views ==
=== Views on the Bosnian constitution ===
Šepić has argued that Bosnia's constitution fails to protect the human rights of its citizens and has called for meaningful reforms to "[protect] the individual and collective rights of everyone living anywhere in Bosnia and Herzegovina" as well as to "return the decision-making process to the institutions of the system, to the Presidency, the parliament and the government."
