= Hasan Muratović =

Bosnian politician (1940–2020)

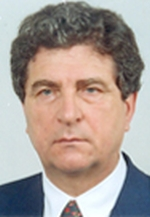

Prime Minister of the Republic of Bosnia and Herzegovina
- In office 30 January 1996 – 3 January 1997
- President: Alija Izetbegović; Momčilo Krajišnik; Krešimir Zubak
- Preceded by: Haris Silajdžić
- Succeeded by: Office abolished
Ministerial offices
Minister of Foreign Trade and Economic Relations
In office 3 January 1997 – 4 February 1999
Prime Minister	Haris Silajdžić; Boro Bosić (as Co-Chairmen)
Preceded by	Office established
Succeeded by	Mirsad Kurtović
Minister without portfolio
In office June 1992 – 30 January 1996
Prime Minister	Jure Pelivan; Mile Akmadžić; Haris Silajdžić
Preceded by	Office established
Succeeded by	Office abolished
Additional positions
Rector of the University of Sarajevo
In office 1 October 2004 – 30 September 2006
Preceded by	Boris Tihi
Succeeded by	Faruk Čaklovica
Vice President of the Parliamentary Assembly of the Council of Europe
In office 2002–2004
President	Peter Schieder

Personal details
- Born: April 11, 1940 Olovo, Kingdom of Yugoslavia
- Died: 14 November 2020 (aged 80) Sarajevo, Bosnia and Herzegovina
- Party: Party of Democratic Action
- Spouse: Mulija Čabaravdić
- Children: 2
- Education: University of Ljubljana (BS); University of Sarajevo (MS); University of Belgrade (PhD)

Hasan Muratović (11 April 1940 – 14 November 2020) was a Bosnian politician, entrepreneur and professor who served as the last Prime Minister of the Republic of Bosnia and Herzegovina from 1996 to 1997. He also served as Minister without portfolio in all of the governments of the Republic of Bosnia and Herzegovina throughout the Bosnian War. Muratović was the first post-war Minister of Foreign Trade and Economic Relations, serving from 1997 to 1999. He was a member of the Party of Democratic Action.

Muratović was also known for his long-term professorship at the Faculty of Economics and the Faculty of Electrical Engineering at the University of Sarajevo. He was also rector of the University of Sarajevo from 2004 to 2006. He was a successful manager in many positions in business companies as well as a consultant in domestic and international consulting firms, including Deloitte. Muratović served as an ambassador to Croatia from 1999 to 2002, as well as being the Vice President of the Parliamentary Assembly of the Council of Europe from 2002 to 2004. Up to his death, he was professor emeritus of University of Sarajevo, part-time professor and consultant.

== Education ==
Muratović earned his Bachelor of Science degree in mechanical engineering at the University of Ljubljana in 1964, the Master of Science degree in organization sciences at the University of Sarajevo in 1972 and the PhD at the Faculty of Organizational Sciences, Belgrade in 1981.

== Academic career ==
Muratović began teaching as an assistant professor at the Faculty of Mechanical Engineering of the University of Sarajevo in 1974. In 1982, he was promoted to lecturer at Faculty of Electrical Engineering, University of Sarajevo and later professor in 1988 in Theory of Systems and Analyses of Information Systems where he lectured until he was elected rector. He was, at the same time, professor in Management and Organization at the Economic Faculty Sarajevo where he founded the Department of M&O and was its manager (1989–2006). As rector of the University of Sarajevo, Muratović reformed the system of high education and introduced the Bologna Process of Higher Education.

He was an author of four and co-author of six books and over 120 papers in the field of strategy, restructuring, organization structures, change, crisis management and negotiations.

== Business career ==
Parallel with his academic career, Muratović was also active in business companies transferring his knowledge from research and university to practical projects and management. After finishing his studies in mechanical engineering, he worked in Fabrika motora Sarajevo (largely known as FAMOS) from 1964 to 1973, first as a designer in R&D department and then as a manager of production planning and the manager of strategic planning, finances and information systems. He then joined the United Bus Company of Lusaka, Zambia during the period of 1973–1977 as a regional manager, where he established state passenger transportation. After that assignment, Muratović worked for ten years as a consultant in Institute for Economic and Organization Sarajevo from 1977 until 1987. During that ten-year period, he managed development and construction of large military industry complexes in Iraq.

During the late 1980s and early 1990s, Muratović managed the Institute for Research and Development of UPI, one of the ten biggest companies in the former Yugoslavia. In 1989, he established his own consulting company, BHM, which operated very successfully until the beginning of the war. Muratović was the chairman of the Bosnia version of Deloitte from 2004 to 2008, and then a consultant for Management consulting projects.

== Political career ==
Muratović began his political career in the beginning of the Bosnian War. In June 1992, he took position of minister in the first wartime government of the Republic of Bosnia and Herzegovina. He served in different ministerial positions in all six war governments, the longest period as a minister without portfolio and president of State Committee for Cooperation with UNPROFOR (United Nations Protection Force) and other international organizations. He was known as a very successful negotiator. Muratović negotiated also, through all of the war, with enemies (other two warring sides). In memoirist books written by representatives of international organizations, Muratović is described as a tough and rational negotiator. After the Dayton Agreement had been signed, in which signatory ceremony he participated, he became the last Prime Minister of the Republic of Bosnia and Herzegovina on 30 January 1996, serving until 3 January 1997.

During his period as Prime Minister, Muratović created the first plan for post-war reconstruction, together with World Bank expert teams, completed negotiations with Paris and London Clubs and other international financial institutions. He also organised donor conferences held with the support of the High Representative of the UN and EU in which US5.1 billion was collected for the post-war recovery. Muratović was also governor of Bosnia and Herzegovina for the World Bank from 1996 to 1998. He acted as a leader of two election campaigns for the Party of Democratic Action (SDA) in 1996 and in 2002. In both he obtained the best results.

After the first post-war elections, Muratović became the first Minister of Foreign Trade and Economic Relations on 3 January 1997, but resigned two years later after getting appointed as Bosnia and Herzegovina Ambassador to Croatia on 4 February 1999. In 2002, he left the ambassador role and became the Vice President of the Parliamentary Assembly of the Council of Europe. Muratović resigned from that position in 2004, taking the new position of rector at the University of Sarajevo, serving until 2006.

== Personal life ==
Muratović lived in Sarajevo, Bosnia and Herzegovina up to his death, where he was married to Mulija Čabaravdić and had two sons: Amir, film director and architect and Faruk, management consultant.

== Death ==
Muratović died on 14 November 2020, in Sarajevo, as a result of complications caused by the COVID-19 pandemic in Bosnia and Herzegovina.

== Awards and orders ==
=== Awards ===
Muratović received a number of awards and achievements for his work in academic, political and business fields. Among many others, he received the Golden Plaque of FAMOS in 1987, the Sixth April Award of Sarajevo in 1990, the Silver Order from the Presidency of the Federal Republic of Yugoslavia in 1998, the Croatian Order of Duke Trpimir and two Plaques of the University of Sarajevo in 1999 and in 2006.

=== Orders ===
- Croatia; Order of Duke Trpimir
