= Cabinet of Vjekoslav Bevanda =

Bevanda Cabinet
- 11th Cabinet of Bosnia and Herzegovina
- 2012–2015
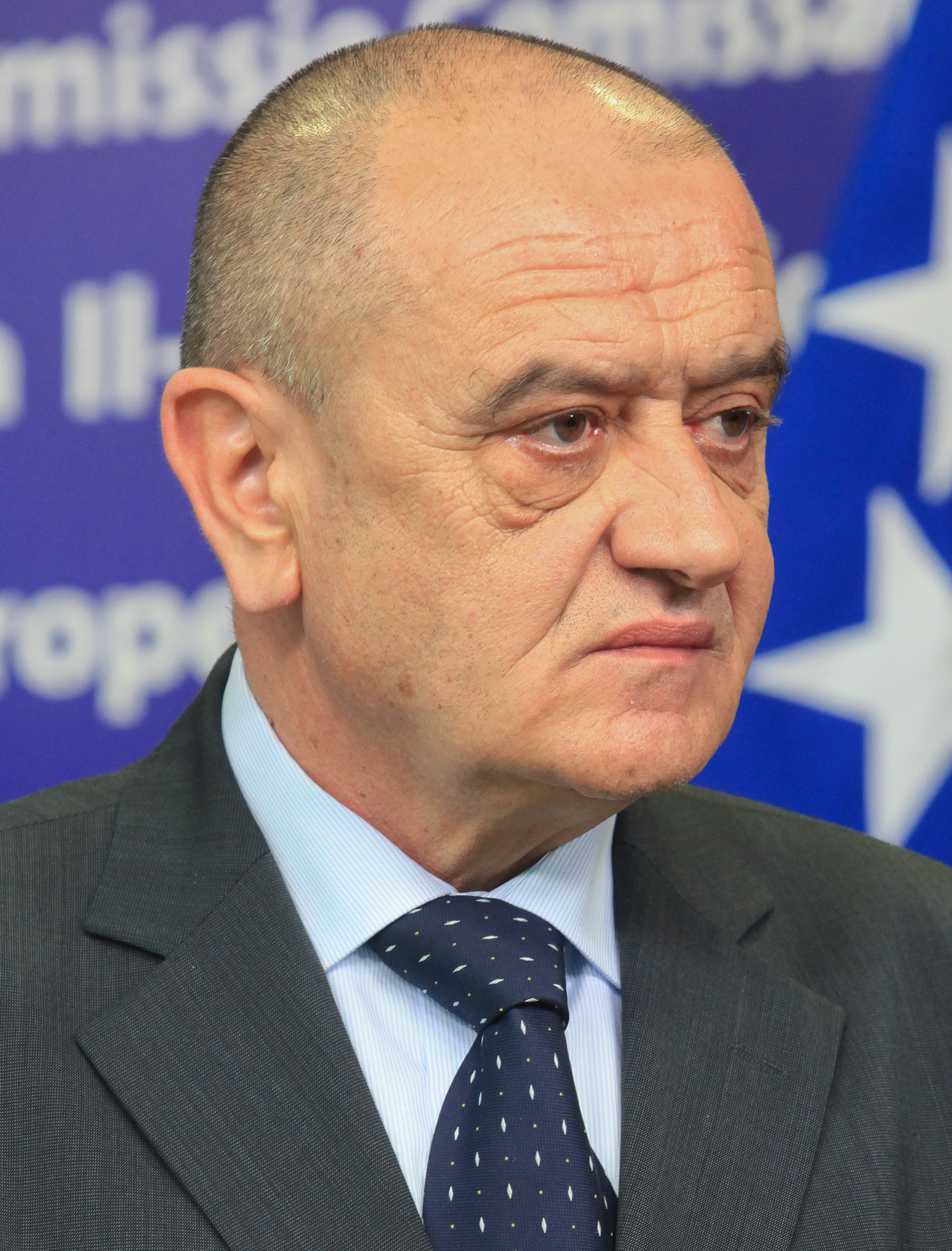
- Date formed: 12 January 2012
- Date dissolved: 31 March 2015

People and organisations
- Head of state: Presidency List: Bakir Izetbegović; Nebojša Radmanović; Željko Komšić
- Head of government: Vjekoslav Bevanda
- Deputy head of government: Zlatko Lagumdžija; Nikola Špirić
- No. of ministers: 9
- Total no. of members: 10
- Member parties: Social Democratic Party; Alliance of Independent Social Democrats; Croatian Democratic Union; Croatian Democratic Union 1990
- Status in legislature: Minority coalition government

History
- Election: 2010 general election
- Legislature term: 2010–2014
- Predecessor: Cabinet of Nikola Špirić II
- Successor: Cabinet of Denis Zvizdić

The Eleventh Council of Ministers of Bosnia and Herzegovina (Bosnian and Croatian: Jedanaesti saziv Vijeća ministara Bosne i Hercegovine, Serbian: Једанаести сазив Савјета министара Босне и Херцеговине / Jedanaesti saziv Savjeta ministara Bosne i Hercegovine) was the Council of Ministers of Bosnia and Herzegovina cabinet formed on 12 January 2012, following the 2010 general election and the one-year governmental formation crisis. It was led by Chairman of the Council of Ministers Vjekoslav Bevanda. The cabinet was dissolved on 31 March 2015 and was succeeded by a new Council of Ministers presided over by Denis Zvizdić.

== Governmental formation crisis ==
Following the 2010 general election, a process of formation of Bosnia and Herzegovina's Council of Ministers had begun. The resulting election produced a fragmented political landscape without a coalition of a parliamentary majority more than a year after the election. The centre-left Social Democratic Party of Bosnia and Herzegovina (SDP BiH), the largest party in the Federation of Bosnia and Herzegovina, and the Bosnian Serb autonomist Alliance of Independent Social Democrats (SNSD), the largest party in Republika Srpska, each had 8 MPs of the total 42 MPs of the House of Representatives (28 from the Federation and 14 from Republika Srpska).

After months of political wrangling and deadlock, in late 2011, the Council of Ministers had been solved, however the country remained in a situation of perpetual political crisis.

== Investiture ==
Investiture; Vjekoslav Bevanda (HDZ BiH)
Ballot →	12 January 2012
Required majority →	22 out of 42
Yes	26 / 42
No	7 / 42
Abstentions	1 / 42
Absentees	8 / 42

== Party breakdown ==
Party breakdown of cabinet ministers:

- Social Democratic Party
4
- Alliance of Independent Social Democrats
3
- Croatian Democratic Union
2
- Croatian Democratic Union 1990
1

== Cabinet members ==
The Cabinet was structured into the offices for the chairman of the Council of Ministers, the two vice chairs and 9 ministries.

← Bevanda Cabinet → (12 January 2012 – 31 March 2015)
Portfolio	Name	Party	Took office	Left office
Chairman of the Council of Ministers	Vjekoslav Bevanda	HDZ BiH	12 January 2012	31 March 2015
Minister of Foreign Affairs; Vice Chairman of the Council of Ministers	Zlatko Lagumdžija	SDP BiH	12 January 2012	31 March 2015
Minister of Finance and Treasury; Vice Chairman of the Council of Ministers	Nikola Špirić	SNSD	12 January 2012	31 March 2015
Minister of Foreign Trade and Economic Relations	Boris Tučić	SNSD	5 December 2013	31 March 2015
Minister of Defence	Zekerijah Osmić	SDP BiH	22 November 2012	31 March 2015
Minister of Security	Mladen Ćavar (acting)	SDP BiH	29 April 2014	31 March 2015
Minister of Justice	Bariša Čolak	HDZ BiH	12 January 2012	31 March 2015
Minister of Civil Affairs	Sredoje Nović	SNSD	12 January 2012	31 March 2015
Minister of Communication and Traffic	Damir Hadžić	SDP BiH	12 January 2012	31 March 2015
Minister of Human Rights and Refugees	Damir Ljubić	HDZ 1990	12 January 2012	31 March 2015
