= Bosic =

Bosic or Bosić is a surname. Notable people with the surname include:

- Andrea Bosic (1919–2012), Italian film actor of Slovene origin
- Boro Bosić (born 1950), Bosnian Serb politician
- Mladen Bosić (born 1961), Bosnian Serb politician
- Radivoj Bosić (born 2000), Serbian footballer
