= Košarac =

Košarac is a surname. Notable people with the surname include:

- Staša Košarac (born 1975), Bosnian Serb politician
- Tanja Karišik-Košarac (born 1991), Bosnian cross-country skier and biathlete
