= Haris Silajdžić =

Bosnian politician and academic (born 1945)

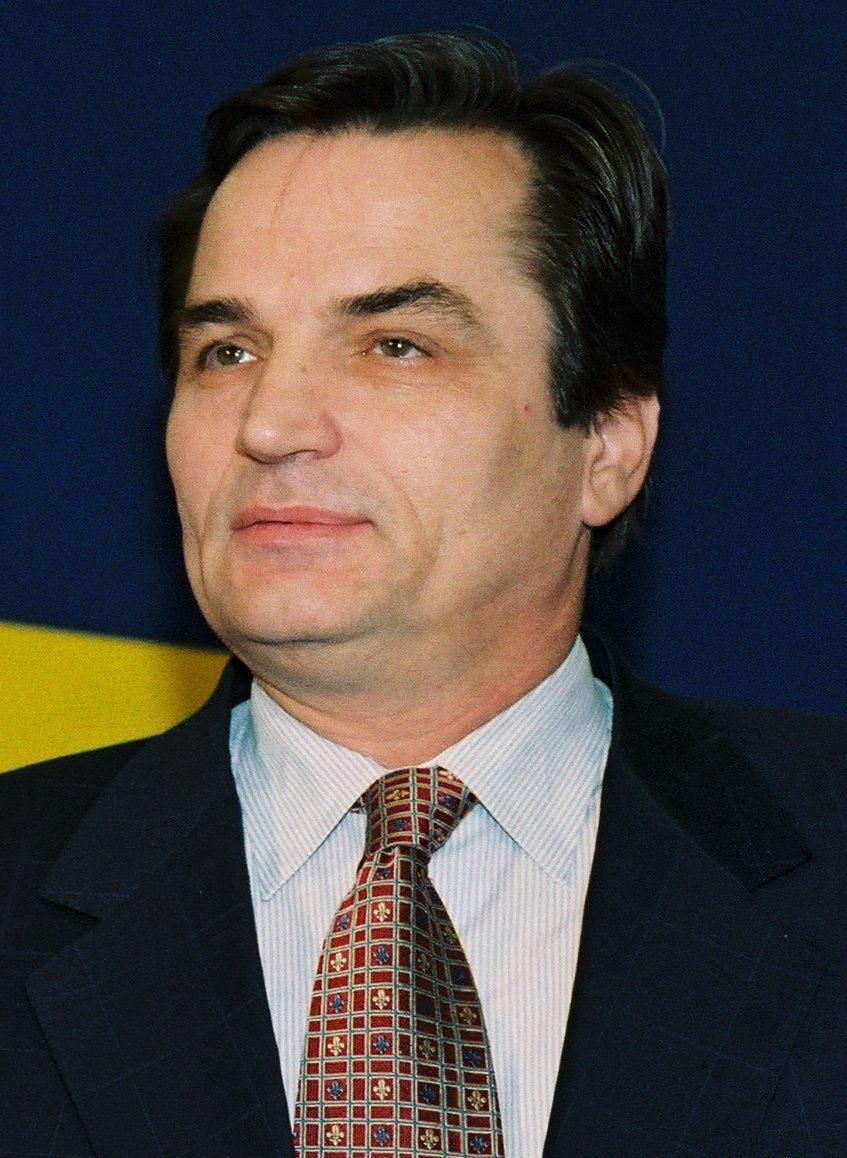
- Silajdžić in 1995

Bosniak member of the Presidency of Bosnia and Herzegovina
- In office 6 November 2006 – 10 November 2010 (Note: Serving as the Chairman of the Presidency from 6 March 2008 to 6 November 2008, and from 6 March 2010 to 10 November 2010.)
- Prime Minister: Adnan Terzić; Nikola Špirić
- Preceded by: Sulejman Tihić
- Succeeded by: Bakir Izetbegović

Co-chairman of the Council of Ministers of Bosnia and Herzegovina
- In office 3 January 1997 – 6 June 2000 Serving with Boro Bosić (1997–99); Svetozar Mihajlović (1999–2000)
- President: See list: Alija Izetbegović Momčilo Krajišnik Živko Radišić Krešimir Zubak Ante Jelavić
- Preceded by: Office established
- Succeeded by: Spasoje Tuševljak (as Chairman of the Council of Ministers)

Prime Minister of the Federation of Bosnia and Herzegovina
- In office 31 May 1994 – 31 January 1996
- President: Krešimir Zubak
- Preceded by: Office established
- Succeeded by: Izudin Kapetanović

Prime Minister of the Republic of Bosnia and Herzegovina
- In office 25 October 1993 – 30 January 1996
- President: Alija Izetbegović
- Deputy: Zlatko Lagumdžija
- Preceded by: Mile Akmadžić
- Succeeded by: Hasan Muratović
Ministerial offices
Minister of Foreign Affairs
In office 20 December 1990 – 30 October 1993
Prime Minister	Jure Pelivan; Mile Akmadžić
Preceded by	Office established
Succeeded by	Irfan Ljubijankić
Additional positions
President of the Party for Bosnia and Herzegovina
In office 13 April 1996 – 6 March 2012
Preceded by	Office established
Succeeded by	Amer Jerlagić

Personal details
- Born: 1 October 1945 (age 81) Breza, PR Bosnia and Herzegovina, FPR Yugoslavia
- Party: Party for Bosnia and Herzegovina (1996–present)
- Other political affiliations: Party of Democratic Action (1990–1996)
- Spouses: Maja Zvonić (divorced) Selma Muhedinović (m. 2016)
- Children: 1
- Education: University of Benghazi (BA); University of Pristina (MA, PhD)

Haris Silajdžić (Bosnian pronunciation: [xaris silajdʒitɕ]; born 1 October 1945) is a Bosnian politician and academic who served as the Bosniak member of the Presidency of Bosnia and Herzegovina from 2006 to 2010. He was the Prime Minister of the Republic of Bosnia and Herzegovina from 1993 to 1996, and previously served as Minister of Foreign Affairs from 1990 to 1993. He is Bosnia and Herzegovina's longest-serving head of government since the Yugoslav era.

Silajdžić was born in Breza in 1945. He graduated in Arabic language and Islamic studies at the University of Benghazi in Libya, and then earned his master's degree and doctorate from the University of Pristina. He entered into politics in the early 1990s, serving as Bosnia and Herzegovina's Minister of Foreign Affairs and later as Prime Minister during the Bosnian War. In the height of the war, Silajdžić was one of the most influential Bosnian officials and a close ally of the country's first president of the presidency, Alija Izetbegović. From 1994 until 1996, Silajdžić served as the first Prime Minister of the Federation of Bosnia and Herzegovina. After his term as Federal Prime Minister ended, he was appointed Co-chairman of the Council of Ministers of Bosnia and Herzegovina in 1997, serving until 2000.

In the 2006 general election, Silajdžić successfully ran for a seat in the Bosnian Presidency as a Bosniak member obtaining nearly 63% of the vote, defeating incumbent Sulejman Tihić. Silajdžić served as member until 2010, after losing his bid for re-election in the 2010 general election, only finishing in third place.

Originally, a prominent member of Alija Izetbegović's Party of Democratic Action (SDA), Silajdžić left the SDA in 1996 to establish the Party for Bosnia and Herzegovina (SBiH). As both president of the SBiH and Presidency member, he took part in many constitutional reform talks, most notably in those regarding the 2006 April package, a compromise proposal for constitutional amendments which included, among other things, an individual president indirectly elected by Parliament, as opposed to being directly elected by popular vote. Silajdžić's decision for his to party to vote against the proposed package proved to be crucial for the amendments' ultimate failure. Silajdžić served as SBiH president until retiring from politics in 2012, amidst the party's rapidly declining popularity.

== Political career ==
=== Early years ===
From 1990 to 1993, during the Bosnian War, Silajdžić served as the first Minister of Foreign Affairs of the Republic of Bosnia and Herzegovina and as the Prime Minister from October 1993 to January 1996. Originally, he was a member and vice-president of the Party of Democratic Action (SDA), but broke away from the party in 1996 by funding his own Party for Bosnia and Herzegovina (SBiH). His SBiH entered the Parliamentary Assembly of Bosnia and Herzegovina and become one of the leading Bosnian Muslim parties the following year. Also from 31 May 1994 to 31 January 1996, Silajdžić served as the first Prime Minister of the Federation of Bosnia and Herzegovina.

During the war, he was a strong ally and type of a consultant of Alija Izetbegović, the first and only president of the Republic of Bosnia and Herzegovina.

=== Post-war career ===
After the end of the war, Silajdžić was appointed Co-chairman of the Council of Ministers of Bosnia and Herzegovina on 3 January 1997. He served alongside Boro Bosić and Svetozar Mihajlović until 6 June 2000.

In the 2000 parliamentary election, the SBiH formed a coalition with the Social Democratic Party, a party led by former wartime deputy prime minister Zlatko Lagumdžija, to gain the majority and force the nationalist parties out of power. They gathered a coalition of many other small parties to create the "Alliance for Change". The coalition government facilitated the passage of the Election Law, which was not only an important step towards democracy, but also a prerequisite to Bosnia and Herzegovina's accession to the Council of Europe. The SDP BiH and the SBiH led the government until the October 2002 general election, when the public, dissatisfied at the pace of political reform, elected the nationalist parties back into power.

==== Constitutional reform ====
The 2005 Opinion of the Venice Commission, an advisory body of the Council of Europe, which coincided with the 10th anniversary of the Dayton Agreement opened the debate on a constitutional reform in Bosnia and Herzegovina, on the impulse of U.S. diplomacy, with a view of modernizing the country's institutions.

The U.S. Ambassador Douglas L. McElhaney in Sarajevo and Ambassador Donald Hays in Washington led the U.S. talks with party leaders and the initiative to draft a compromise proposal for constitutional amendments, dubbed the April Package (aprilski paket). Overall, the April Package would have better defined and partly expanded State competences, and streamlined institutions, partly limiting the veto powers of ethnic groups. The amended Constitution would have included, among other things, an individual President (with two deputies, one for each constituent people, to rotate every 16 months instead of 8), indirectly elected by Parliament with a more ceremonial role, and a reinforced Chairman of the Council of Ministers.

At the moment of Parliamentary approval, the constitutional amendments failed by 2 votes, only gathering 26 MPs in favour over 42, instead of the required 28. This was due to the maximalist pre-electoral positions taken by Silajdžić's SBiH (wishing to also abolish entity voting) and by the Croatian Democratic Union 1990 (HDZ 1990) splinter party, who felt the proposal did not sufficiently protect the Bosnian Croats. The U.S. would try to rescue the April Package by facilitating further talks in 2007 between Bosnian Serb leader Milorad Dodik and Silajdžić as the newly-elected member of the Presidency of Bosnia and Herzegovina, but to no avail.

== Presidency (2006–2010) ==
=== 2006 general election ===
Silajdžić had a strong political comeback in the 2006 general election, obtaining 62.80% of the vote and getting elected as the 5th Bosniak member of the collective Presidency of Bosnia and Herzegovina, defeating incumbent Sulejman Tihić, who was also the SDA president at the time.

=== Domestic policy ===
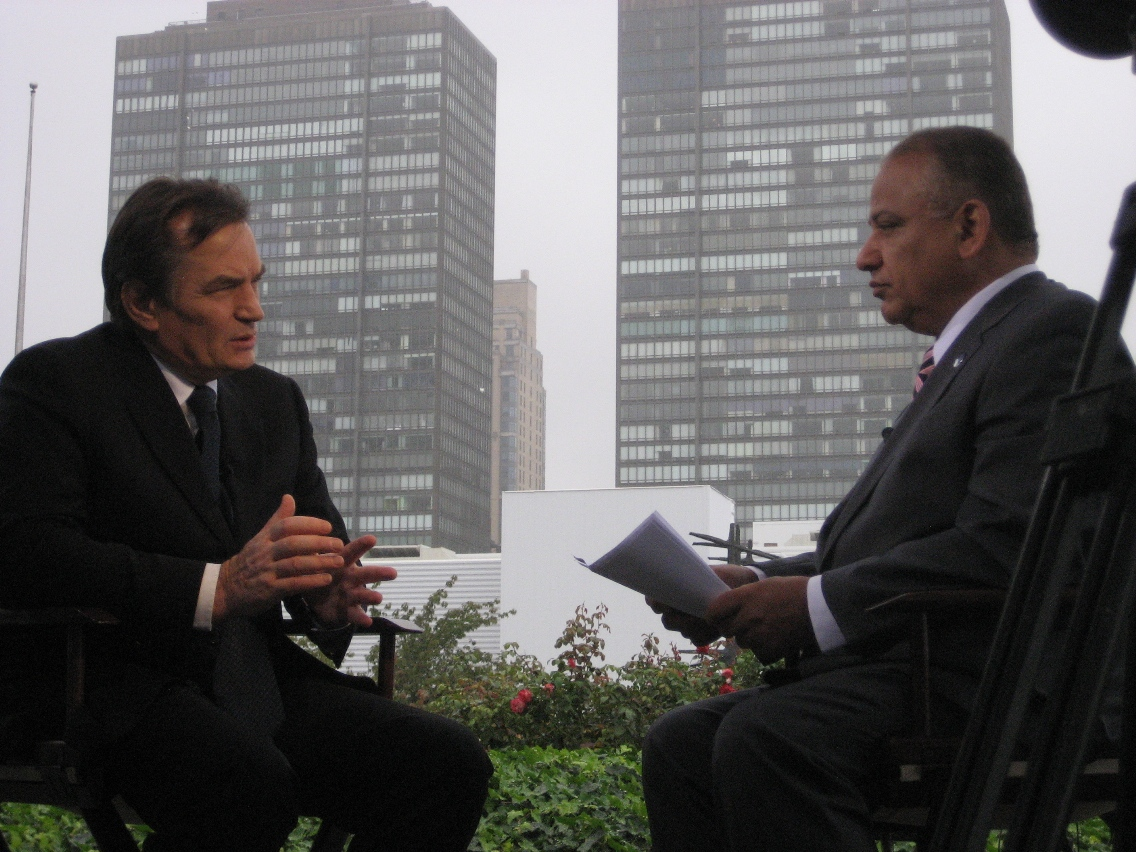
Silajdžić being interviewed by Talal Al-Haj during the United Nations General Assembly in 2009

In 2007, the International Court of Justice in the Hague acquitted Serbia of the charges of complicity in genocide brought against the "Federal Republic of Yugoslavia" by the Bosnian government. Silajdžić expressed disappointment at the court's ruling, but welcomed the fact that the court "ruled that Serbia and Montenegro had violated the Genocide Convention by not preventing or punishing the perpetrators of the genocide."

Silajdžić was a member of the Bosnian delegation which negotiated the US-brokered Dayton Agreement. He continued stressing that the document was essential in ending the genocide in Bosnia and Herzegovina, but later saw it as an obstacle in reunifying the country. Making strong steps and claims in 2006 and 2007 towards canceling certain parts of the Dayton Agreement, Silajdžić directly opposed the constitution of the country, thus being a very controversial political figure, famous on the Bosniak and infamous on the Serbian side. His main goals were abolishing the existence of Republika Srpska, breaking certain relations with Serbia and reforming the country towards unity.

In the 2010 general election, Silajdžić decided to run for a second term in the Presidency, but failed to do so when election day came, getting only 25.10% of the votes, 5% less than Fahrudin Radončić and 9% less than elected Bakir Izetbegović, the son of Alija Izetbegović.

During his four-year term as Presidency member, Silajdžić was backed by authorities and organizations throughout Bosnia and Herzegovina that voiced dissatisfaction with the Dayton Agreement provisions and opposed the autonomy of the Republika Srpska entity within Bosnia and Herzegovina.

=== Foreign policy ===
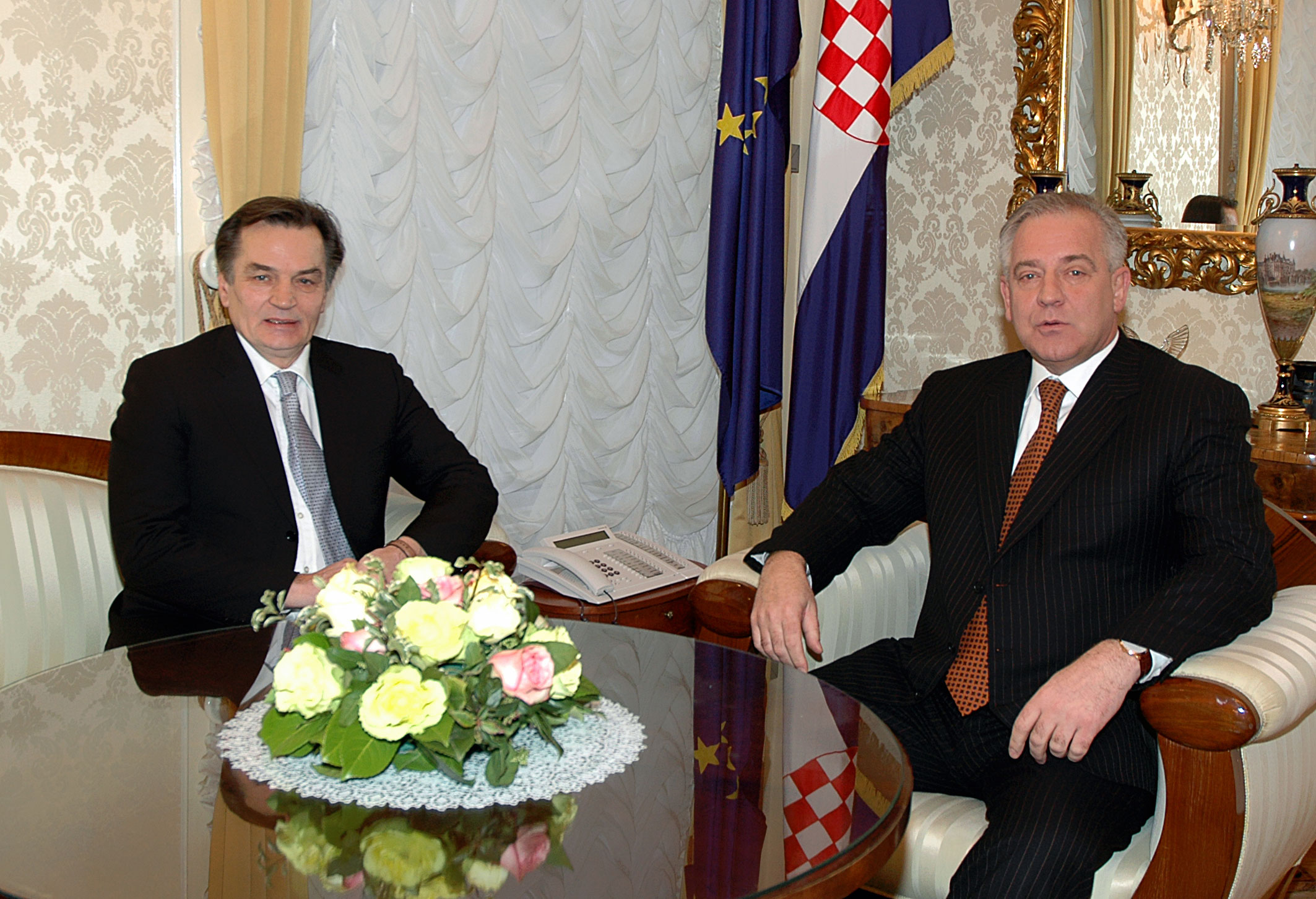
Silajdžić with Croatian Prime Minister Ivo Sanader, 22 January 2009

Silajdžić opposed the ratification of an agreement with Croatia on dual citizenship. According to the Bosnian nationality law, which was valid at the time, all citizens of Bosnia and Herzegovina who did not renounce their citizenship with whom the country did not have an agreement on dual citizenship, would lose their Bosnian citizenship. This was problematic for almost half a million Bosnian Croats, who would remain without Bosnian citizenship until 2014. The Bosnian Presidency would eventually ratify the Agreement with Croatia in October 2011.

==== Reaction to Kosovo's independence ====
Following Kosovo's declaration of independence from Serbia, Silajdžić said simply that his country was "unlikely to recognize Kosovo's independence any time soon due to strong objections from its own Serb community." While attending the Sixty-third session of the United Nations General Assembly in September 2008, Silajdžić said in a Voice of America interview broadcast back to Bosnia and Herzegovina that he supported Kosovo's independence and was opposed to Serbia's request that the International Court of Justice issue an opinion on the legitimacy of Kosovo's independence. Silajdžić spoke in his own name because the Bosnian Presidency did not unanimously adopt a platform which would have allowed him to speak officially.

== Personal life ==
Silajdžić has been married to former Bosnian pop singer Selma Muhedinović since 2016, after he had reportedly been in a relationship with her for over fifteen years. Silajdžić said that their mutual tendency towards art, his being poetry and hers being music, was what initially sparked their attraction. They live in Sarajevo. He was previously married to Maja Zvonić, with whom he has a son.

=== Health ===
On 27 May 2020, Silajdžić underwent a successful open heart surgery in Sarajevo after the situation with the blood vessels in his heart worsened.

== Awards and honours ==
In July 1995, Silajdžić was conferred the Croatian Order of Duke Trpimir.

In 2005, he received a Doctorate in International Relations honoris causa by the Geneva School of Diplomacy and International Relations. In 2018, Silajdžić was conferred Nishan-e-Pakistan for his services to Pakistan by the president of Pakistan, Mamnoon Hussain.

== Orders ==
- Order of Duke Trpimir: 1995
- Nishan-e-Pakistan: 2018

== Notes ==
Political offices
Preceded by Mile Akmadžić	Prime Minister of the Republic Bosnia and Herzegovina; 1993–1996	Succeeded by Hasan Muratović
Preceded by Office established	Co-Chairman of the Council of Ministers of Bosnia and Herzegovina; 1997–2000; Served alongside: Boro Bosić: 1997–1999; Svetozar Mihajlović: 1999–2000	Succeeded by Office abolished
Preceded by Sulejman Tihić	Bosniak member of the Presidency of Bosnia and Herzegovina; 2006–2010	Succeeded by Bakir Izetbegović
Preceded by Željko Komšić	Chairman of the Presidency of Bosnia and Herzegovina; 2008	Succeeded by Nebojša Radmanović
Preceded by Željko Komšić	Chairman of the Presidency of Bosnia and Herzegovina; 2010	Succeeded by Nebojša Radmanović
