= Faruk Čaklovica =

Bosnian academic (born 1953)

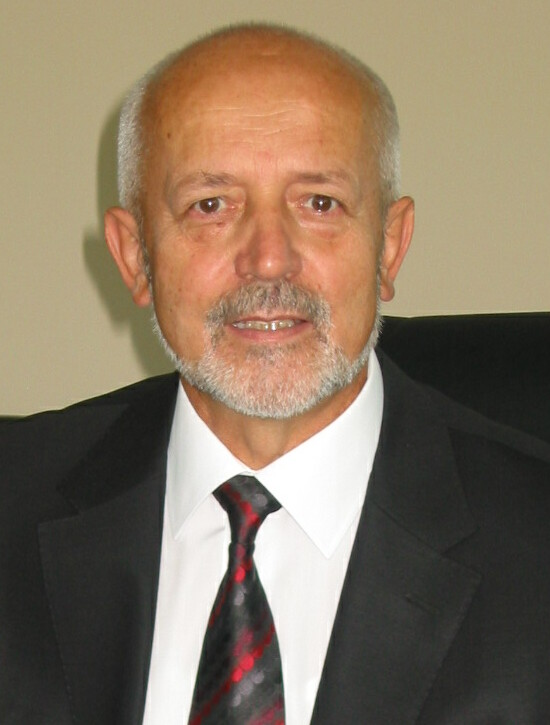
- Čaklovica in 2012

Rector of the University of Sarajevo
- In office 1 October 2006 – 30 September 2012
- Preceded by: Hasan Muratović
- Succeeded by: Muharem Avdispahić

Personal details
- Born: 1953 (age 71–72) Zvornik, PR Bosnia and Herzegovina, FPR Yugoslavia
- Children: 1
- Education: University of Sarajevo (BS, MS, V.M.D.)

Faruk Čaklovica (born 1953) is a Bosnian academic and professor of Bromatology who was rector of the University of Sarajevo from 2006 to 2012. He has been a board member of the Balkan Universities Network since 2010.

== Biography ==
Born in Zvornik in 1953, Čaklovica received his BS in veterinary medicine from the Faculty of Veterinary medicine at the University of Sarajevo in 1977. He earned an MS and doctorate from the same Faculty in 1983 and 1987. He attended post-doctoral studies in the United States (1987), Denmark (1989), Malaysia (1996), Egypt (1999) and Germany (1999).

In 2001, Čaklovica took up the post of dean of the Faculty of Veterinary medicine in Sarajevo until 2006, when he was appointed as rector of the Sarajevo University. He authored and co-authored 143 scientific and expert papers in the areas of applied food microbiology, bacteria diseases transferable by food, human nutrition, hygiene and technology of food.

For his continuous work in the fields of science and health care, Čaklovica received the Sixth of April Sarajevo Award in 2020. He is married and has one child.
