= Dubravka Bošnjak =

Bosnian economist and politician (born 1976)

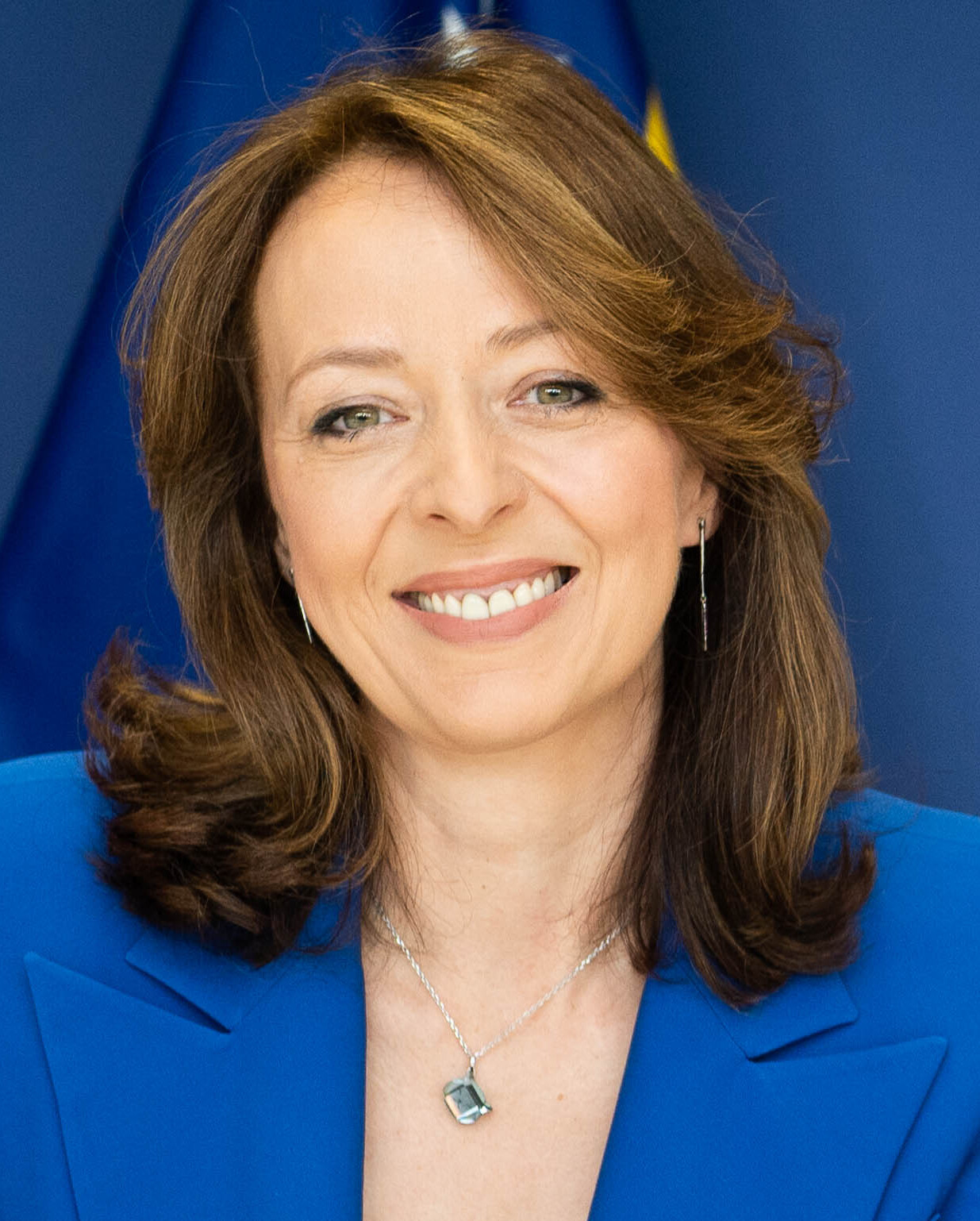
- Bošnjak in 2024

Minister of Civil Affairs
- Incumbent
- Assumed office 25 January 2023
- Prime Minister: Borjana Krišto
- Preceded by: Ankica Gudeljević

Personal details
- Born: 5 June 1976 (age 50) Sarajevo, SR Bosnia and Herzegovina, SFR Yugoslavia
- Party: Croatian Democratic Union
- Education: University of Sarajevo (BEc); University of Zenica (MEc, PhD)

Dubravka Bošnjak (born 5 June 1976) is a Bosnian economist and politician serving as Minister of Civil Affairs since January 2023. A member of the Croatian Democratic Union, she previously served as deputy director of the Federal Banking Agency between 2017 and 2023.

== Early life and education ==
Bošnjak was born on 5 June 1976 in Sarajevo, SR Bosnia and Herzegovina, SFR Yugoslavia. She earned her bachelor degree in economics from the Faculty of Economics of the University of Sarajevo in 1998, where she also obtained a master's degree in accounting and auditing in 2008. She later got a PhD in economics from the University of Zenica in 2013, with a thesis on contemporary models for assessing the financial position of companies.

== Banking career ==
Bošnjak worked at the Development Bank of the Federation of Bosnia and Herzegovina as director of Credit and Placement Sector, and was also executive director for Research, Development and Financing. She also served as deputy director of the Banking Agency of the Federation of Bosnia and Herzegovina between 2017 and 2023. Since 2013, she has lectured at the University of Vitez.

== Political career ==
On 25 January 2023, following the formation of a new Council of Ministers presided over by Borjana Krišto, Bošnjak was sworn in as the new Minister of Civil Affairs.

In August 2023, Bošnjak proposed Vjetrenica Cave as a UNESCO World Heritage Site candidate. In December 2024, the government approved her project for the demining of territories during the period 2025–2027 to improve the safety of citizens and economic exploitation of land for agriculture. As minister, she participated in meetings on Bosnia and Herzegovina's accession process to the European Association for Quality Assurance in Higher Education.

In April 2025, Bošnjak's ministry received the European Quality Certificate, a certificate of quality for public administration, transparency and institutional efficiency.
