= Adil Osmanović =

Bosnian politician (born 1963)

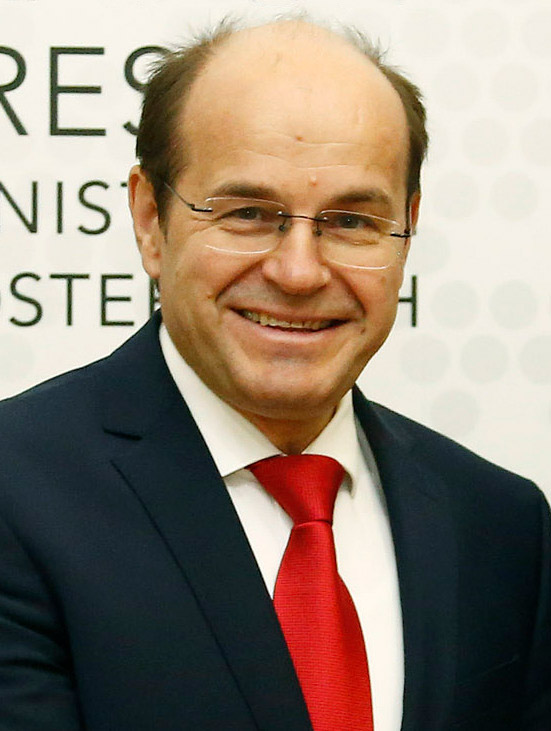
- Osmanović in 2016

Vice President of Republika Srpska
- In office 28 November 2002 – 15 November 2010 Serving with Ivan Tomljenović (2002–2006); Davor Čordaš (2006–2010)
- President: Dragan Čavić; Milan Jelić; Igor Radojičić (acting); Rajko Kuzmanović
- Preceded by: Dragan Čavić
- Succeeded by: Enes Suljkanović
Ministerial offices
Minister of Civil Affairs
In office 31 March 2015 – 23 December 2019
| Prime Minister | Denis Zvizdić |
| Preceded by | Sredoje Nović |
| Succeeded by | Ankica Gudeljević |
Federal Minister of Displaced Persons and Refugees
In office 17 March 2011 – 31 March 2015
| Prime Minister | Nermin Nikšić |
| Preceded by | Edin Mušić |
| Succeeded by | Edin Ramić |
Parliamentary offices
Member of the House of Representatives
In office
23 December 2019 – 1 December 2022
Member of the National Assembly of Republika Srpska
In office
16 December 2000 – 28 November 2002

Personal details
- Born: 24 July 1963 (age 63) Lukavac, SR Bosnia and Herzegovina, SFR Yugoslavia
- Party: Party of Democratic Action (1990–2024)
- Spouse: Nermina Osmanović
- Children: 2
- Education: University of Pristina (BA); University of Sarajevo (MA)

Adil Osmanović (born 24 July 1963) is a Bosnian politician who served as Vice President of Republika Srpska from 2002 to 2010. He also served as Minister of Civil Affairs from 2015 to 2019.

Born in Lukavac in 1963, Osmanović graduated from the University of Pristina, before enrolling in postgraduate studies at the University of Sarajevo. He joined the Party of Democratic Action (SDA) in 1990. In the 2000 general election, Osmanović was elected to the National Assembly of Republika Srpska. In the 2002 general election, he was elected Vice President of Republika Srpska, and was re-elected in 2006.

Osmanović later served as Federal Minister of Displaced Persons and Refugees from 2011 to 2015. He was a member of the national House of Representatives from 2019 to 2022 as well. A prominent figure of the SDA, he left the party in 2024.

== Early life and education ==
Born in Lukavac, SR Bosnia and Herzegovina, SFR Yugoslavia on 24 July 1963, Osmanović attended the Gazi Husrev-beg Madrasa in Sarajevo. He graduated from the Faculty of Philosophy in Pristina in 1990, and received his MA degree from the Faculty of Political Science in Sarajevo.

== Political career ==
Osmanović became a member of the Party of Democratic Action (SDA) during its foundation in 1990. Until May 1992, he was a councilor and secretary of the Municipal Assembly of Teslić, when he became the president of the war Presidency of this municipality. In the 2000 general election, Osmanović was elected to the National Assembly of Republika Srpska. In the 2002 general election, he was elected Vice President of Republika Srpska with 34,129 votes. In the 2006 general election, he was re-elected, gaining 22,444 votes.

In the 2010 general election, Osmanović was the holder of one SDA list for the national House of Representatives, but failed to get elected. Subsequently, he was appointed Federal Minister of Displaced Persons and Refugees in March 2011.

In the 2014 general election, Osmanović once again won a seat in the National Assembly of Republika Srpska, but instead of a parliamentary seat, he accepted a position in the executive branch, being appointed Minister of Civil Affairs on 31 March 2015 in the government of Denis Zvizdić. He served as minister until 23 December 2019. In the 2018 general election, he was elected to the national House of Representatives.

At the SDA's 6th congress, held on 26 May 2015, Osmanović was elected as the party's deputy president. At the 7th congress held on 14 September 2019, he was elected vice president of the SDA. In February 2024, Osmanović left the SDA following months of disagreements with its president Bakir Izetbegović.

== Personal life ==
Adil is married to Nermina Osmanović and together they have two sons. They live in Sarajevo.

Political offices
| Preceded by Sredoje Nović | Minister of Civil Affairs; 2015–2019 | Succeeded by Ankica Gudeljević |
