= Svetozar Mihajlović =

Bosnian Serb politician

- Светозар Михајловић

Co-chairman of the Council of Ministers of Bosnia and Herzegovina
- In office 3 February 1999 – 6 June 2000 Serving with Haris Silajdžić
- President: Alija Izetbegović; Živko Radišić; Ante Jelavić
- Preceded by: Boro Bosić
- Succeeded by: Spasoje Tuševljak (as Chairman of the Council of Ministers)
Ministerial offices
Minister of Civil Affairs and Communication
In office 22 February 2001 – 23 December 2002
Prime Minister	Božidar Matić; Zlatko Lagumdžija; Dragan Mikerević
Preceded by	Tihomir Gligorić
Succeeded by	Safet Halilović (as Minister of Civil Affairs); Branko Dokić (as Minister of Communication and Traffic)

Personal details
- Born: 1949 (age 76–77) PR Bosnia and Herzegovina, FPR Yugoslavia
- Party: Socialist Party

Svetozar Mihajlović (Serbian: Светозар Михајловић; born 1949) is a Bosnian Serb politician who served as Co-Chairman of the Council of Ministers of Bosnia and Herzegovina from 1999 to 2000, serving alongside Haris Silajdžić.

Mihajlović subsequently served as Minister of Civil Affairs and Communication from 2001 to 2002. He is currently a member of the Senate of Republika Srpska.
