= Dragutin Kosovac =

Bosnian politician

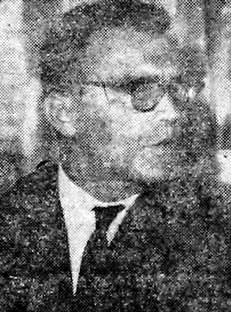
- Dragutin Kosovac (1965)

President of the Executive Council of SR Bosnia and Herzegovina
- In office 1969 – April 1974
- Preceded by: Branko Mikulić
- Succeeded by: Milanko Renovica

Personal details
- Born: 10 January 1924; Sarajevo, Sarajevo Oblast, Kingdom of Serbs, Croats and Slovenes
- Died: 22 January 2012 (aged 88); Sarajevo, Bosnia and Herzegovina

Military service
- Allegiance: League of Communists of Yugoslavia
- Branch/service: National Liberation Army
- Battles/wars: National Liberation War and Socialist Revolution

Dragutin Kosovac (10 January 1924 – 22 January 2012) was a Bosnian politician, and later the director of Energoinvest. He was awarded with a plaque by Serbian Civic Council, and he has several other awards and medals from anti-nazi organisations.

== Biography ==
Kosovac was born on 10 January 1924 in Sarajevo. In 1941 during World War II joined the Yugoslav Partisans. In 1965 he received his law degree from the University of Sarajevo. From 1963 to 1965 he was the trade minister of Bosnia and Herzegovina. He served in the under the first presidency of Socialist Republic of Bosnia and Herzegovina.
