= Ankica Gudeljević =

Bosnian diplomat and politician

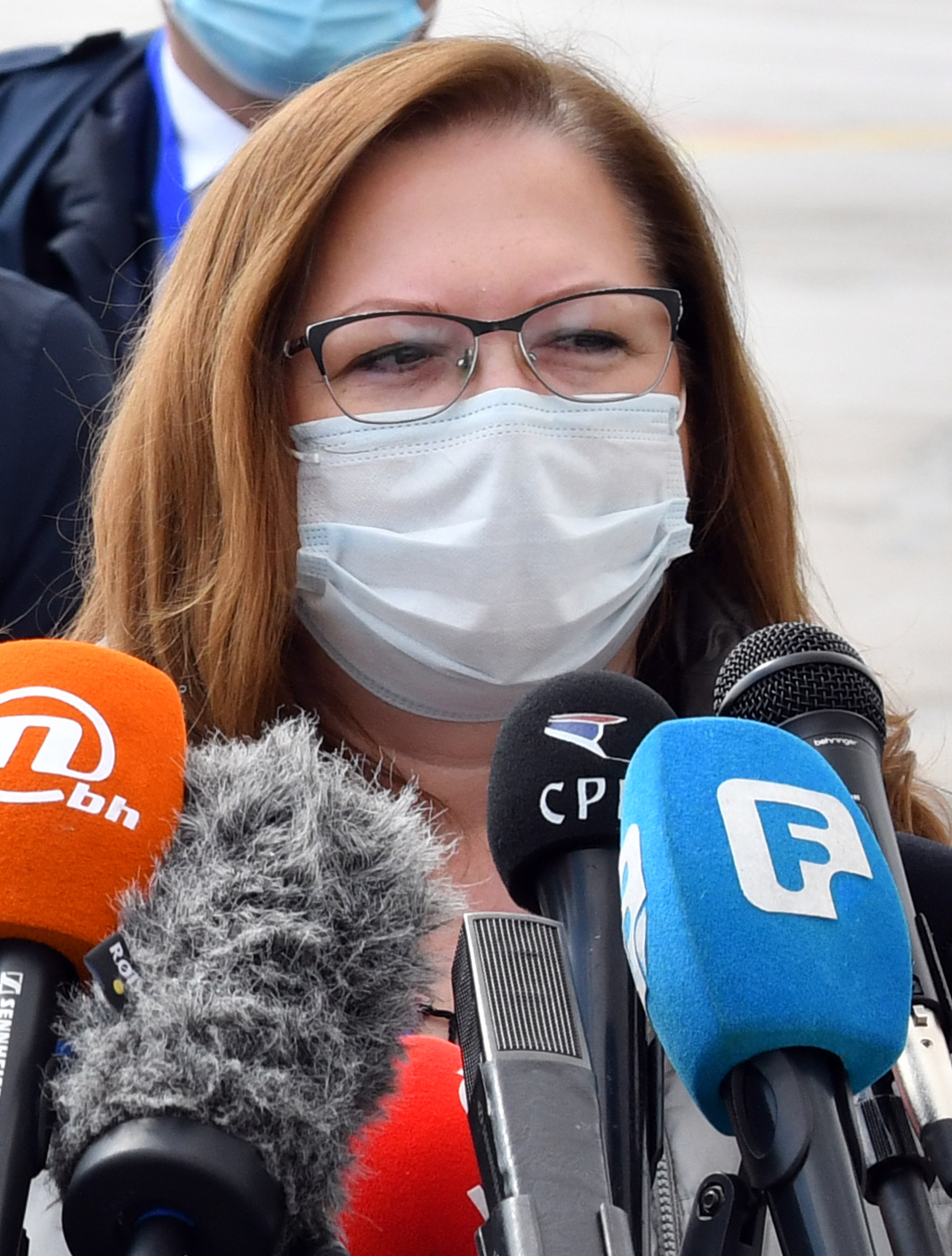
- Gudeljević in 2021

Minister of Civil Affairs
- In office 23 December 2019 – 25 January 2023
- Prime Minister: Zoran Tegeltija
- Preceded by: Adil Osmanović
- Succeeded by: Dubravka Bošnjak

Personal details
- Born: 26 July 1964 (age 62)
- Party: Croatian Democratic Union (1997–present)
- Education: University of Sarajevo

Ankica Gudeljević (born 26 July 1964) is a Bosnian diplomat and politician who served as Minister of Civil Affairs from 2019 to 2023. She is a member of the Croatian Democratic Union.

== Early life and education ==
Born on 26 July 1964, Gudeljević graduated in German Studies from the University of Sarajevo in 1988. From 1990 to 1996, she lived in Graz, where she worked as an interpreter and manager in the tourism sector. Then she moved to Brčko, where she worked from 1997 to 2003 as a German language teacher, from 2003 to 2009 as managing director of a foreign trade company and from 2009 to 2014 as head of the marketing department of the city administration of Brčko.

== Political career ==
From 2015 to 2018, Gudeljević was an adviser to the Deputy Minister of Foreign Affairs. On 19 October 2018, she was accredited as an ambassador for Bosnia and Herzegovina in Germany. She was replaced as ambassador on 7 May 2019.

On 23 December 2019, Gudeljević was appointed as Minister of Civil Affairs in the government of Zoran Tegeltija. She was succeeded as Minister of Civil Affairs by Dubravka Bošnjak on 25 January 2023, following the formation of a new government presided over by Borjana Krišto.

== Personal life ==
On 28 November 2020, it was confirmed that Gudeljević tested positive for COVID-19, amid its pandemic in Bosnia and Herzegovina.

Political offices
Preceded by Adil Osmanović	Minister of Civil Affairs; 2019–2023	Succeeded by Dubravka Bošnjak
