= Selma Muhedinović =

- Born: 6 June 1972 (age 54); Sarajevo, SR Bosnia and Herzegovina, SFR Yugoslavia
- Occupation: Pop vocalist
- Years active: 1997–2006
- Spouse: Haris Silajdžić (m. 2016)
- Musical career
- Genres: Pop folk; pop
- Instrument: Vocals

Selma Silajdžić (née Muhedinović; born 6 June 1972) is a Bosnian former pop singer, famous in Bosnia and Herzegovina in the late 1990s and early 2000s.

== Biography ==
Although establishing a promising pop music career in the late 1990s and early 2000s, Muhedinović retired in 2006. Her present day hobbies include playing violin and doing yoga.

Muhedinović had reportedly been in a relationship with Bosnian politician and former Presidency member Haris Silajdžić for over fifteen years when they married on 8 March 2016. Silajdžić said that their mutual tendency towards art, his being poetry and hers being music, was what initially sparked their attraction. They live in Sarajevo.

== Discography ==
- Selma (1999)
- Uzmi ili ostavi (2000)
- Za cijeli svijet (2001)
- Tebi suđena (2003)
- Moje Sarajevo (2005)
- Novi dan (2006)
