= Staša Košarac =

Bosnian Serb politician (born 1975)

- Сташа Кошарац
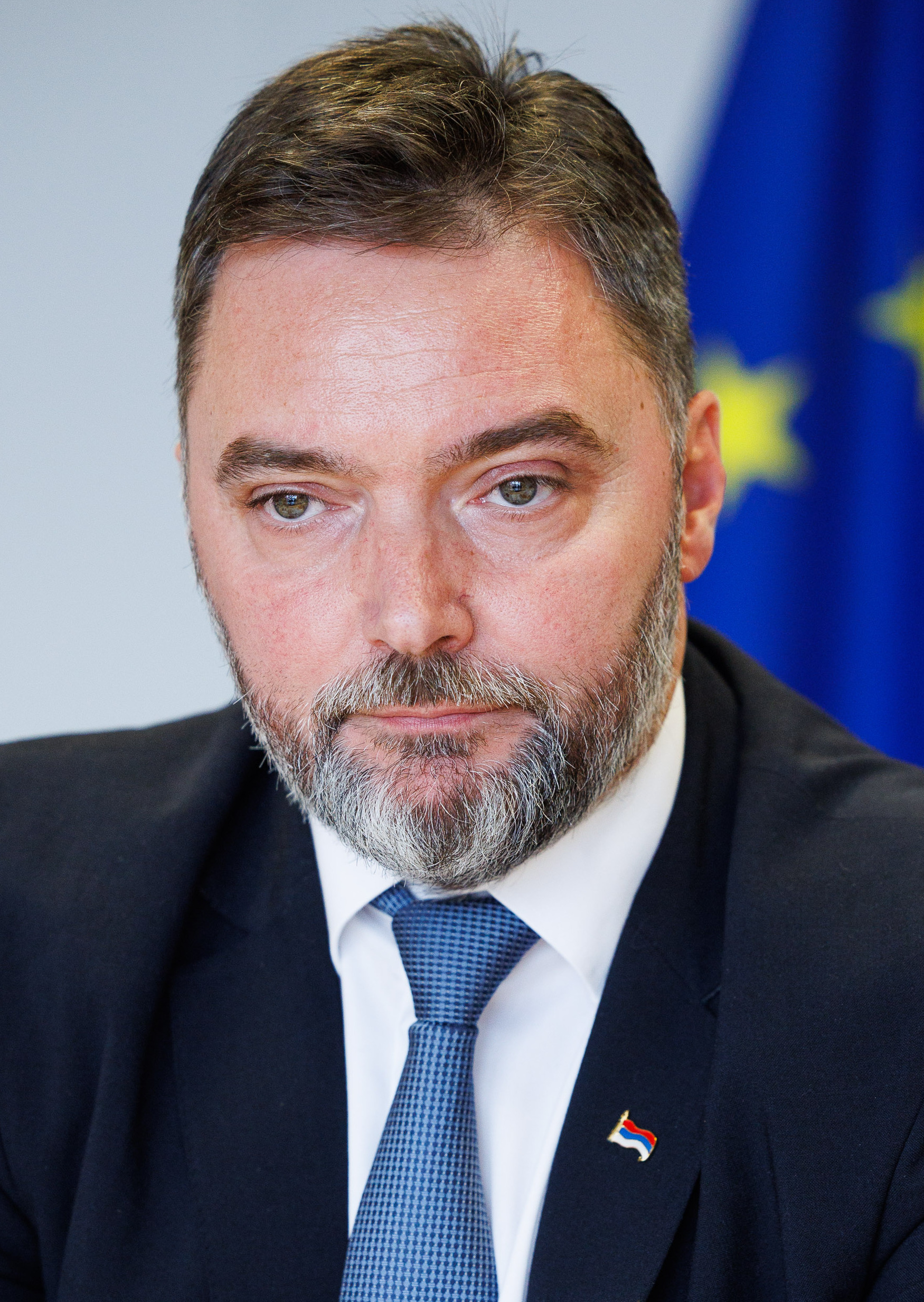
- Košarac in 2023

Minister of Foreign Trade and Economic Relations
- Incumbent
- Assumed office 23 December 2019
- Prime Minister: Zoran Tegeltija; Borjana Krišto
- Preceded by: Mirko Šarović
Parliamentary offices
Member of the House of Representatives
In office 9 December 2014 – 23 December 2019
| Constituency | 3rd Electoral Unit RS |
Member of the House of Peoples
In office 9 June 2011 – 9 December 2014

Personal details
- Born: 19 March 1975 (age 51) Sarajevo, SR Bosnia and Herzegovina, SFR Yugoslavia
- Party: Alliance of Independent Social Democrats (1998–present)
- Spouses: Tanja Tanović (divorced) Sanja Stanković (divorced) Aleksandra Ivković (m. 2021)
- Children: 4
- Education: Union University (BBA)

Staša Košarac (Serbian Cyrillic: Сташа Кошарац; born 19 March 1975) is a Bosnian Serb politician serving as Minister of Foreign Trade and Economic Relations since December 2019. He is also the current Vice-chairman of the Council of Ministers of Bosnia and Herzegovina, serving alongside Zukan Helez. He was previously a member of the national House of Representatives.

Košarac was born in Sarajevo in 1975. He has been a member of the Alliance of Independent Social Democrats since 1998. Košarac was elected to the National Assembly of Republika Srpska in 2004. He was a member of the national House of Peoples from 2011 to 2014. He was elected to the national House of Representatives in the 2014 general election. Re-elected in the 2018 general election, Košarac served as member of the House of Representatives until December 2019, when he was appointed Minister of Foreign Trade and Economic Relations.

== Early life ==
Košarac was born on 19 March 1975 to Bosnian Serb parents Milorad and Zoranka in Sarajevo, where he finished elementary and then high school Đuro Pucar Stari in Vogošća. In 2014, he earned a degree in business administration from Union University in Belgrade.

== Political career ==
Košarac is a member of the Alliance of Independent Social Democrats, and got his first public position when he was 25 years old as a councilor in the Municipal Assembly of Višegrad. In 2004, he got elected to the National Assembly of Republika Srpska. In January 2010, he became the head of the Team for Coordination of War Crimes Investigation and Search for Missing Persons of Republika Srpska by the decision of the government of Republika Srpska.

In 2011, Košarac became a member of the national House of Peoples. In the 2014 general election, he was elected to a parliamentary seat in the national House of Representatives. He was re-elected to the House of Representatives in the 2018 general election, obtaining over 37,000 votes.

On 23 December 2019, Košarac was appointed as Minister of Foreign Trade and Economic Relations in the cabinet of Zoran Tegeltija. In October 2021, the cabinet, at the proposal of Košarac, drafted a decision on temporary suspension and reduction of customs rates on imports of new electric and hybrid cars until 31 December 2022. He stayed as minister in the cabinet of Borjana Krišto. Additionally, Košarac was appointed as the new vice-chairman of the Council of Ministers on 22 August 2023.

In December 2024, the United States Office of Foreign Assets Control (OFAC) imposed sanctions on Košarac. In October 2025, the United States lifted sanctions against Košarac, Milorad Dodik, and several other officials. According to media reports, the decision followed lobbying efforts by several close allies of U.S. President Donald Trump, including MAGA activist Laura Loomer and former Trump administration officials Rudy Giuliani and Michael Flynn.

== Personal life ==
Košarac was first married to Tanja Tanović, with whom he has a daughter, Minja.

Following their divorce, he married journalist Sanja Stanković, and the couple had two sons, Marko and Uroš. In December 2020, Stanković publicly accused Košarac of threatening her and being unfaithful. While addressing Bosnia and Herzegovina's Temporary Commission on the Judiciary, she later alleged that prosecutors had ignored evidence she submitted in connection with her criminal complaint, including claims that Košarac had assaulted her and attempted to strangle their child. She further stated that her son's testimony had been disregarded in favor of Košarac's statement and alleged that he had threatened to have her declared mentally ill. Her criminal complaint against Košarac and unnamed employees of the Istočno Sarajevo Social Welfare Centre was ultimately dismissed.

On 28 November 2020, Košarac tested positive for COVID-19 during the pandemic in Bosnia and Herzegovina.

After the completion of his second divorce, Košarac married Aleksandra Ivković, who is 17 years younger than him, in Trebinje in October 2021. The couple welcomed a daughter, Iskra, in 2025. They reside in Istočno Sarajevo.

Political offices
| Preceded by Mirko Šarović | Minister of Foreign Trade and Economic Relations; 2019–present | Incumbent |
