= Mile Akmadžić =

Bosnian Croat politician (born 1939)

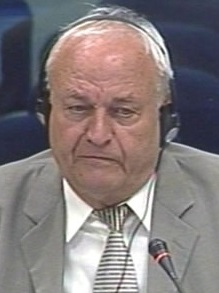
- Akmadžić in 2008

Prime Minister of the Republic of Bosnia and Herzegovina
- In office 9 November 1992 – 25 October 1993
- President: Alija Izetbegović
- Preceded by: Jure Pelivan
- Succeeded by: Haris Silajdžić

Personal details
- Born: 1 October 1939 (age 86) Grude, PR Bosnia and Herzegovina, FPR Yugoslavia
- Party: Croatian Democratic Union
- Spouse: Mijana Akmadžić
- Children: 2
- Education: University of Sarajevo (BS)

Mile Akmadžić (born 1 October 1939) is a Bosnian Croat former politician who served as Prime Minister of the Republic of Bosnia and Herzegovina from 1992 to 1993, during the Bosnian War.

== Early career ==
Akmadžić was born in Grude, PR Bosnia and Herzegovina, FPR Yugoslavia on 1 October 1939. From 1964 through 1978, he worked for Energoinvest, managing international relations. He was an organizer for the 1984 Winter Olympics in Sarajevo, where he received his BS in 1965 from the University of Sarajevo.

== Political career ==
Akmadžić served as Chief of Staff to the Presidency of Bosnia and Herzegovina from 1991 to 1992, having already served in the Presidency since 1978. He was an adviser and secretary to Alija Izetbegović, the first president of the Presidency of the newly independent Republic of Bosnia and Herzegovina. Akmadžić was one of the Croat delegates in the peace plan negotiations during the Bosnian war.

On 9 November 1992, he was appointed Prime Minister of the Republic of Bosnia and Herzegovina, following Jure Pelivan's resignation. Akmadžić was succeeded as prime minister by Haris Silajdžić on 25 October 1993.

== Personal life ==
Akmadžić and his wife Mijana have two children, Ornela and Hrvoje. He speaks English and German fluently.
