= Talal Al-Haj =

Iraqi journalist

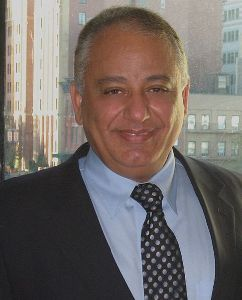
- Born: Baghdad, Iraq
- Occupation: Journalist
- Title: Al Arabiya; NY/U.N Bureau Chief
- Spouse: Anita
- Children: Sharif and Jamal
- Website: http://www.alarabiya.net/english

Talal Al-Haj is an Iraqi journalist. He is the current New York/United Nations Bureau Chief for the Al-Arabiya news network.

== Early life and education ==
Al-Haj moved to England, where he studied and graduated with a Master of Arts (MA) in Broadcast Journalism from the University of Westminster in 1995, whilst working for the BBC in London.

== Early career ==
In the United Kingdom, Al-Haj worked at the BBC for its Arabic News Service. He was based in London for many years before moving to head the U.S. bureau for Al-Jazeera in 1997. As such, Talal Al-Haj was the first Bureau Chief in Washington, D.C. for Al-Jazeera's Satellite Channel. He established the first U.S bureau for Al-Jazeera in the U.S. capitol in 1997, and remained there until October 2000.

In 2002 he was appointed Abu Dhabi TV's Bureau Chief in New York. For two years Al-Haj covered all UN events and deliberations that preceded the March 2003 Iraq war. During this period he conducted numerous exclusive interviews with UN Secretary General Kofi Annan, UNMOVIC, IAEA Chiefs, and many Ambassadors of the permanent and elected member states of the UN Security Council.

== Career at Al-Arabiya ==
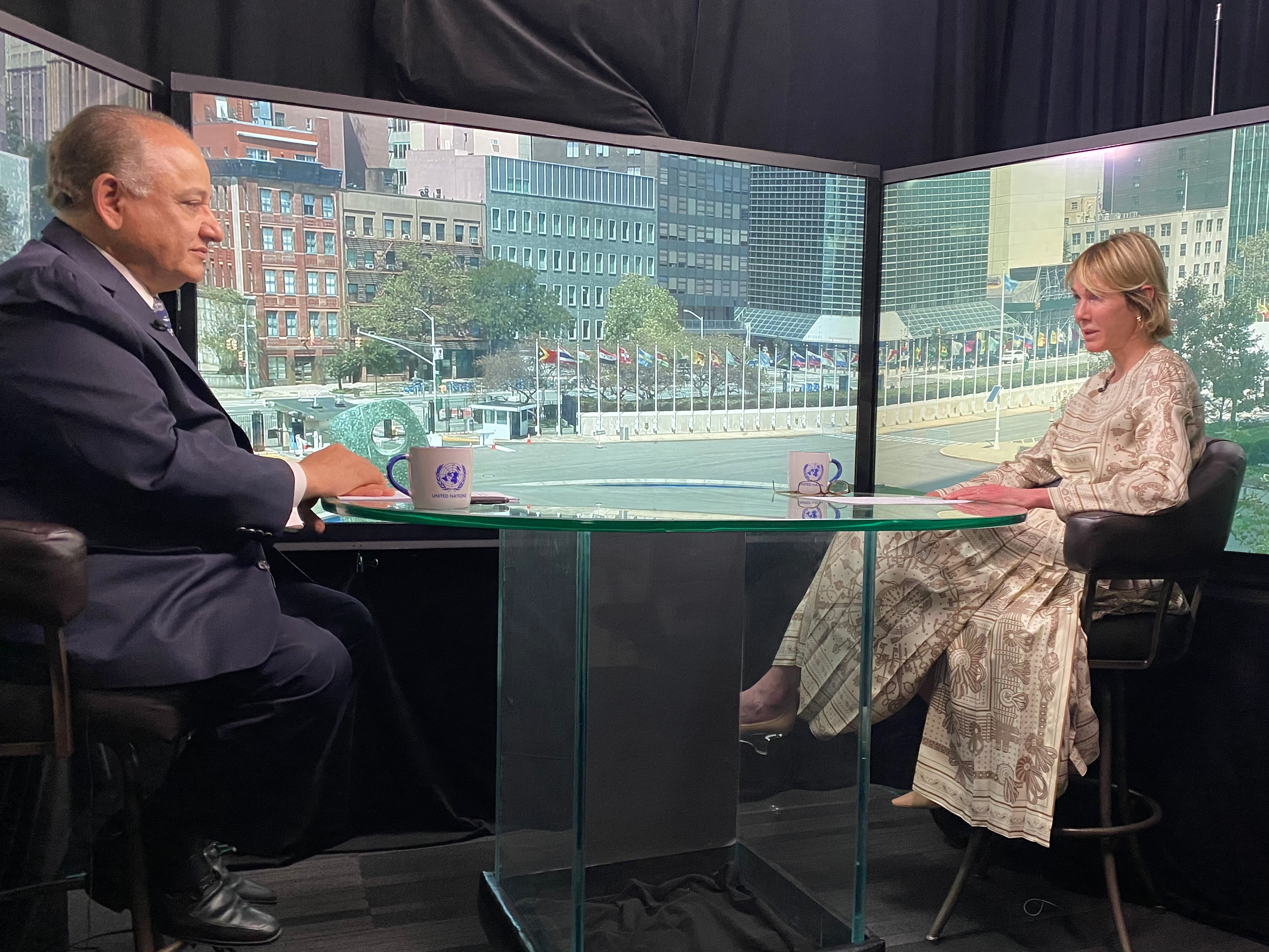
Talal Al-Haj interviewing US Ambassador to the United Nations Kelly Craft, 2020.

In April 2006 Al-Haj conducted a one-on-one 22-minute exclusive interview with former U.S Secretary of Defense Donald Rumsfeld amid calls from retired generals for him to resign.

In August 2006 Al-Haj's reporting on the First Mehlis 1st report on Hariri’s murder was nominated for the finals in the International Emmys "Breaking News Category." This made him the first Arab journalist to be nominated for a television News Emmy. He is also a blue ribbon judge in the International Emmys, in which he judges the finalists.

In November 2007 he won a United Nations UNCA Gold Award for Electronic UN Coverage (Television). This made Al-Haj the first Arab journalist to win a UNCA Gold Award (or a UNCA award of any kind) for his press coverage of the UN.

In 2010 Talal Al-Haj won again UNCA Gold Award for best Broadcast Coverage of the UN and its agencies.

Early morning on 10 July 2008 Al-Haj broke the story on Al-Arabiya of the up-and-coming indictment of President Omar Bashir of Sudan on crimes against humanity, war crimes, and genocide in Darfur. The story was then followed worldwide and was later announced on 14 July 2008 by the International Criminal Court in the Hague, Netherlands.

Al-Haj continues to work for Al-Arabiya as their NY/U.N bureau Chief based at the United Nations in New York.

== Achievements ==
He has been an accredited correspondent at the White House, Congress, U.S. Department of State, the Pentagon, the United Nations, and the New York City Police Department.

Al-Haj holds the record of 8 sit-down interviews with SG Kofi Annan, including the last TV sit-down interview Annan gave before leaving office after 10 years as Secretary General of the U.N on Dec 22, 2006.

Al-Haj has posed questions to and conducted interviews with, a wide range of political figures including, President George W. Bush, President Bill Clinton, President Hosni Mubarak of Egypt, the late Palestinian President Yasser Arafat, President Mahmoud Abbas, Vice President Ali Othman Taha of Sudan, Prime Minister Ariel Sharon, former Prime Minister Ehud Barak, former State secretaries Madeleine Albright, Colin Powell, and Condoleezza Rice. He also interviewed former Deputy Defense Secretary John Hambre, former Under Secretary of Defense Walter B. Slocombe, former President of Israel Moshe Katsav, Ambassador Kelly Craft, and Ambassador John Bolton. He also interviewed many Arab and world leaders such as Yemeni President Ali Abdullah Salih. As well as several Arab foreign ministers that include countries such as Saudi Arabia, Egypt, Iraq, Sudan, and Syria.
