= Independent Bloc (Bosnia and Herzegovina) =

Bosniak political party

Independent Bloc Nezavisni blok Независни блок
- President: Senad Šepić
- Founded: 10 September 2017; 8 years ago
- Split from: Party of Democratic Action
- Headquarters: Sarajevo
- Ideology: Civic nationalism Conservatism; Pro-Europeanism
- Political position: Centre to Centre-right
- HoR BiH: 0 / 42
- HoP BiH: 0 / 15
- HoR FBiH: 0 / 98
- HoP FBiH: 0 / 80
- NA RS: 0 / 83

Website
- nezavisniblok.ba

The Independent Bloc (Bosnian: Nezavisni blok / Cyrillic: Независни блок, abbreviated NB/НБ) is a centrist and conservative political party in Bosnia and Herzegovina. Its current leader is Senad Šepić.

== History ==
The Independent Bloc was founded in 2017 after three SDA members of the House of Representatives, Senad Šepić, Sadik Ahmetović and Salko Sokolović, received warnings from SDA's president Bakir Izetbegović that they will be removed from the party because they voted against increasing excise taxes for petroleum and petroleum products. Not willing to vote on the excise taxes SDA removed Šepić and gave a "penalty card" to the other two. Not long after all of them left the party and formed the delegates club of the Independent Bloc which would soon after become a separate political party.

== List of presidents ==
#	Name (Born–Died)	Portrait	Term of Office	
1	Senad Šepić (b. 1977)		10 September 2017	present

== Elections ==
=== Parliamentary elections ===
Parliamentary Assembly of Bosnia and Herzegovina
Year	#	Popular vote	%	HoR	Seat change	HoP	Seat change	Government
2018	11th	41,512	2.51	1 / 42	New	0 / 15	New	Opposition
2022 (Note: Run in coalition with PzP.)	15th	25,007	1.57	0 / 42	▼1	0 / 15	0	Extra-parliamentary

=== Presidency elections ===
Presidency of Bosnia and Herzegovina
Election year	#	Candidate	Votes	%	Representing	Elected?
2018	5th	Senad Šepić	29,922	5.15%	Bosniaks	No
