= Jure Pelivan =

Bosnian Croat politician and economist (1928–2014)

Prime Minister of the Republic of Bosnia and Herzegovina
- In office 3 March 1992 – 9 November 1992
- Preceded by: Office established
- Succeeded by: Mile Akmadžić

13th President of the Executive Council of SR Bosnia and Herzegovina
- In office 20 December 1990 – 3 March 1992
- Deputy: Jadranko Prlić (1990–1991)
- Preceded by: Marko Ćeranić
- Succeeded by: Office abolished
Additional positions
Governor of the National Bank of SR Bosnia and Herzegovina
In office
1987 – 1990

Personal details
- Born: 1 December 1928 Livno, Kingdom of Serbs, Croats and Slovenes
- Died: 18 July 2014 (aged 85) Split, Croatia
- Party: Croatian Democratic Union (1990–2014)
- Other political affiliations: SKJ (until 1990)

Jure Pelivan (pronounced [jǔːre pěliʋaːn]; 1 December 1928 – 18 July 2014) was a Bosnian Croat politician and economist who served as the last Prime Minister of the Socialist Republic of Bosnia and Herzegovina from 1990 to 1992, during the end of the Yugoslav era. He then served as the first Prime Minister of the independent Republic of Bosnia and Herzegovina from March to November 1992. Pelivan was a member of the Croatian Democratic Union.

== Early life ==
Jure Pelivan was born on 1 December 1928 in the village of Orguz, which is located near Livno. He was ethnically Croat. When he was still active in economics, he served as director of the branch in Livno and Deputy Governor for the Central Bank of Bosnia and Herzegovina.

== Political career ==
Pelivan represented Mostar in the National Assembly in the early 1990s. From December 1990 to March 1992, he served as president of the Executive Council. He announced his resignation in April 1992 from this position, with the government remaining in office until the next election, which did not take place due to the start of the Bosnian War. Pelivan then served as the inaugural prime minister of the newly independent Republic of Bosnia and Herzegovina. During his premiership, he criticized Bosnian Army general Sefer Halilović and war-time Bosnian Presidency member Ejup Ganić for what he perceived as Muslims allegedly heading the army. Pelivan also repeatedly resisted attempts for him to step down, saying it was being used to overthrow his party in the next election.

== Later career ==
An economist, Pelivan served as board member of the Central Bank of Bosnia and Herzegovina for eight years following the end of the Bosnian War in late 1995. As board member, he engaged in the introduction of the Bosnia and Herzegovina convertible mark, which was initially pegged to the Deutsche Mark, and was then pegged to the euro in 2002. Pelivan retired from the bank in September 2007. He moved to neighboring Split, Croatia in 2007, where he resided for the remainder of his life. He died in Split on 18 July 2014, at the age of 85.
