= Boro Bosić =

Bosnian Serb politician

- Боро Босић

Co-chairman of the Council of Ministers of Bosnia and Herzegovina
- In office 3 January 1997 – 3 February 1999 Serving with Haris Silajdžić
- President: Alija Izetbegović; Živko Radišić; Ante Jelavić
- Preceded by: Office established
- Succeeded by: Svetozar Mihajlović

Personal details
- Born: 17 June 1950 (age 75) Šamac, PR Bosnia and Herzegovina, FPR Yugoslavia
- Party: Serb Democratic Party

Boro Bosić (born 17 June 1950) is a Bosnian Serb politician who served as Co-Chairman of the Council of Ministers of Bosnia and Herzegovina from 1997 to 1999, serving alongside Haris Silajdžić.

Bosić served as the first Minister of Industry and Energy of Republika Srpska from 1993 to 1995, during most of the Bosnian War. He is a member of the Serb Democratic Party.
