= Nikola Špirić =

Chairman of the Council of Ministers of Bosnia and Herzegovina from 2007 to 2012

- Никола Шпирић
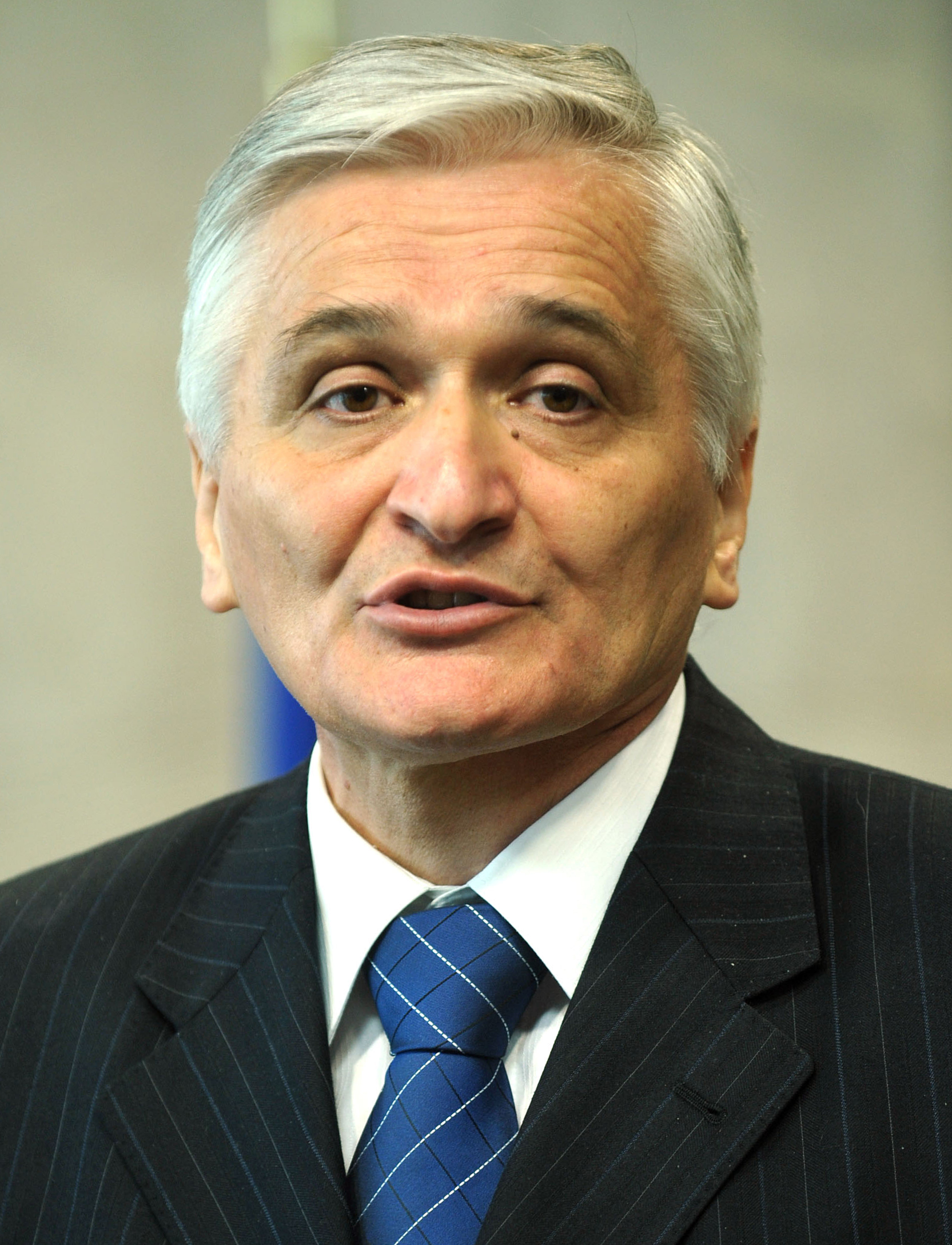
- Špirić in 2008

Chairman of the Council of Ministers of Bosnia and Herzegovina
- In office 11 January 2007 – 12 January 2012
- President: See list: Haris Silajdžić Bakir Izetbegović Nebojša Radmanović Željko Komšić
- Preceded by: Adnan Terzić
- Succeeded by: Vjekoslav Bevanda

Member of the House of Peoples
- Incumbent
- Assumed office 28 February 2019
- In office 20 March 2001 – 31 January 2003

Minister of Finance and Treasury
- In office 12 January 2012 – 31 March 2015
- Prime Minister: Vjekoslav Bevanda
- Preceded by: Dragan Vrankić
- Succeeded by: Vjekoslav Bevanda
Parliamentary offices
Member of the House of Representatives
In office 9 December 2002 – 11 January 2007
Constituency	1st Electoral Unit RS

Personal details
- Born: 4 September 1956 (age 70) Drvar, PR Bosnia and Herzegovina, FPR Yugoslavia
- Party: Alliance of Independent Social Democrats (2002–present)
- Other political affiliations: Party of Democratic Progress (2000–2002)
- Spouse: Nada Špirić
- Children: 2
- Education: University of Sarajevo (BEc, MEc, PhD)
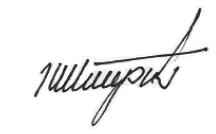
- Signature

Nikola Špirić (Serbian Cyrillic: Никола Шпирић, pronounced [nǐkola ʃpǐːrit͡ɕ]; born 4 September 1956) is a Bosnian Serb politician who served as Chairman of the Council of Ministers of Bosnia and Herzegovina from 2007 to 2012. He has served as a member of the national House of Peoples since 2019.

Špirić also served as Minister of Finance and Treasury from 2012 to 2015. He was previously a member of the national House of Representatives from 2002 to 2007. Initially a member of the Party of Democratic Progress, he left the party in 2002 to join the Alliance of Independent Social Democrats.

Špirić is Bosnia and Herzegovina's longest-serving head of government since the end of the Bosnian War.

== Early life and education ==
Špirić was born in Drvar, PR Bosnia and Herzegovina, at the time FPR Yugoslavia. He completed elementary education in his hometown, high school in Sarajevo and his undergraduate and postgraduate education at the University of Sarajevo. He holds a PhD in economics. His doctoral thesis was in monetary and public finance.

== Early career ==
Špirić has been an economics professor at the University of Banja Luka since 1992. He held a number of governmental positions, including a 2-year term as a representative at the Parliamentary Assembly of Bosnia and Herzegovina for Milorad Dodik's SNSD party. He was a member of the House of Peoples from 2001 until 2003 and a member of the House of Representatives from 2002 until 2007.

== Chairman of the Council of Ministers (2007–2012) ==
On 11 January 2007, Špirić became the new Chairman of the Council of Ministers of Bosnia and Herzegovina, succeeding Adnan Terzić. On 1 November 2007, he tendered his resignation in protest at parliamentary reforms imposed by High Representative Miroslav Lajčák. Špirić felt that the reforms would reduce the influence of Bosnia's Serb population. The resignation was deemed by some to be the country's most serious crisis since the end of the Bosnian War. After the crisis was resolved, he was renominated for the Chairman's post on 10 December 2007, confirmed by the Presidency on 27 December 2007 and by Parliament a day later.

Špirić's government led Bosnia and Herzegovina's economic recovery following the Great Recession and the 2008 financial crisis.

On 26 May 2008, Špirić met with European Commissioner for Justice, Freedom and Security Jacques Barrot, discussing the abolition of the European Union visa regime for Bosnian citizens. In September 2009, his government managed to succeed in its plans and Bosnia and Herzegovina met the conditions for visa waiver.

In July 2009, Špirić's cabinet approved the Law Against Discrimination. Intended to address LGBTQ rights in Bosnia and Herzegovina, the law prohibits discrimination based on sex, gender expression and sexual orientation. It also forbids harassment and segregation on the basis of sexual orientation.

On 12 January 2012, he was succeeded as Chairman of the Council of Ministers by Vjekoslav Bevanda, following the 2010 general election and the one-year governmental formation crisis.

== Later career ==
From January 2012 until March 2015, Špirić served as Minister of Finance and Treasury in the cabinet of Vjekoslav Bevanda.

In September 2018, the United States Department of State imposed sanctions (a travel ban and asset freeze) on Špirić, with the justification that he "engaged in and benefited from public corruption, including the acceptance of improper benefits in exchange for the performance of public functions and interference with public processes, during his tenure as a member of the House of Representatives in Bosnia and Herzegovina." Špirić accused the U.S. Ambassador in Bosnia and Herzegovina of harming his chances of re-election.

Since February 2019, Špirić has once again been a member of the House of Peoples. In September 2020, he was appointed member of the Parliamentary Committee for the selection and monitoring of the work of the Bosnian Agency for the Prevention of Corruption and Coordination of the Fight against Corruption (APIK). This raised criticism given that he remains under U.S. sanctions for corruption.

== Personal life ==
Špirić is married and has two children. On 18 January 2021, he was admitted to hospital due to bilateral pneumonia.

Political offices
Preceded by Adnan Terzić	Chairman of the Council of Ministers of Bosnia and Herzegovina; 2007–2012	Succeeded by Vjekoslav Bevanda
Preceded by Dragan Vrankić	Minister of Finance and Treasury; 2012–2015	Succeeded by Vjekoslav Bevanda
