= Sredoje Nović =

Bosnian Serb politician (born 1947)

- Средоје Новић
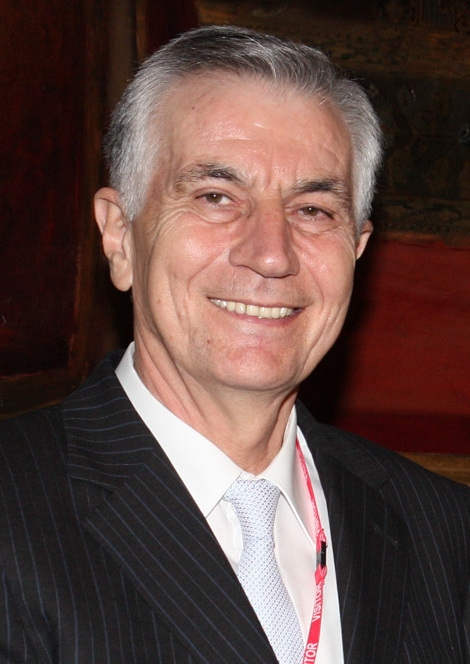
- Nović in 2013

Member of the House of Peoples
- Incumbent
- Assumed office 31 March 2015

Minister of Civil Affairs
- In office 11 January 2007 – 31 March 2015
- Prime Minister: Nikola Špirić; Vjekoslav Bevanda
- Preceded by: Safet Halilović
- Succeeded by: Adil Osmanović

Personal details
- Born: 14 February 1947 (age 79) Derventa, PR Bosnia and Herzegovina, FPR Yugoslavia
- Party: Alliance of Independent Social Democrats (2007–present)
- Spouse: Gina Nović
- Children: 2
- Education: University of Sarajevo (LLB, LLM)

Sredoje Nović (born 14 February 1947) is a Bosnian Serb politician serving as member of the national House of Peoples since 2015. He previously served as Minister of Civil Affairs from 2007 to 2015.

Nović has been a member of the Alliance of Independent Social Democrats since 2007. He also served as the first director of the State Investigation and Protection Agency (SIPA) from 2002 to 2007.

== Early life and education ==
Born in Derventa, PR Bosnia and Herzegovina, FPR Yugoslavia on 14 February 1947, Nović graduated from the Faculty of Law of the University of Sarajevo.

== Career ==
Nović joined the Alliance of Independent Social Democrats ahead of taking over the office of Minister of Civil Affairs in 2007. At the same time, he became a member of the Main and Executive Boards of the party.

He spent most of his career in police and security services. He got his first job in 1970 in Kragujevac's "Red Flag", and two years later he got a job in the SUP of the Socialist Republic Bosnia and Herzegovina, where he remained for three years. Nović then became the Secretary for the Protection of the Constitutional Order in the Presidency of Bosnia and Herzegovina, and in 1983 he became the Assistant Secretary for Internal Affairs of the Republic SUP. From this position, he moved to the position of Undersecretary of the State Security Service of the Socialist Republic of Bosnia and Herzegovina in 1989.

During the Bosnian War, Nović moved to Banja Luka, where he worked as a commercial director in a private company and a professor at the High School of Internal Affairs. In 1998, he was appointed head of the Republika Srpska State Security Service. He was never a candidate in any Bosnian elections, but was elected minister three times: first in 1998 as Minister of the Police of Republika Srpska, then in 2007 and 2012 as Minister of Civil Affairs.

Also, from 2002 to 2007, Nović was the first director of the State Investigation and Protection Agency (SIPA). While director of SIPA, he enjoyed the support of Paddy Ashdown, the High Representative for Bosnia and Herzegovina. As director, he showed a high degree of professionalism, legality in work and ability to build relationships of national institutions.

Nović was not a candidate at the 2014 general election, but was subsequently appointed to the national House of Peoples. He was re-appointed to the post in February 2019.

== Personal life ==
Sredoje is married to Gina Nović and together they have two daughters. They live in Banja Luka.

Political offices
Preceded by Safet Halilović	Minister of Civil Affairs; 2007–2015	Succeeded by Adil Osmanović
