= Ministry of Foreign Trade and Economic Relations (Bosnia and Herzegovina) =

Government ministry of Bosnia and Herzegovina

Ministry of Foreign Trade and Economic Relations of Bosnia and Herzegovina
- Ministarstvo vanjske trgovine i ekonomskih odnosa Bosne i Hercegovine; Министарство спољне трговине и економских односа Босне и Херцеговине
- Coat of arms of Bosnia and Herzegovina

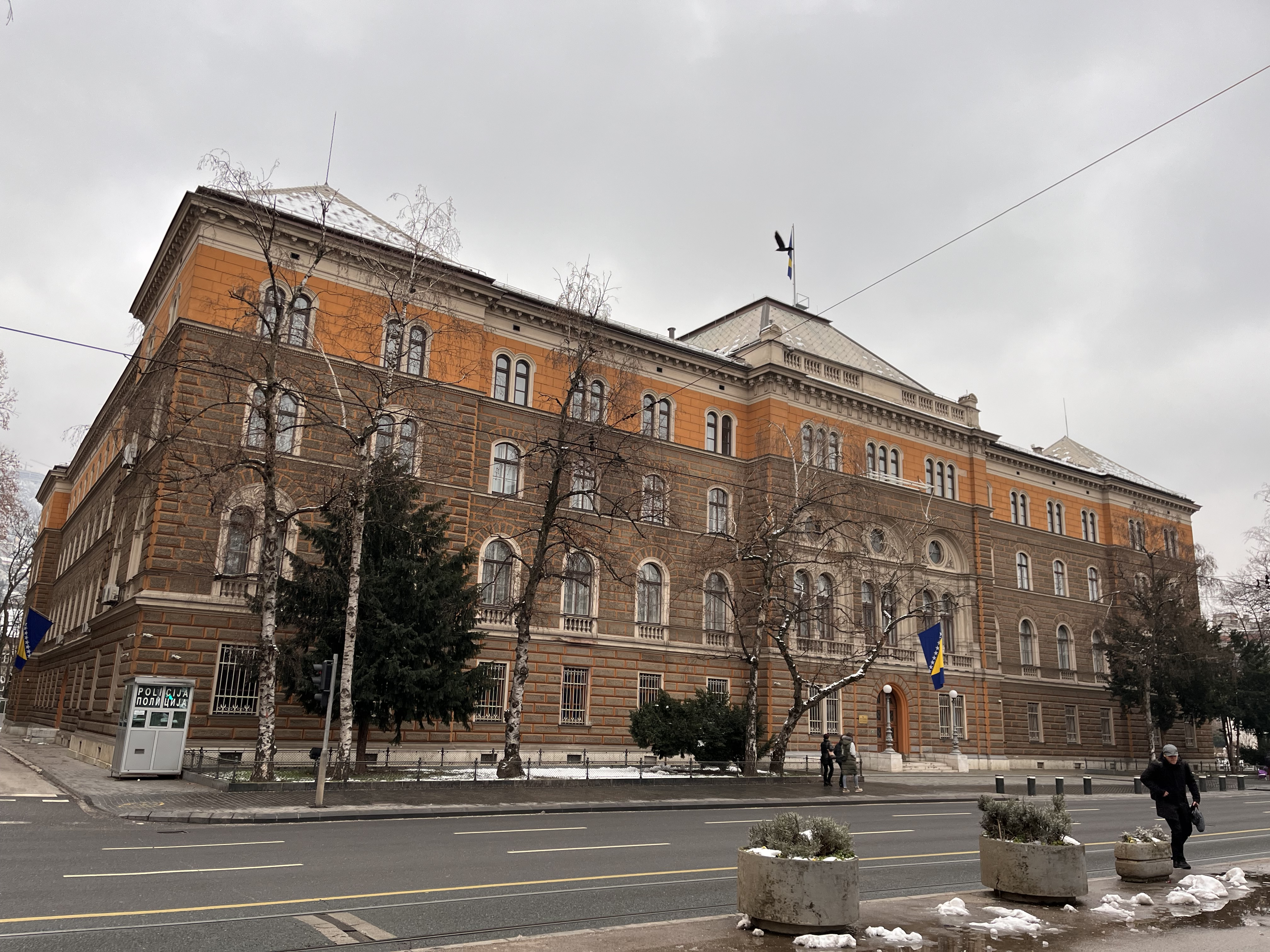
- Building of the Presidency of Bosnia and Herzegovina, seat of the Ministry of Foreign Trade and Economic Relations of Bosnia and Herzegovina

Department overview
- Formed: 1997
- Headquarters: Sarajevo
- Minister responsible: Staša Košarac
- Website: http://mvteo.gov.ba/

The Ministry of Foreign Trade and Economic Relations of Bosnia and Herzegovina (Serbo-Croatian: Ministarstvo vanjske trgovine i ekonomskih odnosa Bosne i Hercegovine / Министарство спољне трговине и економских односа Босне и Херцеговине) is the governmental department in charge of foreign trade policy and economic relations of Bosnia and Herzegovina.

== History ==
The Ministry of Foreign Trade and Economic Relations of Bosnia and Herzegovina was established in the first post-war 1996 Bosnian general election, while the ministry began its work on 3 January 1997, headed by minister Hasan Muratović (SDA), after the first post-war government in Bosnia and Herzegovina was proclaimed between the Party of Democratic Action (SDA), the Croatian Democratic Union (HDZ BiH) and the Serb Democratic Party (SDS), also headed by Muratović.

== Organization ==
The Ministry of Foreign Trade and Economic Relations of Bosnia and Herzegovina is organized into seven sectors, which are reorganized into a total of 32 departments, and one inspectorate.

- Sector for Foreign Trade Policy and Foreign Investments (6 departments)
- Sector for International Trade Relations (4 departments)
- Sector for Customs Policy and Tariffs (3 departments)
- Sector for Economic Development and Entrepreneurship (4 departments)
- Sector for Natural Resources, Energy and Environmental Protection (6 departments)
- Sector for Legal and General Affairs (5 departments)
- Agriculture, Food, Forestry and Rural Development Sector (4 departments)
- Inspectorate

== List of ministers ==
=== Ministers of Foreign Trade and Economic Relations of Bosnia and Herzegovina (1997–present) ===
Political parties:
Party of Democratic Action (SDA)
Party for Bosnia and Herzegovina (SBiH)
Croatian Democratic Union of Bosnia and Herzegovina (HDZ BiH)
Alliance of Independent Social Democrats (SNSD)
Serb Democratic Party (SDS)

No.	Portrait	Minister of Foreign Trade and Economic Relations	Took office	Left office	Time in office	Party
1	Hasan Muratović	Hasan Muratović (1940–2020)	3 January 1997	4 February 1999	2 years, 32 days	SDA
2	Mirsad Kurtović	Mirsad Kurtović (1950–2022)	4 February 1999	22 February 2001	2 years, 18 days	SDA
3	Azra Hadžiahmetović	Azra Hadžiahmetović (born 1956)	22 February 2001	23 December 2002	1 year, 304 days	SBiH
4	Mila Gadžić	Mila Gadžić	23 December 2002	12 August 2003	232 days	HDZ BiH
5	Dragan Doko	Dragan Doko	12 August 2003	11 January 2007	3 years, 152 days	HDZ BiH
6	Slobodan Puhalac	Slobodan Puhalac (born 1941)	11 January 2007	30 June 2008	1 year, 171 days	SNSD
7	Mladen Zirojević	Mladen Zirojević	30 August 2008	12 January 2012	3 years, 196 days	SNSD
8	Mirko Šarović	Mirko Šarović (born 1956)	12 January 2012	24 October 2013	1 year, 285 days	SDS
9	Boris Tučić	Boris Tučić	5 December 2013	22 January 2015	1 year, 49 days	SNSD
(8)	Mirko Šarović	Mirko Šarović (born 1956)	31 March 2015	23 December 2019	4 years, 267 days	SDS
10	Staša Košarac	Staša Košarac (born 1975)	23 December 2019	Incumbent	6 years, 330 days	SNSD
