= Ministry of Civil Affairs (Bosnia and Herzegovina) =

Government ministry of Bosnia and Herzegovina

Ministry of Civil Affairs of Bosnia and Herzegovina
- Ministarstvo civilnih poslova Bosne i Hercegovine; Министарство цивилних послова Босне и Херцеговине

- Greece–Bosnia and Herzegovina Friendship Building, seat of the Ministry of Civil Affairs of Bosnia and Herzegovina

Department overview
- Formed: 2002
- Headquarters: Sarajevo
- Minister responsible: Dubravka Bošnjak
- Website: http://mcp.gov.ba/

The Ministry of Civil Affairs of Bosnia and Herzegovina (Serbo-Croatian: Ministarstvo civilnih poslova Bosne i Hercegovine / Министарство цивилних послова Босне и Херцеговине) is the governmental department which oversees civil affairs of the citizens of Bosnia and Herzegovina.

== History ==
After the end of the Bosnian War in 1995, the 1996 Bosnian general election and the formation of the first post-war government in Bosnia and Herzegovina in 1997, the Ministry of Civil Affairs and Communications of Bosnia and Herzegovina began working with Spasoje Albijanić (SDS) at the head, which is the predecessor of today's Ministry of Communication and Traffic of Bosnia and Herzegovina and Ministry of Civil Affairs of Bosnia and Herzegovina.

After the 2002 Bosnian general election and the formation of the new government of Bosnia and Herzegovina between the Party of Democratic Action (SDA), the Serbian Democratic Party (SDS) and the Croatian Democratic Union of Bosnia and Herzegovina (HDZ BiH), headed by Adnan Terzić (SDA), the Ministry of Civil Affairs and Communications of Bosnia and Herzegovina was divided into the Ministry of Communication and Traffic of Bosnia and Herzegovina with Branko Dokić (PDP) becoming Minister and the Ministry of Civil Affairs of Bosnia and Herzegovina with Safet Halilović (SBiH) as Minister.

== Organization ==
The Ministry of Civil Affairs of Bosnia and Herzegovina consists of nine organizational units and four commissions.

- Sector for Legal, Personnel and General Affairs of Bosnia and Herzegovina
- Sector for Financial and Material Affairs of Internal Support of Bosnia and Herzegovina
- Sector for Citizenship and Travel Documents of Bosnia and Herzegovina
- Sector for Labor, Employment, Social Protection and Pensions of Bosnia and Herzegovina
- Health sector of Bosnia and Herzegovina
- Sector for Education of Bosnia and Herzegovina
- Sector for Science and Culture of Bosnia and Herzegovina
- Sports sector of Bosnia and Herzegovina
- Sector for Geodetic, Geological and Meteorological Affairs of Bosnia and Herzegovina
- Demining Commission of Bosnia and Herzegovina
- State Border Commission of Bosnia and Herzegovina
- Commission for Coordination of Youth Issues in Bosnia and Herzegovina
- State Commission for Cooperation of Bosnia and Herzegovina with UNESCO

== List of ministers ==
=== Ministers of Civil Affairs and Communication (1997–2002) ===
Political parties:
Serb Democratic Party (SDS)
Alliance of Independent Social Democrats (SNSD)
Socialist Party (SP)

No.	Portrait	Minister of Civil Affairs and Communication	Took office	Left office	Time in office	Party
1	Spasoje Albijanić	Spasoje Albijanić	3 January 1997	3 February 1999	2 years, 31 days	SDS
2	Marko Ašanin	Marko Ašanin (1955–2011)	3 February 1999	22 June 2000	1 year, 140 days	SNSD
3	Tihomir Gligorić	Tihomir Gligorić	22 June 2000	22 February 2001	245 days	SP
4	Svetozar Mihajlović	Svetozar Mihajlović (born 1949)	22 February 2001	23 December 2002	1 year, 304 days	SP

=== Ministers of Civil Affairs (2002–present) ===
Political parties:
Party for Bosnia and Herzegovina (SBiH)
Alliance of Independent Social Democrats (SNSD)
Party of Democratic Action (SDA)
Croatian Democratic Union (HDZ BiH)

No.	Portrait	Minister of Civil Affairs	Took office	Left office	Time in office	Party
1	Safet Halilović	Safet Halilović (1951–2017)	23 December 2002	11 January 2007	4 years, 19 days	SBiH
2	Sredoje Nović	Sredoje Nović (born 1947)	11 January 2007	31 March 2015	8 years, 79 days	SNSD
3	Adil Osmanović	Adil Osmanović (born 1963)	31 March 2015	23 December 2019	4 years, 267 days	SDA
4	Ankica Gudeljević	Ankica Gudeljević (born 1964)	23 December 2019	25 January 2023	3 years, 33 days	HDZ BiH
5	Dubravka Bošnjak	Dubravka Bošnjak (born 1976)	25 January 2023	Incumbent	3 years, 195 days	HDZ BiH
