= Chairman of the Council of Ministers of Bosnia and Herzegovina =

Head of government

- Predsjedavajući Vijeća ministara Bosne i Hercegovine (Bosnian); Предсједавајући Савјета министара Босне и Херцеговине (Serbian)
- Coat of arms of Bosnia and Herzegovina

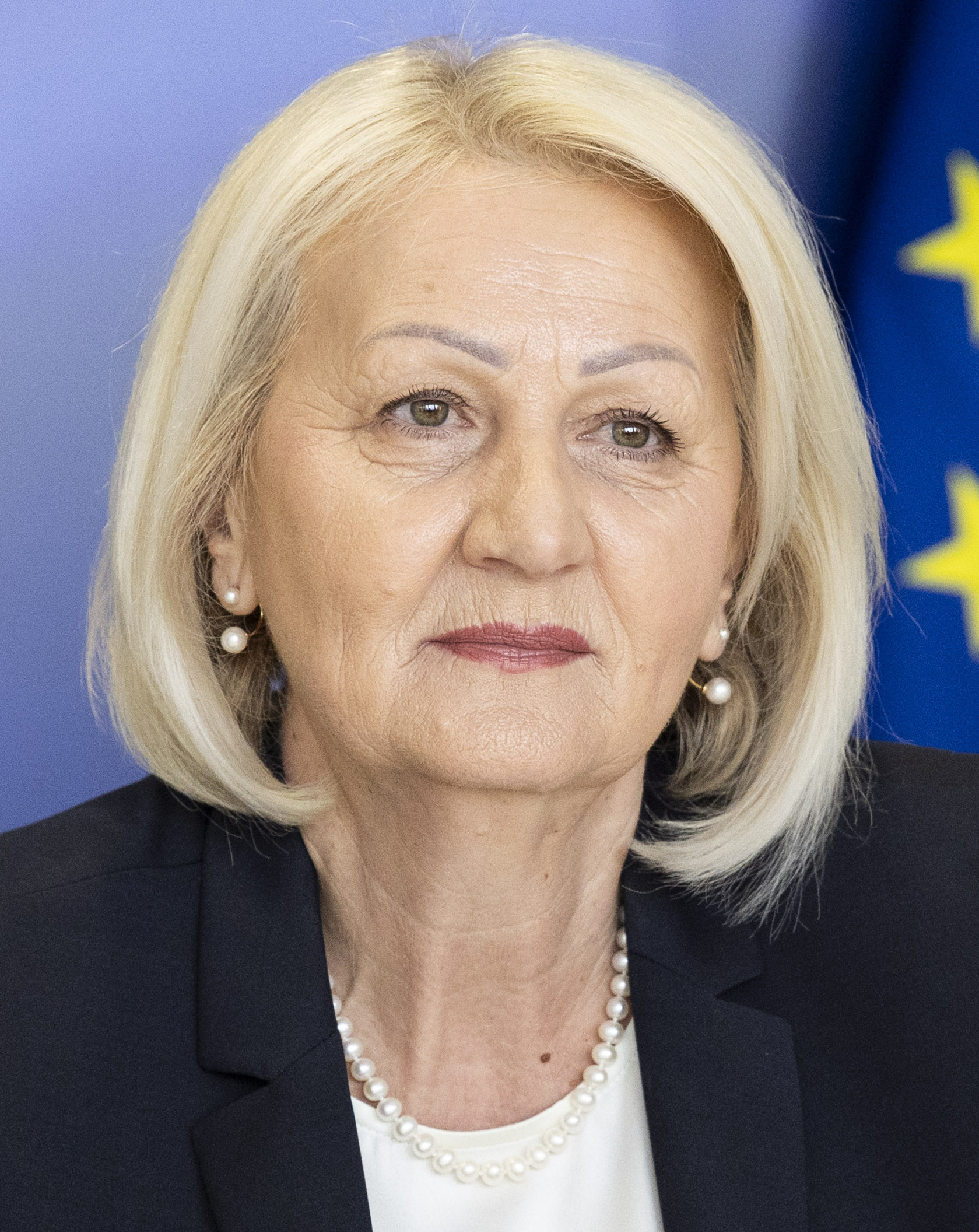
- Incumbent; Borjana Krišto since 25 January 2023
- Council of Ministers of Bosnia and Herzegovina
- Type: Head of government
- Seat: Government Building, Bosnia and Herzegovina Square 1, Sarajevo
- Nominator: Presidency of Bosnia and Herzegovina
- Appointer: House of Representatives
- Term length: No term limit
- Inaugural holder: Haris Silajdžić and Boro Bosić (as Co-Chairmen)
- Formation: 3 January 1997; 29 years ago
- Salary: KM 5,500 / €2,813 per month
- Website: vijeceministara.gov.ba

The chairman of the Council of Ministers of Bosnia and Herzegovina (Bosnian/Croatian: Predsjedavajući Vijeća ministara Bosne i Hercegovine, Serbian: Предсједавајући Савјета министара Босне и Херцеговине) is the head of the government of Bosnia and Herzegovina.

The chairman of the Council of Ministers is nominated by the Presidency of Bosnia and Herzegovina, and appointed by the House of Representatives of Bosnia and Herzegovina. As head of the government, the chairman of the Council of Ministers has no authority for appointing ministers, and their role is that of a coordinator. Ministers are appointed in their stead by the majority-parties according to ethnic and entity representation rules, so that a deputy minister must not be of same ethnicity as the respective minister.

Borjana Krišto is the 11th and current chairwoman of the Council of Ministers. She took office on 25 January 2023, following the 2022 general election. Krišto is the first female occupant of the office.

== Responsibilities ==
The chairman represents the Council of Ministers and is responsible for:

- for harmonizing the work of the Council of Ministers;
- for harmonizing the constitutional relations of the Council of Ministers with the work of the Presidency, the Parliamentary Assembly, as well as with the entities and Brčko District;
- to ensure cooperation between the Council of Ministers and entity governments and lower levels of government;
- for convening sessions of the Council of Ministers;
- for presiding over sessions of the Council of Ministers;
- for the agenda of the sessions of the Council of Ministers;
- for the implementation of decisions of the Council of Ministers;
- for the work of the Directorate for EU integration.

The chairman of the Council of Ministers, in cooperation with their deputies, determines the policy of the work of the Council of Ministers, and especially the priorities and dynamics of the work of the Council of Ministers. They particularly coordinate and monitor the activities of government institutions in Bosnia and Herzegovina related to the Accession of Bosnia and Herzegovina to the European Union.

In order to effectively perform these duties and tasks, the Directorate for EU integration is directly responsible to the chairman of the Council of Ministers. The chairman is responsible for their work to the Parliamentary Assembly and the Presidency.

In case of their absence, the chairman is replaced by one of the vice-chairmen in accordance with the Rules of Procedure.

== Constitutional background ==
The Government Building in Sarajevo, seat of the chairman of the Council of Ministers

Article V.4 of the Constitution defines the Council of Ministers and its responsibilities. The Council of Ministers is composed of the chair of the Council of Ministers and a certain number of ministers as may be appropriate, who are responsible for the implementation of the policy and the decisions of Bosnia and Herzegovina from within the competencies of the institutions of Bosnia and Herzegovina.

The Presidency of Bosnia and Herzegovina appoints the chair of the Council of Ministers of Bosnia and Herzegovina, who assumes the office upon the approval by the House of Representatives of the Parliamentary Assembly of Bosnia and Herzegovina; the chair of the Council of Ministers appoints the Minister of Foreign Affairs, the Minister of Foreign Trade and Economic Relations and other ministers as may be appropriate (no more than two thirds of the ministers may be appointed from the territory of the Federation of Bosnia and Herzegovina), who assume the office upon the approval by the House of Representatives; also, the chair appoints deputy ministers (who may not be from the same constituent people as their ministers), who assume the office upon the approval by the House of Representatives.

== See also ==
- List of heads of government of Bosnia and Herzegovina
- Council of Ministers of Bosnia and Herzegovina
- Presidency of Bosnia and Herzegovina
  - Chairman of the Presidency of Bosnia and Herzegovina
