= Cabinet of Borjana Krišto =

Current Council of Ministers of Bosnia and Herzegovina cabinet

Krišto Cabinet
- 14th Cabinet of Bosnia and Herzegovina
- 2023–present
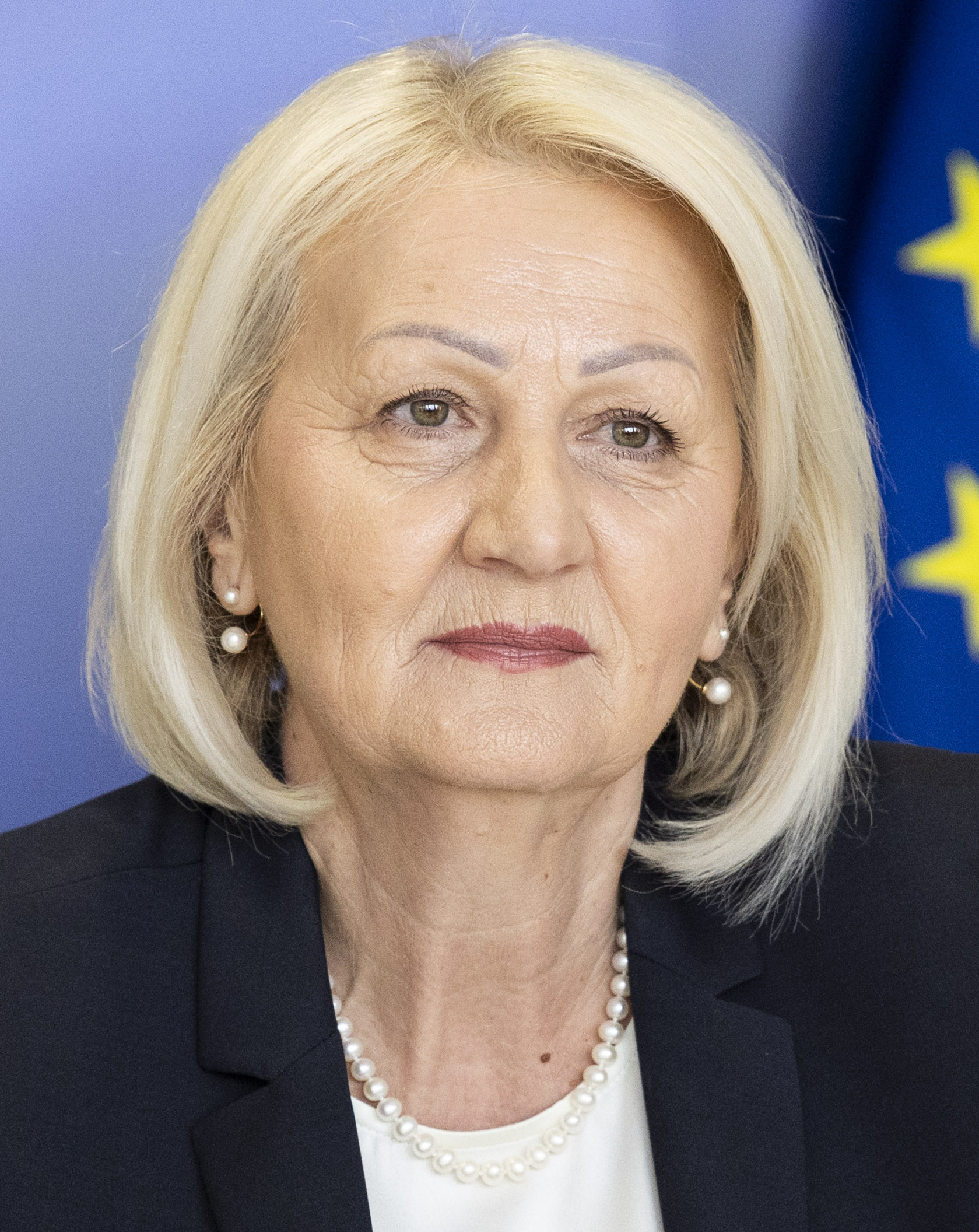
- Date formed: 25 January 2023

People and organisations
- Head of state: Presidency List: Denis Bećirović; Željka Cvijanović; Željko Komšić
- Head of government: Borjana Krišto
- Deputy head of government: Staša Košarac; Zukan Helez
- No. of ministers: 9
- Total no. of members: 10
- Member parties: Croatian Democratic Union; Alliance of Independent Social Democrats; Social Democratic Party; People and Justice; Our Party; Bosnian-Herzegovinian Greens
- Status in legislature: Minority coalition government

History
- Election: 2022 general election
- Legislature term: 2022–2026
- Predecessor: Cabinet of Zoran Tegeltija

The Fourteenth Council of Ministers of Bosnia and Herzegovina (Bosnian and Croatian: Četrnaesti saziv Vijeća ministara Bosne i Hercegovine, Serbian: Четрнаести сазив Савјета министара Босне и Херцеговине / Četrnaesti saziv Savjeta ministara Bosne i Hercegovine) is the current Council of Ministers of Bosnia and Herzegovina cabinet formed on 25 January 2023, following the 2022 general election. It is led by Chairwoman of the Council of Ministers Borjana Krišto.

== Investiture ==
Investiture; Borjana Krišto (HDZ BiH)
Ballot →	25 January 2023
Required majority →	22 out of 42
Yes	23 / 42
No	19 / 42
Abstentions	0 / 42
Absentees	0 / 42

== History ==
Following the 2022 general election, a coalition led by the Alliance of Independent Social Democrats (SNSD), the Croatian Democratic Union (HDZ BiH) and the liberal alliance Troika reached an agreement on the formation of a new government, designating Krišto as the new Chairwoman of the Council of Ministers. The Presidency officially nominated her as chairwoman-designate on 22 December.

The national House of Representatives confirmed Krišto's appointment on 28 December. On 25 January 2023, the House of Representatives confirmed the appointment of Krišto's cabinet.

Krišto's Cabinet is supported by the coalition of the SNSD, the HDZ BiH, Troika and the Bosnian-Herzegovinian Greens. The major opposition is the coalition of the Party of Democratic Action and the Democratic Front. The coalition of the Serb Democratic Party and the Party of Democratic Progress is the major opposition in Republika Srpska.

In January 2025, Troika announced that it was rescinding its support for the coalition with the SNSD, following the latter failing to vote for two laws concentrated on European Union accession. The legislation was ultimately passed with votes from the SNSD's opposition in Republika Srpska. Since then, Krišto has been accused of intentionally ignoring the appointment of Troika-backed Republika Srpska opposition politician Nebojša Vukanović as the new Minister of Security following the office's vacancy in January 2025. Krišto's actions sparked up renewed stories of the SNSD's and HDZ BiH's long-standing relations. Some opposition parties have called for Krišto's resignation and for a vote of no confidence.

=== Cabinet reshuffle ===
On 18 May 2023, Zoran Tegeltija, the Minister of Finance and Treasury and the Vice Chairman of the Council of Ministers, was appointed director of the Indirect Taxation Authority. On 15 June 2023, he was officially confirmed as the new director, therefore resigning from the Krišto Cabinet. On 22 August 2023, Srđan Amidžić was appointed as the new Minister of Finance and Treasury, while Staša Košarac, the Minister of Foreign Trade and Economic Relations, was appointed as the new Vice Chairman of the Council of Ministers.

On 26 December 2024, Nenad Nešić, the Minister of Security, was arrested, and later indicted, as a suspect of conspiracy to commit criminal offenses, money laundering, abuse of official position or authority and accepting bribes. He is also accused of having received a bribe of 250,000 KM in 2019 while serving as director of Putevi Republike Srpske. Following the indictment, Nešić announced he was to resign as minister on 23 January 2025.

Since Nešić's resignation, opposition parties in the national House of Peoples have signed various requests for the dismissal of the remaining SNSD ministers in the cabinet.

== Party breakdown ==
Party breakdown of cabinet ministers:

- Croatian Democratic Union
2
- Alliance of Independent Social Democrats
2
- Social Democratic Party
1
- People and Justice
1
- Our Party
1
- Bosnian-Herzegovinian Greens
1
- Independent
1

== Cabinet members ==
The Cabinet is structured into the offices for the chairwoman of the Council of Ministers, the two vice chairs and 9 ministries.

← Krišto Cabinet → (25 January 2023 – present)
Portfolio	Name	Party	Took office	Left office
Chairwoman of the Council of Ministers	Borjana Krišto	HDZ BiH	25 January 2023	Incumbent
Minister of Foreign Trade and Economic Relations; Vice Chairman of the Council of Ministers	Staša Košarac	SNSD	25 January 2023	Incumbent
Minister of Defence; Vice Chairman of the Council of Ministers	Zukan Helez	SDP BiH	25 January 2023	Incumbent
Minister of Foreign Affairs	Elmedin Konaković	NiP	25 January 2023	Incumbent
Minister of Finance and Treasury	Srđan Amidžić	SNSD	22 August 2023	Incumbent
Minister of Security	Ivica Bošnjak (acting)	HDZ BiH	23 January 2025	Incumbent
Minister of Justice	Davor Bunoza	Independent	25 January 2023	Incumbent
Minister of Civil Affairs	Dubravka Bošnjak	HDZ BiH	25 January 2023	Incumbent
Minister of Communication and Traffic	Edin Forto	NS	25 January 2023	Incumbent
Minister of Human Rights and Refugees	Sevlid Hurtić	BHZ (Note: Nominated by the SNSD.)	25 January 2023	Incumbent
=== Changes June 2023 ===
Portfolio	Name	Party	Took office	Left office
Minister of Finance and Treasury; Vice Chairman of the Council of Ministers	Zoran Tegeltija	SNSD	25 January 2023	15 June 2023
Minister of Security	Nenad Nešić	DNS	25 January 2023	23 January 2025
