= Vjekoslav Bevanda =

Chairman of the Council of Ministers of Bosnia and Herzegovina from 2012 to 2015

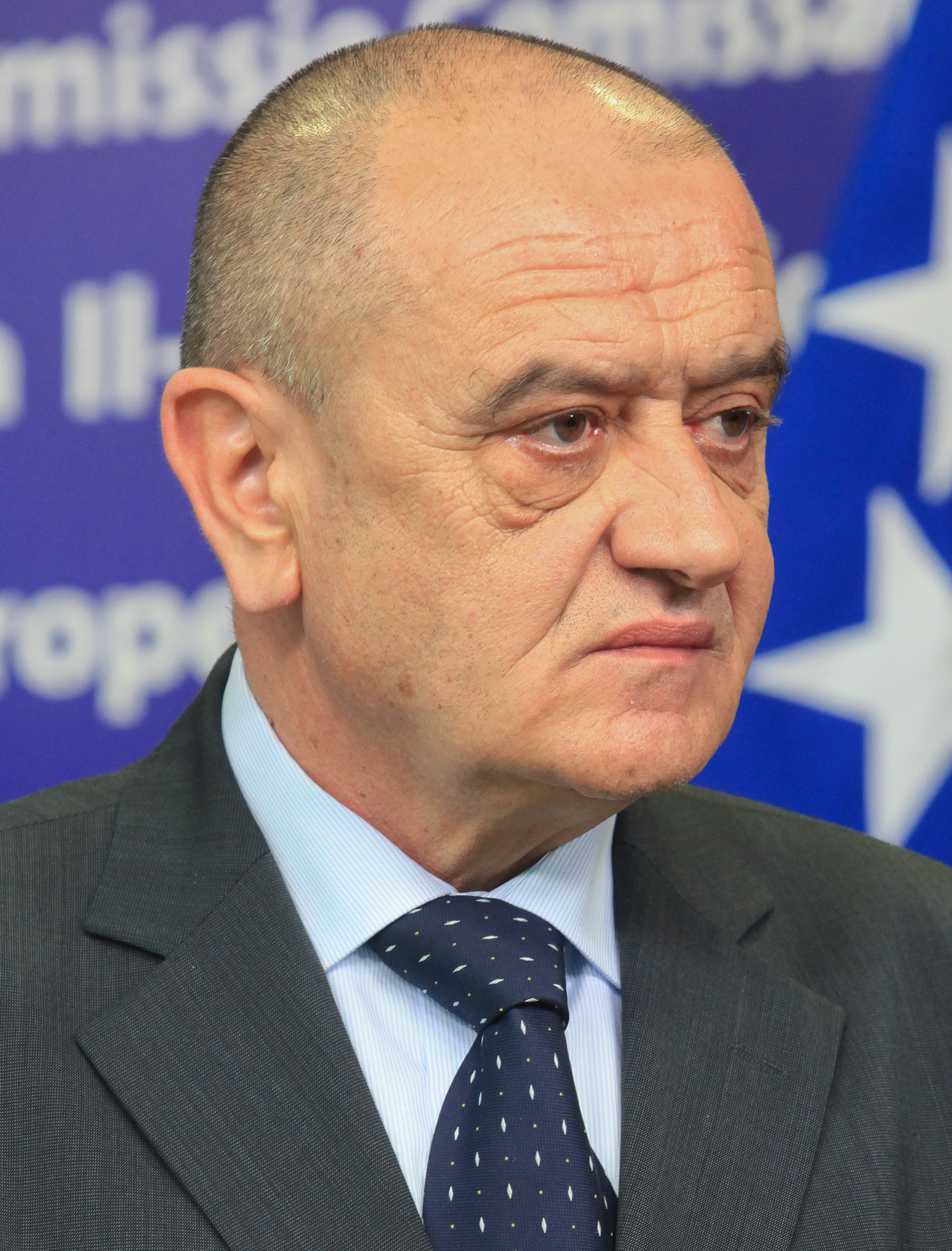
- Bevanda in 2012

Chairman of the Council of Ministers of Bosnia and Herzegovina
- In office 12 January 2012 – 31 March 2015
- President: See list: Bakir Izetbegović Nebojša Radmanović Mladen Ivanić Željko Komšić Dragan Čović
- Preceded by: Nikola Špirić
- Succeeded by: Denis Zvizdić
Ministerial offices
Minister of Finance and Treasury
In office 31 March 2015 – 25 January 2023
Prime Minister	Denis Zvizdić; Zoran Tegeltija
Preceded by	Nikola Špirić
Succeeded by	Zoran Tegeltija
Federal Minister of Finance
In office 30 March 2007 – 17 March 2011
Prime Minister	Nedžad Branković; Mustafa Mujezinović
Preceded by	Dragan Vrankić
Succeeded by	Ante Krajina
Additional positions
Prime Minister of the Federation of Bosnia and Herzegovina
Acting
In office 27 May 2009 – 25 June 2009
President	Borjana Krišto
Preceded by	Nedžad Branković
Succeeded by	Mustafa Mujezinović

Personal details
- Born: 13 May 1956 (age 70) Mostar, PR Bosnia and Herzegovina, FPR Yugoslavia
- Party: Croatian Democratic Union (2007–present)
- Spouse: Ljiljana Bevanda
- Children: 2
- Education: University of Mostar (BEc)

Vjekoslav Bevanda (pronounced [ʋjêkoslaʋ běʋaːnda]; born 13 May 1956) is a Bosnian Croat politician who served as Chairman of the Council of Ministers of Bosnia and Herzegovina from 2012 to 2015. He was subsequently the Minister of Finance and Treasury from 2015 to 2023.

Bevanda served as the Acting Prime Minister of the Federation of Bosnia and Herzegovina in 2009 as well. He was also the Federal Minister of Finance from 2007 to 2011. He is a member of the Croatian Democratic Union.

== Early life and education ==
Born in Mostar, PR Bosnia and Herzegovina, FPR Yugoslavia, on 13 May 1956, Bevanda attended primary and high school in his hometown. He graduated from the Faculty of Economy at the University of Mostar in 1979.

== Early career ==
Between 1979 and 1989, Bevanda worked for the aircraft builder "SOKO" in Mostar. From 1990 to 1993, he worked for the "APRO" bank, also in Mostar. From 2000 until 2001, he worked for the "Euro Center" in Split, and from 2001 to 2007 as a director of the "Commerce Bank" located in Sarajevo.

== Political career ==
A member of the Croatian Democratic Union (HDZ BiH), Bevanda was the Federal Minister of Finance from March 2007 until March 2011. At the same time he was Vice President of the Federal Government. Before that he did various legislative duties for the Federation of Bosnia and Herzegovina. On 27 May 2009, Bevanda was named Acting Prime Minister of the Federation of Bosnia and Herzegovina, succeeding Nedžad Branković who had resigned earlier in the day. He was replaced by Mustafa Mujezinović on 25 June 2009.

After a one-year governmental formation crisis following the 2010 general election, Bevanda became the Chairman of the Council of Ministers of Bosnia and Herzegovina on 12 January 2012 in the six-party coalition which had included the HDZ BiH as well. He served as Chairman of the Council of Ministers until 31 March 2015.

On 31 March 2015, Bevanda was appointed as the new Minister of Finance and Treasury within the government led by Denis Zvizdić. He stayed as minister in the government of Zoran Tegeltija as well. Bevanda was succeeded as minister by Zoran Tegeltija on 25 January 2023, following the formation of a new government presided over by Borjana Krišto.

== Personal life ==
Vjekoslav is married to Ljiljana Bevanda and together they have two daughters.

Political offices
Preceded by Nedžad Branković	Prime Minister of the Federation of Bosnia and Herzegovina (Acting); 2009	Succeeded by Mustafa Mujezinović
Preceded by Nikola Špirić	Chairman of the Council of Ministers of Bosnia and Herzegovina; 2012–2015	Succeeded by Denis Zvizdić
Preceded by Nikola Špirić	Minister of Finance and Treasury; 2015–2023	Succeeded by Zoran Tegeltija
