= Borjana Krišto =

Chairwoman of the Council of Ministers of Bosnia and Herzegovina since 2023

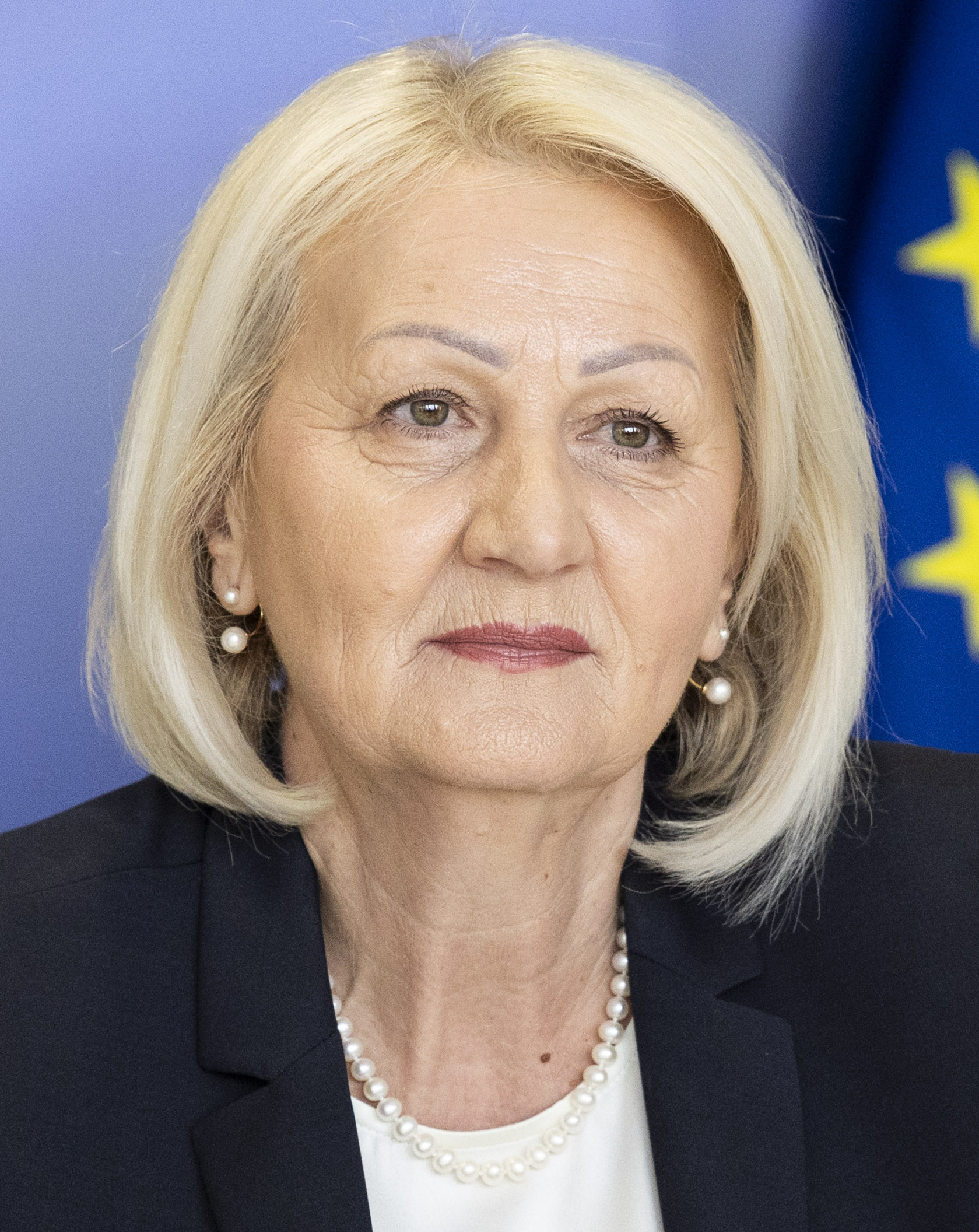
- Krišto in 2025

Chairwoman of the Council of Ministers of Bosnia and Herzegovina
- Incumbent
- Assumed office 25 January 2023
- President: See list: Denis Bećirović Željka Cvijanović Željko Komšić Darijana Filipović
- Deputy: Staša Košarac; Zukan Helez
- Preceded by: Zoran Tegeltija

President of the Federation of Bosnia and Herzegovina
- In office 22 February 2007 – 17 March 2011
- Prime Minister: Ahmet Hadžipašić; Nedžad Branković; Mustafa Mujezinović
- Vice President: Mirsad Kebo; Spomenka Mičić
- Preceded by: Niko Lozančić
- Succeeded by: Živko Budimir
Ministerial offices
Federal Minister of Justice
In office 14 February 2003 – 22 February 2007
Prime Minister	Ahmet Hadžipašić
Preceded by	Zvonko Mijan
Succeeded by	Feliks Vidović
Parliamentary offices
Member of the House of Representatives
In office 9 December 2014 – 1 December 2022
Constituency	1st Electoral Unit
Member of the House of Peoples
In office 9 June 2011 – 9 December 2014

Personal details
- Born: Borjana Krželj; 13 August 1961 (age 65) Livno, PR Bosnia and Herzegovina, FPR Yugoslavia
- Party: Croatian Democratic Union (1995–present)
- Spouse: Branko Krišto
- Education: University of Banja Luka (LLB)

Borjana Krišto (née Krželj; born 13 August 1961) is a Bosnian Croat politician who has served as Chairwoman of the Council of Ministers of Bosnia and Herzegovina since January 2023. She previously served as president of the Federation of Bosnia and Herzegovina from 2007 to 2011. She is the first woman to hold both positions.

Krišto holds a degree in law from the Faculty of Law at the University of Banja Luka. From 2003 to 2007, she served as Federal Minister of Justice. Following the 2006 general election, she became president of the Federation of Bosnia and Herzegovina in February 2007, serving until March 2011. In June 2011, Krišto was one of the candidates for nomination to the office of Chairwoman of the Council of Ministers. Ultimately, she was not nominated.

A member of the Croatian Democratic Union since 1995, Krišto was the party's candidate for a seat in the Bosnian Presidency as a Croat member in the 2010 and 2022 general elections. However, she failed to get elected in both elections. She was a member of both the national House of Peoples and the House of Representatives as well.

In January 2023, Krišto was appointed Chairwoman of the Council of Ministers, following the 2022 general election.

== Early life and education ==
The daughter of Josip ("Jože") and Janja Krželj, Borjana Krišto grew up in Livno, where she graduated from the high school of economics in 1980. She then obtained a law degree from the University of Banja Luka in 1984, and passed the bar exam in Sarajevo. She worked in the legal departments of several companies, including "Agro Livno" (1987–1988), "Guber Livno" (1990–1991), "Likom Livno" (1991–1992), and "Livno bus" (1995–1999).

== Political career ==
Krišto entered politics in 1995, joining the Croatian Democratic Union of Bosnia and Herzegovina. She has been a member of the party's presidency since 2001, and the deputy president since 2007. Krišto served as Minister of Justice in the Government of Canton 10 from 1999 to 2000, and later as Secretary of the Cantonal government from 2000 until 2002. In the 2002 general election, she was elected to the Federal House of Representatives. However, she did not become a member, as she was appointed Minister of Justice in the Federal Government.

In the 2006 general election, Krišto was elected to the national House of Representatives. She was also appointed as a member of the delegation of Bosnia and Herzegovina to the Parliamentary Assembly of the Council of Europe. She resigned from both legislative posts upon her election as president of the Federation of Bosnia and Herzegovina, one of the two autonomous entities that compose Bosnia and Herzegovina, on 22 February 2007. Krišto was the first woman to serve as Federal president. She served as president until 17 March 2011, when she was succeeded by Živko Budimir.

In the 2010 general election, Krišto ran for a seat in the Presidency of Bosnia and Herzegovina as a Croat member, but was not elected, obtaining only 19.74% of the vote, with Željko Komšić of the Social Democratic Party getting elected with 60.61% of the vote. Following the election, she was appointed member of the national House of Peoples. In June 2011, Krišto was one of the candidates for nomination to the office of Chairwoman of the Council of Ministers. Out of three candidates, she came in third place when ranked by the Bosnian Presidency.

In the 2014 general election, Krišto was once again elected to the national House of Representatives. She was re-elected to office in the 2018 general election. The Croatian Democratic Union announced Krišto's candidacy in the Bosnian general election in June 2022, running once again for Presidency member and representing the Croats. In the general election, held on 2 October 2022, she failed to get elected, having obtained 44.20% of the vote. The incumbent Bosnian Croat presidency member Željko Komšić got re-elected, obtaining 55.80% of the vote.

== Chairwoman of the Council of Ministers (2023–present) ==
=== Appointment ===
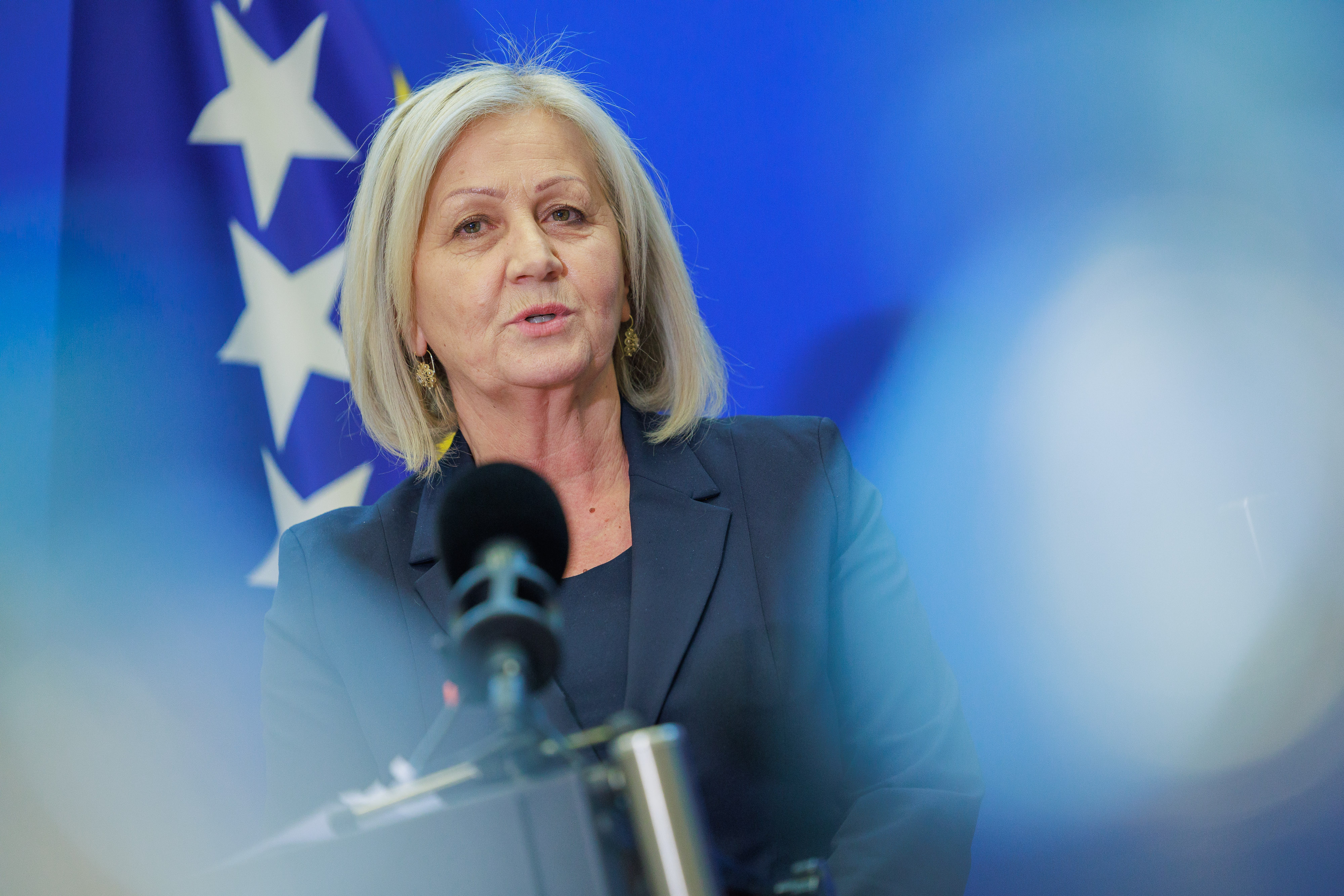
Krišto during a press conference, 5 December 2023

Following the 2022 general election, a coalition led by the Alliance of Independent Social Democrats (SNSD), the Croatian Democratic Union (BiH) and the liberal alliance Troika reached an agreement on the formation of a new government, designating Krišto as the new Chairwoman of the Council of Ministers. The Presidency officially nominated her as chairwoman-designate on 22 December.

The national House of Representatives confirmed Krišto's appointment on 28 December, making her the first female Chairwoman of the Council of Ministers. On 25 January 2023, the House of Representatives confirmed the appointment of Krišto's cabinet. Krišto pledged she would lead a national government that will work hard to restart delayed integration of Bosnia and Herzegovina into the European Union.

=== Domestic policy ===
In January 2025, the alliance Troika announced that it was rescinding its support for the coalition with the SNSD, following the latter failing to vote for two laws concentrated on European Union accession. The legislation was ultimately passed with votes from the SNSD's opposition in Republika Srpska. Since then, Krišto has been accused of intentionally ignoring the appointment of Troika-backed Republika Srpska opposition politician Nebojša Vukanović as the new Minister of Security following the office's vacancy in January 2025. Krišto's actions sparked up renewed stories of the SNSD's and HDZ BiH's long-standing relations. Some opposition parties have called for Krišto's resignation and for a vote of no confidence.

==== Cabinet reshuffle ====
In May 2023, Zoran Tegeltija, the Minister of Finance and Treasury and the Vice Chairman of the Council of Ministers, was appointed director of the Indirect Taxation Authority. On 15 June 2023, he was officially confirmed as the new director, therefore resigning from Krišto's Cabinet. Srđan Amidžić was appointed as the new Minister of Finance and Treasury in August 2023, following Krišto's nomination. In December 2024, Nenad Nešić, the Minister of Security, was arrested, and later indicted on charges of political corruption. Following the indictment, Nešić announced he was to resign as minister on 23 January 2025, marking another cabinet reshuffle.

Since Nešić's resignation, opposition parties in the national House of Peoples have signed various requests for the dismissal of the remaining SNSD ministers in Krišto's cabinet.

=== Foreign policy ===
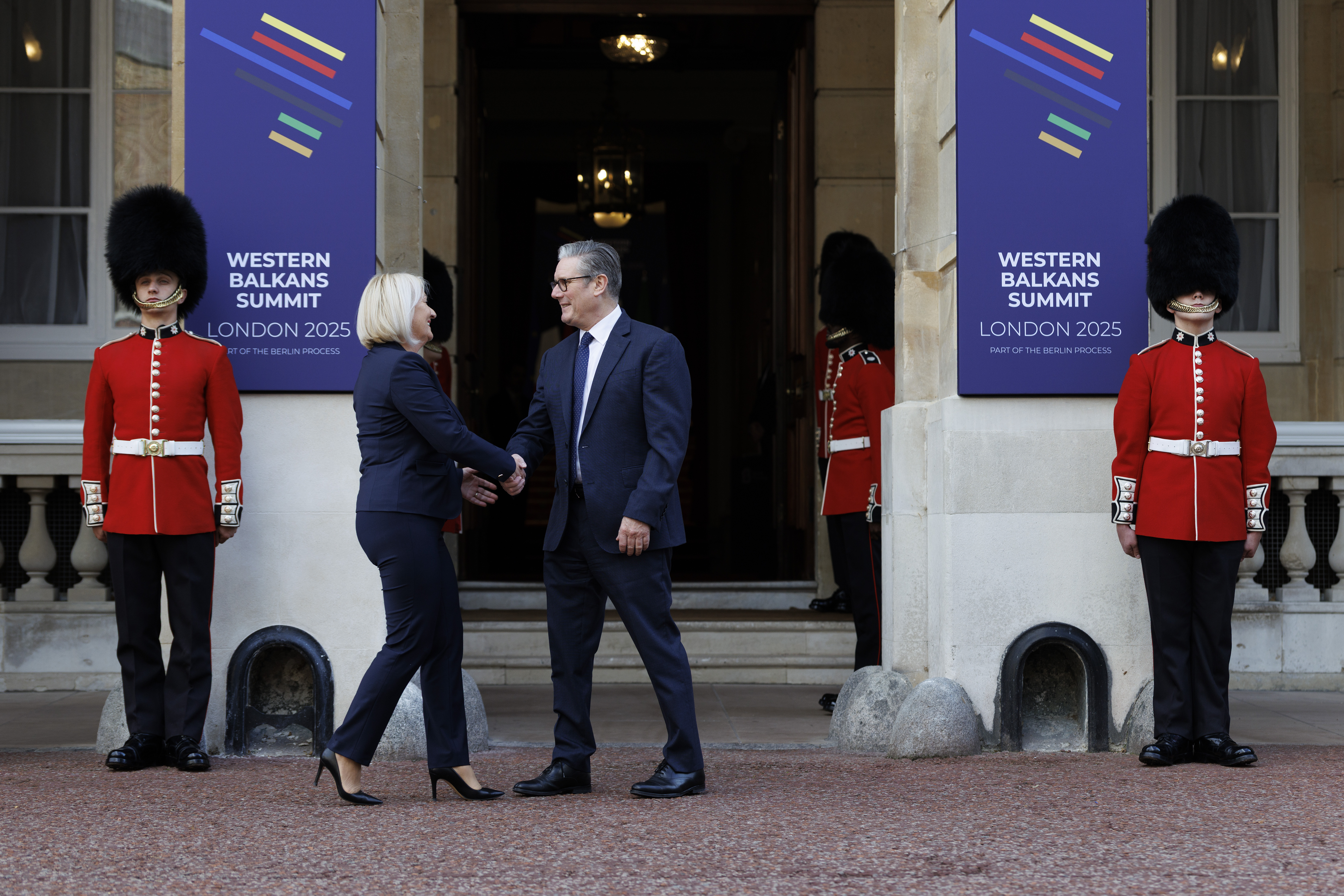
Krišto greeting British Prime Minister Keir Starmer, 22 October 2025

On 16 February 2023, Krišto made her first official visit to neighbouring Croatia and met with Prime Minister Andrej Plenković, where they discussed bilateral relations and economic cooperation between the two countries. In April 2023, she met with Pope Francis in Vatican City.

In an interview to Israel Hayom, Krišto supported moving Bosnia and Herzegovina's embassy in Israel to Jerusalem, but said that this move depended on the Bosnian Presidency. With the outbreak of the Gaza war in October 2023, Krišto condemned Hamas' attacks as "unjust and brutal" and expressed support for Israel. She was accused by Presidency member Željko Komšić for expressing her support for Israel, calling Krišto's statement "hasty and selfish". Israeli ambassador to Bosnia and Herzegovina Galit Peleg criticised Komšić's statement and defended Krišto.

==== European Union ====
On 20 March 2023, Krišto went to Brussels, meeting with European Council president Charles Michel, who she thanked for the EU's continuous support to Bosnia and Herzegovina, while Michel congratulated Krišto and her cabinet on the adoption of the Program of Economic Reforms of Bosnia and Herzegovina for the period 2023–2025, which represents a strong step forward on the country's European path.

In August 2023, Krišto attended the Bled Strategic Forum, where she talked about Bosnia and Herzegovina's progress on its future EU accession, saying that the country "made a huge step forward in terms of harmonizing our legislation with the European Union and of course in terms of meeting the requirements of the opinion of the European Commission", as well as adding that she held a series of bilateral meetings with other officials as part of the Forum.

On 21 March 2024, at a summit in Brussels, all 27 EU leaders, representing the European Council, unanimously agreed to open EU accession talks with Bosnia and Herzegovina after the Council of Ministers adopted the law on the prevention of conflict of interests and the law on anti-money laundering and countering terrorist financing among other things. Talks are set to begin following the impeding of more reforms.

== Personal life ==
Krišto is married to Branko Krišto, a specialist in otorhinolaryngology. In March 2017, she was targeted in an incident involving verbal abuse and stone throwing outside her home in Livno.

Political offices
Preceded by Zoran Tegeltija	Chairwoman of the Council of Ministers of Bosnia and Herzegovina; 2023–present	Incumbent
