= Srđan Amidžić =

Bosnian Serb politician (born 1980)

- Срђан Амиџић

Minister of Finance and Treasury
- Incumbent
- Assumed office 22 August 2023
- Prime Minister: Borjana Krišto
- Preceded by: Zoran Tegeltija
Parliamentary offices
Member of the National Assembly of Republika Srpska
In office
24 November 2014 – 19 November 2018

Personal details
- Born: 26 December 1980 (age 45) Banja Luka, SR Bosnia and Herzegovina, SFR Yugoslavia
- Party: Alliance of Independent Social Democrats (since 2007)
- Spouse: Vanja Amidžić
- Children: 2
- Education: University of Banja Luka (BEc, PhD); University of Belgrade (MEc)

Srđan Amidžić (born 26 December 1980) is a Bosnian Serb politician serving as Minister of Finance and Treasury since August 2023. He also served as member of the National Assembly of Republika Srpska from 2014 to 2018, as well as deputy mayor of Banja Luka from 206 to 2021.

Born in Banja Luka, Amidžić earned a degree in economics from the University of Banja Luka. He is a member of the Alliance of Independent Social Democrats.

== Early life and education ==
Amidžić was born in Banja Luka on 26 December 1980. He earned a BEc from the University of Banja Luka in 2004, and a MEc from the University of Belgrade's Faculty of Economics in 2008. He obtained a PhD from the University of Banja Luka in 2011.

Amidžić later worked as a professor at the University of Banja Luka's Faculty of Economics. Before assuming office as the Minister of Finance and Treasury, he and his wife, Vanja, divested all their shares in six co-owned companies, which primarily specialized in financial consulting, credit advisory, and insurance brokerage. In some of the companies, he partnered with former Chairman of the Council of Ministers, Dragan Mikerević.

== Political career ==
A member of the Alliance of Independent Social Democrats since 2007, Amidžić served as deputy mayor of Banja Luka from 2016 to 2021. In the 2014 general election, he was elected to the National Assembly of Republika Srpska, obtaining over 7,000 votes.

In May 2023, Zoran Tegeltija, the Minister of Finance and Treasury within the Council of Ministers of Bosnia and Herzegovina, was appointed director of the Indirect Taxation Authority. On 15 June 2023, he was officially confirmed as the new director, therefore resigning from the Krišto cabinet. Amidžić was later nominated for the ministerial office by Borjana Krišto, and was ultimately appointed as minister on 22 August 2023.

== Personal life ==
Srđan is married to Vanja Amidžić and together they have two children. They live in Banja Luka.

Political offices
Preceded by Zoran Tegeltija	Minister of Finance and Treasury; 2023–present	Incumbent
