= 2021 Balkan non-papers =

Two documents proposing redrawn borders of Southeast Europe

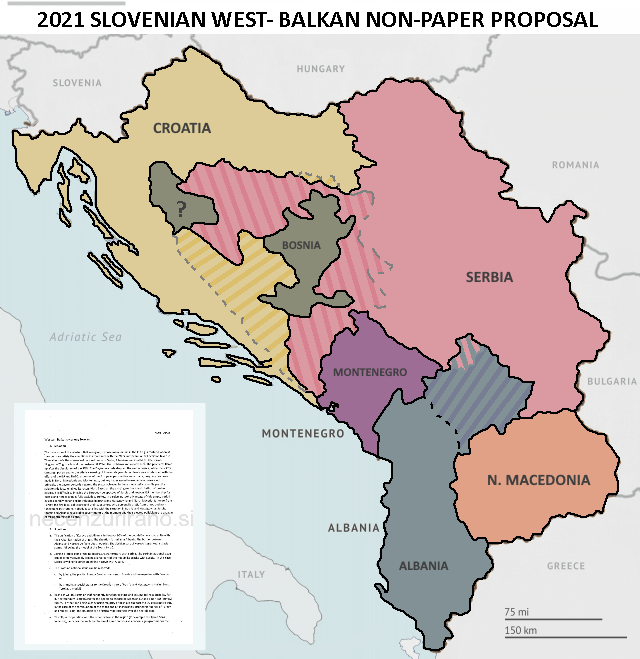
Map of the Western Balkans according to the first non-paper

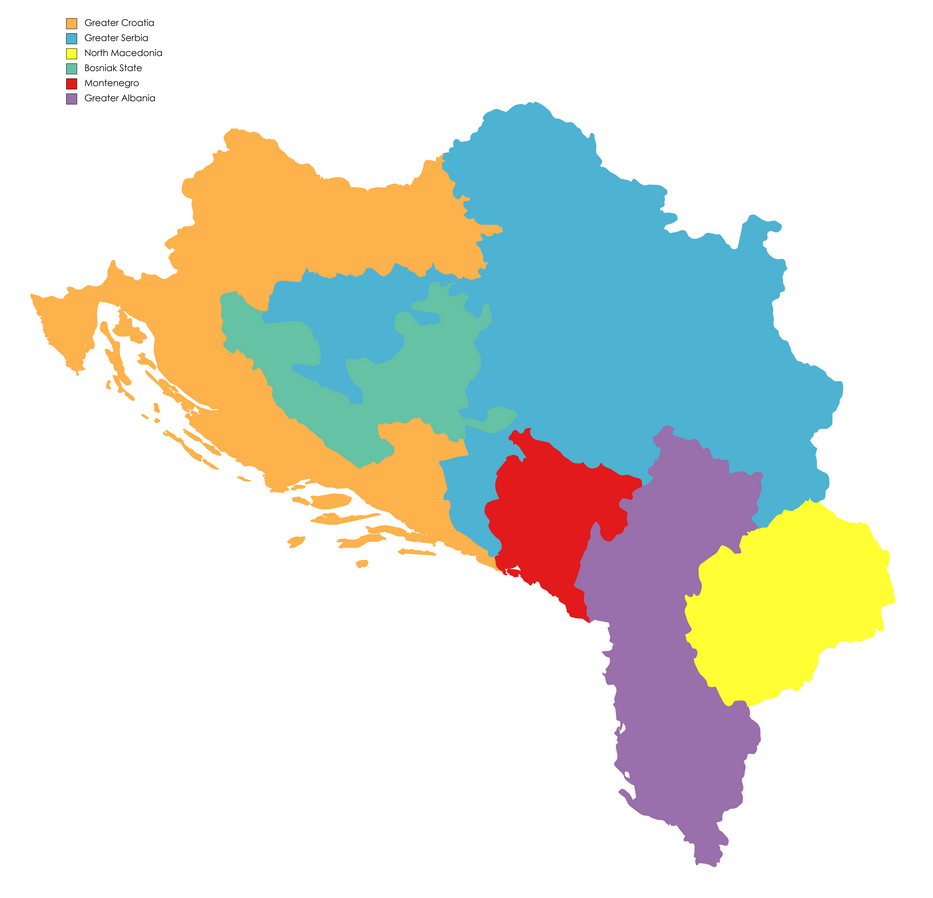
Other proposed redrawn borders map of the Western Balkans: Greater Croatia; Greater Serbia; Bosniak state; Montenegro; North Macedonia; Greater Albania

The 2021 Balkan non-papers were two documents of unknown origin, claimed to have been drafted by the government of Slovenia by several sources, which carried proposals for the redrawing of borders in Southeastern Europe. The first non-paper called for the "peaceful dissolution" of Bosnia and Herzegovina with the annexation of Republika Srpska and great parts of Herzegovina and Central Bosnia into a Greater Serbia and Greater Croatia, leaving a small Bosniak state in what is central and western Bosnia, as well as the unification of Albania and Kosovo. The story about the first non-paper was first published by Bosnian web portal politicki.ba on 12 April 2021. The existence of the first non-paper was initially disputed, with Albanian prime minister Edi Rama being one of the few to claim to have been shown it. The Slovenian website Necenzurirano published the alleged non-paper on 15 April 2021.

The first non-paper's plans and ideas were heavily criticized and reacted to by many political leaders from Bosnia and Herzegovina, Serbia, Croatia, Montenegro, Slovenia, North Macedonia, as well as by politicians from the European Union and Russia. A second non-paper, which first appeared in Kosovo's Albanian-language media in April 2021, proposed that Serbia recognize Kosovo's independence by February 2022 and that Serb-majority North Kosovo be granted autonomy in return for Serbia's recognition.

== Reactions ==
Regarding the non-paper, Bosnian Presidency Bosnian-Croat member Željko Komšić said that it was "all already orchestrated and only God knows what the outcome will be." The other Bosnian Presidency member, Šefik Džaferović (who is Bosnian Muslim), sent a letter of concern to European Council President Charles Michel. After hearing news about the document, Slovenian prime minister Janez Janša spoke in a telephone call with Džaferović, stating that "there is no non-paper regarding border changes in the Western Balkans" and adding that he supports "the territorial integrity of Bosnia and Herzegovina." The Chairman of the Council of Ministers of Bosnia and Herzegovina, Zoran Tegeltija, said that he isn't "a man of inflammatory rhetoric" and that he "will not deal with fictional papers".

A member of the European Parliament from Slovenia, Tanja Fajon, stated that the "ideas on the non-paper are dangerous, problems have to be solved through dialogue." Slovenian president Borut Pahor said that he rejects "dangerous ideas about border changes in the Balkans" and that he knew "nothing about the non-paper."

Croatian prime minister Andrej Plenković said that he "read the non-paper on a web portal, but Croatia didn't receive it." Russian Minister of Foreign Affairs Sergey Lavrov stated that the document "is a dangerous game, Brussels reacts differently when Russia is involved." Serbian president Aleksandar Vučić only said that "Serbia can only help Bosnia and Herzegovina" and that "it does not interfere in the country's internal affairs." Montenegrin president Milo Đukanović gave his view on the non-paper, stating that "it is a dangerous thing, it has been offered by someone who wants war to happen as soon as possible."

Euractiv reacted to the non-paper, saying that "it's like the Rorschach test, everyone sees in it what they want." The European Commission's vice-president and EU's High Representative for Foreign Affairs and Security Policy, Josep Borrell, said that he "never received the non-paper", but that he did "hear about it." Macedonian president Stevo Pendarovski said that "every change of borders in the Balkans leads to a bloodshed."

Steffen Seibert, spokesperson of German chancellor Angela Merkel, simply stated that the "stories of border changes in the Western Balkans are very dangerous."

On 11 June 2021, the Slovenian government declassified a previous non-paper on the topic of Bosnia and Herzegovina, which former Slovenian president Milan Kučan had prepared confidentially in 2011.

== See also ==
- Partition of Bosnia and Herzegovina
- Proposed secession of Republika Srpska
