= Denis Zvizdić =

Chairman of the Council of Ministers of Bosnia and Herzegovina from 2015 to 2019

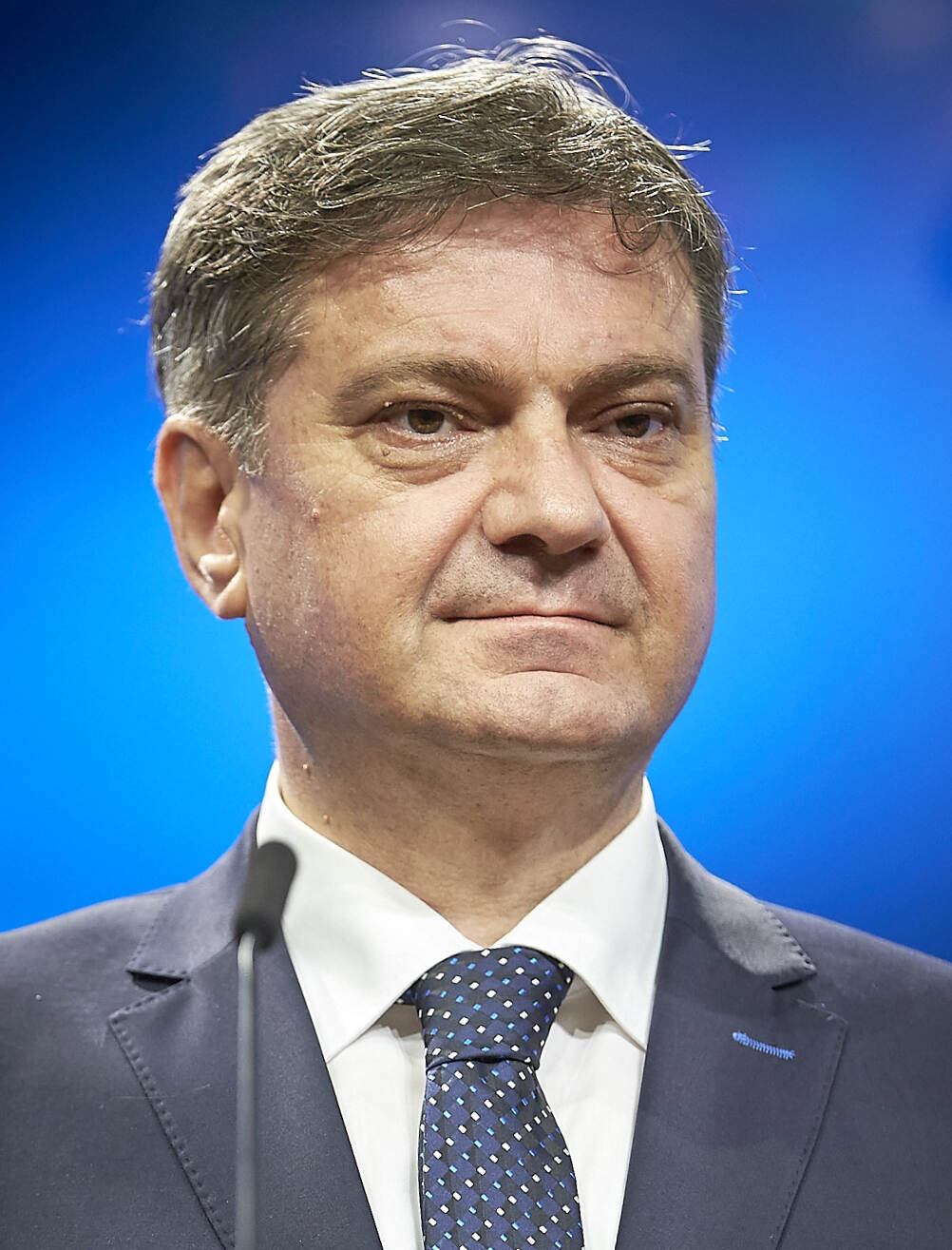
- Zvizdić in 2017

Chairman of the Council of Ministers of Bosnia and Herzegovina
- In office 31 March 2015 – 23 December 2019
- President: See list: Bakir Izetbegović Šefik Džaferović Mladen Ivanić Milorad Dodik Dragan Čović Željko Komšić
- Preceded by: Vjekoslav Bevanda
- Succeeded by: Zoran Tegeltija

Member of the House of Representatives
- Incumbent
- Assumed office 6 December 2018
- Constituency: 3rd Electoral Unit of the FBiH

Prime Minister of Sarajevo Canton
- In office 6 February 2003 – 16 November 2006
- Preceded by: Nermin Pećanac
- Succeeded by: Samir Silajdžić
Parliamentary offices
Member of the Federal House of Representatives
In office 9 March 2011 – 2 December 2014
| Constituency | 11th Electoral Unit of the FBiH |
Member of the Federal House of Peoples
In office 25 January 2007 – 17 March 2011

Personal details
- Born: 9 June 1964 (age 62) Sarajevo, SR Bosnia and Herzegovina, SFR Yugoslavia
- Party: People and Justice (2021–present)
- Other political affiliations: Party of Democratic Action (1991–2021)
- Spouse: Samira Zvizdić
- Relations: Aljoša Čampara (cousin)
- Children: 1
- Education: University of Sarajevo (BArch, MArch, PhD)

Denis Zvizdić (born 9 June 1964) is a Bosnian politician who served as Chairman of the Council of Ministers of Bosnia and Herzegovina from 2015 to 2019. He has been serving as member of the national House of Representatives since 2018. He also served as Prime Minister of Sarajevo Canton from 2003 to 2006.

Zvidzić was a prominent figure of the Party of Democratic Action, until he left it in 2021 to join the People and Justice party.

== Early life and education ==
Zvizdić was born on 9 June 1964 in Sarajevo. He studied at the Faculty of Architecture of the University of Sarajevo, where he earned a PhD and in 2007 became a professor of architecture.

== Early career ==
Zvizdić had worked at the Ministry for Environment and Construction of the Republic of Bosnia and Herzegovina and of the Federation of Bosnia and Herzegovina (FBiH), as well as for the Unioninvest Sarajevo Company prior to his political career. He was also co-director of the National Action Plan for Protection of Environment.

== Political career ==
In 2003, Zvizdić became Prime Minister of the Sarajevo Canton, his first major political appointment, and in 2006 speaker of the Sarajevo Canton Assembly.

He was then a member of the Federal Parliament, having served in the House of Peoples from 2007 to 2011, and then in the House of Representatives from 2011 until 2014.

Zvizdić joined the Party of Democratic Action (SDA) in 1991. He was a member of its presidency from 2005. In 2009, Zvizdić was appointed Chair of the SDA Council and joined the party's Main Board in 2013. He was a member of the party Cantonal Board in Sarajevo (2004–05), and prior to that member of the Sarajevo Centar Municipal Board (2000–03).

=== Chairman of the Council of Ministers (2015–2019) ===
On 31 March 2015, in a vote in the national House of Representatives determining the new Chairman of the Council of Ministers of Bosnia and Herzegovina, 28 out of the 42 Parliament members voted for Zvizdić, 5 voted against and 2 abstained. Zvizdić promised that his government would improve action on the accession of Bosnia and Herzegovina to the European Union.

During his chairmanship, the SAA agreement with the EU entered into force on 15 July 2015, and on 15 February 2016, Bosnia and Herzegovina submitted its EU membership application.

In July 2016, Zvizdić's government approved a comprehensive anti-discrimination law which has to do with LGBT rights in Bosnia and Herzegovina, banning discrimination on account of one's sexual orientation, gender identity and sex characteristics. Later on, the Parliament adopted the law. This came after the Law Against Discrimination was adopted in 2009, prohibiting discrimination based on sex, gender expression and sexual orientation. Furthermore, the law forbids harassment and segregation on the basis of sexual orientation. The country's desire to join the EU also played an important role in the government's approach to LGBT rights.

After the 2018 general election and with a newly established Council of Ministers, Zvizdić was succeeded as chairman by Zoran Tegeltija of the Alliance of Independent Social Democrats (SNSD) on 23 December 2019.

=== Later career ===
Following months of bickering with the party's leadership, Zvizdić opted to leave the SDA in July 2021, after which he joined the People and Justice party in November. He was re-elected to the national House of Representatives in the 2022 general election, obtaining nearly 27,000 votes.

== Personal life ==
Denis is married to Samira Zvizdić, and together they have a son named Kenan.

Political offices
| Preceded by Vjekoslav Bevanda | Chairman of the Council of Ministers of Bosnia and Herzegovina; 2015–2019 | Succeeded by Zoran Tegeltija |
