= Zoran Tegeltija =

Chairman of the Council of Ministers of Bosnia and Herzegovina from 2019 to 2023

- Зоран Тегелтија
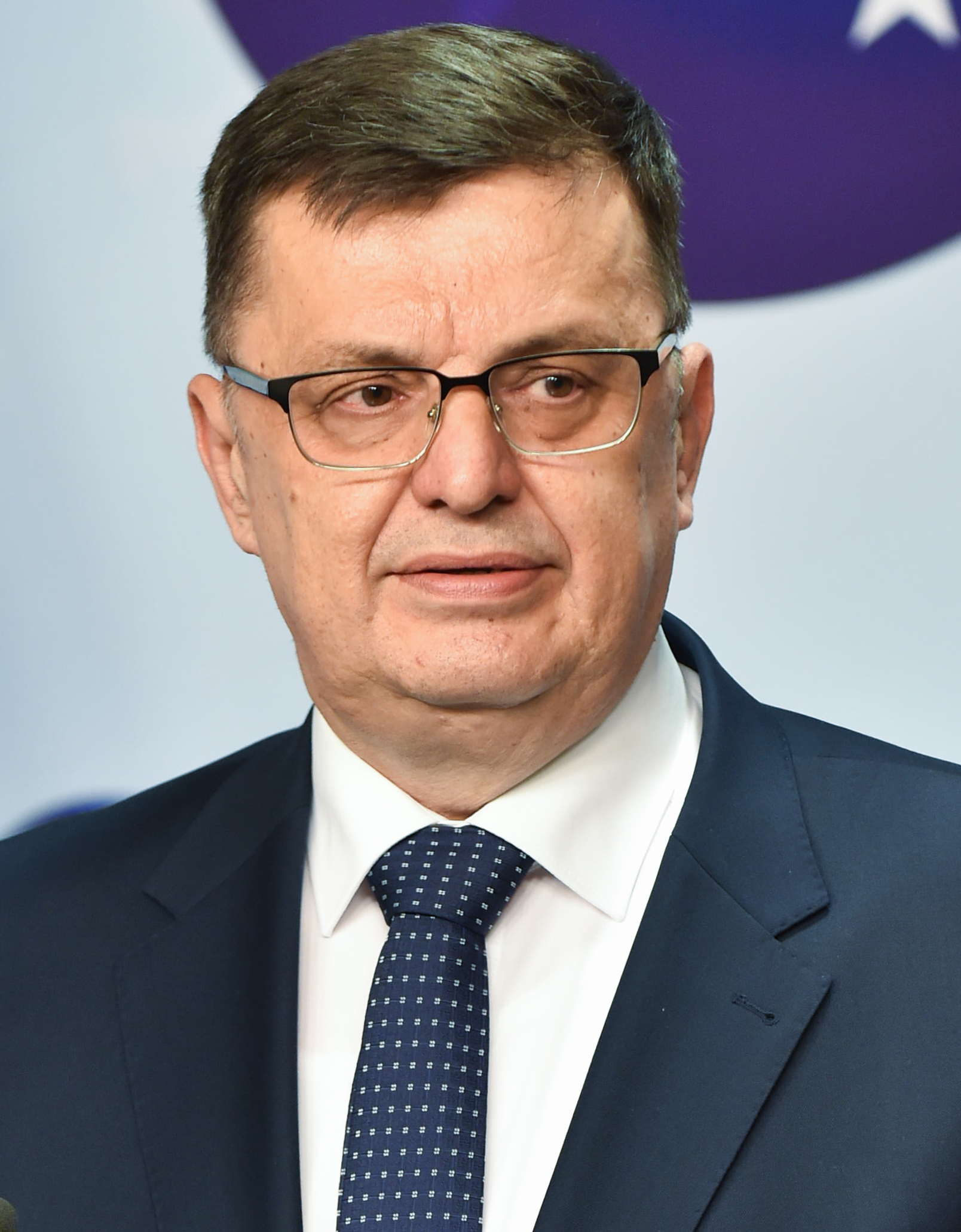
- Tegeltija in 2021

Chairman of the Council of Ministers of Bosnia and Herzegovina
- In office 23 December 2019 – 25 January 2023
- President: See list: Šefik Džaferović Denis Bećirović Milorad Dodik Željka Cvijanović Željko Komšić
- Preceded by: Denis Zvizdić
- Succeeded by: Borjana Krišto

Mayor of Mrkonjić Grad
- In office 2 October 2004 – 29 December 2010
- Succeeded by: Divna Aničić
Ministerial offices
Minister of Finance and Treasury
In office 25 January 2023 – 15 June 2023
| Prime Minister | Borjana Krišto |
| Preceded by | Vjekoslav Bevanda |
| Succeeded by | Srđan Amidžić |
Minister of Finance of Republika Srpska
In office 29 December 2010 – 18 December 2018
| Prime Minister | Aleksandar Džombić; Željka Cvijanović |
| Preceded by | Aleksandar Džombić |
| Succeeded by | Zora Vidović |

Personal details
- Born: 29 September 1961 (age 65) Mrkonjić Grad, PR Bosnia and Herzegovina, FPR Yugoslavia
- Party: Alliance of Independent Social Democrats (1998–present)
- Spouse: Dušanka Tegeltija
- Children: 2
- Education: University of Sarajevo (BEc); Alfa BK University (MEc, PhD)

Zoran Tegeltija (Serbian Cyrillic: Зоран Тегелтија; born 29 September 1961) is a Bosnian Serb politician serving as director of the Indirect Taxation Authority of Bosnia and Herzegovina (ITA) since June 2023. He previously served as Minister of Finance and Treasury from January to June 2023. He also served as Chairman of the Council of Ministers of Bosnia and Herzegovina from 2019 to 2023.

Tegeltija graduated from the School of Economics and Business at the University of Sarajevo in 1986, and later worked in customs services. A member of the Alliance of Independent Social Democrats, he was elected to the National Assembly of Republika Srpska in 2000. In 2004, Tegeltija was elected mayor of Mrkonjić Grad and re-elected in 2008. In 2010, Aleksandar Džombić appointed him Minister of Finance of Republika Srpska. He served as Minister of Finance until the entity government of Radovan Višković was formed in 2018.

In 2019, Tegeltija was appointed Chairman of the Council of Ministers, following the 2018 general election. Following the 2022 general election, he was succeeded as Chairman of the Council of Ministers by Borjana Krišto, but stayed in the cabinet as Minister of Finance and Treasury. Tegeltija resigned as minister in June 2023, following his appointment as director of the ITA.

== Early life and education ==
Tegeltija is a Serb and has attended schools in his native Mrkonjić Grad and then moved to Sarajevo, where in 1986, he graduated from the School of Economics and Business at the University of Sarajevo.

He worked at the Bosanski Brod oil refinery, the Tax Administration and the Customs Administration of Republika Srpska as an adviser to the director. In addition, he was a lecturer at the RS Customs Administration training centre, and member of the commission for the implementation of the Bosnian customs policy.

== Early political career ==
Tegeltija has been a member of the Alliance of Independent Social Democrats (SNSD) since 1998. He was first elected in 2000 in the town council of Mrkonjić Grad as well as a member of the National Assembly of Republika Srpska and later served as chairman of the State Commission for the Bosnia and Herzegovina borders.

Tegeltija was elected mayor of Mrkonjić Grad in 2004 and re-elected as mayor in 2008, serving until 29 December 2010. In the 2006 Bosnian general election, he was the head of the party's election headquarters. Albeit a close ally of Milorad Dodik, Tegeltija has never engaged in nationalistic rhetoric, nor been embroiled in major scandals.

In 2006, he completed his postgraduate studies and in 2008 gained the title of Doctor of Economic Sciences from Alpha BK University in Belgrade. Since 2009, he worked as a senior assistant and then assistant professor at the Faculty of Engineering and Business Management, University of Banja Luka, teaching public finance and monetary economics.

== Minister of Finance of Republika Srpska (2010–2018) ==
Tegeltija was appointed Minister of Finance of the Republika Srpska entity on 29 December 2010 in the government of Aleksandar Džombić, and was later confirmed in the post in the first and second cabinet of Željka Cvijanović in 2013 and 2014. He was re-elected to the National Assembly in the 2018 general election.

During his ministerial tenure, three banks failed in Republika Srpska, including Bobar Banka and Balkan Investment Bank. Tegeltija's government increased its capital in the latter by €15,000,000 in 2013, becoming majority owner of it. The bank changed its name in Bank of Srpska, but was liquidated in 2016, with a loss estimated at €60,000,000 in public and private deposits. The RS Banking Agency, under the jurisdiction of Tegeltija's entity ministry of Finance, was blamed for lack of supervision on the banking sector. The RS entity Supreme Court ruled in July 2019 that the Agency had illegally hid data on banking operation and that the bankruptcies could have been prevented.

In 2017, the RS entity Public Sector Audit Office contested the official estimates of public deficit, claiming it was up to €87,500,000, and not €22,500,000 as reported by Tegeltija's ministry. The audit office also found that the government had taken loans on behalf of funds and public institutions without their knowledge. The Auditor-General Duško Šnjegota resigned soon after, and Jovo Radukić, a former assistant to Tegeltija was appointed in his stead. The move was widely denounced as a clear case of political pressure on independent institutions.

== Chairman of the Council of Ministers (2019–2023) ==
=== Appointment ===
After a one-year governmental formation crisis following the 2018 general election, on 5 December 2019, the national House of Representatives confirmed the appointment of Tegeltija as the new Chairman of the Council of Ministers of Bosnia and Herzegovina. The whole government was confirmed by Parliament on 23 December.

=== Domestic policy ===
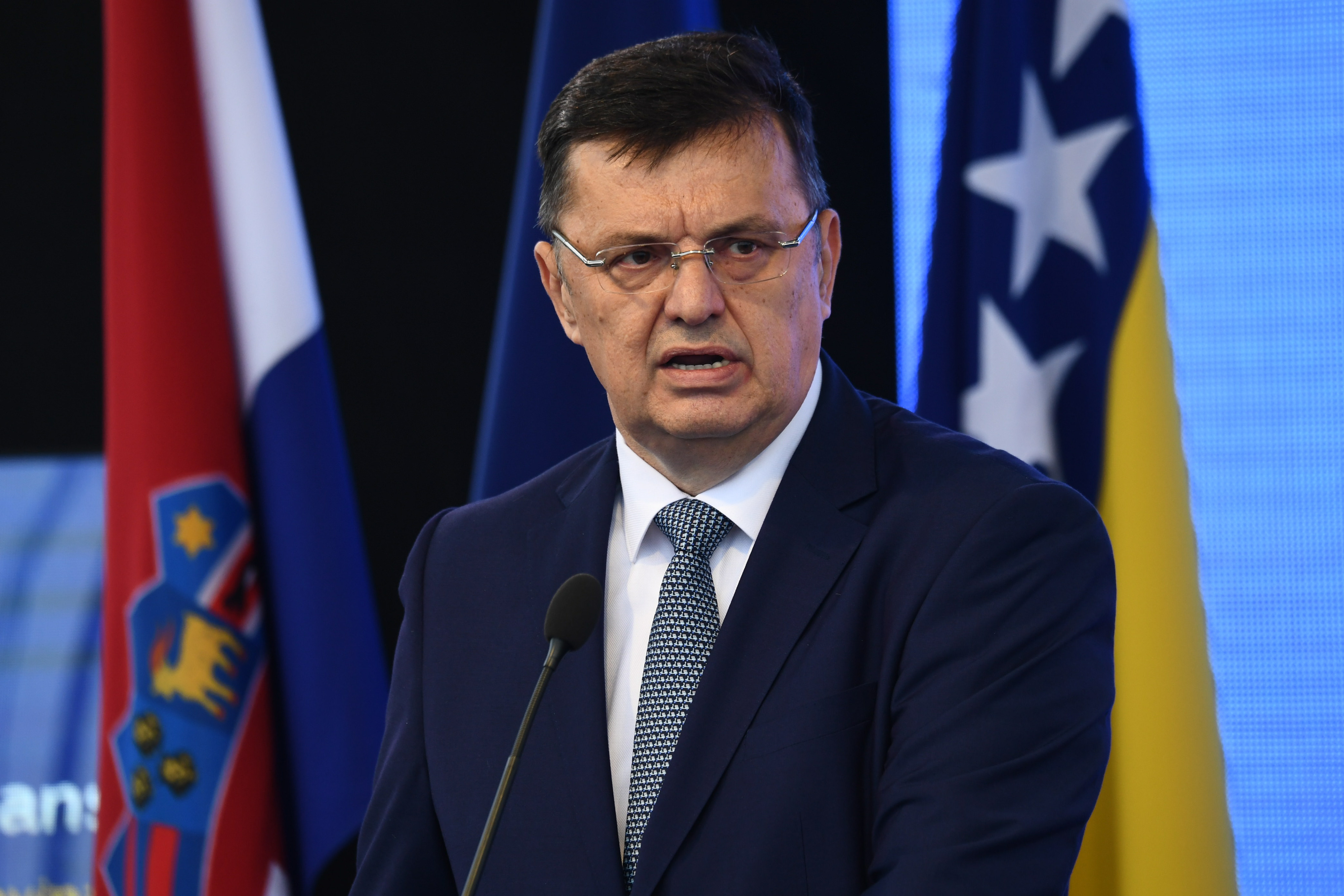
Tegeltija giving a speech, September 2021

At a national House of Representatives session held on 11 January 2021, a vote of no confidence in Tegeltija took place, due to "poor results during his term as chairman", but was ultimately unsuccessful. Three months later, on 28 April, another unsuccessful vote of no confidence in Tegeltija took place.

On 28 September 2021, Tegeltija's government unanimously adopted the decision on temporary financing, which ensures safe functioning of state institutions. In October 2021, the cabinet, at the proposal of the Ministry of Foreign Trade and Economic Relations, drafted a decision on temporary suspension and reduction of customs rates on imports of new electric and hybrid cars until 31 December 2022.

In February 2022, it was decided that the Ministry of Foreign Affairs would inform neighbouring Croatian officials in diplomatic notes that it wants experts from Bosnia and Herzegovina to work together with Croatian experts on testing the soil of Trgovska gora, where a nuclear waste dump is planned to be built. Tegeltija said that the "health of the citizens in that area and environmental protection are a priority" and also pointed out his interest in the "provision of funds for soil testing."

Tegeltija served as chairman of the Council of Ministers until 25 January 2023, when a new cabinet headed by Borjana Krišto was formed.

==== Cabinet reshuffle ====
During the period from December 2019 until May 2020, the office of Minister of Human Rights and Refugees was vacant, with the leading parties in government not finding common ground on naming a new minister; eventually, DNS's Miloš Lučić was decided to take on the role of minister, getting confirmed by Parliament on 15 May 2020. Less than a month after Lučić's appointment, Fahrudin Radončić resigned as Minister of Security over a migration dispute with other members of Tegeltija's government; Radončić proposed the deportation of 9,000 migrants which Tegeltija was against. On 23 July 2020, Selmo Cikotić became the new Minister of Security in Tegeltija's cabinet, succeeding Radončić.

On 12 March 2021, Tegeltija dismissed Miloš Lučić from his duties as Minister of Human Rights and Refugees, following the abolishment of the coalition between Tegeltija's SNSD party and Lučić's DNS. Eighteen days later, on 30 March, the national House of Representatives confirmed Lučić's dismissal, but the decision officially never took effect because the national House of Peoples, the upper house of the bicameral Parliamentary Assembly of Bosnia and Herzegovina, didn't confirm the dismissal.

In October 2021, the Minister of Defence in Tegeltija's cabinet, Sifet Podžić, canceled a military exercise between the Serbian Army and the Armed Forces of Bosnia and Herzegovina due to the "bad epidemiological situation in the country and because of the small number of vaccinated members of the Armed Forces." This was met with outrage by Tegeltija, who sent a request for the removal of Podžić as minister to the national Parliament. Some days later, he submitted the decision on the dismissal of Podžić to the House of Representatives. On 26 October, the majority of the House of Representatives members voted against Tegeltija's decision and did not support Podžić's dismissal.

==== COVID-19 pandemic ====
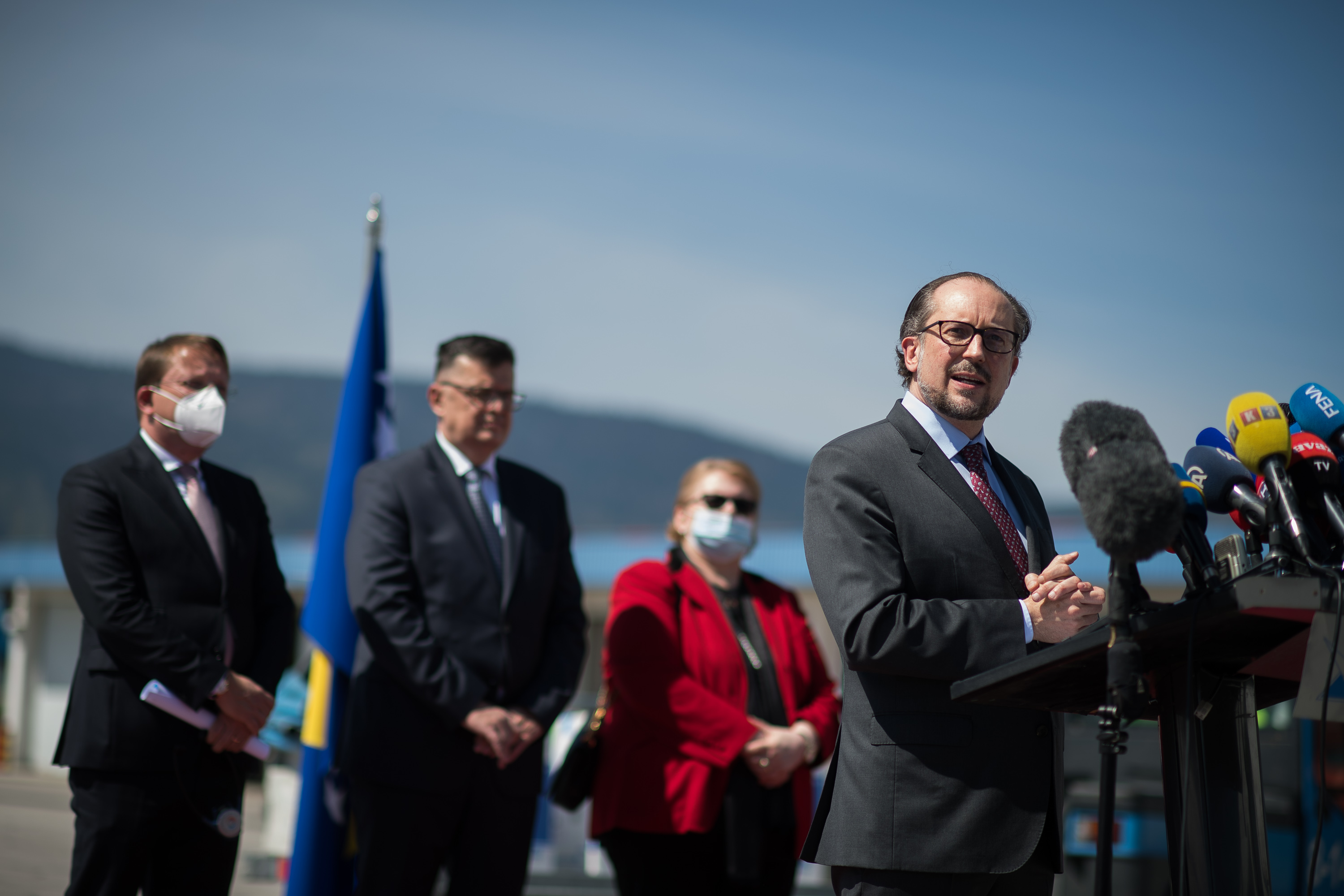
From left to right: European Commissioner Olivér Várhelyi, Tegeltija, Bosnian Foreign Minister Bisera Turković and Austrian Foreign Minister Alexander Schallenberg during a COVID-19 vaccine donation acceptance from the EU, 4 May 2021

Since March 2020, as head of government, Tegeltija has been one of the high-ranking officials that has led Bosnia and Herzegovina's ongoing response to the COVID-19 pandemic.

On 15 March 2020, the Council of Ministers issued a decision which forbid for foreign nationals entering Bosnia and Herzegovina to enter from areas with intensive transmission of COVID-19, and especially from: Provinces of the PRC (Wuhan), South Korea, Japan, Italy, Iran, France, Romania, Germany, Austria, Spain, Switzerland and Belgium. On 17 March, Tegeltija's government declared a state of emergency in the entire country.

On 24 March 2020, the Council of Ministers issued a decision which banned entrance for all foreigners, and also from 30 March, all borders at airports in Bosnia and Herzegovina were closed for passengers, and airplanes could land only to deliver cargo. On 21 May 2020, the government headed by Tegeltija adopted a decision which allowed entry and stay of a foreigner who entered Bosnia and Herzegovina due to business obligations, provided that they have an invitational letter from a legal entity from Bosnia and Herzegovina that hired them in the country and a certificate of a negative test for SARS-CoV-2 virus from an authorized laboratory, not older than 48 hours from the time of entry. Citizens of Croatia, Montenegro and Serbia could enter Bosnia and Herzegovina without any additional condition from 1 June 2020.

The effects of restrictive measures and their relaxation were scientifically analyzed. After the authorities lifted mandatory quarantine restrictions, the instantaneous reproduction number increased from 1.13 on 20 May to 1.72 on 31 May. On 7 November 2020, it was confirmed that Tegeltija tested positive for COVID-19; by 21 November, he recovered.

Bosnia and Herzegovina began its COVID-19 vaccination campaign on 12 February 2021.

On 27 March 2021, Tegeltija spoke in a telephone call with European Commission president Ursula von der Leyen about the epidemiological situation caused by the pandemic, where it was agreed, among other things, that in the second half of April 2021, the delivery of 650,000 Pfizer–BioNTech COVID-19 vaccines, donated by the European Union, to the countries of the Western Balkans will begin, and that those vaccines will be completely free.

On 6 April 2021, anti-governmental protests "Fight for Life" were held by a group of citizens and activists in Sarajevo in front of the Parliamentary Assembly and the Federal Government, seeking resignations from Tegeltija and Federal Prime Minister Fadil Novalić, due to lack of leadership during the pandemic and late procurement of COVID-19 vaccines. Further anti-governmental protests were held eleven days later, on 17 April as well.

On 22 July 2021, Tegeltija called on the competent authorities in Bosnia and Herzegovina to speed up the process of vaccination of the country's population, saying "So far, we have received about 1.6 million vaccines, start with the mass immunization."

On 18 October 2021, Tegeltija's government adopted the information of the Ministry of Civil Affairs on the need to conclude a contract on compensation between the Council of Ministers and Janssen Pharmaceuticals, thus creating preconditions for the delivery of the previously paid COVID-19 vaccines manufactured by Johnson & Johnson. On 16 December 2021, the cabinet gave its consent for the introduction of COVID certificates at the national level.

=== Foreign policy ===
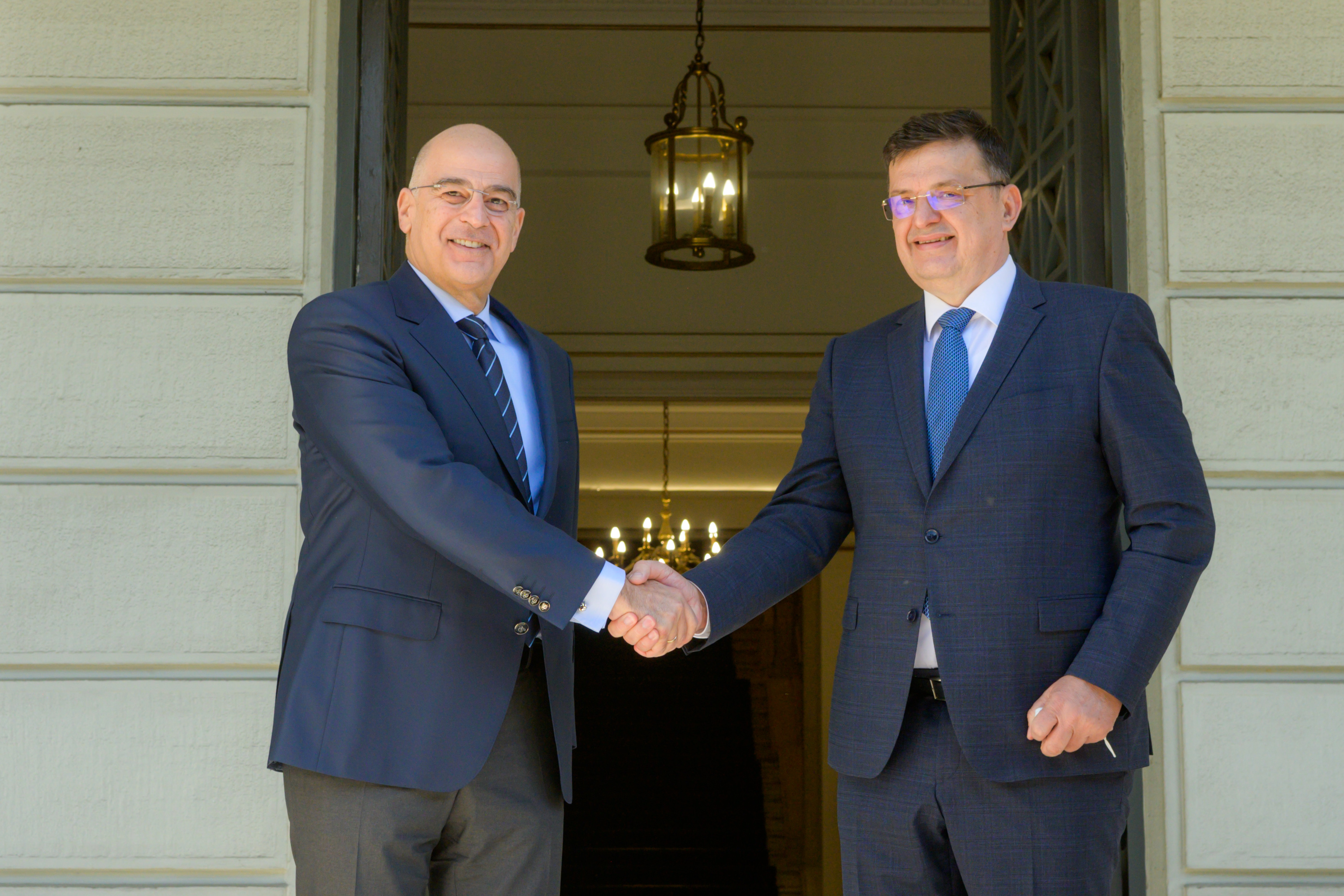
Tegeltija with Greek Foreign Minister Nikos Dendias, 8 April 2022

In April 2021, Tegeltija reacted to a supposed non-paper sent by Slovenian Prime Minister Janez Janša, regarding possible border changes in the Western Balkans, saying that he isn't "a man of inflammatory rhetoric" and that he "will not deal with fictional papers."

On 24 May 2021, Tegeltija met with Montenegrin Prime Minister Zdravko Krivokapić in Sarajevo.

On 18 June 2021, he met with Austrian Chancellor Sebastian Kurz at a Western Balkans summit in Vienna, where they discussed about cooperation between Bosnia and Herzegovina and Austria, security and migration.

On 3 December 2021, Tegeltija met with Croatian Prime Minister Andrej Plenković at the Central European Initiative forum held in Budva, Montenegro. On 13 December, Plenković came to Sarajevo on a state visit in Bosnia and Herzegovina and once again met with Tegeltija, having talks about more economic and infrastructural cooperation.

While attending the Winter Olympics opening ceremony on 5 February 2022, Tegeltija met with Chinese Premier Li Keqiang, with whom he discussed about political and economical topics.

==== European Union ====
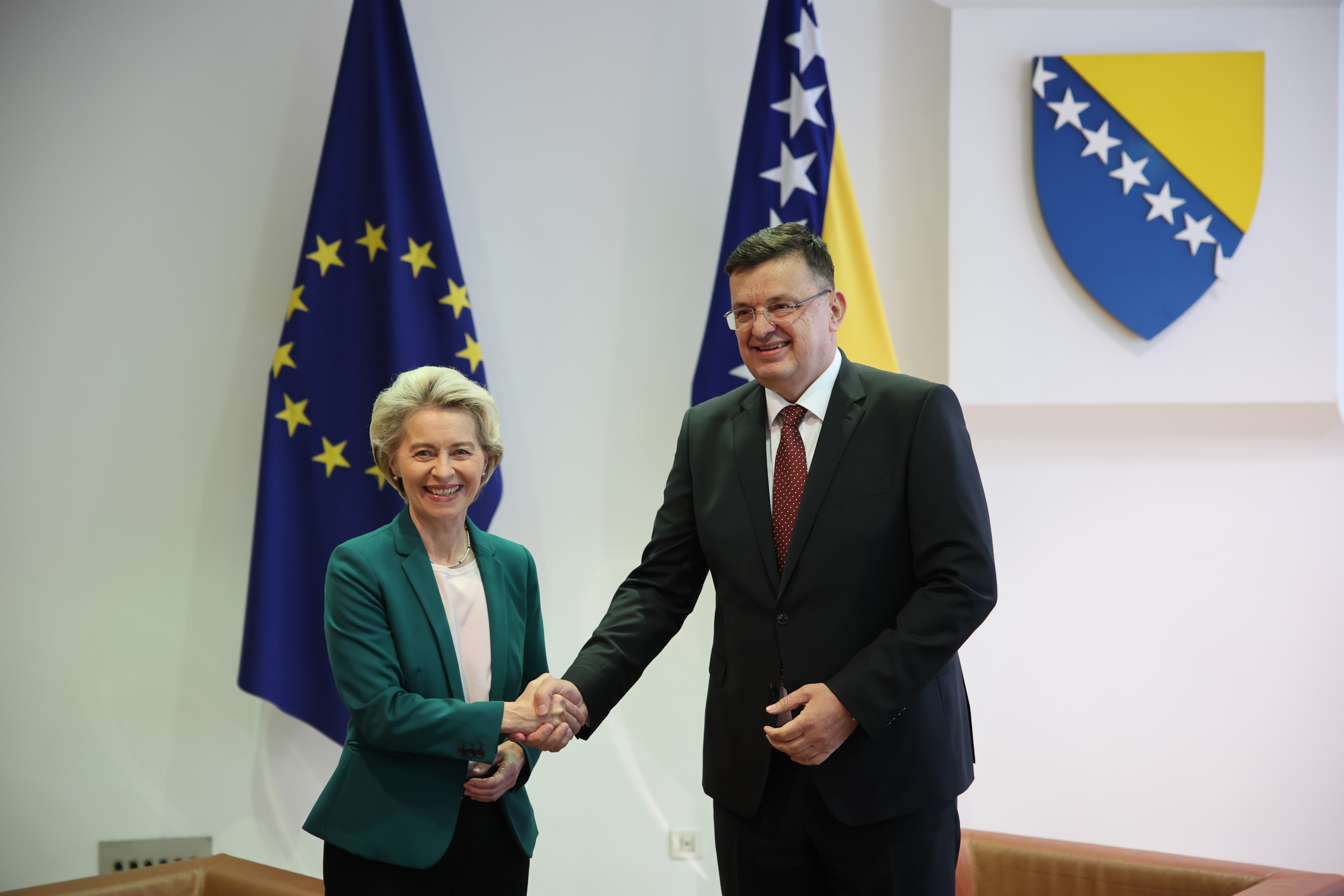
Tegeltija greeting European Commission President Ursula von der Leyen, 28 October 2022

At a Council of Ministers session held on 23 June 2021, Tegeltija's cabinet, much to his disapproval, supported a new law regarding the High Judicial and Prosecutorial Council of Bosnia and Herzegovina (VSTV BiH), a legal solution, which is a condition for obtaining European Union candidate status, as well as other tranches of EU microfinance support. On 30 June, Tegeltija spoke in a telephone call with German chancellor Angela Merkel about the future of EU potential enlargement, ahead of the 2021 Berlin Process Summit. On 14 September 2021, Tegeltija met in person with Merkel at a Western Balkans meeting in Tirana, Albania, where they talked about the COVID-19 pandemic, Berlin Process, EU enlargement and the political situation in Bosnia and Herzegovina. On 30 September, alongside Andrej Plenković and European Commission president Ursula von der Leyen, Tegeltija opened the Svilaj border checkpoint and a bridge over the nearby Sava river, which bears the internationally important freeway Pan-European Corridor Vc.

In November 2022, alongside other Western Balkans leaders and in the presence of German Chancellor Olaf Scholz, Tegeltija signed three agreements on mobility at the Berlin Process Summit, which enable travel with an ID card in the region, mutual recognition of university diplomas and professional qualifications. On 15 December 2022, during his chairmanship, Bosnia and Herzegovina was recognised by the European Union as a candidate country for accession following the decision of the European Council.

== Later career ==
On 25 January 2023, following the formation of a new Council of Ministers presided over by Borjana Krišto, Tegeltija was appointed as the new Minister of Finance and Treasury and also as vice-chairman of the Council of Ministers within Krišto's government. On 18 May 2023, he was appointed director of the Indirect Taxation Authority of Bosnia and Herzegovina. On 15 June 2023, Tegeltija was officially confirmed as the new director, therefore resigning as a government minister.

== Personal life ==
Zoran is married to Dušanka Tegeltija, and together they have two daughters, Jelena and Ivana. They live in Mrkonjić Grad.

Political offices
| Preceded by Denis Zvizdić | Chairman of the Council of Ministers of Bosnia and Herzegovina; 2019–2023 | Succeeded by Borjana Krišto |
| Preceded by Vjekoslav Bevanda | Minister of Finance and Treasury; 2023 | Succeeded by Srđan Amidžić |
