= Željko Komšić =

Bosnian Croat politician (born 1964)

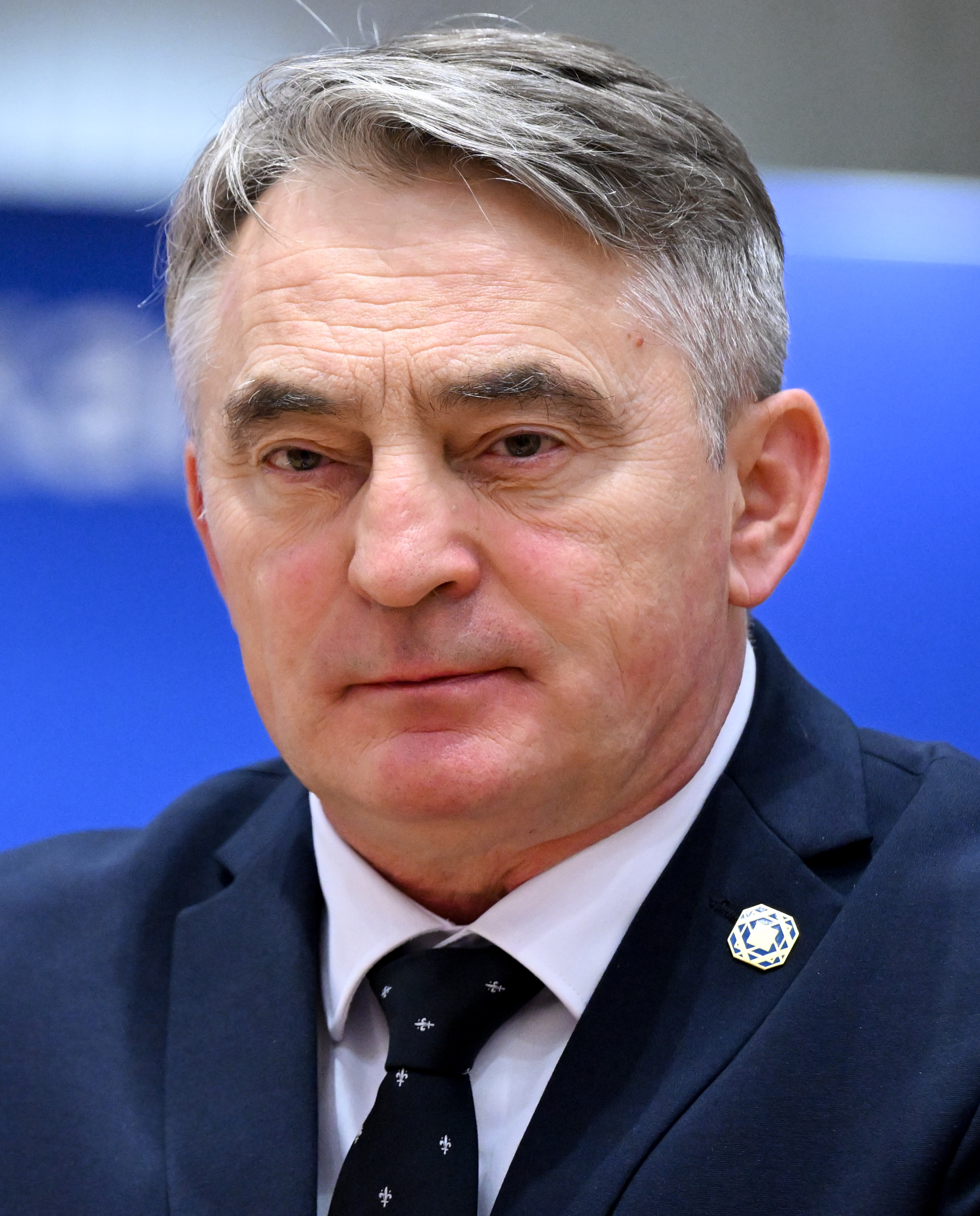
- Komšić in 2025

Croat member of the Presidency of Bosnia and Herzegovina
- In office 20 November 2018 – 16 November 2026 (Note: Serving as the Chairman of the Presidency from 20 July 2019 to 20 March 2020, from 20 July 2021 to 20 March 2022, from 16 July 2023 to 16 March 2024, and from 16 July 2025 to 16 March 2026.)
- Prime Minister: Denis Zvizdić; Zoran Tegeltija; Borjana Krišto
- Preceded by: Dragan Čović
- Succeeded by: Darijana Filipović
- In office 6 November 2006 – 17 November 2014 (Note: Serving as the Chairman of the Presidency from 6 July 2007 to 6 March 2008, from 6 July 2009 to 6 March 2010, from 10 July 2011 to 10 March 2012, and from 10 July 2013 to 10 March 2014.)
- Prime Minister: Adnan Terzić; Nikola Špirić; Vjekoslav Bevanda
- Preceded by: Ivo Miro Jović
- Succeeded by: Dragan Čović
Parliamentary offices
Member of the House of Representatives
In office 9 December 2014 – 20 November 2018
Constituency	3rd Electoral Unit
Additional positions
President of the Democratic Front
Incumbent
Assumed office 7 April 2013
Preceded by	Office established

Personal details
- Born: 20 January 1964 (age 62) Sarajevo, SR Bosnia and Herzegovina, SFR Yugoslavia
- Party: Democratic Front (2013–present)
- Other political affiliations: Social Democratic Party (1997–2012)
- Spouse: Sabina Komšić (m. 1996)
- Children: 1
- Education: University of Sarajevo (LLB)
- Awards: Order of the Golden Lily

Military service
- Allegiance: Republic of Bosnia and Herzegovina
- Branch/service: Army of the Republic of Bosnia and Herzegovina
- Years of service: 1992–1996
- Rank: Platoon leader
- Unit: Hrasno Territorial Defence; 101st Motorised Brigade; 1st Corps of the Armed Forces of Republic of Bosnia and Herzegovina
- Battles/wars: Bosnian War

Željko Komšić (Croatian pronunciation: [ˈʒɛːʎkɔ ˈkɔmʃitɕ]; born 20 January 1964) is a Bosnian politician who served as the Croat member of the Presidency of Bosnia and Herzegovina from 2006 to 2014 and from 2018 to 2026. He was also a member of the national House of Representatives from 2014 to 2018.

Born in 1964, Komšić earned a degree in law from the University of Sarajevo in 1988, and later attended a specialization program at Georgetown University. He served in the Army of the Republic of Bosnia and Herzegovina during the Bosnian War, and was awarded with the Order of the Golden Lily. Following the war, Komšić worked at the Federal Ministry of Displaced Persons and Refugees, before being elected municipal mayor of Novo Sarajevo in 2000. He then served as the Bosnian ambassador to FR Yugoslavia. In the 2006 general election, Komšić successfully ran for a seat in the Presidency of Bosnia and Herzegovina as the Croat member. He was re-elected to the office in the 2010 election. Komšić was a prominent figure of the Social Democratic Party, until he left it in 2012 to establish the Democratic Front a year later. Following the end of his term in the Presidency, he was elected to the national House of Representatives in the 2014 election.

Komšić was elected to the Presidency for a third term in the 2018 general election. He was re-elected for a fourth term in the 2022 general election, and has since then become the longest-serving Presidency member overall. He is also the only one to have served more than two terms.

Although elected as the Croat member of Bosnia’s Presidency, Komšić is considered by many Bosnian Croats to be an illegitimate representative, as he was elected largely by Bosniak voters in the Federation, where voters can choose both the Bosniak and Croat members. As a result, his support among Croats has remained very low throughout his term.

== Early life and education ==
Komšić was born on 20 January 1964 in Sarajevo to a Bosnian Croat father, Marko Komšić from Kiseljak, and Bosnian Serb mother, Danica Stanić (1941 – 1 August 1992) from Doboj. He has a sister. During the siege of Sarajevo, his mother was killed by a sniper from the Army of Republika Srpska while in her apartment, an event often seen as a turning point in his life. At the time, Komšić was serving in the Army of the Republic of Bosnia and Herzegovina, where he later received the Order of the Golden Lily for military merit.

He earned a law degree from the University of Sarajevo’s Faculty of Law in 1988 and also attended Georgetown University’s Walsh School of Foreign Service in Washington, D.C., where he participated in the Georgetown Leadership Seminar in 2003.

From 1996 to 1998, Komšić worked at the Federal Ministry of Displaced Persons and Refugees.

== Early political career ==
After the war, Komšić began his political career as a member of the Social Democratic Party (SDP BiH). From 1998 to 2000, he served as president of the Sarajevo City Council and was also a councilman in the Novo Sarajevo municipality. He later served as mayor of Novo Sarajevo until 2001.

After the 2000 parliamentary election, when the "Alliance for Democratic Change" came to power, Komšić was appointed ambassador to the Federal Republic of Yugoslavia in Belgrade. He resigned from this post after the 2002 general election, when the SDP BiH returned to opposition.

From 2003 to 2004, he served as deputy to Sarajevo mayor Muhidin Hamamdžić, and in the 2004 municipal elections he was re-elected as mayor of Novo Sarajevo.

== First presidency (2006–2014) ==
=== 2006 general election ===
Komšić was the SDP BiH candidate for the Croat member of the Presidency of Bosnia and Herzegovina in the 2006 general election. He won 116,062 votes (39.6%), ahead of Ivo Miro Jović (26.1%), Božo Ljubić (18.2%) and other candidates. He was sworn into office on 6 November 2006.

His victory is often attributed to divisions within the HDZ BiH bloc, which split the Croat vote, while he also received significant support from Bosniak voters. As a result, many Bosnian Croats viewed him as an illegitimate representative, arguing he was elected largely without Croat backing. Croat political leaders and some Catholic Church figures called on him to step down, claiming the result undermined the intended system of ethnic representation, but legal challenges did not overturn the outcome. Even Haris Silajdžić stated that Komšić’s election was unfair and could alienate Croats from Bosnia and Herzegovina.

=== 2010 general election ===
In the 2010 general election, Komšić was re-elected as the Croat member of the Presidency, nearly tripling his vote total to 337,065 (60.6%), ahead of Borjana Krišto (19.7%) and others.

His victory was strongly contested by Croat representatives, who argued that the electoral system allows Bosniak-majority voters in the Federation to effectively decide the Croat member of the Presidency. Komšić did not win in any Croat-majority municipality, with most of his support coming from Bosniak-majority areas. This reinforced claims that he lacked legitimacy among Croats and strengthened calls for a separate Croat federal unit.

=== Tenure ===
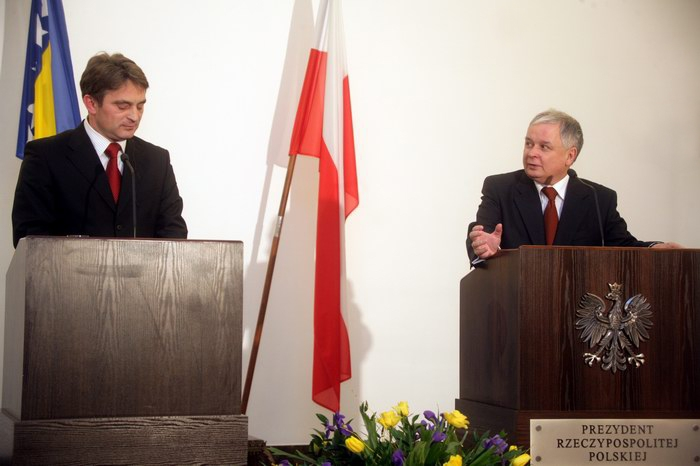
Komšić during a press conference with Polish President Lech Kaczyński, 17 December 2007

During his presidency, collaboration within the tripartite Presidency proved difficult, with frequent deadlocks between Komšić and Serb member Nebojša Radmanović, who often aligned with Republika Srpska's separatist positions, as well as shifting relations with Bosniak members Haris Silajdžić (2006–2010) and Bakir Izetbegović (2010–2014). These disagreements centered on constitutional reforms (centralizing state institutions and reforming electoral laws), the balance of power between state and entity institutions, and EU accession requirements, often resulting in stalled decision-making.

In 2008, controversy arose after Haris Silajdžić stated that Bosnia and Herzegovina has one language with three names. The statement drew criticism from Croat parties and Republika Srpska leadership. Komšić responded that no individual has the authority to determine how many languages are spoken in the country.

A 2010 National Democratic Institute survey identified Komšić as the most popular politician among Bosniak voters.

While his political stance attracted support from non-nationalist and civic-oriented voters, Croat parties criticized it as undermining the constitutional protections of constituent peoples. In July 2012, internal disagreements led Komšić to leave the SDP BiH, triggered by divisions over proposed constitutional changes that he claimed sidelined his input on civic reforms. In April 2013, alongside other dissidents, he co-founded the Democratic Front (DF), a civic-oriented, center-left party focused on anti-corruption and state reform.

== Second presidency (2018–2026) ==
=== 2018 general election ===
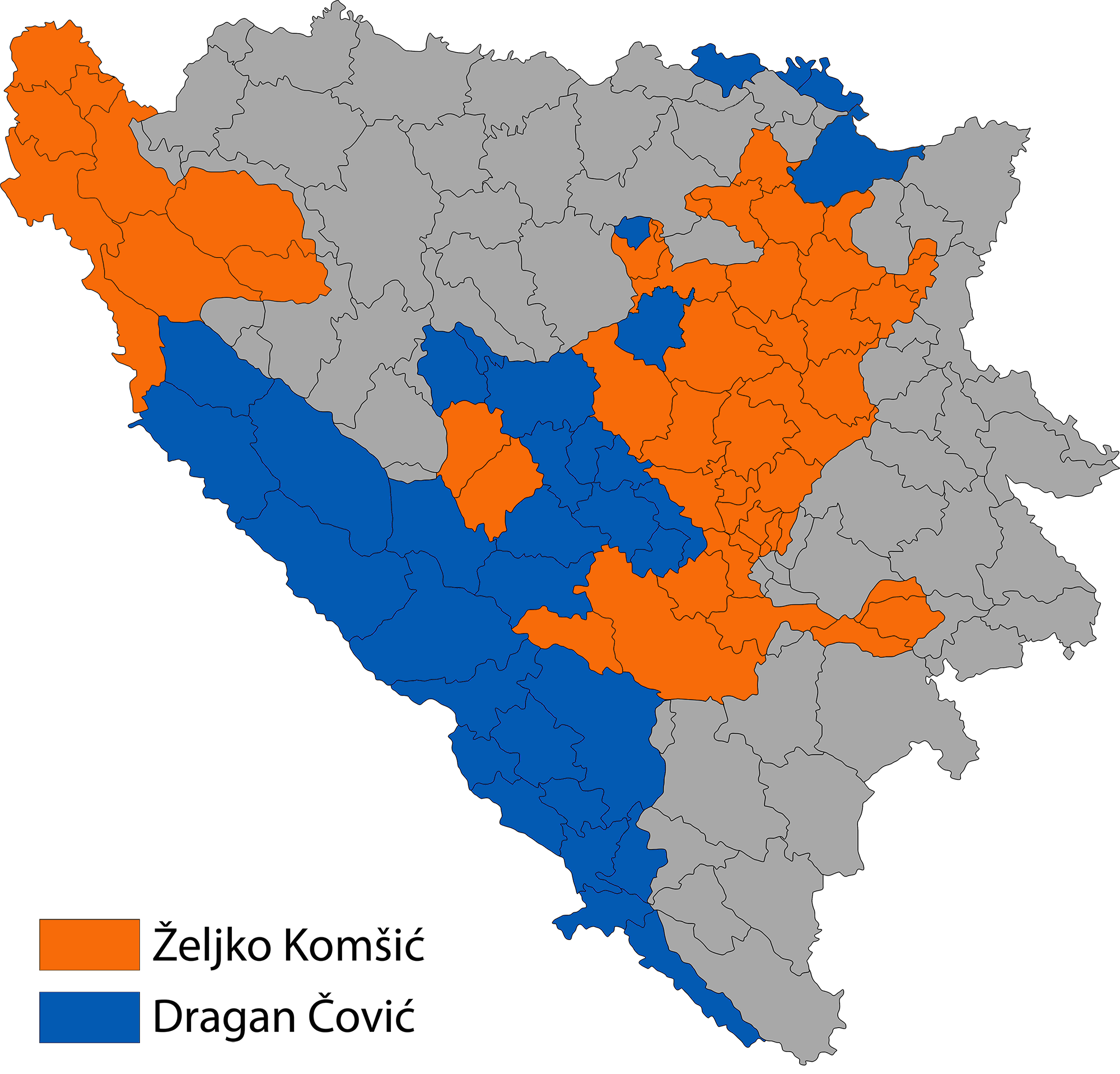
Results of the 2018 general election by municipality for the Croat member of the Presidency; Komšić failed to win in a single Croat-majority municipality

After not running in the 2014 general election due to term limits, Komšić announced his candidacy in January 2018 and was re-elected in the 2018 election with 52.64% of the vote, defeating Dragan Čović (36.14%).

His victory again sparked controversy, as his support came largely from Bosniak-majority areas. Croatian Prime Minister Andrej Plenković criticized the outcome, arguing that one constituent people was electing another’s representative, while Komšić accused Croatia of interfering in Bosnia and Herzegovina’s sovereignty.

Protests under the slogan “Not My President” were held in Croat-majority areas, including Mostar and Široki Brijeg on 11–12 October 2018, organized by Croat nationalist groups who denounced Komšić as a "second Bosniak member" unfit to represent Croat interests. Demonstrators highlighted the disparity in vote distribution, with Komšić underperforming in core Croat cantons yet prevailing due to Federation-wide tallies.

Additionally, several Croat-majority municipalities declared him persona non grata. Members of The Bridge party in the Croatian Parliament proposed a similar measure at the state level, though it was not adopted.

=== 2022 general election ===
Komšić was re-elected for a fourth term in the 2022 general election with 55.80% of the vote, defeating Borjana Krišto (44.20%). As in previous elections, his support largely came from Bosniak-majority areas, prompting renewed criticism from Croat political representatives.

He was sworn in on 16 November 2022 alongside Denis Bećirović and Željka Cvijanović.

=== Tenure ===
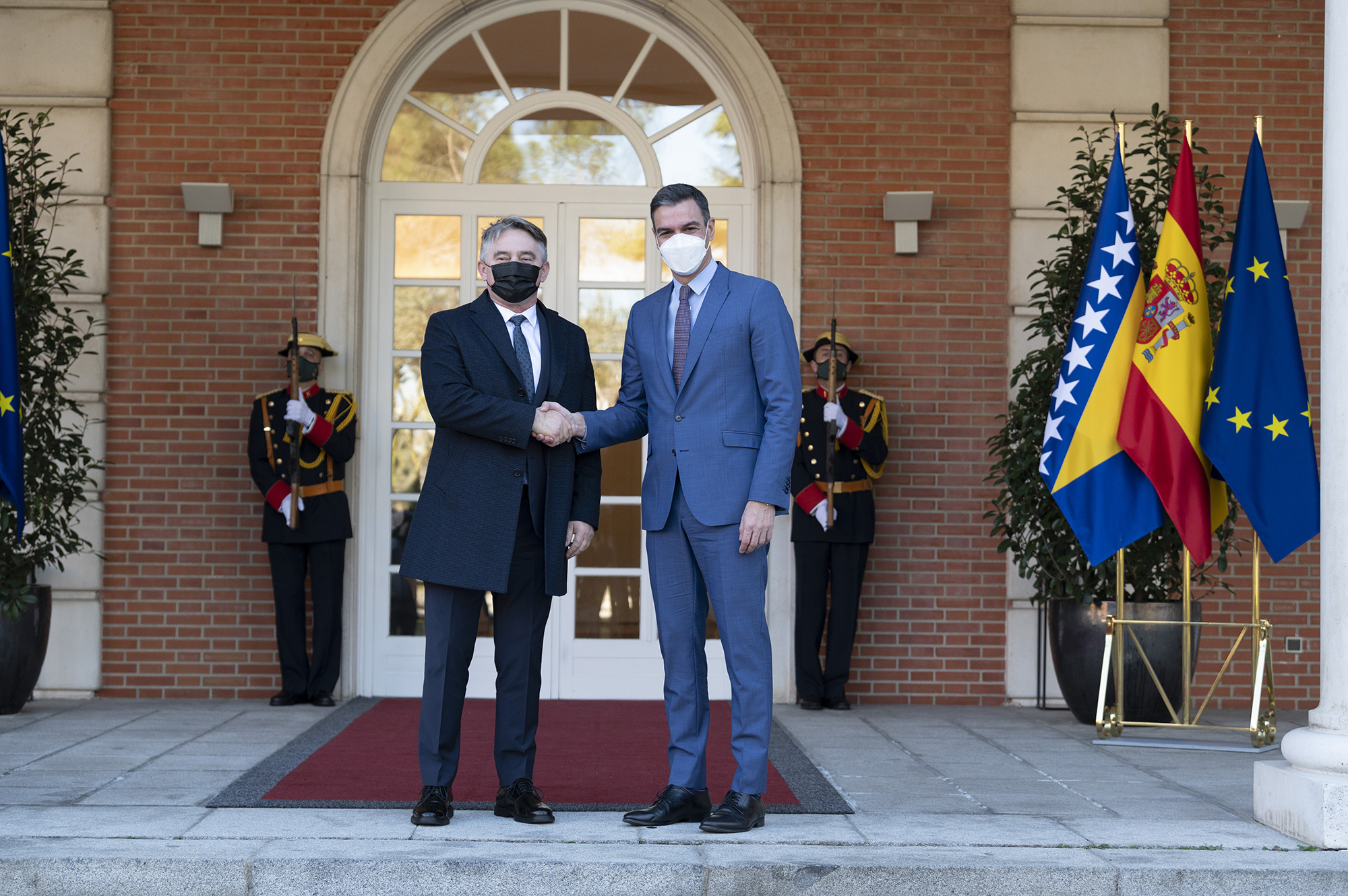
Komšić with Spanish Prime Minister Pedro Sánchez, 9 February 2022

In March 2019, Komšić appointed Serbian politician and businessman Čedomir Jovanović as his advisor.

In May 2021, disagreements within the Presidency became evident: while Komšić and Šefik Džaferović attended a joint military exercise with the United States Army, fellow Presidency member Milorad Dodik refused. Later that year, Komšić and Džaferović acted without Dodik’s consent to address wildfires in Herzegovina, highlighting institutional gridlock.

During miners’ protests in November 2021, Komšić called for the resignation of key government officials.

Following the October 2022 election, the Presidency confirmed Borjana Krišto as Chairwoman of the Council of Ministers in December; Komšić voted against, citing the absence of a clear program.

==== COVID-19 pandemic ====
As the COVID-19 pandemic in Bosnia and Herzegovina started in March 2020, the Presidency announced Armed Forces' placement of quarantine tents at the country's borders intended for Bosnian citizens returning home. Every Bosnian citizen arriving to the country was obligated to self-quarantine for 14 days starting from the day of arrival. Tents were set up on the northern border with Croatia.

On 2 March 2021, Serbian president Aleksandar Vučić came to Sarajevo and met with Komšić, Džaferović and Dodik, and donated 10,000 dozes of AstraZeneca COVID-19 vaccines for the COVID-19 pandemic. Three days later, on 5 March, Slovenian president Borut Pahor also came to Sarajevo and met with Komšić, Džaferović and Dodik, and stated that Slovenia will also donate 4,800 AstraZeneca COVID-19 vaccines for the pandemic.

==== Foreign policy ====
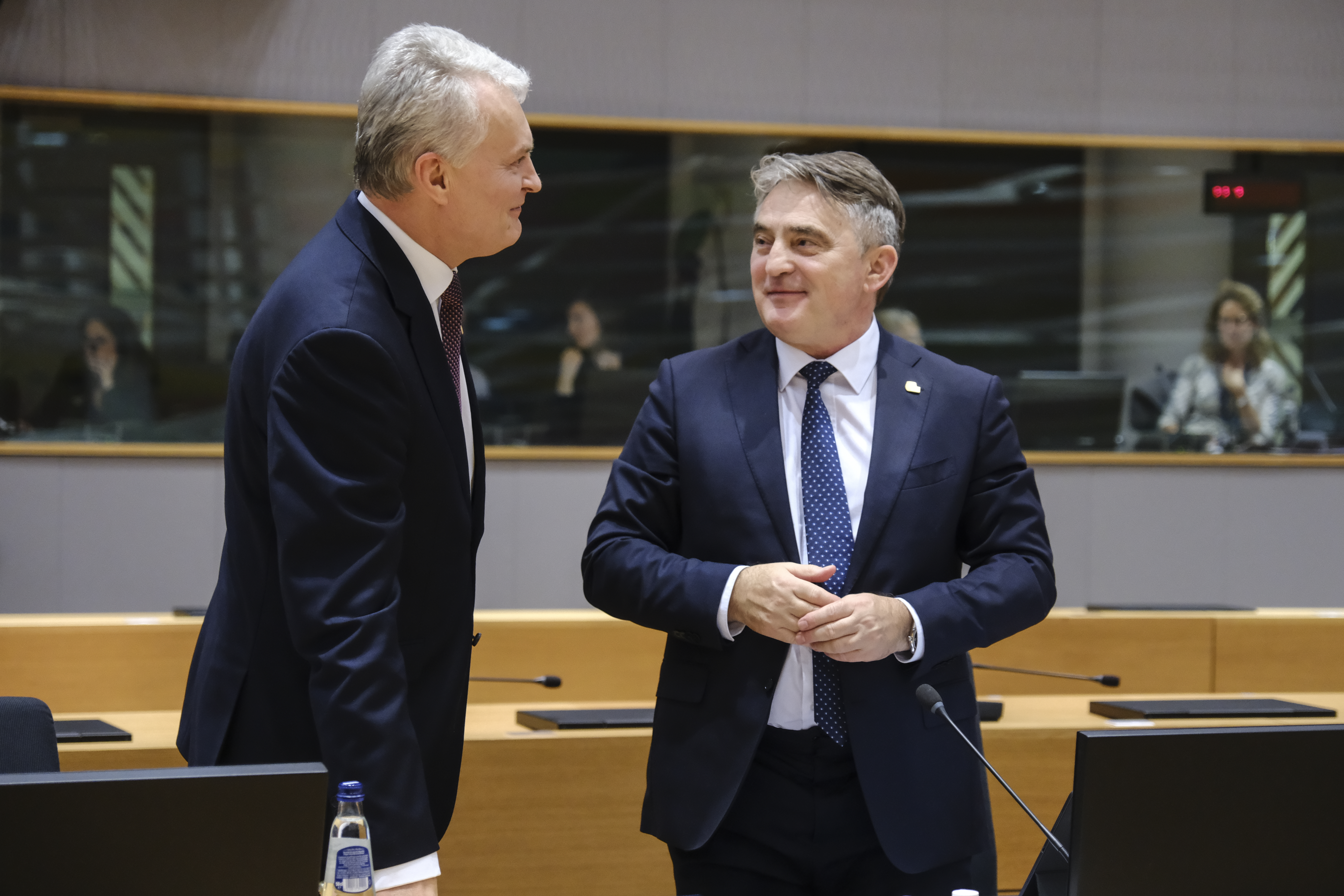
Komšić alongside Lithuanian President Gitanas Nausėda, 13 December 2023

In October 2018, Komšić announced that Bosnia and Herzegovina might sue Croatia over the construction of the Pelješac Bridge. The construction of the bridge, paid largely with EU funding, began on 30 July 2018 to connect Croatia's territory and was supported by Komšić's main election opponent Dragan Čović.

In December 2020, right before a state visit of Russian foreign minister Sergey Lavrov, Komšić refused to attend the visit because of Lavrov's disrespect to Bosnia and Herzegovina and decision to firstly visit only Bosnian Serb leader Milorad Dodik and later on the presidency consisting of Šefik Džaferović, Dodik and Komšić. Shortly later, Džaferović too refused to attend Lavrov's visit because of the same reasons as Komšić.

In September 2021, Komšić went to New York City to address the United Nations General Assembly at its headquarters. There he held bilateral meetings with United Nations Secretary-General António Guterres and Austrian president Alexander Van der Bellen on 21 September. On 22 September, Komšić addressed the General Assembly, speaking about the political challenges in Bosnia and Herzegovina, the COVID-19 pandemic and climate change. On 23 September, he met with Montenegrin and Kosovar presidents Milo Đukanović and Vjosa Osmani. In November 2021, Komšić attended the 26th United Nations Climate Change Conference, where he was welcomed by British Prime Minister Boris Johnson and UN Secretary-General António Guterres.

On 17 January 2022, he met with Pope Francis in Vatican City. Following their meeting, Francis praised Komšić, saying that "he is a good person." On 9 February 2022, Komšić went to Madrid, where he held a bilateral meeting with Spanish Prime Minister Pedro Sánchez and also spoke with King Felipe VI.

Following Russia recognizing the Donetsk People's Republic and the Luhansk People's Republic as independent states on 21 February, which are disputed territories in the Ukrainian region of Donbas, Komšić strongly condemned "Russia’s attack on the territory of Ukraine." On 24 February, Russian president Vladimir Putin ordered a large-scale invasion of Ukraine, marking a dramatic escalation of the Russo-Ukrainian War that began in 2014. Regarding the invasion, Komšić said Bosnia and Herzegovina would support Ukraine within its capacity.

===== Balkan non-papers =====
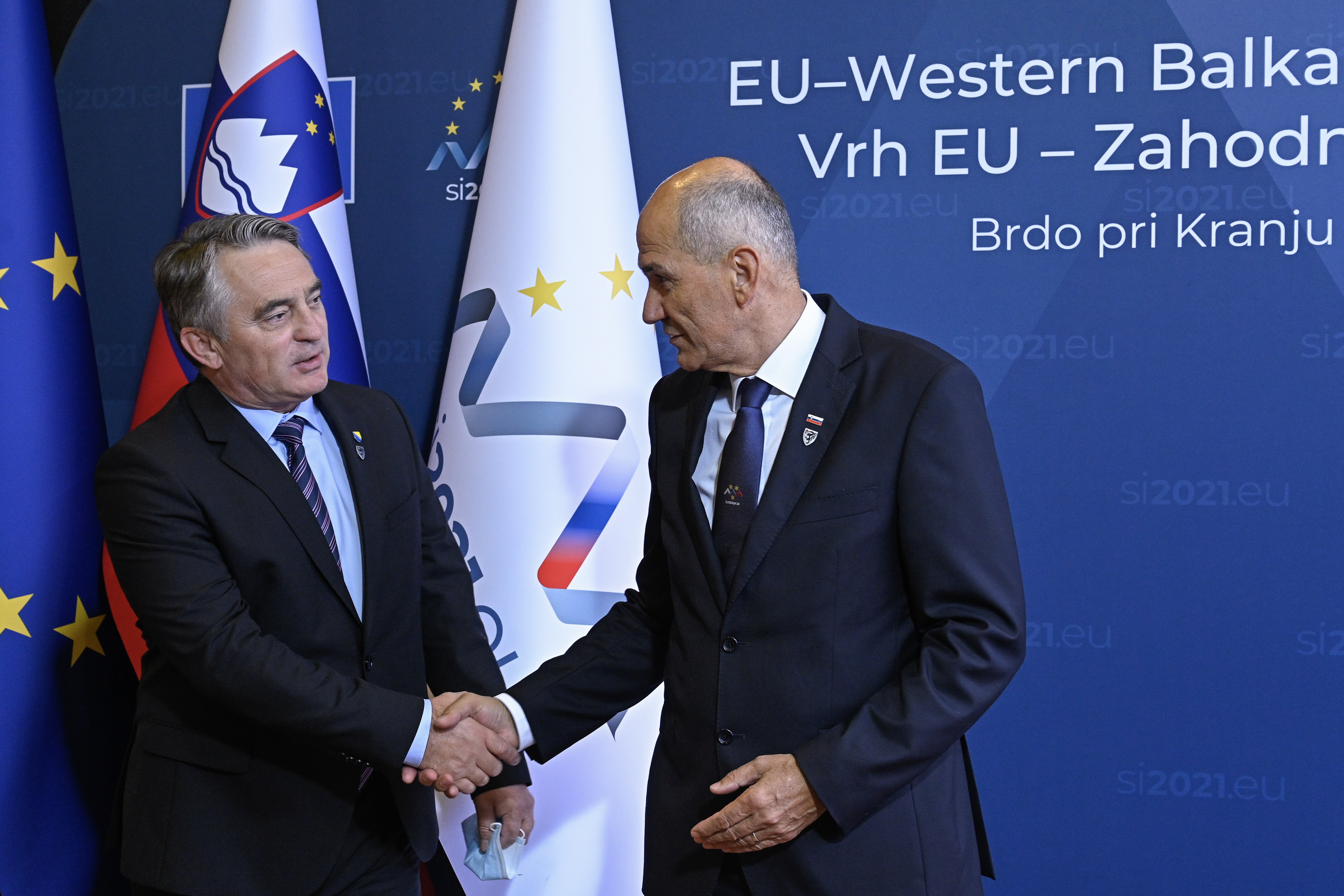
Komšić greeting Slovenian Prime Minister Janez Janša in October 2021, six months after the publishing of the non-papers

In April 2021, Komšić sent a non-paper to EU foreign ministers, fiercely criticizing EU Delegations for their too good attitude towards the nationalistic Bosnian parties SNSD and the HDZ BiH. His paper focuses on Russian influence, interference of Croatia and Serbia in the internal affairs of Bosnia and Herzegovina and the combination of relations between the HDZ BiH and the SNSD, but also criticism of the poor behavior of the EU in Bosnia and Herzegovina. The same month, Komšić reacted to a supposed non-paper sent by Slovenian Prime Minister Janez Janša, regarding possible border changes in the Western Balkans, saying that it was "all already orchestrated and only God knows what the outcome will be."

The first non-paper's plans and ideas were heavily criticized and reacted to by many political leaders from Bosnia and Herzegovina, Serbia, Croatia, Montenegro, Slovenia, North Macedonia, as well as by politicians from the European Union and Russia. A second non-paper, which first appeared in Kosovo's Albanian-language media in April 2021, proposed that Serbia recognize Kosovo's independence by February 2022 and that Serb-majority North Kosovo be granted autonomy in return for Serbia's recognition.

===== Gaza war =====
After Hamas attacked Israel in October 2023, Komšić remarked that Hamas' actions are the actions of desperate people and that their actions should be observed within a wider context. He accused the Chairwoman of the Council of Ministers Borjana Krišto for expressing her support for Israel, calling her statement "hasty and selfish". Israeli ambassador to Bosnia and Herzegovina Galit Peleg criticised Komšić's statement and defended Krišto, to which Komšić responded by calling Israel's ambassador "a malicious lying fool or a manipulated but also malicious fool" and said "that pervert", referring to Israeli businessman Amir Gross Kabiri, "who persuaded you to this lie and stupidity, because you obviously neither looked at nor listened to my statement and to whom money is more important than the fact that earning it with the followers of the same policy and ideology that participated in the holocaust of your people, is the problem of your country."

In October 2025, following the brokering of the Gaza peace plan and the start of a third ceasefire in the Gaza war, the Bosnian Presidency unanimously decided to nominate U.S. president Donald Trump for the Nobel Peace Prize for his "commitment to establishing lasting peace in Gaza" and the Middle East. This marked the first official nomination for the 2026 edition of the award.

== Political positions ==
=== Domestic policy ===
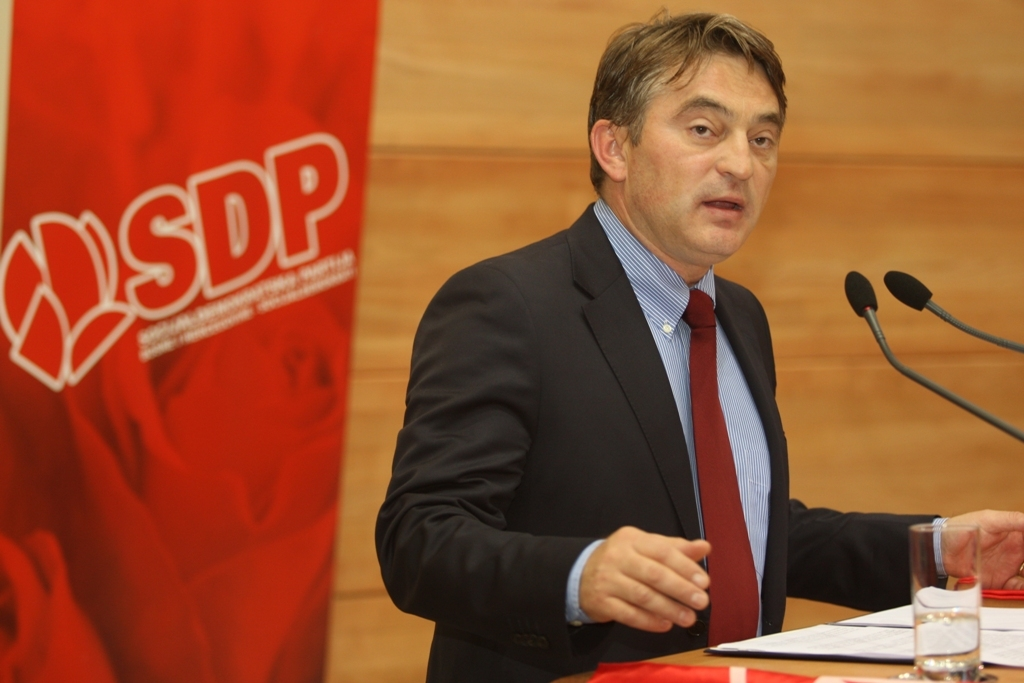
Komšić speaking at a Social Democratic Party congress, 29 October 2011

Komšić is a prominent advocate of a civic model of the state, arguing that Bosnia and Herzegovina should be organized primarily around individual citizenship rather than ethnic affiliation. He has frequently criticized the constitutional and political framework established by the Dayton Peace Agreement, claiming that its system of ethnic power-sharing entrenches divisions, enables political blockades, and discriminates against citizens who do not identify with one of the three constituent peoples.

Komšić supports constitutional and electoral reforms aimed at strengthening state institutions and reducing the role of ethnic veto mechanisms. His views have often placed him in opposition to ethnonationalist parties in both entities of Bosnia and Herzegovina. Economically and socially, Komšić and the Democratic Front are generally positioned on the center-left, advocating social justice, workers' rights, and a stronger role for the state in ensuring social welfare.

=== Foreign policy ===
==== United States ====
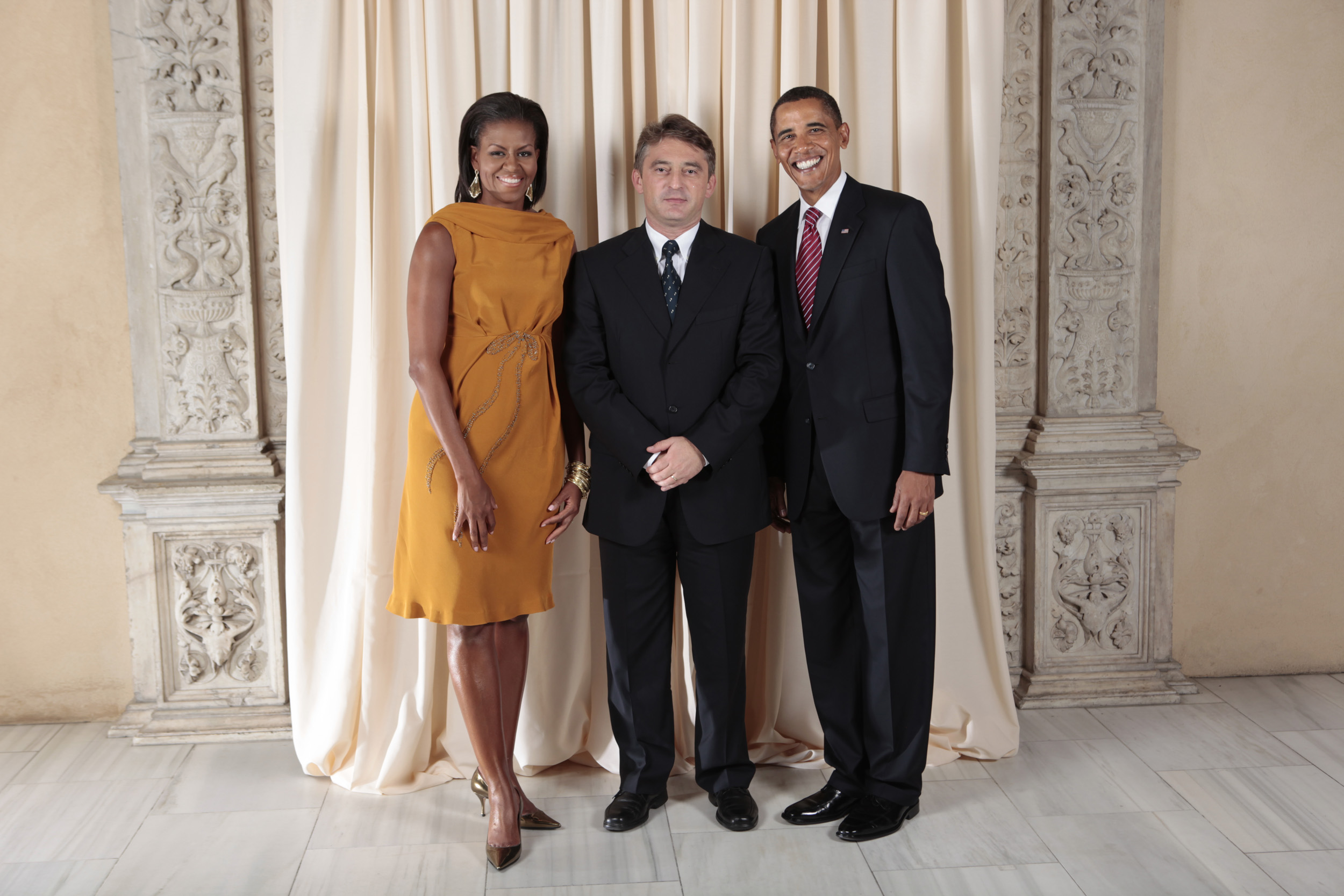
Komšić alongside U.S. President Barack Obama and First Lady Michelle Obama in New York City, 23 September 2009

Komšić has generally supported close relations between Bosnia and Herzegovina and the United States, viewing the U.S. as a key international partner in safeguarding the country’s sovereignty, territorial integrity, and post-war stability. He has acknowledged the role of the United States in brokering the Dayton Agreement, while also arguing that continued U.S. engagement is important for advancing democratic and constitutional reforms in Bosnia and Herzegovina. He has publicly aligned himself with U.S. policies that emphasize the strengthening of state institutions and opposition to secessionist or destabilizing political initiatives.

Komšić has also expressed support for U.S. sanctions imposed on political actors accused of undermining the constitutional order of Bosnia and Herzegovina, describing such measures as instruments for preserving peace and stability. His positions have often contrasted with those of political leaders in the country who oppose NATO integration or advocate greater ethnic autonomy.

Conversely, Komšić's commentary has occasionally also included criticism of perceived shifts in U.S. policy; in a January 2024 interview, he suggested that aspects of U.S. policy in Bosnia and Herzegovina "seemed aligned with the strategic interests of Croatia rather than exclusively promoting Bosnia and Herzegovina's institutional stability."

==== Turkey ====
On 16 March 2021, Komšić went on a state visit to Turkey to meet with Turkish President Recep Tayyip Erdoğan. While there, Erdoğan promised to donate Bosnia and Herzegovina 30,000 COVID-19 vaccines for the COVID-19 pandemic. Also on the meeting, Bosnia and Herzegovina and Turkey agreed on mutual recognition and exchange of driving licenses, as well as signing an agreement on cooperation in infrastructure and construction projects, which also refers to the construction of a highway from Bosnia and Herzegovina's capital Sarajevo to Serbia's capital Belgrade; the agreement being signed by Minister of Communication and Traffic Vojin Mitrović.

On 27 August 2021, Erdoğan came to Sarajevo on a state visit in Bosnia and Herzegovina and met with all three Presidency members, having talks about more economic and infrastructural cooperation, as well as looking into the construction of the highway from Sarajevo to Belgrade. Also, a trilateral meeting between Turkey, Serbia and Bosnia and Herzegovina was agreed on.

==== European Union ====
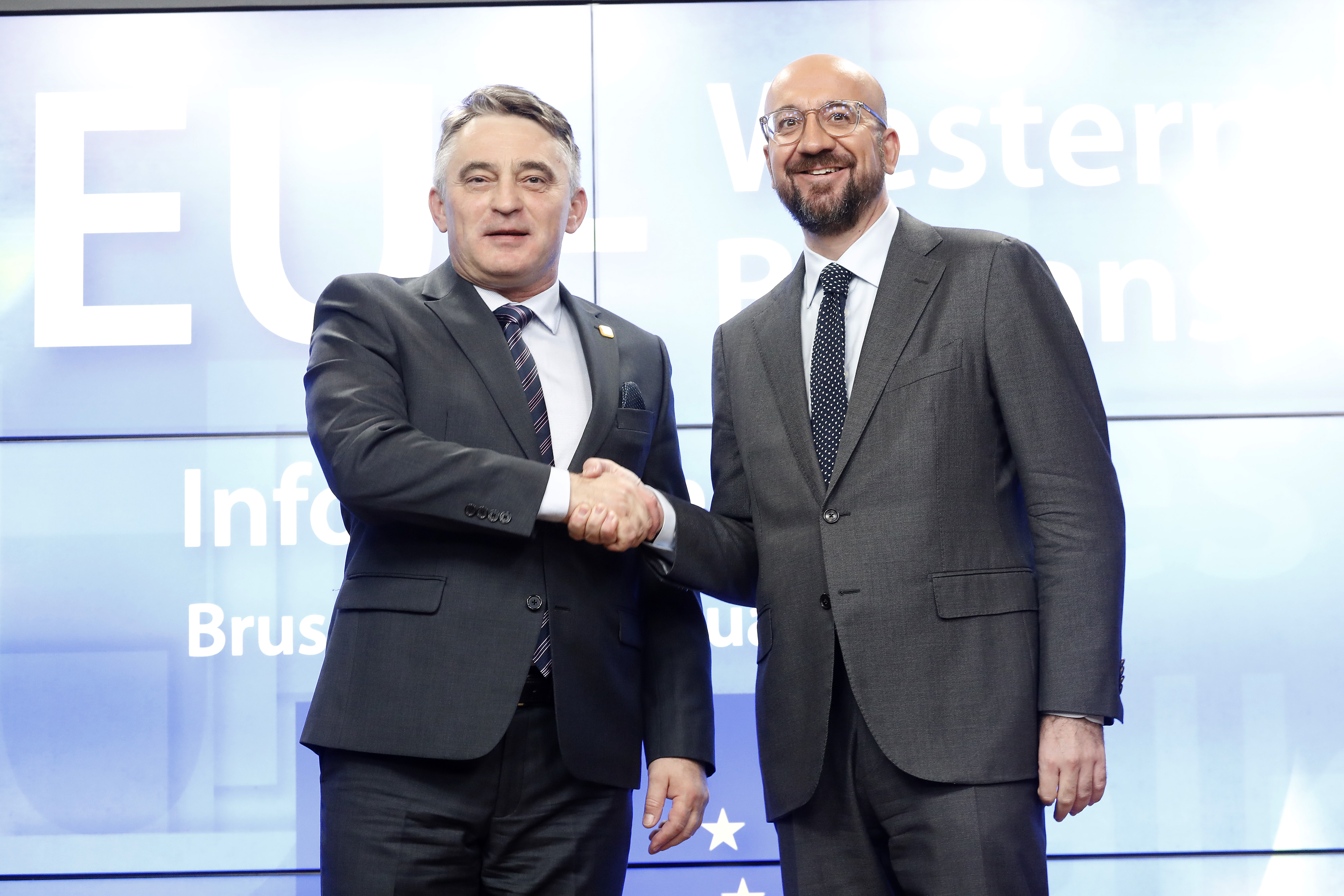
Komšić with European Council President Charles Michel, 16 February 2020

In September 2020, Komšić and his fellow Presidency members said that an EU candidate status for Bosnia and Herzegovina was possible in the year 2021 if the country "implements successful reforms."

On 30 September 2021, Komšić met with European Commission President Ursula von der Leyen at the Presidency Building in Sarajevo. This was part of von der Leyen's visit to Bosnia and Herzegovina, since she some hours before opened the Svilaj border checkpoint and a bridge over the nearby Sava river, which bears the internationally important freeway Pan-European Corridor Vc.

On 1 December 2021, Komšić met with German Minister of State for Europe Michael Roth, with the main topics of discussion being the political situation in Bosnia and Herzegovina, reform processes and activities on the country's EU path.

In December 2022, Bosnia and Herzegovina was recognised by the European Union as a candidate country for accession following the decision of the European Council, which Komšić strongly supported. On 8 February 2024, the Presidency unanimously adopted the decision to start negotiations with Frontex, one of the country’s key conditions for opening negotiations with the EU. On 21 March 2024, at a summit in Brussels, all 27 EU leaders, representing the European Council, unanimously agreed to open EU accession talks with Bosnia and Herzegovina after the Council of Ministers adopted two more European laws. Talks are set to begin following the impeding of more reforms.

=== Immigration ===
In September 2023, during the seventy-eighth session of the United Nations General Assembly, Komšić criticized aspects of international migration management, arguing that large and powerful countries "tend to attract the most educated and skilled migrants, thereby weakening the human capital base of smaller countries."

=== LGBT+ rights ===
In September 2019, Komšić supported the first BIH Pride March, the LGBTQ pride parade in Sarajevo, stating that "Bosnia and Herzegovina is a country where everybody can live their life as they wish", and adding that the march "is not an ordinary, but a first-class political event."

== Personal life ==
Komšić's maternal grandfather, Marijan Stanić from Kostajnica near Doboj, was allegedly a Chetnik during World War II, and died two years before Komšić was born, Komšić has never commented on these claims. His paternal family originates from Datići near Kiseljak, and his paternal uncle was an Ustaša who disappeared during World War II.

Komšić was baptised a Catholic, like his father. However, being a religious-skeptic, he left the Catholic Church. He is a self-described agnostic. His wife, Sabina, is an ethnic Bosniak. The couple has a daughter named Lana.

Komšić was one of the signatories of the Declaration on the Common Language for Croats, Serbs, Bosniaks and Montenegrins in 2017. He is an avid supporter of Sarajevo-based football club Željezničar.

On 2 July 2025, Komšić underwent a successful cardiac catheterization and had a stent implanted in Sarajevo.

== Orders ==
Award or decoration	Country	Awarded by	Year	Place
Order of the Golden Lily	Republic of Bosnia and Herzegovina	Alija Izetbegović	1995	Sarajevo

== Notes ==
Political offices
Preceded by Ivo Miro Jović	Croat member of the Presidency of Bosnia and Herzegovina; 2006–2014	Succeeded by Dragan Čović
Preceded by Nebojša Radmanović	Chairman of the Presidency of Bosnia and Herzegovina; 2007–2008	Succeeded by Haris Silajdžić
Preceded by Nebojša Radmanović	Chairman of the Presidency of Bosnia and Herzegovina; 2009–2010	Succeeded by Haris Silajdžić
Preceded by Nebojša Radmanović	Chairman of the Presidency of Bosnia and Herzegovina; 2011–2012	Succeeded by Bakir Izetbegović
Preceded by Nebojša Radmanović	Chairman of the Presidency of Bosnia and Herzegovina; 2013–2014	Succeeded by Bakir Izetbegović
Preceded by Dragan Čović	Croat member of the Presidency of Bosnia and Herzegovina; 2018–2026	Succeeded by Darijana Filipović
Preceded by Milorad Dodik	Chairman of the Presidency of Bosnia and Herzegovina; 2019–2020	Succeeded by Šefik Džaferović
Preceded by Milorad Dodik	Chairman of the Presidency of Bosnia and Herzegovina; 2021–2022	Succeeded by Šefik Džaferović
Preceded by Željka Cvijanović	Chairman of the Presidency of Bosnia and Herzegovina; 2023–2024	Succeeded by Denis Bećirović
Preceded by Željka Cvijanović	Chairman of the Presidency of Bosnia and Herzegovina; 2025–2026	Succeeded by Denis Bećirović
