= Ministry of Finance and Treasury (Bosnia and Herzegovina) =

Government ministry of Bosnia and Herzegovina

Ministry of Finance and Treasury of Bosnia and Herzegovina
- Ministarstvo finansija i trezora Bosne i Hercegovine; Министарство финансија и трезора Босне и Херцеговине

- Greece–Bosnia and Herzegovina Friendship Building, seat of the Ministry of Finance and Treasury of Bosnia and Herzegovina

Department overview
- Formed: 2000
- Headquarters: Sarajevo
- Minister responsible: Srđan Amidžić
- Website: http://mft.gov.ba/

The Ministry of Finance and Treasury of Bosnia and Herzegovina (Serbo-Croatian: Ministarstvo finansija i trezora Bosne i Hercegovine / Министарство финансија и трезора Босне и Херцеговине) is the governmental department which oversees the public finances of Bosnia and Herzegovina.

== History ==
After the first post-war 1996 Bosnian general election, the responsibilities of the current Ministry of Finance and Treasury of Bosnia and Herzegovina were first in the entity ministries of finance, the Ministry of Finance of the Federation of Bosnia and Herzegovina and the Republika Srpska.

However, the Ministry of Finance and Treasury of Bosnia and Herzegovina was established in 2000, and was in another government between the Party of Democratic Action (SDA), the Serb Democratic Party (SDS) and the Croatian Democratic Union of Bosnia and Herzegovina (HDZ BiH), and after the 1998 Bosnian general election began operating under the auspices of the Minister for Treasury of the Institutions of Bosnia and Herzegovina, who was then Spasoje Tuševljak (SDS).

== Organization ==
The Ministry of Finance and Treasury of Bosnia and Herzegovina consists of a total of eleven organizational units.

- Cabinet of the Minister
- Cabinet of the Deputy Minister
- Cabinet of the Secretary of the Minister
- Sector for legal, personnel, general and financial affairs
- Sector for Budget of Institutions of Bosnia and Herzegovina
- Sector for relations with financial institutions
- Public Debt Sector
- Sector for treasury operations
- Sector for Succession Affairs of the Former SFRY and Property Management of Bosnia and Herzegovina
- Sector for Fiscal Affairs
- Sector for financing European Union assistance programs and projects
- Internal Audit Department
- Sector for Coordination of International Economic Assistance

== List of ministers ==
=== Ministers of Finance and Treasury of Bosnia and Herzegovina (2000–present) ===
Political parties:
Serb Democratic Party (SDS)
Social Democratic Party (SDP BiH)
Croatian Democratic Union (HDZ BiH)
Alliance of Independent Social Democrats (SNSD)

No.	Portrait	Minister	Term start	Term end	Party
1		Spasoje Tuševljak	22 June 2000	22 February 2001	SDS
2		Božidar Matić	22 February 2001	17 July 2001	SDP BiH
3		Anto Domazet	17 July 2001	23 December 2002	SDP BiH
4		Ljerka Marić	23 December 2002	11 January 2007	HDZ BiH
5		Dragan Vrankić	11 January 2007	12 January 2012	HDZ BiH
6		Nikola Špirić	12 January 2012	31 March 2015	SNSD
7		Vjekoslav Bevanda	31 March 2015	25 January 2023	HDZ BiH
8		Zoran Tegeltija	25 January 2023	15 June 2023	SNSD
9		Srđan Amidžić	22 August 2023	Incumbent	SNSD

Source: Rulers.org

== See also ==
- Economy of Bosnia and Herzegovina
