= Indirect Taxation Authority of Bosnia and Herzegovina =

Bosnian government agency

- Uprava za indirektno oporezivanje Bosne i Hercegovine; UIO BiH

Agency overview
- Formed: 1 January 2005; 21 years ago
- Type: Revenue service
- Jurisdiction: Council of Ministers of Bosnia and Herzegovina
- Headquarters: Banja Luka, Bana Lazarevića, 78 000
- Agency executive: Zoran Tegeltija, Director
- Website: uino.gov.ba

The Indirect Taxation Authority of Bosnia and Herzegovina (ITA BiH; Bosnian/Croatian: Uprava za indirektno oporezivanje Bosne i Hercegovine, UIO BiH, Serbian: Управа за индиректно опорезивање Босне и Херцеговине, УИО БиХ) is the national revenue service responsible for the application and implementation of legal regulations related to indirect taxation in Bosnia and Herzegovina.

Within its competences, the ITA is responsible for the collection and distribution of revenues based on import and export duties (customs), excise taxes, value-added tax and all other taxes charged on goods and services, including sales taxes and tolls, other revenues and taxes, implementation of the policy adopted by the Council of Ministers and the opening and management of a single account for the collection and distribution of revenues for the account of the state, entities and district.

== History ==
The Law on Indirect Taxation, which was adopted by the Parliamentary Assembly of Bosnia and Herzegovina on 29 December 2003, serves as the legal framework for the establishment of a state body in the field of indirect taxation. On the basis of this law, in 2004, there was a merger of the then entity customs administrations and the Brčko District Administration. At the same time as this process, the Department for Taxes at the state level was formed, the goal of which was to develop and implement a unique value added tax system.

The date of establishment and the start of work of the ITA is considered as 1 January 2005. In July 2006, the Directorate for Indirect Taxation started with the registration of VAT payers, which represented the final stage of preparations for the introduction of the VAT system.

== Organization ==
The headquarters of the ITA is located in Banja Luka and there are also four regional offices in the cities of Sarajevo, Banja Luka, Tuzla and Mostar. From the units of lower organizational levels, there are also customs branches and 59 customs offices. The organizational structure of the ITA consists of sectors and four departments that make up the Cabinet of Directors. The ITA is an independent administrative organization that is responsible for its work to the Council of Ministers of Bosnia and Herzegovina through the board of directors. Zoran Tegeltija has been serving as the ITA's director since June 2023.

== Objectives ==
The Indirect Taxation Authority is the only body in Bosnia and Herzegovina responsible for the implementation of legal regulations and the policy of indirect taxation and for the collection and distribution of income from indirect taxes. This body is responsible for the collection of all indirect taxes at the state level, namely: value added taxes, customs duties, excise taxes and tolls. The objectives of the ITA are as follows:

- speeding up the flow of goods and people while simultaneously strengthening control;
- raising the level of security of citizens and developing cooperation with other domestic and international institutions, with the aim of harmonizing procedures and harmonizing legislation according to the requirements of the European Union;
- better exchange of information with other institutions and effective fight against illegal trade and any form of customs or tax fraud.
