= Council of Ministers of Bosnia and Herzegovina =

Executive branch of the government of Bosnia and Herzegovina

- Vijeće ministara Bosne i Hercegovine; Савјет министара Босне и Херцеговине
- Coat of arms of Bosnia and Herzegovina

Overview
- Established: 3 January 1997; 29 years ago
- State: Bosnia and Herzegovina
- Leader: Chairman of the Council of Ministers
- Main organ: Parliamentary Assembly of Bosnia and Herzegovina
- Ministries: 9 (2023)
- Headquarters: Greece–Bosnia and Herzegovina Friendship Building, Trg Bosne i Hercegovine 1, Sarajevo
- Website: vijeceministara.gov.ba

The Council of Ministers of Bosnia and Herzegovina (Bosnian/Croatian: Vijeće ministara Bosne i Hercegovine, Serbian: Савјет министара Босне и Херцеговине), often called Government of Bosnia and Herzegovina (Bosnian: Vlada Bosne i Hercegovine, Serbian: Влада Босне и Херцеговине), is the executive branch of the government of Bosnia and Herzegovina. It is also called the Cabinet.

According to Article V, Section 4 of the Constitution of Bosnia and Herzegovina, the Chairman of the Council of Ministers is nominated by the Presidency of Bosnia and Herzegovina and confirmed by the national House of Representatives. The Chairman then appoints other ministers.

== Decision of the Constitutional Court ==
On 11 February 1999, Mirko Banjac, at the time Deputy Chair of the House of Representatives of Bosnia and Herzegovina, instituted a request for, among other issues, the evaluation of the constitutionality of the Law on the Council of Ministers of Bosnia and Herzegovina and the Ministries of Bosnia and Herzegovina (Official Gazette of Bosnia and Herzegovina, No. 4/97) which foresaw the existence of two Co-Chairs and a Vice-Chair of the Council of Ministers. In its decision the Court had, among other things, stated the following:

Article V.4 of the Constitution of Bosnia and Herzegovina defines the Council of Ministers of Bosnia and Herzegovina, which is composed of the Chair of the Council of Ministers and a certain number of ministers as may be appropriate, who are responsible for the implementation of the policy and the decisions of Bosnia and Herzegovina from within the competencies of the institutions of Bosnia and Herzegovina; the Presidency of Bosnia and Herzegovina appoints the Chair of the Council of Ministers of Bosnia and Herzegovina, who assumes the office upon the approval by the House of Representatives of the Parliamentary Assembly of Bosnia and Herzegovina; the Chair of the Council of Ministers appoints the Minister of Foreign Affairs, the Minister of Foreign Trade and other ministers as may be appropriate (no more than two thirds of the ministers may be appointed from the territory of the Federation of Bosnia and Herzegovina), who assume the office upon the approval by the House of Representatives; also, the Chair appoints deputy ministers (who may not be from the same constituent people as their ministers), who assume the office upon the approval by the House of Representatives. It follows from what has been stated above that the challenged provisions of the law defining the Co-Chairs and the Vice-Chair of the Council of Ministers are not in accordance with the Constitution of Bosnia and Herzegovina, since the Constitution clearly establishes the traditional function of a Prime Minister designate who also appoints the ministers according to Article V.4 of the Constitution of Bosnia and Herzegovina.

The Court gave the Parliamentary Assembly of Bosnia and Herzegovina a three-month period from the date of publication of its decision in the Official Gazette of Bosnia and Herzegovina to bring the contested provisions of the Law in conformity with the Constitution of Bosnia and Herzegovina. After the Parliamentary Assembly failed to do that, the Court, acting upon the request of the applicant and pursuant to its decision of 14 August 1999 and the legal standpoint cited in the reasons of the decision, established that certain provisions of the Law on Ministers and Ministries shall cease to be valid.

== Responsibilities ==
Greece–Bosnia and Herzegovina Friendship Building, headquarters of the Council of Ministers of Bosnia and Herzegovina

The Council is responsible for carrying out the policies and decisions in the fields of:

- foreign policy
- foreign trade policy
- customs policy
- monetary policy
- finances of the institutions and for the international obligations of Bosnia and Herzegovina
- immigration, refugee, and asylum policy and regulation
- international and inter-Entity criminal law enforcement, including relations with Interpol
- establishment and operation of common and international communications facilities
- regulation of inter-Entity transportation
- air traffic control
- facilitation of inter-Entity coordination
- other matters as agreed by the Entities

== Standing Bodies of the Council of Ministers ==
- General Secretariat
- Economic Directorate
- Internal Politics Directorate
- Directorate for European Integration of Bosnia and Herzegovina
- Bureau for Legal Matters

== Current cabinet ==
The Cabinet is structured into the offices for the chairwoman of the Council of Ministers, the two vice chairs and 9 ministries.

← Krišto Cabinet → (25 January 2023 – present)
Portfolio	Minister	Party	Took office
Chairwoman of the Council of Ministers	Borjana Krišto	HDZ BiH	25 January 2023
Minister of Foreign Trade and Economic Relations; Vice Chairman of the Council of Ministers	Staša Košarac	SNSD	25 January 2023
Minister of Defence; Vice Chairman of the Council of Ministers	Zukan Helez	SDP BiH	25 January 2023
Minister of Foreign Affairs	Elmedin Konaković	NiP	25 January 2023
Minister of Finance and Treasury	Srđan Amidžić	SNSD	22 August 2023
Minister of Security	Ivica Bošnjak (acting)	HDZ BiH	23 January 2025
Minister of Justice	Davor Bunoza	Independent	25 January 2023
Minister of Civil Affairs	Dubravka Bošnjak	HDZ BiH	25 January 2023
Minister of Communications and Transport	Edin Forto	NS	25 January 2023
Minister of Human Rights and Refugees	Sevlid Hurtić	BHZ	25 January 2023

== See also ==
- Chairman of the Council of Ministers of Bosnia and Herzegovina
- Presidency of Bosnia and Herzegovina
  - List of Bosniak members of the Presidency of Bosnia and Herzegovina
  - List of Croat members of the Presidency of Bosnia and Herzegovina
  - List of Serb members of the Presidency of Bosnia and Herzegovina
  - List of members of the Presidency of Bosnia and Herzegovina by time in office
