= Cabinet of Denis Zvizdić =

Zvizdić Cabinet
- 12th Cabinet of Bosnia and Herzegovina
- 2015–2019
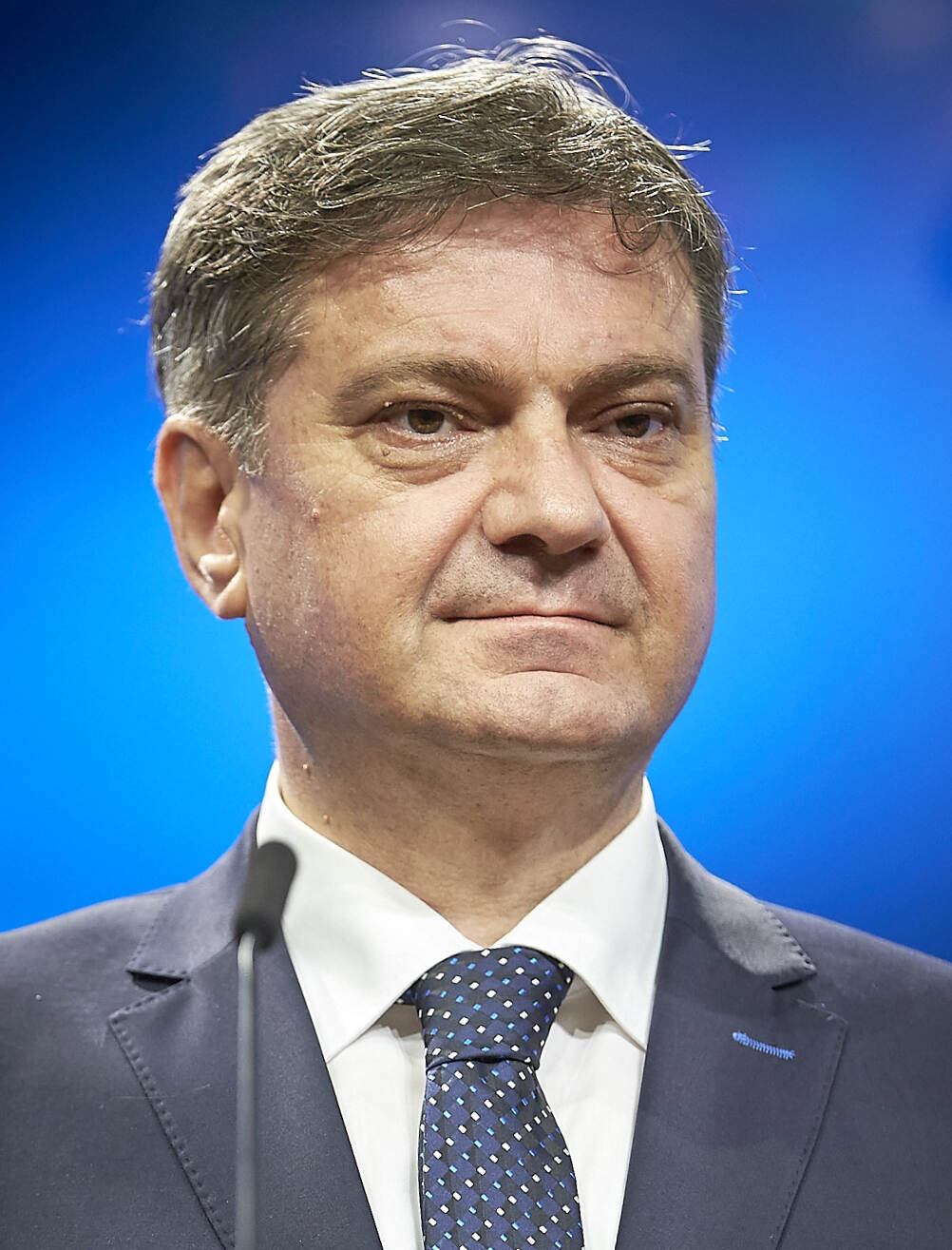
- Date formed: 31 March 2015
- Date dissolved: 23 December 2019

People and organisations
- Head of state: Presidency List: Bakir Izetbegović; Mladen Ivanić; Dragan Čović
- Head of government: Denis Zvizdić
- Deputy head of government: Vjekoslav Bevanda; Mirko Šarović
- No. of ministers: 9
- Total no. of members: 10
- Member parties: Party of Democratic Action; Croatian Democratic Union; Serb Democratic Party; Party of Democratic Progress; Union for a Better Future
- Status in legislature: Majority coalition government

History
- Election: 2014 general election
- Legislature term: 2014–2018
- Predecessor: Cabinet of Vjekoslav Bevanda
- Successor: Cabinet of Zoran Tegeltija

The Twelfth Council of Ministers of Bosnia and Herzegovina (Bosnian and Croatian: Dvanaesti saziv Vijeća ministara Bosne i Hercegovine, Serbian: Дванаести сазив Савјета министара Босне и Херцеговине / Dvanaesti saziv Savjeta ministara Bosne i Hercegovine) was the Council of Ministers of Bosnia and Herzegovina cabinet formed on 31 March 2015, following the 2014 general election. It was led by Chairman of the Council of Ministers Denis Zvizdić. The cabinet was dissolved on 23 December 2019 and was succeeded by a new Council of Ministers presided over by Zoran Tegeltija.

== Investiture ==
Investiture; Denis Zvizdić (SDA)
Ballot →	31 March 2015
Required majority →	22 out of 42
Yes	28 / 42
No	5 / 42
Abstentions	2 / 42
Absentees	7 / 42

== Party breakdown ==
Party breakdown of cabinet ministers:

- Party of Democratic Action
3
- Croatian Democratic Union
3
- Serb Democratic Party
2
- Party of Democratic Progress
1
- Union for a Better Future
1

== Cabinet members ==
The Cabinet was structured into the offices for the chairman of the Council of Ministers, the two vice chairs and 9 ministries.

← Zvizdić Cabinet → (31 March 2015 – 23 December 2019)
Portfolio	Name	Party	Took office	Left office
Chairman of the Council of Ministers	Denis Zvizdić	SDA	31 March 2015	23 December 2019
Minister of Finance and Treasury; Vice Chairman of the Council of Ministers	Vjekoslav Bevanda	HDZ BiH	31 March 2015	23 December 2019
Minister of Foreign Trade and Economic Relations; Vice Chairman of the Council of Ministers	Mirko Šarović	SDS	31 March 2015	23 December 2019
Minister of Foreign Affairs	Igor Crnadak	PDP	31 March 2015	23 December 2019
Minister of Defence	Marina Pendeš	HDZ BiH	31 March 2015	23 December 2019
Minister of Security	Dragan Mektić	SDS	31 March 2015	23 December 2019
Minister of Justice	Josip Grubeša	HDZ BiH	31 March 2015	23 December 2019
Minister of Civil Affairs	Adil Osmanović	SDA	31 March 2015	23 December 2019
Minister of Communication and Traffic	Ismir Jusko	SBB	11 May 2016	26 December 2018
Minister of Human Rights and Refugees	Semiha Borovac	SDA	31 March 2015	23 December 2019
=== Changes May 2016 ===
Portfolio	Name	Party	Took office	Left office
Minister of Communication and Traffic	Slavko Matanović	DF	31 March 2015	11 May 2016
