= Cabinet of Zoran Tegeltija =

Tegeltija Cabinet
- 13th Cabinet of Bosnia and Herzegovina
- 2019–2023
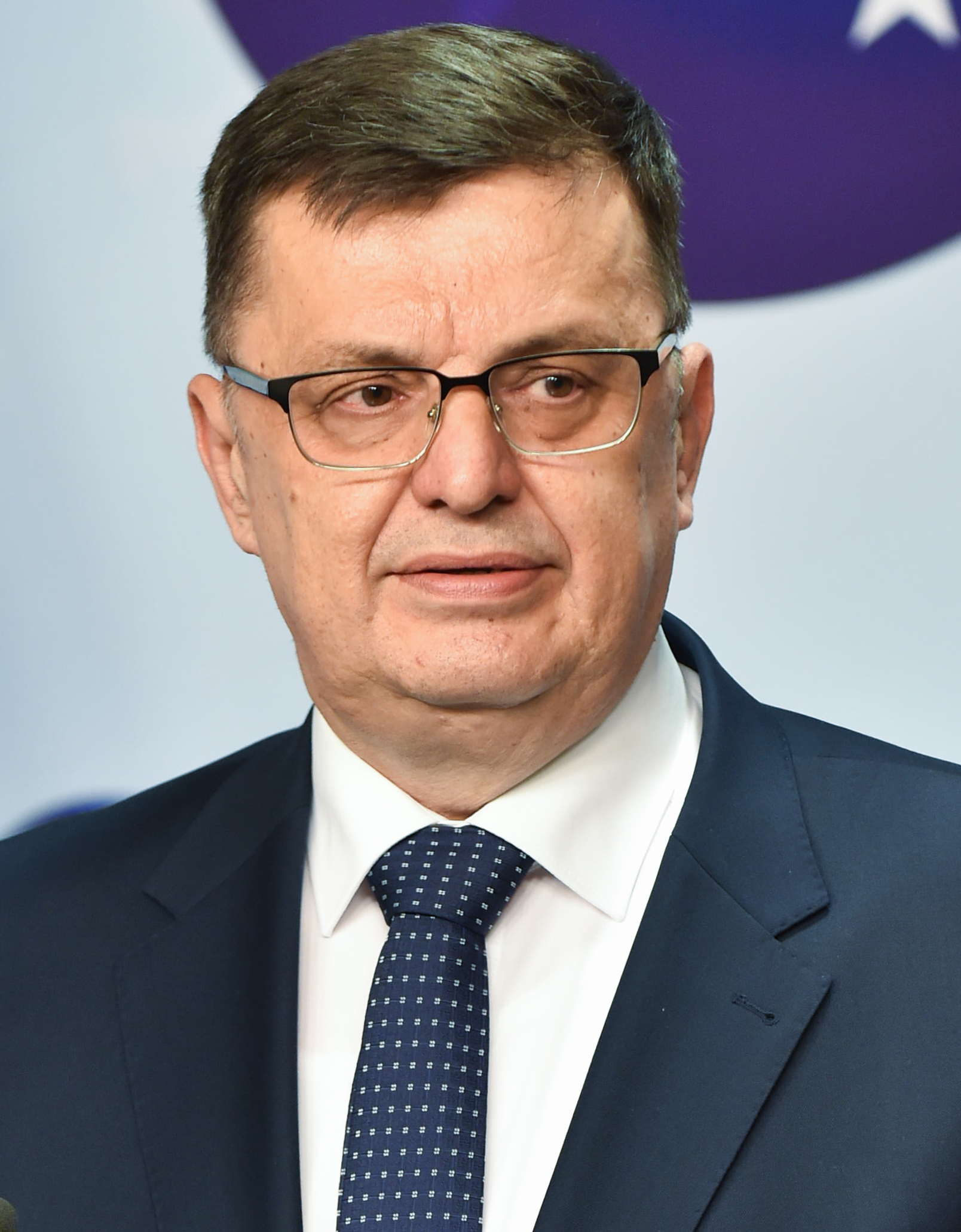
- Date formed: 23 December 2019
- Date dissolved: 25 January 2023

People and organisations
- Head of state: Presidency List: Šefik Džaferović; Milorad Dodik; Željko Komšić
- Head of government: Zoran Tegeltija
- Deputy head of government: Bisera Turković; Vjekoslav Bevanda
- No. of ministers: 9
- Total no. of members: 10
- Member parties: Alliance of Independent Social Democrats; Croatian Democratic Union; Party of Democratic Action; Democratic Front; Democratic People's Alliance
- Status in legislature: Majority coalition government

History
- Election: 2018 general election
- Legislature term: 2018–2022
- Predecessor: Cabinet of Denis Zvizdić
- Successor: Cabinet of Borjana Krišto

The Thirteenth Council of Ministers of Bosnia and Herzegovina (Bosnian and Croatian: Trinaesti saziv Vijeća ministara Bosne i Hercegovine, Serbian: Тринаести сазив Савјета министара Босне и Херцеговине / Trinaesti saziv Savjeta ministara Bosne i Hercegovine) was the Council of Ministers of Bosnia and Herzegovina cabinet formed on 23 December 2019, following the 2018 general election. It was led by Chairman of the Council of Ministers Zoran Tegeltija. The cabinet was dissolved on 25 January 2023 and was succeeded by a new Council of Ministers presided over by Borjana Krišto.

== Investiture ==
Investiture; Zoran Tegeltija (SNSD)
Ballot →	23 December 2019
Required majority →	22 out of 42
Yes	29 / 42
No	8 / 42
Abstentions	1 / 42
Absentees	4 / 42

== History ==
After a one year governmental formation crisis following the 2018 general election, on 5 December 2019, the national House of Representatives confirmed the appointment of Zoran Tegeltija as the new Chairman of the Council of Ministers of Bosnia and Herzegovina. The whole government was confirmed by Parliament on 23 December 2019.

At a national House of Representatives session held on 11 January 2021, a vote of no confidence in Tegeltija took place, due to poor performance results during his term as Chairman of the Council of Ministers, but by the end of the voting, it was clear that Tegeltija was staying as Chairman of the Council of Ministers. Three months later, on 28 April, another vote of no confidence in Tegeltija took place at a House of Representatives session, but again, Tegeltija continued serving as Chairman.

The cabinet was dissolved on 25 January 2023, following the appointment of a new cabinet headed by Borjana Krišto.

=== Cabinet reshuffle ===
During the period from December 2019 until May 2020, the office of Minister of Human Rights and Refugees was vacant, with the leading parties in government not finding common ground on naming a new minister; eventually, DNS's Miloš Lučić was decided to take on the role of minister, getting confirmed by Parliament on 15 May 2020. Less than a month after Lučić's appointment, on 2 June 2020, Fahrudin Radončić resigned as Minister of Security over a migration dispute with other members of Tegeltija's government; Radončić proposed the deportation of 9,000 migrants which the cabinet, headed by Tegeltija, voted against. On 23 July 2020, Selmo Cikotić became the new Minister of Security in Tegeltija's cabinet, succeeding Radončić.

In February 2021, Josip Grubeša, the Minister of Justice in the government of Tegeltija, was almost released from his duties as minister after the House of Representatives was on verge of voting for his dismissal, but just narrowly, voted against.

On 12 March 2021, Tegeltija dismissed Miloš Lučić from his duties as Minister of Human Rights and Refugees, the reason being the abolishment of the coalition between Tegeltija's SNSD party and Lučić's DNS. Eighteen days later, on 30 March, the House of Representatives confirmed Lučić's dismissal, but the decision officially never took effect because the national House of Peoples, the upper house of the bicameral Parliamentary Assembly of Bosnia and Herzegovina, never confirmed the dismissal.

In October 2021, the Minister of Defence in Tegeltija's cabinet, Sifet Podžić, canceled a military exercise between the Serbian Army and the Armed Forces of Bosnia and Herzegovina due to the "bad epidemiological situation in the country and because of the small number of vaccinated members of the Armed Forces." This was met with outrage by Tegeltija, who sent a request for the removal of Podžić as minister to the national Parliament. Some days later, he submitted the decision on the dismissal of Podžić to the House of Representatives. On 26 October, the majority of the House of Representatives members voted against Tegeltija's decision and did not support Podžić's dismissal.

== Party breakdown ==
Party breakdown of cabinet ministers:

- Alliance of Independent Social Democrats
3
- Croatian Democratic Union
3
- Party of Democratic Action
2
- Democratic Front
1
- Democratic People's Alliance
1

== Cabinet members ==
The Cabinet is structured into the offices for the chairman of the Council of Ministers, the two vice chairs and 9 ministries.

← Tegeltija Cabinet → (23 December 2019 – 25 January 2023)
Portfolio	Name	Party	Took office	Left office
Chairman of the Council of Ministers	Zoran Tegeltija	SNSD	23 December 2019	25 January 2023
Minister of Foreign Affairs; Vice Chairwoman of the Council of Ministers	Bisera Turković	SDA	23 December 2019	25 January 2023
Minister of Finance and Treasury; Vice Chairman of the Council of Ministers	Vjekoslav Bevanda	HDZ BiH	23 December 2019	25 January 2023
Minister of Foreign Trade and Economic Relations	Staša Košarac	SNSD	23 December 2019	25 January 2023
Minister of Defence	Sifet Podžić	DF	23 December 2019	25 January 2023
Minister of Security	Selmo Cikotić	SDA	23 July 2020	25 January 2023
Minister of Justice	Josip Grubeša	HDZ BiH	23 December 2019	25 January 2023
Minister of Civil Affairs	Ankica Gudeljević	HDZ BiH	23 December 2019	25 January 2023
Minister of Communication and Traffic	Vojin Mitrović	SNSD	23 December 2019	23 December 2022
Minister of Human Rights and Refugees	Miloš Lučić	DNS	15 May 2020	12 December 2022
=== Changes June 2020 ===
Portfolio	Name	Party	Took office	Left office
Minister of Security	Fahrudin Radončić	SBB	23 December 2019	2 June 2020
