= Selmo Cikotić =

Bosnian politician (born 1964)

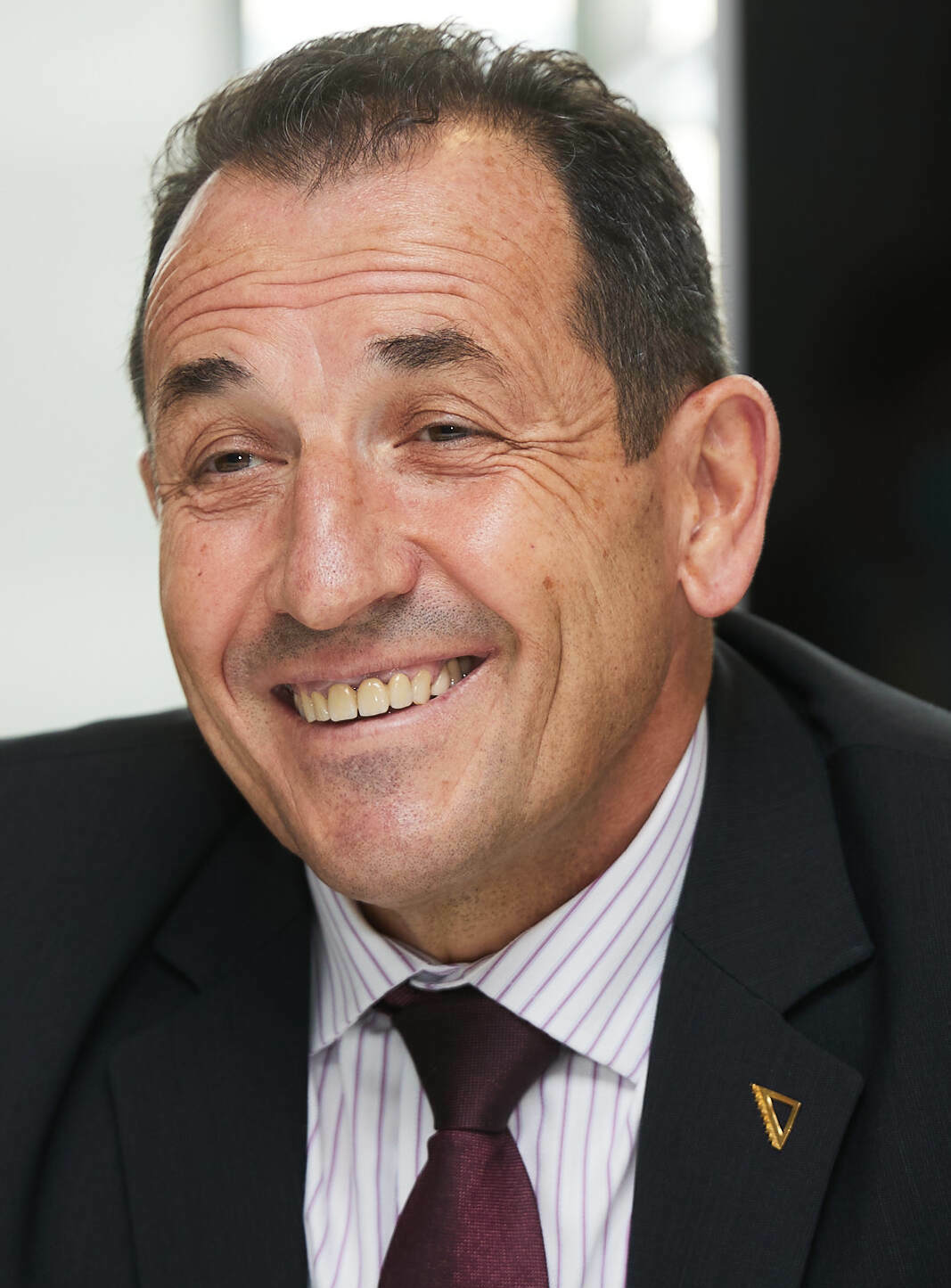
- Cikotić in 2021

Minister of Security
- In office 23 July 2020 – 25 January 2023
- Prime Minister: Zoran Tegeltija
- Preceded by: Fahrudin Radončić
- Succeeded by: Nenad Nešić

Minister of Defence
- In office 22 April 2007 – 12 January 2012
- Prime Minister: Nikola Špirić
- Preceded by: Nikola Radovanović
- Succeeded by: Muhamed Ibrahimović

Personal details
- Born: 25 January 1964 (age 62) Berane, SR Montenegro, SFR Yugoslavia
- Party: Party of Democratic Action
- Education: University of Sarajevo

Military service
- Allegiance: Yugoslavia (1984–92); Republic of Bosnia and Herzegovina (1992–95); Federation of Bosnia and Herzegovina (1995–04)
- Branch/service: JNA (1984–92); ARBiH (1992–95); VFBiH (1995–04)
- Years of service: 1984–2004
- Rank: Brigadier
- Commands: Operational group Zapad; 1st Corps of the Federal Army
- Battles/wars: Bosnian War

Selmo Cikotić (born 25 January 1964) is a Bosnian politician who served as Minister of Security from 2020 to 2023. He was also the Minister of Defence from 2007 to 2012. He is currently serving a three-year prison sentence for corruption in Vojkovići prison.

A member of the Party of Democratic Action, Cikotić's career in the army spanned for 20 years, being in the Yugoslav People's Army, the Army of the Republic of Bosnia and Herzegovina during the Bosnian War, and lastly in the Army of the Federation of Bosnia and Herzegovina. He was ranked as brigadier.

== Early career ==
In February 1993, Cikotić was made commander of operational group Zapad of the 3rd Corps of the Army of the Republic of Bosnia and Herzegovina in Bugojno.

He served as the military attaché at the embassy of Bosnia and Herzegovina to the United States in Washington, D.C. from December 1994 to 1997. As brigadier general, Cikotić was enrolled at the United States Army Command and General Staff College at Fort Leavenworth in June 1997, before being expelled as a result of unconfirmed accusations made by Croatian officials that he commanded soldiers who tortured and killed people in and around Bugojno during the Bosnian War.

From 2000 until 2004, he was the Commander of the 1st Corps of the Federal Army, and from 2004 to 2007 CEO of OKI in Sarajevo. Cikotić has a master's degree from the University of Sarajevo in 2004 and is fluent in English.

== Minister of Defence (2007–2012) ==
Cikotić was appointed Minister of Defence on 11 January 2007, but was unable to take up officially until 22 April 2007, when a ban on former army officers performing defence-related civilian duties expired.

In June 2007, he jointly attended a Euro-Atlantic Partnership Council at the NATO headquarters in Brussels with Serbian Defence Minister Dragan Šutanovac, where together they expressed their governments' wish to join NATO as soon as possible. In March 2008, Cikotić led a five member delegation to Pakistan, to discuss "bilateral cooperation between the two Muslim countries". His term as Minister of Defence ended on 12 January 2012.

== Minister of Security (2020–2023) ==
On 23 July 2020, Cikotić became Minister of Security in the government of Zoran Tegeltija. This came after Fahrudin Radončić resigned as Minister of Security over a migration dispute with other members of Zoran Tegeltija's government; Radončić proposed the deportation of 9,000 migrants which the cabinet, headed by Tegeltija, voted against.

On 25 November 2021, the Prosecutor's Office of Bosnia and Herzegovina filed an indictment against Cikotić for high corruption, regarding abuse of position and authority at the time when he was Defence Minister. The national Court confirmed the indictment against Cikotić on 8 December 2021, accusing him of abusing his position as Defence Minister from 2009 until 2011, which damaged the budget of Bosnia and Herzegovina by 9.7 million KM and obtained multimillion-dollar property gain for others. The indictment was confirmed and Cikotić was sentenced to three years in prison in October 2024.

Cikotić was succeeded as Minister of Security by Nenad Nešić on 25 January 2023, following the formation of a new government presided over by Borjana Krišto.

== War crimes charges ==
On 18 January 2024, an indictment against Cikotić was confirmed by the Bosnian state court. He was charged with failing to take whatever actions necessary to prevent the ill-treatment, torture and murders of captured Croatian Defence Council soldiers in 1993, as well as failing to initiate criminal proceedings against those who had committed the concerned war crimes in the town of Bugojno during the Croat–Bosniak conflict.

== Personal life ==
On 17 October 2020, it was confirmed that Cikotić tested positive for COVID-19, amid its pandemic in Bosnia and Herzegovina.

Political offices
Preceded by Nikola Radovanović	Minister of Defence; 2007–2012	Succeeded by Muhamed Ibrahimović
Preceded by Fahrudin Radončić	Minister of Security; 2020–2023	Succeeded by Nenad Nešić
