= Fahrudin Radončić =

Bosnian businessman and politician (born 1957)

Minister of Security
- In office 23 December 2019 – 2 June 2020
- Prime Minister: Zoran Tegeltija
- Preceded by: Dragan Mektić
- Succeeded by: Selmo Cikotić
- In office 22 November 2012 – 29 April 2014
- Prime Minister: Vjekoslav Bevanda
- Preceded by: Sadik Ahmetović
- Succeeded by: Mladen Ćavar (acting)

President of the Union for a Better Future
- Incumbent
- Assumed office 30 October 2009
- Preceded by: Office established
Parliamentary offices
Member of the House of Peoples
In office
16 February 2015 – 28 February 2019

Personal details
- Born: 24 May 1957 (age 69) Berane, PR Montenegro, FPR Yugoslavia
- Party: Union for a Better Future (2009–present)
- Spouse(s): Snježana Rakonjac (until 1994) Azra Bučan (m. 1994; div. 2012)
- Children: 3
- Education: University of Montenegro
- Occupation: Media magnate, entrepreneur, investor, politician
- Profession: Journalist, editor

Military service
- Allegiance: Republic of Bosnia and Herzegovina
- Branch/service: ARBiH (1992–95)
- Years of service: 1992–1995
- Rank: Soldier
- Battles/wars: Bosnian War; Siege of Sarajevo

Fahrudin Radončić (born 24 May 1957) is a Bosnian businessman and politician who served as Minister of Security from 2012 to 2014 and again from 2019 to 2020. He is the founder of Dnevni avaz, the best-selling newspaper in Bosnia and Herzegovina and is the founder and current president of the Union for a Better Future.

From 2015 to 2019, Radončić was also a member of the national House of Peoples. He is regarded as one of the wealthiest politicians in Bosnia and Herzegovina.

== Early life and career ==
Born on 24 May 1957 in Ivangrad, PR Montenegro, FPR Yugoslavia, Radončić finished elementary and high school in Titograd, modern-day Podgorica. He graduated from the University of Montenegro in Nikšić. He started working in journalism at 19, and at 23 he was editor of the Republican Youth Magazine "Youth Movement in Podgorica". In the same period he got involved in politics as a member of the League of Communists of Montenegro, serving as executive secretary of the Republican Organization of the Union of Communists in Titograd until 1988. He has stated that his mother is of Albanian origin.

From 1989 until the beginning of the Bosnian War in 1992, Radončić worked as a commentator and correspondent for Montenegro's Danas weekly. In 1990, he published the book "10,000 Days of Slavery", a biography of Adem Demaçi, an Albanian who spent 28 years in the prisons of Yugoslavia while fighting for Kosovo's independence.

The same year Radončić moved from Podgorica to Sarajevo where he founded the publishing house Avaz in 1991.

In 1992, at the start of the war, Radončić joined the Army of the Republic of Bosnia and Herzegovina (ARBiH), serving for a year as member of the cabinet of General Sefer Halilović, Chief of Staff of the ARBiH Supreme Command.

== Business career ==
In October 1993, while living in besieged Sarajevo, Radončić launched the weekly publication Bošnjački avaz (English: Bosniak voice). The first texts published in this magazine, dated 15 November 1993, were strongly opposed to the division of Bosnia and Herzegovina". In October 1995, through his publishing company, he launched Dnevni avaz (English: Daily voice).

In 2000, Radončić constructed the first Avaz building (today Addiko Bank building in Sarajevo), in 2004 the Radon Plaza Hotel, and in 2007 he won the largest public acknowledgement award for contribution to the reconstruction of Sarajevo Canton. In 2006, the construction of the Avaz Twist Tower began, the highest building in Bosnia and Herzegovina and in the Balkans. It was completed in a record two years. In 2012, his company built the largest business centre in Tuzla.

== Political career ==
Radončić founded his own political party in September 2009, the Union for a Better Future, as a centre-right Bosniak party. In the 2010 general election, he ran for a seat in the Presidency of Bosnia and Herzegovina as a Bosniak member, but was not elected, obtaining 30.49% of the vote, with Bakir Izetbegović of the Party of Democratic Action (SDA) getting elected with 34.86% of the vote. Following the election and a one-year governmental formation crisis, Radončić served as Minister of Security from 22 November 2012 until 29 April 2014 in the Vjekoslav Bevanda cabinet. He was sacked as minister in March 2014, after riots across several cities in Bosnia and Herzegovina during the February 2014 unrest.

Radončić ran for the Presidency for a second time in the 2014 general election, but once again failed to get elected, winning 26.78% compared to Izetbegović's 32.87%. Following the election, he became a member of the national House of Peoples, serving until February 2019.

In the 2018 general election, Radončić decided for a third run at the Presidency spot. However, he failed to achieve his two previous results, winning only 12.95% of the vote, while SDA candidate Šefik Džaferović won with 36.61% and Social Democratic Party member Denis Bećirović earning 33.53% of the vote.

After another year-long government formation, Radončić was appointed as Minister of Security in the Zoran Tegeltija cabinet on 23 December 2019. On 2 June 2020, he resigned as minister over a migration dispute with other members of Tegeltija's government; Radončić proposed the deportation of 9,000 migrants which the cabinet voted against.

== Legal issues ==
On charges of pressuring a witness in the trial of drug trafficker and mafia boss Naser Kelmendi, who was involved in the murder of Ramiz Delalić, Radončić was arrested in Sarajevo on 26 January 2016. The Court of Bosnia and Herzegovina detained him for one month. Radončić was ultimately acquitted of all charges on 16 May 2018.

== Personal life ==
Radončić's first wife is Montenegrin journalist Snježana Rakonjac, with whom he had a son. In 1994, Radončić married Azra Bučan, with whom he had two sons. In May 2012, they divorced.

== Works ==
- Adem Demaçi. Deset tisuća dana robije (Confession. One Thousand Days of Imprisonment), Danas Verlag, Zagreb 1990.
- Bosna će opstati (Bosnia will survive), Danas Verlag, Zagreb 1991.
- Goodbye, Bosnia, Danas Verlag, Zagreb 1991.

Political offices
Preceded by Sadik Ahmetović	Minister of Security; 2012–2014	Succeeded by Mladen Ćavar (Acting)
Preceded by Dragan Mektić	Minister of Security; 2019–2020	Succeeded by Selmo Cikotić
