= Nenad Nešić =

Bosnian Serb politician (born 1978)

- Ненад Нешић
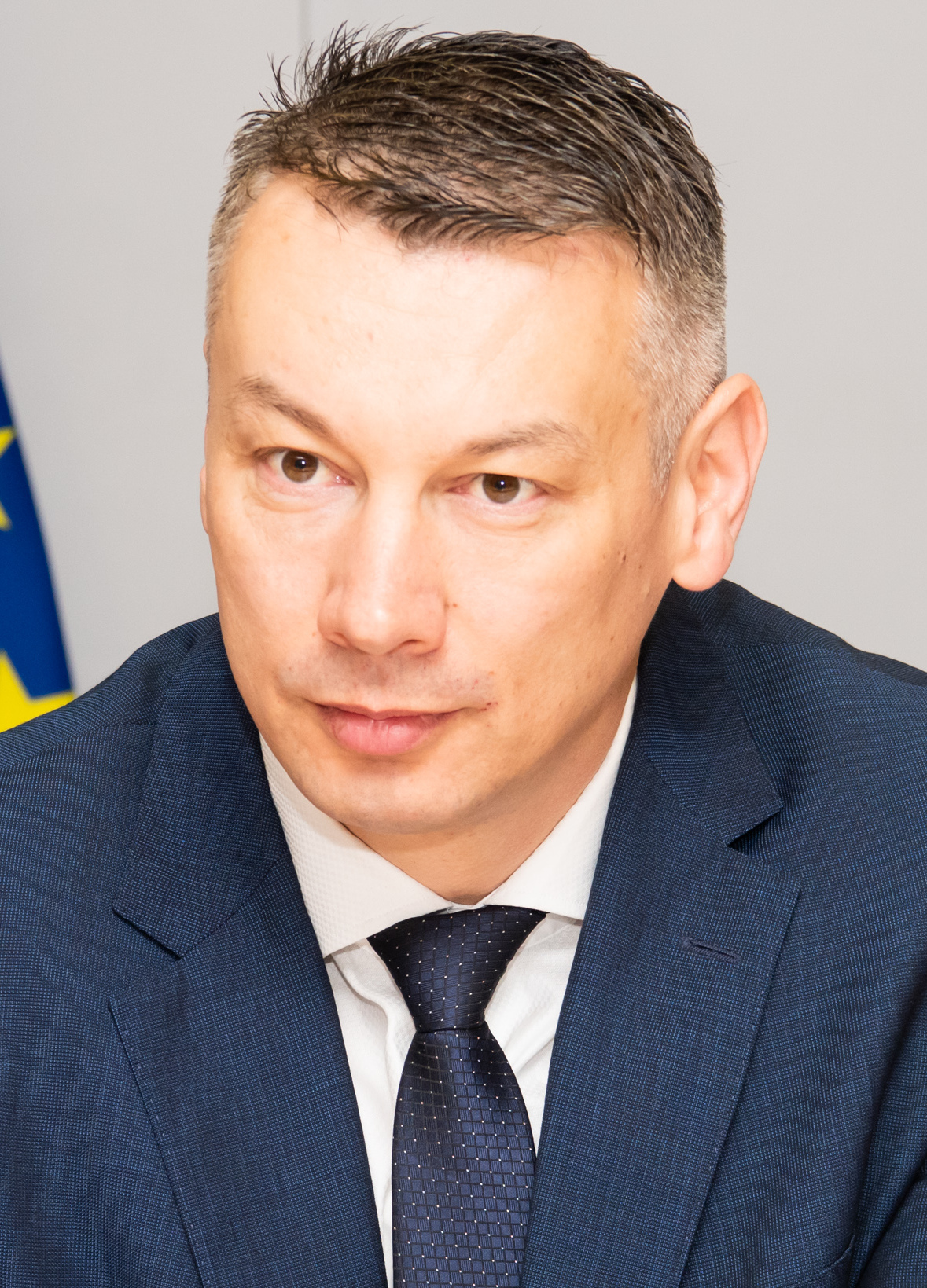
- Nešić in 2023

Minister of Security
- In office 25 January 2023 – 23 January 2025
- Prime Minister: Borjana Krišto
- Preceded by: Selmo Cikotić
- Succeeded by: Ivica Bošnjak (acting)
Parliamentary offices
Member of the House of Representatives
In office
6 December 2018 – 1 December 2022

Personal details
- Born: 4 July 1978 (age 48) Sarajevo, SR Bosnia and Herzegovina, SFR Yugoslavia
- Party: Democratic People's Alliance (2014–present)
- Spouse: Maja Nešić
- Children: 2
- Education: University of Novi Sad (LLB)

Nenad Nešić (Serbian Cyrillic: Ненад Нешић; born 4 July 1978) is a Bosnian Serb politician who served as Minister of Security from 2023 to 2025. He previously served as member of the House of Representatives from 2018 to 2022. He is president of the Democratic People's Alliance since 2020.

== Early life and education ==
Nešić was born on 4 July 1978 in Sarajevo. He graduated from the University of Novi Sad Faculty of Law in 2005, and worked in the Ministry of Interior of Republika Srpska until 2014.

== Political career ==
A member of the Democratic People's Alliance (DNS), Nešić was the acting director of the state-owned company Putevi Republike Srpske from 2016 to 2020. In the 2018 Bosnian general election, he was elected member of the national House of Representatives. Nešić was elected president of DNS in 2020, succeeding Marko Pavić. Under his leadership, the DNS left the ruling SNSD-led coalition in Republika Srpska and became an opposition party.

On 2 March 2022, Nešić announced his candidacy in the Bosnian general election, running for Bosnia and Herzegovina's three-person Presidency member, representing the Serbs. In the general election however, held on 2 October 2022, he was not elected, obtaining only 5.51% of the vote.

On 25 January 2023, following the formation of a new Council of Ministers presided over by Borjana Krišto, Nešić was appointed as the new Minister of Security within Krišto's government. Following his indictment on charges of corruption in December 2024, Nešić announced he was to resign as minister on 23 January 2025.

== Legal issues ==
Nešić was arrested on 26 December 2024, and later indicted, as a suspect of conspiracy to commit criminal offenses, money laundering, abuse of official position or authority and accepting bribes. He is also accused of having received a bribe of 250,000 KM in 2019 while serving as director of Putevi Republike Srpske.

He spent around five months in detention at the State Prison in Vojkovići, after which he was released in May 2025 upon posting bail and is defending himself while free.

== Personal life ==
Nešić is married to Maja Nešić, also a member of the Democratic People's Alliance, with whom he has two children. They live in Istočno Sarajevo.

Political offices
| Preceded by Selmo Cikotić | Minister of Security; 2023–205 | Succeeded by Ivica Bošnjak (Acting) |
