= Bunoza =

Bunoza is a surname. Notable people with the surname include:

- Davor Bunoza (born 1980), Bosnian politician
- Gordan Bunoza (born 1988), Bosnian footballer
