= 5th electoral unit of the National Assembly of Republika Srpska =

Parliamentary constituency

5th electoral unit
- National Assembly of Republika Srpska constituency
- Electoral unit within Republika Srpska

Current constituency
- Created: 2014
- Seats: 6

The fifth electoral unit of Republika Srpska is a parliamentary constituency used to elect members to the National Assembly of Republika Srpska since 2014. It consists of the Municipalities of Stanari, Doboj, Petrovo and Teslić.

== Demographics ==
| Ethnicity | Population | % |
|---|---|---|
| Bosniaks | 22,513 | 19.3 |
| Croats | 3,323 | 2.9 |
| Serbs | 8,040 | 75.6 |
| Did Not declare | 864 | 0.7 |
| Others | 1,492 | 1.3 |
| Unknown | 219 | 0.2 |
| Total | 116,451 | |

== Representatives ==
| Convocation | Deputies | | | | | |
|---|---|---|---|---|---|---|
| 2014-2018 | Goran Jerinić (SNSD) | Dragan Bogdanić (SNSD) | Boris Jerinić (SDS) | Nikola Gavrić (SDS) | Adil Osmanović (SDA) | Slavko Gligorić; DNS) |
| 2018-2022 | Goran Jerinić (SNSD) | Aleksandar Subotić (SNSD) | Nebojša Marić (SDS) | Danijel Jošić (SDS/ SNSD) | Srđan Todorović (PS) | Slavko Gligorić; DNS) |
| 2022-2026 | Nina Bukejlović (SNSD) | Aleksandar Subotić (SNSD) | Milan Kasapović (SDS) | Danijel Jošić (SDS/ SNSD) | Srđan Todorović (PS) | Sevlid Hurtić (BHZ) |
| 2026-2030 | Nina Bukejlović (SNSD) | Radoslav Nikolić (SNSD) | Stojan Smiljanić (SDS) | Danijel Jošić (SDS/ SNSD) | Boris Šljivić (PS) | Sevlid Hurtić (BHZ) |
