= Dragan Mektić =

Bosnian Serb politician and criminal investigator (born 1956)

- Драган Мектић
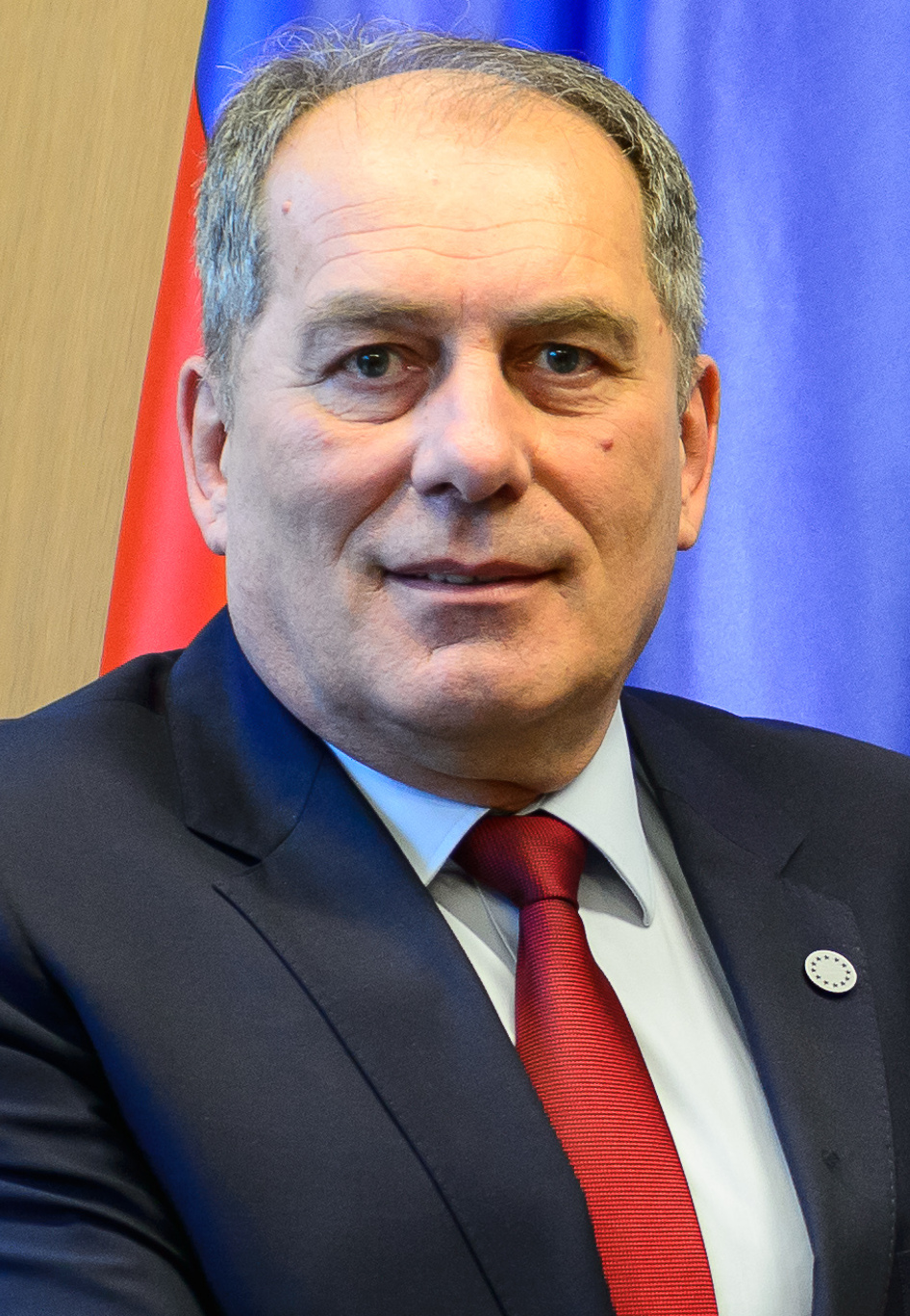
- Mektić in 2016

Minister of Security
- In office 31 March 2015 – 23 December 2019
- Prime Minister: Denis Zvizdić
- Preceded by: Mladen Ćavar (acting)
- Succeeded by: Fahrudin Radončić
Parliamentary offices
Member of the House of Representatives
In office 23 December 2019 – 1 December 2022
Constituency	1st Electoral Unit RS

Personal details
- Born: 24 December 1956 (age 69) Prnjavor, PR Bosnia and Herzegovina, FPR Yugoslavia
- Party: Serb Democratic Party
- Spouse: Veselinka Mektić
- Children: 2
- Education: University of Zagreb (BCJ)

Dragan Mektić (Serbian Cyrillic: Драган Мектић; born 24 December 1956) is a Bosnian Serb politician and former criminal investigator who served as Minister of Security from 2015 to 2019. He was also a member of the national House of Representatives from 2019 to 2022.

Mektić is a member of the Serb Democratic Party.

== Biography ==
Mektić graduated from an engineering-orientated vocational high school in the Bosnian city of Banja Luka. Following his graduation, he enrolled and completed a higher administrative school, and eventually warner a degree in Criminal justice from the University of Zagreb.

From 1980 until 1997, Mektić directed a police station, where he was engaged in suppressing general and financial crime. Then, from 1997 to 2003, he was employed in the intelligence sector of Bosnia and Herzegovina. From 2002 to 2007, he was deputy of the then security minister Bariša Čolak, followed by nine years, from 2006 until 2015, as director of the Service for Foreigners' Affairs of Bosnia and Herzegovina.

On 31 March 2015, Mektić was appointed Minister of Security as part of the government led by Denis Zvizdić. His term as Minister ended on 23 December 2019.

Mektić later became a member of the national House of Representatives.

== Public persona ==
Mektić is generally considered to be a popular figure, not just in a political, but in a social spectrum as well. He has attracted the media's attention numerous times for his occasionally over-exaggerative and satirical impressions of the current situation in Bosnia and Herzegovina as a whole and was often being credited as "the voice of reason" among the nation's politicians. His popularity primarily revolves around his open opposition and often harsh criticism directed to the Bosnian Serb political leader Milorad Dodik.

On one instance, in November 2019, Mektić had ripped apart his Army of Republika Srpska veteran-membership booklet on live TV in protest to the government of Republika Srpska.

Mektić would go on to display his personality on live-TV once again. In an informal interview, He had talked about his childhood in Prnjavor, discussing his parents and their attitudes. He was quoted as saying:

"In some cases, my father would beat the hell out of me; I often hid on top a beech tree for hours at the time."

In July 2020, Mektić, who maintains an active Twitter account, published a video of himself organizing a foam party in the river Ukrina near his hometown of Prnjavor. The video soon became viral, however, as a result, he became a subject of an investigation conducted by the Ministry of Environment and Forestry of Republika Srpska.

Political offices
Preceded by Mladen Ćavar (Acting)	Minister of Security; 2015–2019	Succeeded by Fahrudin Radončić
