= Kasindo =

Coordinates: 43.79556°N 18.39028°E

Kasindo Касиндо
- Neighbourhood
- Interactive map of Kasindo
- Country: Bosnia and Herzegovina
- Entity: Republika Srpska
- Municipality: Istočna Ilidža
- Time zone: UTC+1 (CET)
  - Summer (DST): UTC+2 (CEST)

Kasindo (Serbian Cyrillic: Касиндо) is a neighbourhood in the city of Istočno Sarajevo in Istočna Ilidža municipality, Republika Srpska, Bosnia and Herzegovina. Kasindo is also the old name for this municipality. The clinical center of Istočno Sarajevo is in this part of the city.
