= Miloš Lučić =

Bosnian Serb politician (born 1986)

Minister of Human Rights and Refugees
- In office 15 May 2020 – 12 December 2022
- Prime Minister: Zoran Tegeltija
- Preceded by: Semiha Borovac
- Succeeded by: Sevlid Hurtić

Personal details
- Born: 19 November 1986 (age 39) Sarajevo, SR Bosnia and Herzegovina, SFR Yugoslavia
- Party: Democratic People's Alliance
- Education: University of East Sarajevo

Miloš Lučić (born 19 November 1986) is a Bosnian Serb politician who served as Minister of Human Rights and Refugees from 2020 to 2022. He is a member of the Democratic People's Alliance.

== Biography ==
Lučić was born in Sarajevo, SFR Yugoslavia, present-day Bosnia and Herzegovina on 19 November 1986. He graduated from the Faculty of Economics at the University of East Sarajevo.

On 15 May 2020, Lučić was appointed Minister of Human Rights and Refugees in the cabinet of Zoran Tegeltija, representing the Democratic People's Alliance (DNS). On 12 March 2021, Zoran Tegeltija dismissed Lučić from his duty as minister, the reason being the abolishment of the coalition between Tegeltija's SNSD party and Lučić's DNS. Eighteen days later, on 30 March, the national House of Representatives confirmed Lučić's dismissal, but the decision officially never took effect because the national House of Peoples, the upper house of the bicameral Parliamentary Assembly, never confirmed the dismissal. He resigned from office on 12 December 2022.

== Controversies ==
Lučić's appointment as Minister of Human Rights and Refugees was heavily criticized by the opposition, who emphasized on the fact that it took Lučić five years to complete a four-year high school and that it took him twelve years to finish University. Lučić defended himself, saying he attended high school for five years due to him "having problems with one of the professors". He also explained why his studies took longer, claiming he "focused on a banking career, but had later gone to Banja Luka."

On 6 December 2022, the State Investigation and Protection Agency (SIPA) arrested Lučić on suspicion of abuse of office during his term as minister. He was released from prison on 9 December and was put under house arrest. Lučić later resigned as a government minister on 12 December.

Political offices
Preceded by Semiha Borovac	Minister of Human Rights and Refugees; 2020–2022	Succeeded by Sevlid Hurtić
