= Ministry of Justice (Bosnia and Herzegovina) =

Government ministry of Bosnia and Herzegovina

Ministry of Justice of Bosnia and Herzegovina
- Ministarstvo pravde Bosne i Hercegovine; Министарство правде Босне и Херцеговине

- Greece–Bosnia and Herzegovina Friendship Building, seat of the Ministry of Justice of Bosnia and Herzegovina

Department overview
- Formed: 2002
- Headquarters: Sarajevo
- Minister responsible: Davor Bunoza
- Website: http://mpr.gov.ba/

The Ministry of Justice of Bosnia and Herzegovina (Serbo-Croatian: Ministarstvo pravde Bosne i Hercegovine / Министарство правде Босне и Херцеговине) is the governmental department which oversees the judiciary body of Bosnia and Herzegovina.

== History ==
Following the independence of Bosnia and Herzegovina in 1992, the Ministry of Justice of the Republic of Bosnia and Herzegovina began to operate from the Socialist Federal Republic of Yugoslavia (SFRY) at the level of the newly established Republic of Bosnia and Herzegovina. After the end of the Bosnian War, and the signing of the Dayton Agreement, the Ministry of Justice of the Federation of Bosnia and Herzegovina and the Ministry of Justice of the Republika Srpska started functioning for the judiciary in Bosnia and Herzegovina.

By 2008, the entity Ministries of Justice were responsible for the jurisdiction of the judiciary in Bosnia and Herzegovina. Following the 2006 Bosnian general election and the formation of a new government in Bosnia and Herzegovina, the Ministry of Justice of Bosnia and Herzegovina began functioning for the judiciary in Bosnia and Herzegovina.

== Responsibilities ==
The Ministry of Justice has the authority to administer the following judicial institutions at the level of Bosnia and Herzegovina:

- Court Police of Bosnia and Herzegovina
- Court of Bosnia and Herzegovina
- Constitutional Court of Bosnia and Herzegovina
- Prosecutor's Office of Bosnia and Herzegovina

== List of ministers ==
=== Ministers of Justice of Bosnia and Herzegovina (2002–present) ===
Political parties:
Serb Democratic Party (SDS)
Croatian Democratic Union (HDZ BiH)

No.	Portrait	Minister of Defence	Took office	Left office	Time in office	Party
1	Slobodan Kovač	Slobodan Kovač (1936–2017)	23 December 2002	11 January 2007	4 years, 19 days	SDS
2	Bariša Čolak	Bariša Čolak (born 1956)	11 January 2007	31 March 2015	8 years, 79 days	HDZ BiH
3	Josip Grubeša	Josip Grubeša (born 1978)	31 March 2015	25 January 2023	7 years, 300 days	HDZ BiH
4	Davor Bunoza	Davor Bunoza (born 1980)	25 January 2023	Incumbent	3 years, 196 days	Independent

Source: Rulers.org

== See also ==
- Ministry of Justice
- Justice minister
- Politics of Bosnia and Herzegovina
