= Semiha Borovac =

Bosnian lawyer and politician (born 1955)

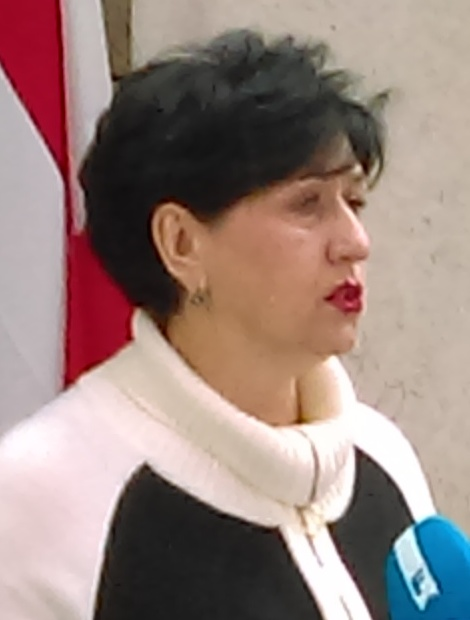
- Borovac in 2018

Minister of Human Rights and Refugees
- In office 31 March 2015 – 23 December 2019
- Prime Minister: Denis Zvizdić
- Preceded by: Damir Ljubić
- Succeeded by: Miloš Lučić

35th Mayor of Sarajevo
- In office 16 April 2005 – 28 January 2009
- Preceded by: Muhidin Hamamdžić
- Succeeded by: Alija Behmen

Personal details
- Born: 2 March 1955 (age 71) Sarajevo, SR Bosnia and Herzegovina, SFR Yugoslavia
- Party: Party of Democratic Action (1992–present)
- Spouse: Miralem Borovac
- Children: 2
- Education: University of Sarajevo (LLB)

Semiha Borovac (born 2 March 1955) is a Bosnian lawyer and politician who served as the 35th mayor of Sarajevo from 2005 to 2009. She was Sarajevo's first female mayor.

Borovac was also Minister of Human Rights and Refugees from 2015 to 2019. She is a member of the Party of Democratic Action.

== Education ==
Borovac attended first the "Ahmet Fetahagić" elementary school and then the "Druga Gimnazija" secondary school in Sarajevo. She went on to university, graduating from the Sarajevo Law School in 1977 and qualifying as a judge in 2000. In 2001, she also qualified as a trainer with the Citizens' Association for Local Development Initiative.

== Political career ==
Borovac served as the 35th mayor of Sarajevo from 16 April 2005 until 28 January 2009; she was the first female to serve as mayor.

Borovac became the new Minister of Human Rights and Refugees on 31 March 2015 in the government of Denis Zvizdić. Within her first year in office, Borovac met with refugee families across Bosnia and Herzegovina. On 26 January 2016, Borovac signed an agreement with mayors from cities throughout the country and ministers of both entities, promising to have 438 homes built for families displaced by the Bosnian War of the 1990s. Her term as Minister ended on 23 December 2019.

== Personal life ==
Semiha is married to Miralem Borovac and together they have two daughters.

Political offices
Preceded by Muhidin Hamamdžić	Mayor of Sarajevo; 2005–2009	Succeeded by Alija Behmen
Preceded by Damir Ljubić	Minister of Human Rights and Refugees; 2015–2019	Succeeded by Miloš Lučić
