= Istočna Ilidža =

Municipality in Bosnia and Herzegovina

Istočna Ilidža Источна Илиџа East Ilidža
- Municipality
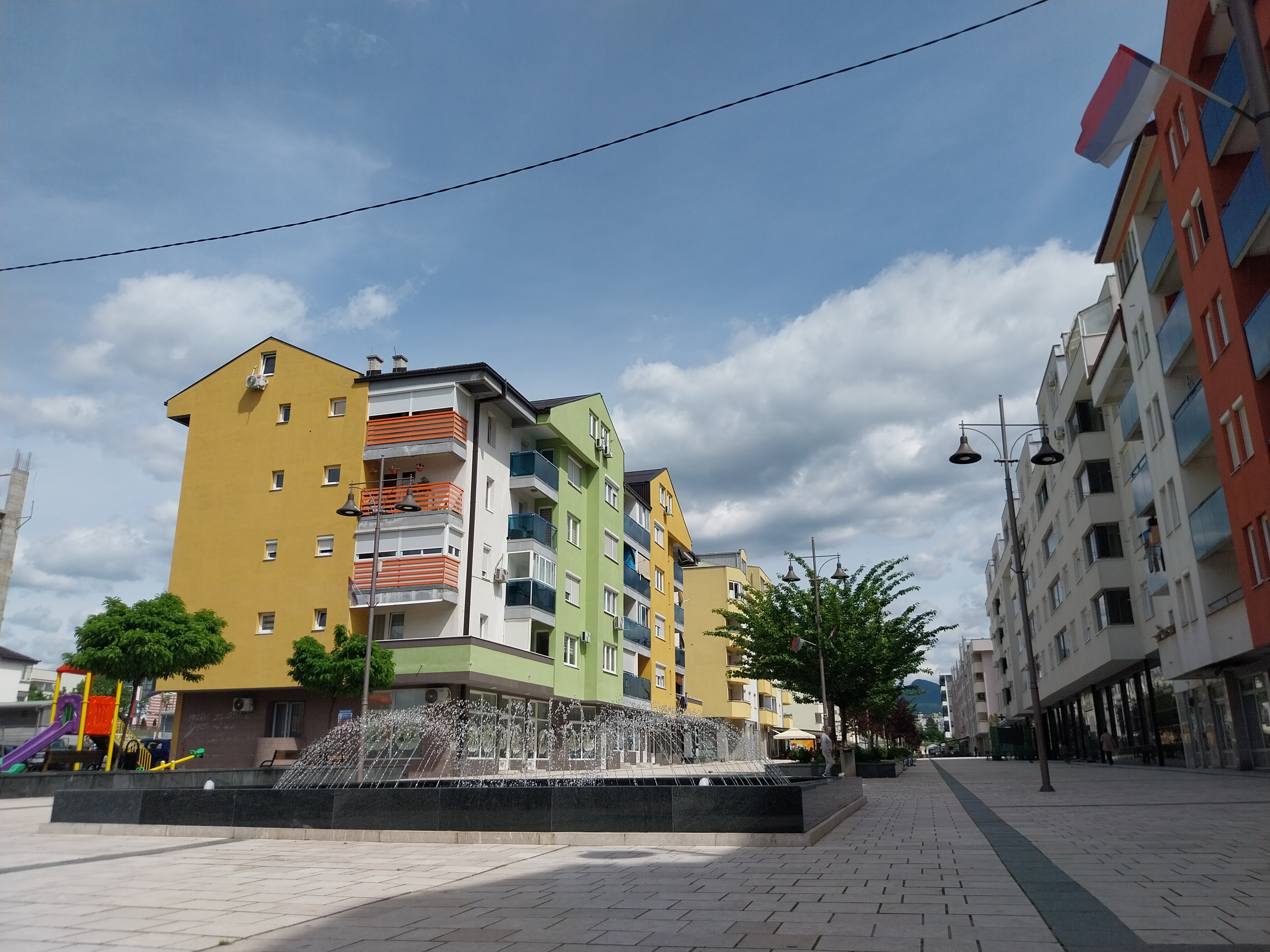
- City promenade of the Istočno Sarajevo is located in Istočna Ilidža

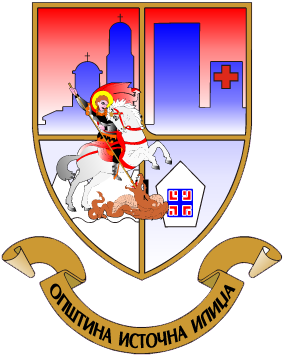
- Coat of arms

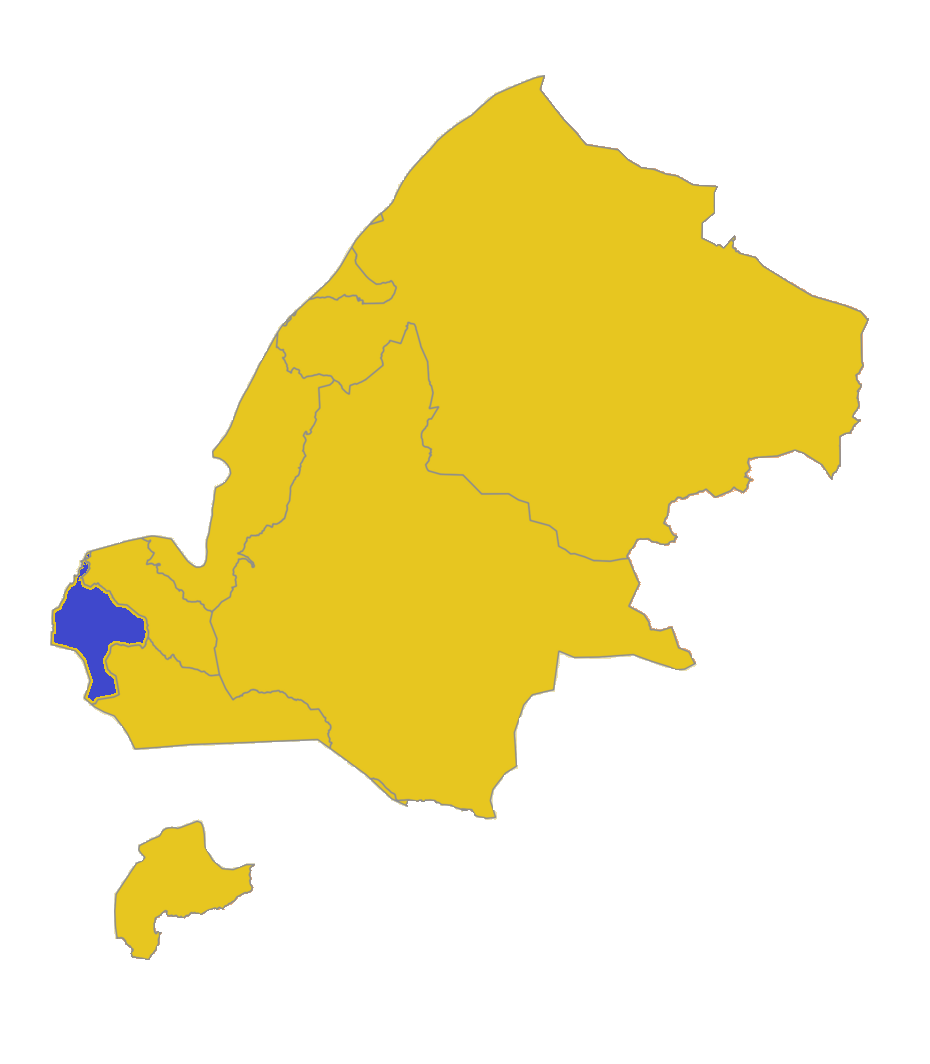
- Location of Istočna Ilidža within the city of Istočno Sarajevo
- Coordinates: 44°15′N 18°41′E
- Country: Bosnia and Herzegovina
- Entity: Republika Srpska
- City: Istočno Sarajevo
- Status: Urban
- Founded: 1995; 31 years ago

Government
  - Municipal mayor: Marinko Božović (SDS)
  - Municipality: 27.9 km^{2} (10.8 sq mi)

Population (2013 census)
  - Town: 14,241
  - Municipality: 14,763
  - Municipality density: 529/km^{2} (1,370/sq mi)
- Time zone: UTC+1 (CET)
  - Summer (DST): UTC+2 (CEST)
- Postal code: 71123
- Area code: +387 57
- Website: www.istocnailidza.net

Istočna Ilidža (Serbian Cyrillic: Источна Илиџа, lit. East Ilidža) is a municipality in the city of Istočno Sarajevo, Republika Srpska, Bosnia and Herzegovina. In 2022, it had an estimated population of 14,035 inhabitants. Together with Istočno Novo Sarajevo, it is urban area of the Istočno Sarajevo and suburban part of Sarajevo. Sarajevo International Airport is located nearby.

== History ==
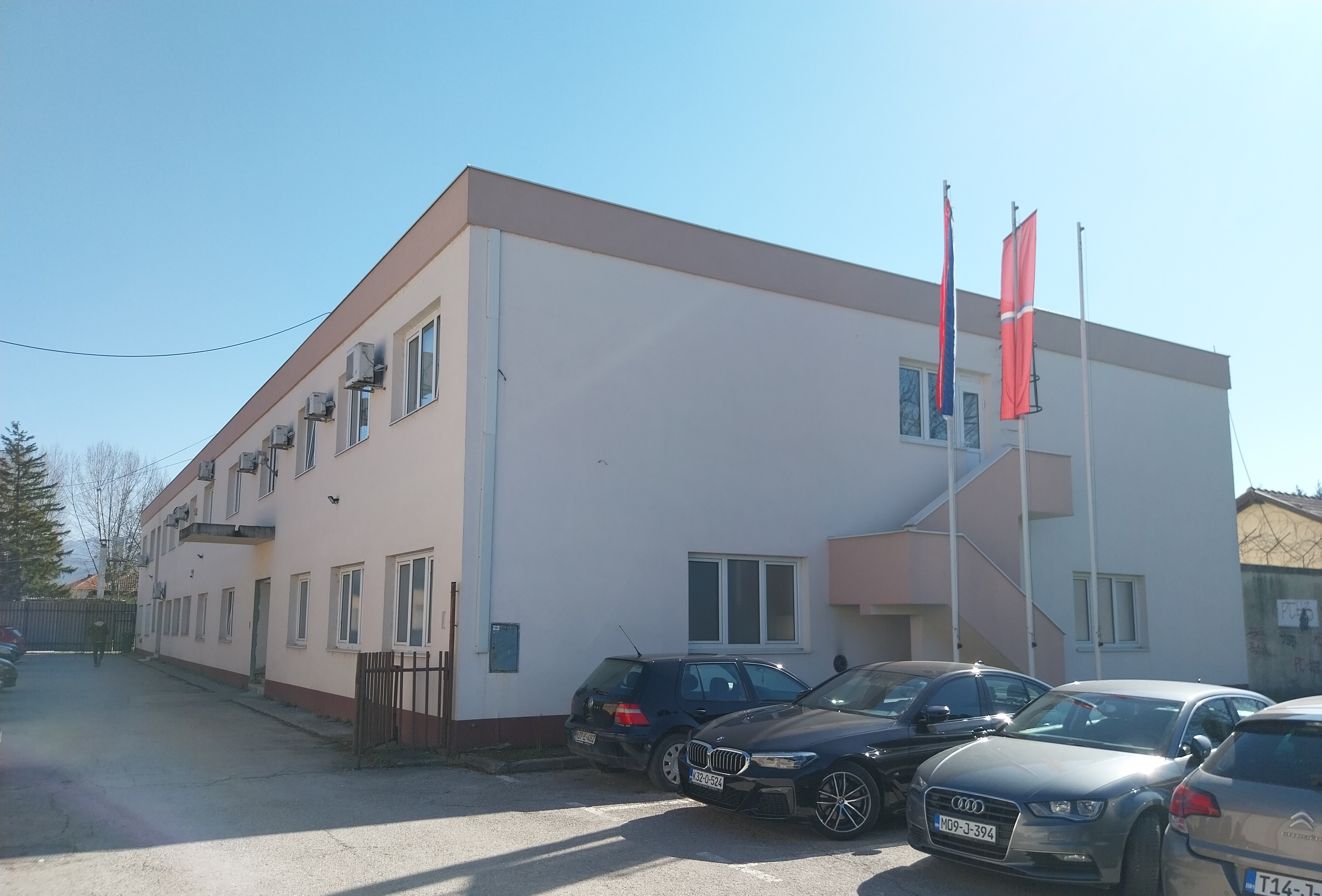
Municipality Building of Istočna Ilidža is located in Kula neighbourhood

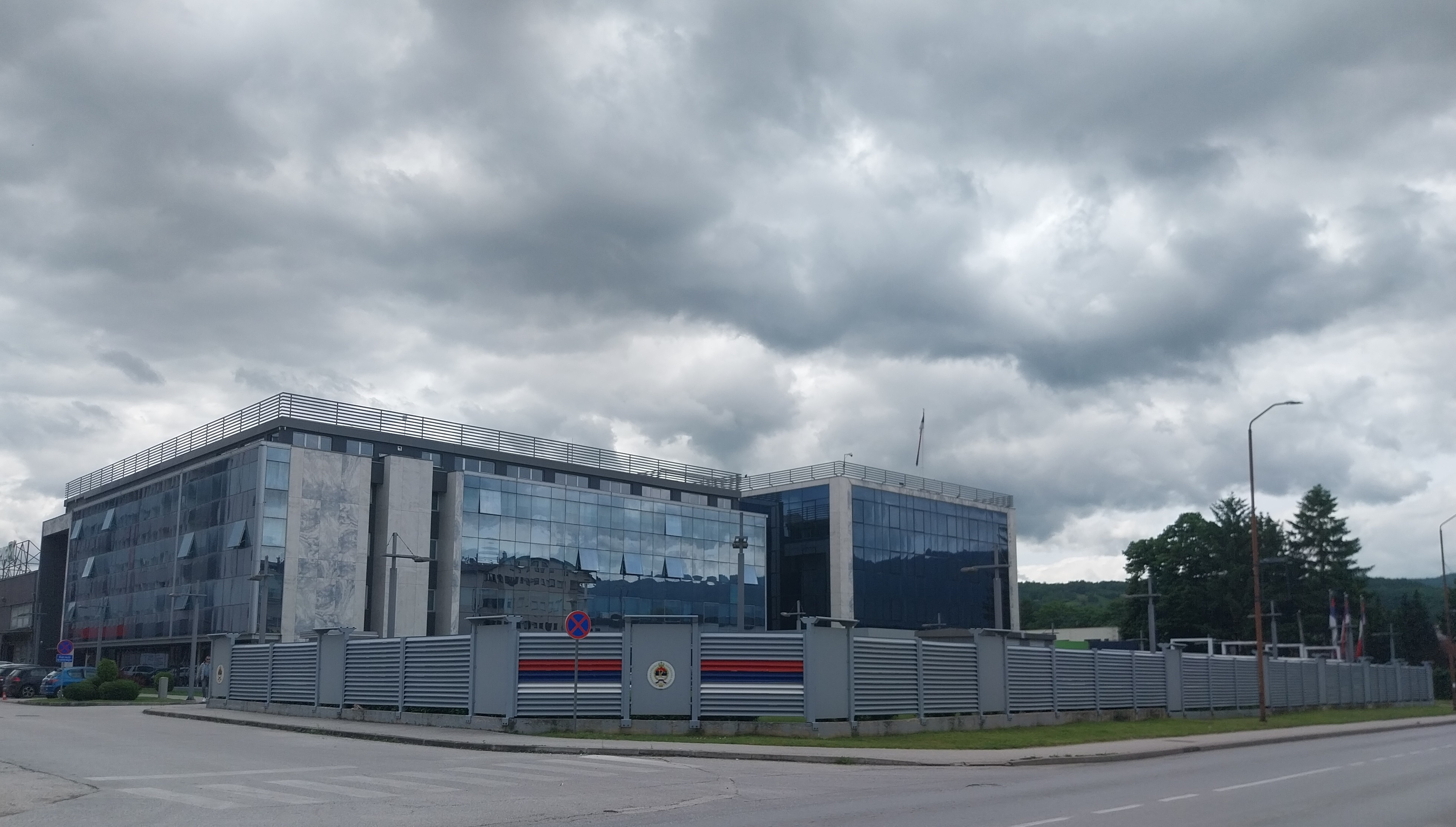
Administrative Center of the Government of Republika Srpska in Istočno Sarajevo is located in Istočna Ilidža

It was created with the signing of Dayton Peace Agreement in 1995 as Srpska Ilidža (Serbian Ilidža) from parts of the pre-war municipalities of Ilidža and Novi Grad (the other parts of the pre-war municipalities are now in the Canton Sarajevo in the Federation of Bosnia and Herzegovina). Following the decision on the name of the cities in 2004 by the Constitutional Court of Bosnia and Herzegovina, which outruled the use of the prefix Srpski (Serbian), the municipality 2005 was renamed Istočna Ilidža (East Ilidža). From 2004 to 2005 the municipality was used name Kasindo.

Istočna Ilidža is the smallest municipality in the Istočno Sarajevo by territory size, but it is the most densely populated. The largest neighborhoods are Dobrinja 1 and Dobrinja 4, followed by Vojkovići and Kasindo.

In Istočna Ilidža there is three elementary school "Jovan Dučić" in Kasindo, "Aleksa Šandić" in Vojkovići and "Petar II Petrović Njegoš" in Istočna Ilidža. There is also High School "Istočna Ilidža", located in Istočno Novo Sarajevo.

Istočna Ilidža is homeplace of Administrative center of the Government of the Republika Srpska in Istočno Sarajevo. In neighbourhood Kasindo is located hospital in Istočno Sarajevo. Also, main bus station in Istočno Sarajevo is located in Dobrinja 1. The local football club is FK Famos, which competes in the First League of the Republika Srpska.

There have been some proposals for the municipality to be merged with that of Istočno Novo Sarajevo.

== Administration ==
=== Settlements ===
The municipality of Istočna Ilidža consists of five settlements: Vojkovići, Dobrinja, Kasindo and Kula. All institutions of municipality are located in neighborhood of Kula.

=== Neighborhood ===
City neighborhoods of the Istočna Ilidža are: Kasindo, Bijelo Polje, Vojkovići, Donje Mladice, Dobrinja 1, Dobrinja 4, Kula, Mladičko Polje, Naselje Starosjedilaca and Pavlovac.

=== Municipal mayors ===
Municipal mayors were:

- Dušan Šehovac, SDS (1996 — 2004)
- Predrag Kovač, SDS (2004 — 2015)
- Miljan Damjanović, SDS (2015 — 2016)
- Marinko Božović, SDS (2016 — present)

== Demographics ==
Ethnic composition of Istočna Ilidža
year of census	2013
Serbs	13.755 (93,17%)
Bosniaks	648 (4,389%)
Croats	156 (1,057%)
Others	204 (1,382%)
total	14.763 (100,0%)

== International cooperation ==
Istočna Ilidža is twinned with the following cities and municipalities:

- Crveni Krst, Serbia (2021)
- Pantelej, Serbia (2021)
- Shuya, Russia (2025)

== Gallery ==
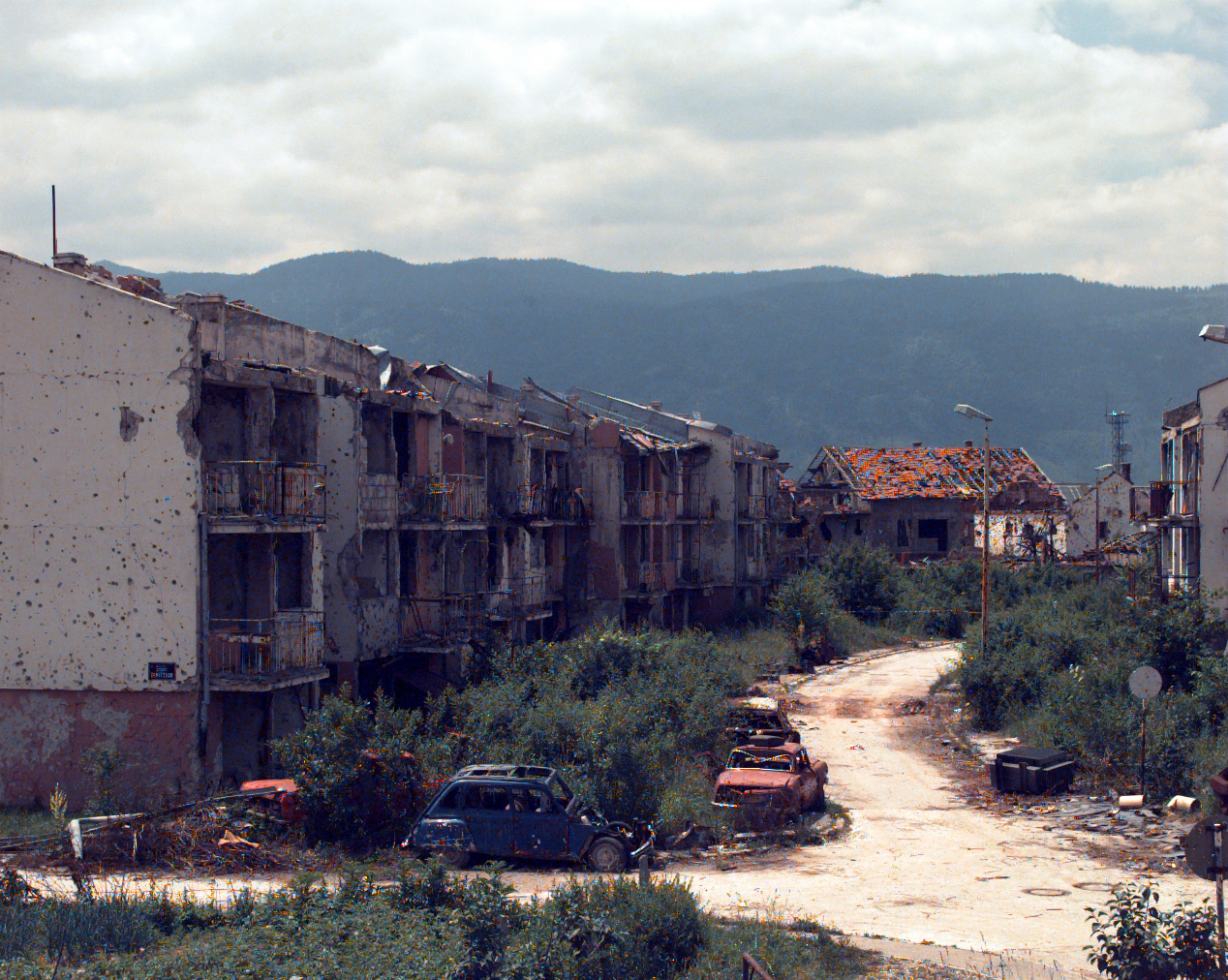
Parts of the modern-day city during the Bosnian war

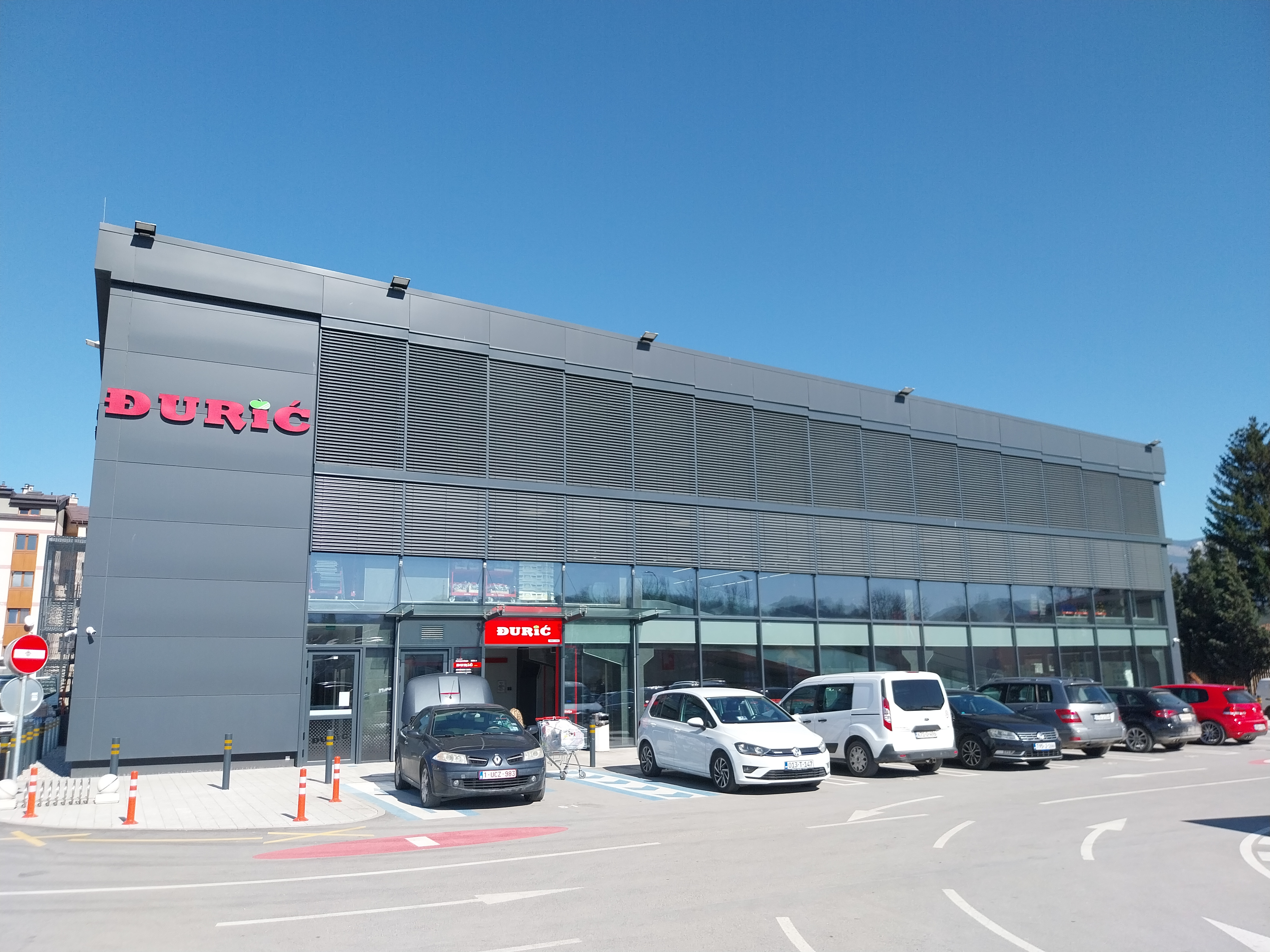
Đurić Supermarket

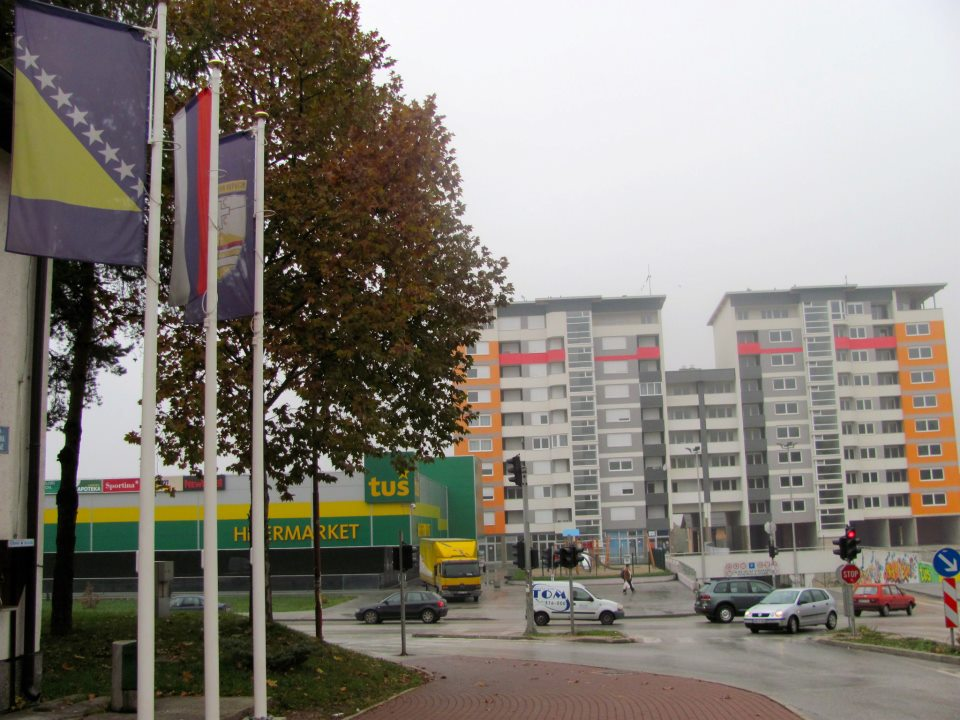
City gate

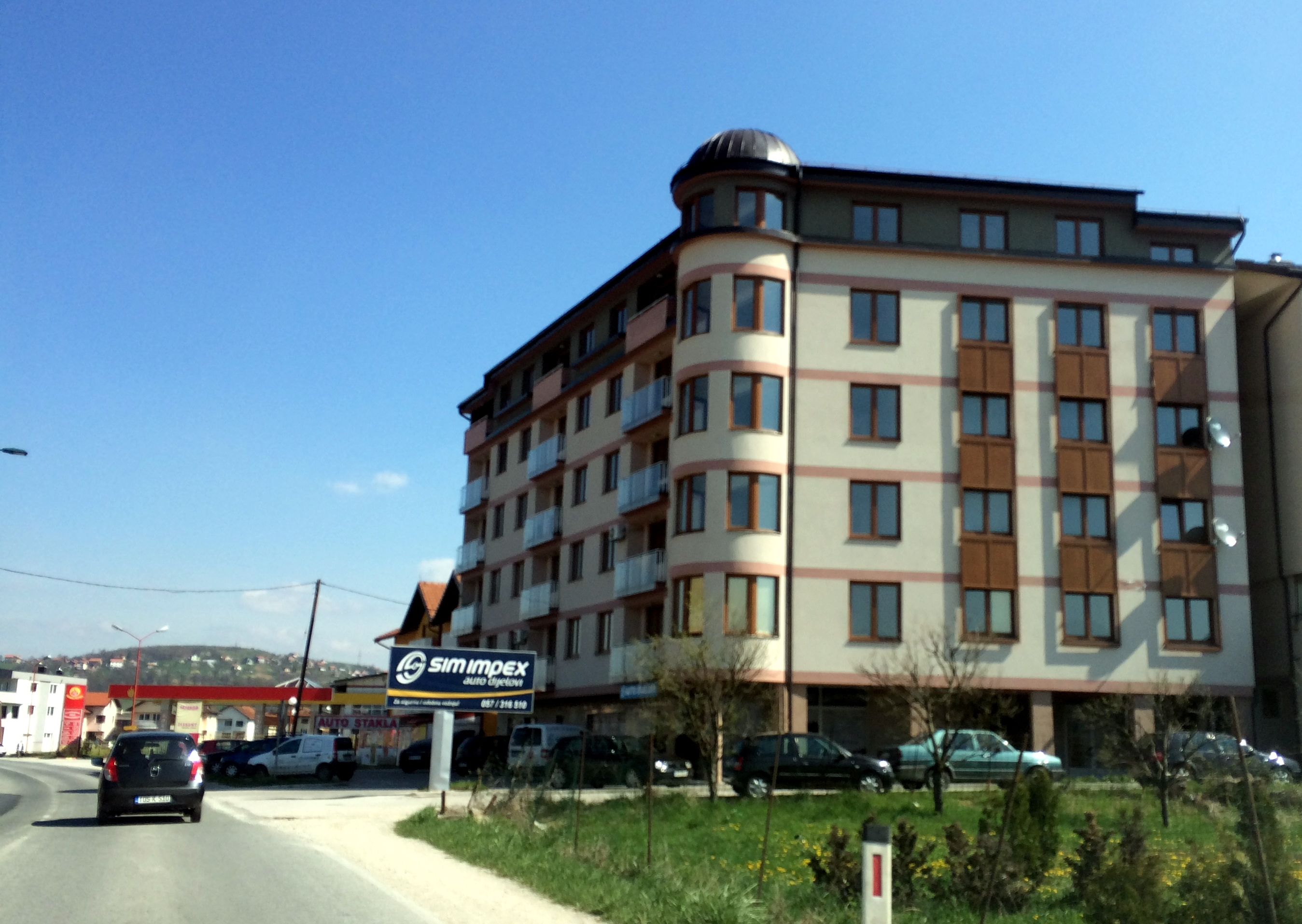
New buildings

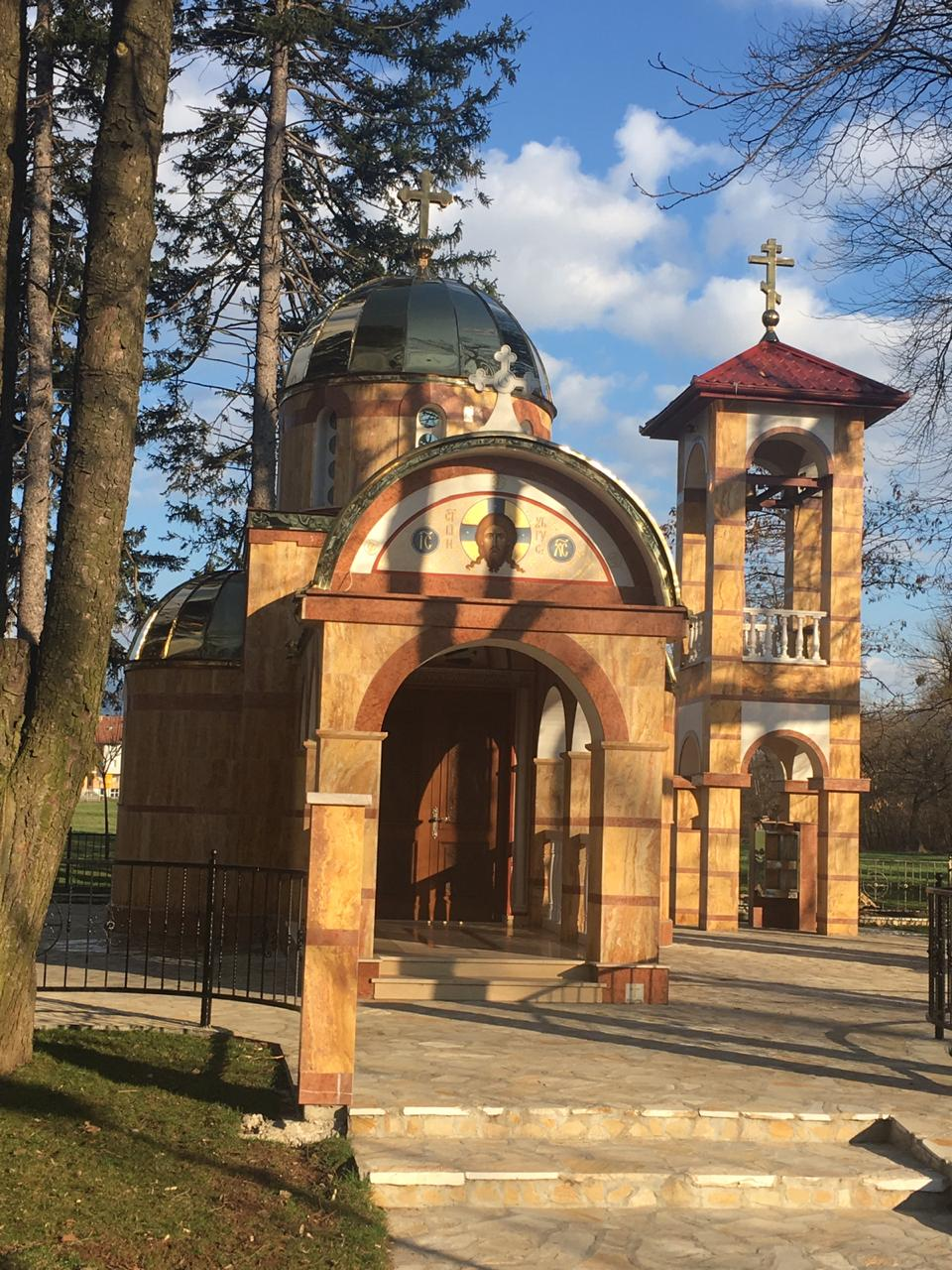
Serbian Orthodox church
