= Dnevni avaz =

Bosnian newspaper

- Type: Daily newspaper
- Owner: avaz-roto press
- Founder: Fahrudin Radončić
- Publisher: avaz-roto press
- Editor-in-chief: Nermin Demirović
- Deputy editor: Miralem Aščić
- Founded: 15 September 1993; 33 years ago
- Language: Bosnian (NYT supplement in English)
- Headquarters: Avaz Twist Tower; Tešanjska 24b, Sarajevo
- City: 71000 Sarajevo
- Country: Bosnia and Herzegovina
- ISSN: 1840-3522
- Website: avaz.ba

Avaz.ba
- Website type: News
- Available in: 2 languages
- List of languages Bosnian, English
- Owner: avaz-roto press
- Website: avaz.ba
- Current status: Active

Dnevni avaz (Bosnian pronunciation: [dnêːʋniː ǎʋaːz]; English: Daily Voice) is the Bosnian national daily newspaper, published in Sarajevo in English and Bosnian. Their news website Avaz.ba is the third most visited website in Bosnia and Herzegovina, after Google and YouTube.

== Background ==
Dnevni avaz evolved from a weekly publication Bošnjački avaz which was first published in September 1993. In 1994, it became known simply as Avaz and was published weekly in Bosnia and Herzegovina and Germany. In 1995, it was reestablished by Fahrudin Radončić as a daily newspaper.

Dnevni avaz is part of the "avaz-roto press" publishing house, the biggest media house in Bosnia and Herzegovina. The paper is based in Sarajevo and has a relative pro-Bosniak and pro-Bosnian stance (centre-right).

In 2006, the Avaz publishing house was expanded with the start of the construction of the Avaz Twist Tower, a 175 m skyscraper in Sarajevo's Marijin Dvor neighborhood, in the Centar Municipality of Sarajevo. As of 2016, it was the tallest skyscraper in Bosnia and Herzegovina.
