= Official Gazette of Bosnia and Herzegovina =

Government gazette of Bosnia and Herzegovina

Službeni glasnik Bosne i Hercegovine
- Type: Official gazette
- Owner(s): Government of Bosnia and Herzegovina
- Founder(s): Government of the Condominium of Bosnia and Herzegovina
- Publisher: JP NIO Službeni list BiH; Javno preduzeće Novinsko-izdavačka organizacija Službeni list Bosne i Hercegovine
- Editor: Dragan Prusina, director and editor-in-chief since No. 48/06, 26 June 2006
- Founded: 1 September 1878
- Language: Bosnian, Croatian, Serbian
- Headquarters: Sarajevo, Bosnia and Herzegovina
- Website: http://sluzbenilist.ba

The Official Gazette of Bosnia and Herzegovina (Serbo-Croatian: Službeni glasnik Bosne i Hercegovine / Službene novine Bosne i Hercegovine / Službeni list Bosne i Hercegovine) is the official gazette (or newspaper of public record) of Bosnia and Herzegovina, which publishes laws, regulations, official government contracts, appointments and official decisions and releases them in the public domain.

== History ==
The Gazette was founded on 1 September 1878 under the name Bosansko-hercegovačke novine - Službeni list, by the government of the Condominium of Bosnia and Herzegovina, under Austro-Hungarian Empire control.

== Function ==
From 20 June 1945, according to the Regulations (3/45), the Official Gazette of the constituent Yugoslav Federal Republic of Bosnia and Herzegovina is an independent institution of the Ministry of Justice. From 1 January 1947, according to the Regulation (8/47), the Official Gazette of the People's Republic of Bosnia and Herzegovina is described as an economic institution under the Government of the People's Republic of Bosnia and Herzegovina. According to the Regulations (16/47), from 19 March 1947, the Gazette is a state institution under the Presidency of the Government of the People's Republic of Bosnia and Herzegovina, and according to the Law (13/47) the Official Gazette is an institution of the Presidency of the Government of the People's Republic of Bosnia and Herzegovina and has property and legal autonomy. From 25 January 1996, according to the Law on News Publishing Organization, the Official Gazette of the Republic of Bosnia and Herzegovina, No. 2/96, continues its work as a public company newspaper and publishing organization of particular social interest, under Regulations applicable to companies in the field of publishing. The company is managed by a board of directors consisting of a president and four members, whereas the president and two members are appointed among the members of the republic bodies, and two members among the employees. The company is managed by the director, who is also the editor-in-chief. The Gazette is run by the public company Javno preduzeće Novinsko-izdavačka organizacija Službeni list Bosne i Hercegovine, abbreviated as JP NIO Službeni list BiH. The Gazette's operations are regulated by the number of laws, the most recent being the Law on News-Publishing Organization Official Gazette of the Republic of Bosnia and Herzegovina, published in Official Gazette of the Republic of Bosnia and Herzegovina, No. 2/96 from 25 January 1996, and followed by the Law on the Official Gazette of Bosnia and Herzegovina published in the Official Gazette of Bosnia and Herzegovina, No. 1/97 from 29 October 1997.

The Gazette promulgates acts, laws and legislation, regulations, official government contracts, appointments and official decisions of all three government branches of Bosnia and Herzegovina, the Parliament of Bosnia and Herzegovina, the Government of Bosnia and Herzegovina, and of the Presidency of Bosnia and Herzegovina

Since No. 48/06, of 26 June 2006, Dragan Prusina was named the director and editor-in-chief of the Gazette.

== See also ==
- Government of Bosnia and Herzegovina
- Parliament of Bosnia and Herzegovina
- Constitutional Court of Bosnia and Herzegovina
