= Josip Grubeša =

Bosnian politician (born 1978)

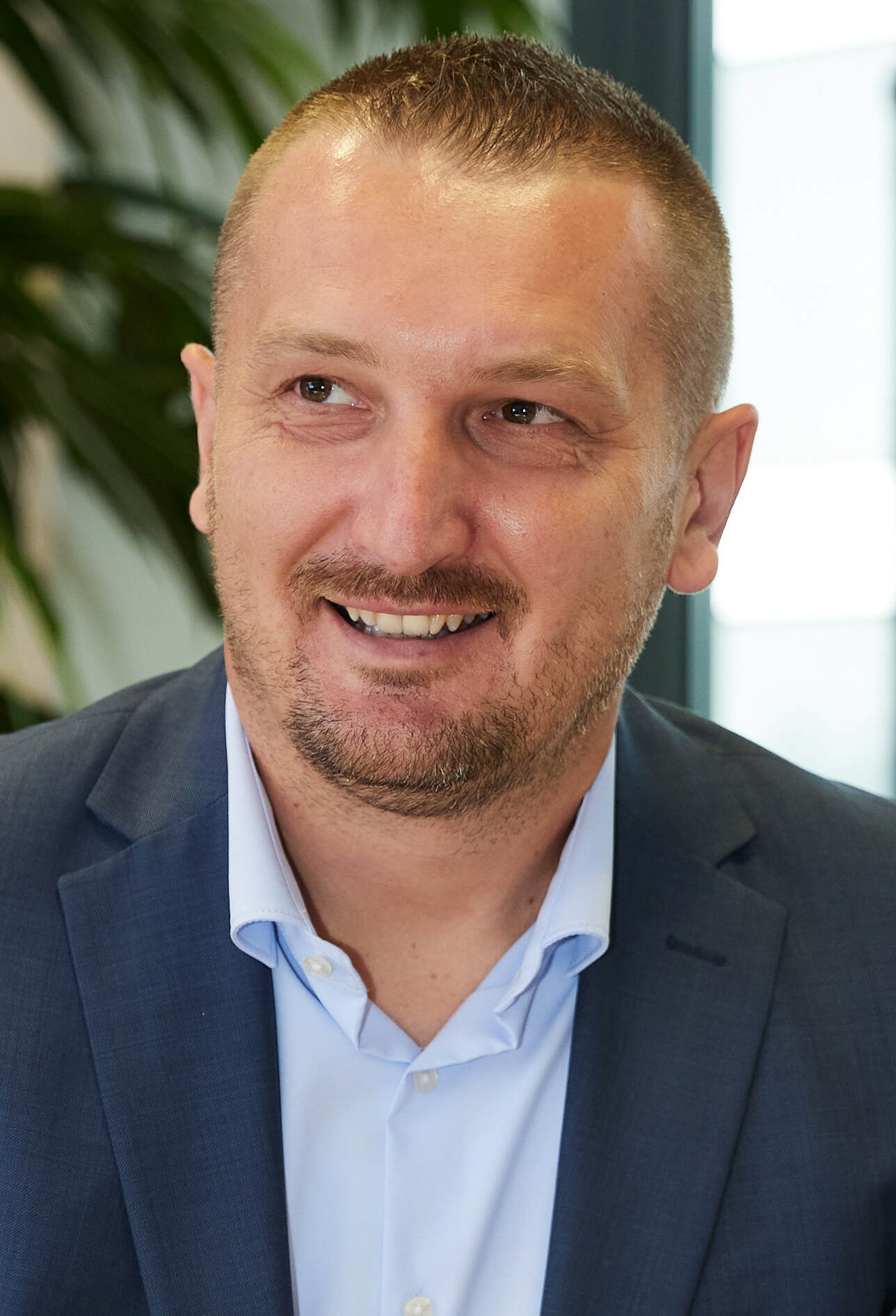
- Grubeša in 2021

Minister of Justice
- In office 31 March 2015 – 25 January 2023
- Prime Minister: Denis Zvizdić; Zoran Tegeltija
- Preceded by: Bariša Čolak
- Succeeded by: Davor Bunoza

Personal details
- Born: 4 November 1978 (age 47) Prozor-Rama, SR Bosnia and Herzegovina, SFR Yugoslavia
- Party: Croatian Democratic Union
- Children: 3
- Education: University of Split; University of Mostar

Josip Grubeša (born 4 November 1978) is a Bosnian Croat Latin scholar and politician who served as Minister of Justice from 2015 to 2023. He is a member of the Croatian Democratic Union.

== Early life and career ==
Grubeša, a Bosnian Croat, was born on 4 November 1978 in Prozor-Rama, SR Bosnia and Herzegovina, SFR Yugoslavia.

In 1997, he graduated from the Archdiocese's Gymnasium of Zadar, after which he graduated in Latin literature from the Faculty of Philosophy at the University of Split. He was then employed in the Faculty of Philosophy of the University of Mostar in 2003. Seven years later, Grubeša started working as a visiting professor at the Medical and Law Faculty of the University of Mostar, which he still does today. In 2011, he graduated again, at the Faculty of Philosophy of the University of Mostar. Since that same year, he has been a member of the Presidency of the Croatian Democratic Union.

On 31 March 2015, Grubeša was appointed as the new Minister of Justice within the government led by Denis Zvizdić. He stayed as minister in the government of Zoran Tegeltija as well. In 2018, he was widely criticised for signing the transfer to Croatia of convicted war criminal Marko Radić, who was later released after a Zagreb court reduced his sentence. In February 2021, Grubeša was almost released from his duties as minister after the national House of Representatives was on verge of voting for his dismissal, but just narrowly, voted against. He was succeeded as minister by Davor Bunoza on 25 January 2023, following the formation of a new government presided over by Borjana Krišto.

== Personal life ==
Grubeša is married with three children. In addition to Croatian, Grubeša also speaks German and English.

Political offices
Preceded by Bariša Čolak	Minister of Justice; 2015–2023	Succeeded by Davor Bunoza
