= Ministry of Human Rights and Refugees =

Government ministry of Bosnia and Herzegovina

Ministry of Human Rights and Refugees of Bosnia and Herzegovina
- Ministarstvo za ljudska prava i izbjeglice Bosne i Hercegovine; Министарство за људска права и избјеглице Босне и Херцеговине

- Greece–Bosnia and Herzegovina Friendship Building, seat of the Ministry of Human Rights and Refugees of Bosnia and Herzegovina

Department overview
- Formed: 2000
- Headquarters: Sarajevo, Bosnia and Herzegovina
- Minister responsible: Sevlid Hurtić
- Website: mhrr.gov.ba

The Ministry of Human Rights and Refugees of Bosnia and Herzegovina (Serbo-Croatian: Ministarstvo za ljudska prava i izbjeglice Bosne i Hercegovine / Министарство за људска права и избјеглице Босне и Херцеговине) is a government ministry responsible for human rights, refugees and related issues in Bosnia and Herzegovina.

== History ==
Following the independence of Bosnia and Herzegovina in 1992, the Ministry of Human Rights and Refugees began operating at the level of the newly established Republic of Bosnia and Herzegovina. After the end of the Bosnian War and the signing of the Dayton Agreement, the Ministry of Human Rights and Refugees of the Federation of Bosnia and Herzegovina and the Ministry of Human Rights and Refugees of the Republika Srpska functioned before the creation of the present-day state-level ministry.

In 2000, the entity ministries responsible for human rights and refugees were merged into the Ministry of Human Rights and Refugees of Bosnia and Herzegovina, with Martin Raguž becoming the first minister.

Since 25 January 2023, Sevlid Hurtić has served as Minister of Human Rights and Refugees of Bosnia and Herzegovina.

== Responsibilities ==
The Ministry of Human Rights and Refugees of Bosnia and Herzegovina is headed by the Minister of Human Rights and Refugees. According to the Council of Ministers of Bosnia and Herzegovina, the ministry is responsible for matters including refugee rights, the implementation of Annex 7 of the Dayton Agreement, return policy, reconstruction projects and the protection of human rights.

The ministry administers and oversees the following areas:

- care for refugees, displaced persons, readmission and housing policy;
- protection of human rights;
- emigration;
- reconstruction, development, monitoring and regional centres.

== List of ministers ==
=== Ministers of Human Rights and Refugees (2000–present) ===
Political parties:
Croatian Democratic Union (HDZ BiH)
New Croatian Initiative (NHI)
Party of Democratic Action (SDA)
Party for Bosnia and Herzegovina (SBiH)
Croatian Democratic Union 1990 (HDZ 1990)
Democratic People's Alliance (DNS)
Bosnian-Herzegovinian Greens (BHZ)

No.	Portrait	Minister of Human Rights and Refugees	Took office	Left office	Time in office	Party
1	Martin Raguž	Martin Raguž (born 1958)	22 June 2000	22 February 2001	245 days	HDZ BiH
2	Krešimir Zubak	Krešimir Zubak (born 1947)	22 February 2001	23 December 2002	1 year, 304 days	NHI
3	Mirsad Kebo	Mirsad Kebo (born 1947)	23 December 2002	11 January 2007	4 years, 19 days	SDA
4	Safet Halilović	Safet Halilović (1951–2017)	11 January 2007	12 January 2012	5 years, 1 day	SBiH
5	Damir Ljubić	Damir Ljubić (born 1965)	12 January 2012	31 March 2015	3 years, 78 days	HDZ 1990
6	Semiha Borovac	Semiha Borovac (born 1955)	31 March 2015	23 December 2019	4 years, 267 days	SDA
7	Miloš Lučić	Miloš Lučić (born 1986)	15 May 2020	12 December 2022	2 years, 211 days	DNS
8	Sevlid Hurtić	Sevlid Hurtić (born 1970)	25 January 2023	Incumbent	3 years, 195 days	BHZ
