= Minka Kreho =

Bosnian judge (born 1960)

Acting president of the Court of Bosnia and Herzegovina
- Incumbent
- Assumed office 21 December 2023
- Preceded by: Ranko Debevec

Personal details
- Born: 1960 (age 65–66) Sarajevo, Yugoslavia
- Education: University of Sarajevo

Minka Kreho (born 1960) is a Bosnian judge. She is member of the Court of Bosnia and Herzegovina since 2007 and has been its acting president since 2023.

== Early life ==
Kreho was born in 1960 in Sarajevo, then Yugoslavia. She got a degree in law from the University of Sarajevo in 1987.

== Career ==
She began her judicial career with a traineeship at the Republika Srpska Court for Minor Offences in Sarajevo, after which she qualified by passing the examination for magistrates in minor offences. She then joined the Municipal Court for Minor Offences of Centar Municipality in Sarajevo as a legal assistant. In 1991, Kreho was appointed magistrate at that same court, a role she held until 1995. She passed the judicial exam in 1993, and in 1995 she was appointed judge of the Municipal Court I in Sarajevo, where she worked until 2003, when she became a judge of the Sarajevo Cantonal Court.

On 18 January 2007, she was appointed a judge of the Court of Bosnia and Herzegovina. After the arrest and subsequent suspension of Ranko Debevec over the suspicion of abuse of office, Kreho was appointed unanimously as the acting president of the Court on 21 December 2023 by the High Judicial and Prosecutorial Council of Bosnia and Herzegovina. Following her appointment, Kreho issued a statement highlighting the exceptional nature of the institutional situation, reaffirming the Court’s commitment to the rule of law, assuring that the Court would continue to function, and calling on the media to provide objective information in accordance with legal standards.
