= Sevlid Hurtić =

Bosnian politician (born 1970)

Minister of Human Rights and Refugees
- Incumbent
- Assumed office 25 January 2023
- Prime Minister: Borjana Krišto
- Preceded by: Miloš Lučić
Parliamentary offices
Member of the National Assembly of Republika Srpska
In office
15 November 2022 – 25 January 2023

Personal details
- Born: 2 January 1970 (age 56) Doboj, SR Bosnia and Herzegovina, SFR Yugoslavia
- Party: Bosnian-Herzegovinian Greens (2022–present)
- Children: 5

Sevlid Hurtić (born 2 January 1970) is a Bosnian politician serving as Minister of Human Rights and Refugees since January 2023. He previously served as member of the National Assembly of Republika Srpska. Hurtić is the founder and current president of the Bosnian-Herzegovinian Greens.

== Early life and education ==
Hurtić was born in Doboj on 2 January 1970, where he finished elementary and secondary education. He completed postgraduate studies in economics in 2015 and obtained a PhD in 2019.

== Political career ==
Hurtić served as Minister of Commerce and Tourism in the Government of Republika Srpska. Following the 2018 general election, he filed legal complaints due to receiving exactly zero votes in voting booths 1 and 2 of the 5th electoral district Doboj, despite party members and others having voted there.

On 2 March 2022, Hurtić founded the Bosnian-Herzegovinian Greens political party, becoming its president. In the 2022 general election, he was elected to the National Assembly of Republika Srpska.

On 25 January 2023, following the formation of a new Council of Ministers presided over by Borjana Krišto, Hurtić was appointed as the new Minister of Human Rights and Refugees in Krišto's cabinet.

== Personal life ==
Hurtić is married and has five children.

Political offices
Preceded by Miloš Lučić	Minister of Human Rights and Refugees; 2023–present	Incumbent
