= Prosecutor's Office of Bosnia and Herzegovina =

Logo of the Prosecutor’s Office of BiH which is also the coat of arms of Bosnia and Herzegovina.

The Prosecutor’s Office of Bosnia and Herzegovina (Bosnian: Tužilaštvo Bosne i Hercegovine, Croatian: Tužiteljstvo Bosne i Hercegovine, Serbian: Тужилаштво Босне и Херцеговине; abbreviated as the Prosecutor’s Office of BiH in English) is a domestic prosecutor of the State of Bosnia and Herzegovina which includes international prosecutors. It was established in October 2002 by the Parliament of Bosnia and Herzegovina with the Law on the Court of BiH and promulgated in August 2002 by the High Representative for Bosnia and Herzegovina. As of March 2025, Prosecutor's Office has no jurisdiction in Republika Srpska, one of the two entities of Bosnia and Herzegovina

== History ==
In October 2003 the Parliamentary Assembly of Bosnia and Herzegovina adopted the Law on the Prosecutor’s Office of Bosnia and Herzegovina which was enacted by the Decision of the High Representatives of Bosnia and Herzegovina issued in August 2002. The first four National Prosecutors were appointed for their positions in the Prosecutor’s Office of Bosnia and Herzegovina on 16 January 2002. The first International Prosecutor in the Special Department for Organised Crime, Economic Crime and Corruption within the Prosecutor’s Office was appointed by the High Representative in March 2003.

Announcing the Completion Strategy of the International Criminal Tribunal for the Former Yugoslavia in 2003 it was obvious that the Court of Bosnia and Herzegovina and the Prosecutor’s Office of Bosnia and Herzegovina should have jurisdiction over the prosecution of war crimes and they should take over the war crime cases from the Hague Tribunal. Therefore, in 2004 a set of legal acts was drafted and it was adopted by the BiH Parliament in December 2004. In January 2005 the third department, the War Crimes Department, was established within the Prosecutor’s Office of Bosnia and Herzegovina which prosecutes war crime cases.

== Jurisdiction ==
The Constitution of Bosnia and Herzegovina stipulates jurisdiction of the Prosecutor’s Offices at the entity levels whereas the Prosecutor’s Office of Bosnia and Herzegovina was additionally established as an institution with special jurisdiction for proceedings before the Court of Bosnia and Herzegovina against crimes stipulated by the Law on the Court of BiH, Law on Prosecutor’s Office of BiH, Criminal Code of BiH, Criminal Procedure Code of BiH, Law on Transfer of Cases from the International Criminal Tribunal for the Former Yugoslavia to the Prosecutor’s Office of BiH.

The jurisdiction and scope of activities of the Prosecutor's Office are stipulated by the Law on Prosecutor's Office of Bosnia and Herzegovina whereby the Prosecutor's Office is:

- an organ competent for conducting investigations of criminal offences under the jurisdiction of the Court of Bosnia and Herzegovina according to the Criminal Procedure Code of Bosnia and Herzegovina and other applicable laws,

- an organ competent for receiving requests for international legal assistance in criminal matters according to the laws, multilateral and bilateral agreements and conventions including extradition or transfer of persons wanted by the courts or organs from the territory of Bosnia and Herzegovina and other States, or the international courts or tribunals,

- an organ in charge of producing statistical reports on its activities (Progress Report) including information on the status of criminality in Bosnia and Herzegovina and it points to tendencies in its prevalence. In conclusion to this information, the Chief Prosecutor may propose legal reforms.

The Prosecutor's Office of BiH is a sui generis institution and it is not superior to the entity Prosecutor's Offices but its jurisdiction is limited to prosecution of crimes stipulated by the aforementioned laws.

Other prosecutor's offices in BiH were established under the current political and administrative structure of Bosnia and Herzegovina whereby the Federal Prosecutor's Office of the Federation of BiH is the „supreme“ Prosecutor's Office for ten Cantonal Prosecutor's Offices from the area of the Federation of Bosnia and Herzegovina. The Republic Prosecutor's Office of Republika Srpska is a „supreme“ Prosecutor's Office for fice District Prosecutor's Offices from the area of Republika Srpska.

The Public Prosecutor's Office of the Brčko District is competent for the area of the District.

== Criticism ==
United Nations officials in 2008 called on the office to be more "pro-active" in going after war crimes fugitives, such as Ratko Mladić, Radovan Karadžić, Stojan Župljanin and Goran Hadžić. All have subsequently been captured.
