= Vojkovići, Istočna Ilidža =

Vojkovići Војковићи
- Location within Bosnia and Herzegovina
- Coordinates: 43°47′45″N 18°20′37″E
- Country: Bosnia and Herzegovina
- Entity: Republika Srpska
- Municipality: Istočna Ilidža
- Time zone: UTC+1 (CET)
  - Summer (DST): UTC+2 (CEST)

Vojkovići (Serbian Cyrillic: Војковићи) is a part of the City of Istočno Sarajevo in Istočna Ilidža Municipality, Republika Srpska, Bosnia and Herzegovina.

== Sports ==
Local football club Famos have played 8 seasons at Bosnia and Herzegovina's second level and play their home games at the Stadion u centru Vojkovića.
