= Davor Bunoza =

Bosnian Croat lawyer and politician (born 1980)

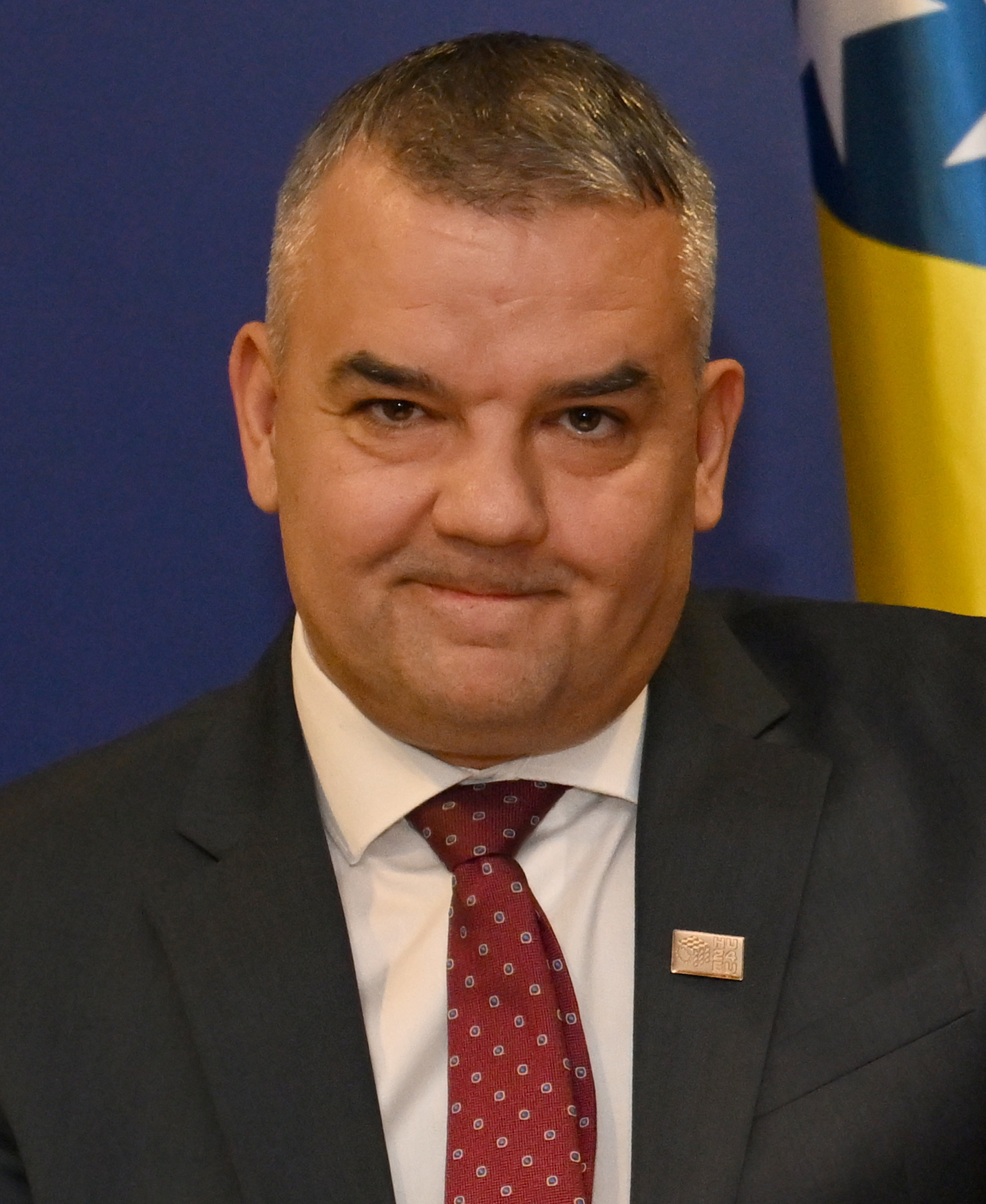
- Bunoza in 2024

Minister of Justice
- Incumbent
- Assumed office 25 January 2023
- Prime Minister: Borjana Krišto
- Preceded by: Josip Grubeša

Personal details
- Born: 3 April 1980 (age 46) Mostar, SR Bosnia and Herzegovina, SFR Yugoslavia
- Party: Independent
- Children: 1
- Education: University of Mostar (LLB)

Davor Bunoza (born 3 April 1980) is a Bosnian Croat lawyer and politician who has served as Minister of Justice since January 2023. Despite being nominated by the Croatian Democratic Union, he is not officially a member of any political party.

== Early life and education ==
Bunoza was born in Mostar, where he also completed high school. He graduated with a bachelor's degree in law at the University of Mostar in 2005.

== Career ==
From 2006 to 2007, Bunoza worked in the "Sesar-Ćurić-Miletić" law office. Then, from 2007 to 2011, he worked in the "Your Rights BiH" Association. Since 2011, he has been practicing as an independent lawyer. In 2015, Bunoza co-founded the law firm "Paponja-Bunoza" in Mostar with lawyer Darislav Paponja.

On 25 January 2023, following the formation of a new Council of Ministers presided over by Borjana Krišto, Bunoza was appointed as the new Minister of Justice in Krišto's cabinet.

== Personal life ==
Besides being a lawyer, Bunoza is also a musician and former member of the band Twist from Mostar. It is a musical group that mainly plays at weddings in Herzegovina. Davor's brother Damir Bunoza is also in the music business, as a conductor.

Bunoza is married and has one child.

Political offices
| Preceded by Josip Grubeša | Minister of Justice; 2023–present | Incumbent |
