= Ministry of Security (Bosnia and Herzegovina) =

Government ministry of Bosnia and Herzegovina

Ministry of Security of Bosnia and Herzegovina
- Ministarstvo sigurnosti Bosne i Hercegovine; Министарство безбједности Босне и Херцеговине

- Greece–Bosnia and Herzegovina Friendship Building, seat of the Ministry of Security of Bosnia and Herzegovina

Department overview
- Formed: 2002
- Headquarters: Sarajevo, Bosnia and Herzegovina
- Minister responsible: Ivica Bošnjak (acting)
- Website: msb.gov.ba

The Ministry of Security of Bosnia and Herzegovina (Serbo-Croatian: Ministarstvo sigurnosti Bosne i Hercegovine / Министарство безбједности Босне и Херцеговине) is a government ministry responsible for security affairs and the coordination of police bodies in Bosnia and Herzegovina.

== History ==
Following the independence of Bosnia and Herzegovina in 1992 from the Socialist Federal Republic of Yugoslavia (SFRY), the Ministry of Interior of the Republic of Bosnia and Herzegovina began operating at the level of the newly established republic, with Alija Delimustafić (SDA) as minister.

After the end of the Bosnian War and the signing of the Dayton Agreement in 1995, police responsibilities were divided between the two entities of Bosnia and Herzegovina, Republika Srpska and the Federation of Bosnia and Herzegovina, which formed their own ministries of interior. In the Federation of Bosnia and Herzegovina, police responsibilities were further divided between the cantons.

In 2002, the Ministry of Security of Bosnia and Herzegovina was formed, with Bariša Čolak (HDZ BiH) appointed as the first Minister of Security of Bosnia and Herzegovina.

After Nenad Nešić resigned in January 2025, Deputy Minister Ivica Bošnjak continued to act in the ministry's leadership role.

== Organization ==
The Ministry of Security of Bosnia and Herzegovina consists of nine sectors and one inspectorate.

- Protection and Rescue Sector
- Sector for Legal, Personnel, General and Financial-Material Affairs
- Sector for International Cooperation and European Integration
- Immigration Sector
- Asylum Sector
- Sector for Combating Terrorism, Organized Crime, Corruption, War Crimes and Narcotics Abuse
- Sector for Informatics and Telecommunication Systems
- Sector for the Protection of Classified Information
- Sector for General and Border Security
- Inspectorate

== List of ministers ==
Political parties:
Croatian Democratic Union (HDZ BiH)
Party of Democratic Action (SDA)
Social Democratic Party (SDP)
Union for a Better Future of BiH (SBB BiH)
Serb Democratic Party (SDS)
Socialist Party (SP)
Democratic People's Alliance (DNS)

No.	Portrait	Minister	Took office	Left office	Time in office	Party
1	Bariša Čolak	Bariša Čolak (born 1956)	23 December 2002	11 January 2007	4 years, 19 days	HDZ BiH
2	Tarik Sadović	Tarik Sadović (born 1956)	11 January 2007	31 July 2009	2 years, 201 days	SDA
—	Mijo Krešić	Mijo Krešić (born 1966); Acting	31 July 2009	24 November 2009	116 days	HDZ BiH
3	Sadik Ahmetović	Sadik Ahmetović (born 1969)	24 November 2009	22 October 2012	2 years, 333 days	SDA
—	Mladen Ćavar	Mladen Ćavar (born 1965); Acting	22 October 2012	22 November 2012	31 days	SDP BiH
4	Fahrudin Radončić	Fahrudin Radončić (born 1957)	22 November 2012	29 April 2014	1 year, 158 days	SBB
—	Mladen Ćavar	Mladen Ćavar (born 1965); Acting	29 April 2014	31 March 2015	336 days	SDP BiH
5	Dragan Mektić	Dragan Mektić (born 1956)	31 March 2015	23 December 2019	4 years, 267 days	SDS
4	Fahrudin Radončić	Fahrudin Radončić (born 1957)	23 December 2019	2 June 2020	162 days	SBB
—	Nedeljko Jović	Nedeljko Jović (born 1984); Acting	2 June 2020	23 July 2020	51 days	SP
6	Selmo Cikotić	Selmo Cikotić (born 1964)	23 July 2020	25 January 2023	2 years, 186 days	SDA
7	Nenad Nešić	Nenad Nešić (born 1978)	25 January 2023	23 January 2025	1 year, 364 days	DNS
—	Ivica Bošnjak	Ivica Bošnjak (born 1965); Acting	23 January 2025	Incumbent	1 year, 271 days	HDZ BiH
