= Greece–Bosnia and Herzegovina Friendship Building =

Office building in Sarajevo, Bosnia and Herzegovina

- Zgrada prijateljstva između Grčke i Bosne i Hercegovine; Зграда пријатељства између Грчке и Босне и Херцеговине
- The reconstructed Greece–Bosnia and Herzegovina Friendship Building in 2012
- Interactive map of the Greece–Bosnia and Herzegovina Friendship Building area

General information
- Type: Office tower, Government building
- Location: Sarajevo, Bosnia and Herzegovina, TRG BiH 1, Sarajevo 71000, Bosna i Hercegovina
- Coordinates: 43°51′18.13″N 18°24′18.63″E
- Completed: 1974; 52 years ago (initial construction); 2007 (reconstruction)
- Owner: Council of Ministers of Bosnia and Herzegovina

Technical details
- Floor count: 21

Design and construction
- Main contractor: Vranica d.d. (original construction); Domotechniki S.A. (reconstruction)

The Greece–Bosnia and Herzegovina Friendship Building (Serbo-Croatian: Zgrada prijateljstva između Grčke i Bosne i Hercegovine, Зграда пријатељства између Грчке и Босне и Херцеговине, Greek: Κτήριο Φιλίας Ελλάδας Βοσνίας-Ερζεγοβίνης) is a government office building in Sarajevo, Bosnia and Herzegovina. The building houses the Council of Ministers of Bosnia and Herzegovina. It is often erroneously referred to as the Parliament Building because of its close proximity to the actual five-story parliament building which is adjacent to the Greek–Bosnian Friendship Building.

== History ==
The building was completed in 1974 during the Yugoslav period, and occupied by the government of the Socialist Republic of Bosnia and Herzegovina. It was originally named the Executive Council Building (Zgrada Izvršnog Vijeća). It served as the principal government building in Bosnia and Herzegovina until it was extensively damaged by Serb shelling in May 1992 in the first few weeks of the Siege of Sarajevo, during the Bosnian War. After the end of the war, the building was gutted and remained vacant until reconstruction began in 2006.

== Reconstruction ==
In 2006, the government of Greece provided 80.4% of the funding for the reconstruction of the building. The total cost of the project was €17,057,316. Reconstruction was completed by the Greek company Domotechniki SA in just over one year, and the building was inaugurated on 23 July 2007 by Prime Minister of Greece Kostas Karamanlis and the collective presidents of Bosnia.
