= Bosnian-Herzegovinian Greens =

Political party in Bosnia and Herzegovina

Bosnian-Herzegovinian Greens Bosanskohercegovački Zeleni
- President: Sevlid Hurtić
- Founded: 2 March 2022
- Headquarters: Srpskih sokolova 11, Doboj
- Ideology: Green politics; Pro-Europeanism
- Political position: Centre to centre-left
- HoR BiH: 0 / 42
- HoP BiH: 0 / 15
- HoR FBiH: 0 / 98
- HoP FBiH: 0 / 80
- NA RS: 1 / 83

Website
- bhzeleni.ba

The Bosnian-Herzegovinian Greens (Bosnian: Bosanskohercegovački Zeleni; abbr. BH Zeleni; BHZ) is a green political party in Bosnia and Herzegovina. It was founded on 2 March 2022.

== History ==
The Bosnian-Herzegovinian Greens was founded on 2 March 2022 by Sevlid Hurtić, who became the new party's president.

In the 2022 general election, the party contested all levels of government except for the Presidency, gaining one seat in the National Assembly of Republika Srpska. Following the 2022 general election, a coalition led by the Alliance of Independent Social Democrats, the Croatian Democratic Union and the Social Democratic Party, including the Bosnian-Herzegovinian Greens, reached an agreement on the formation of a new government.

== Election results ==
=== Parliamentary elections ===
Parliamentary Assembly of Bosnia and Herzegovina
Year	#	Popular vote	%	HoR	Seat change	HoP	Seat change	Government
2022	26th	3,394	0.21	0 / 42	New	0 / 15	New	Extra-parliamentary
2026	21st	8,359	0.62	0 / 42	0	0 / 15	0	Extra-parliamentary
