= Court of Bosnia and Herzegovina =

Supreme court of Bosnia and Herzegovina

- Serbo-Croatian: Sud Bosne i Hercegovine; Cyrillic: Суд Босне и Херцеговине
- Logo of the Court of BiH which is also the coat of arms of the State of Bosnia and Herzegovina.
- Interactive map of Court of Bosnia and Herzegovina
- 43°50′41″N 18°22′00″E
- Established: 3 July 2002
- Location: Kraljice Jelene street, Sarajevo, Bosnia and Herzegovina
- Coordinates: 43°50′41″N 18°22′00″E

President
- Currently: Minka Kreho (acting)
- Since: 21 December 2023

The Court of Bosnia and Herzegovina (Serbo-Croatian: Sud Bosne i Hercegovine, Суд Босне и Херцеговине; abbreviated as the Court of BiH in English) is the highest ordinary court of Bosnia and Herzegovina. It was established on 3 July 2002 by the Parliament of Bosnia and Herzegovina with the Law on the Court of BiH, promulgated on 12 November 2000 by the High Representative for Bosnia and Herzegovina. The Constitutional Court of Bosnia and Herzegovina ruled out attempts by the Republika Srpska Government to remove the Court's jurisdiction in Republika Srpska, one of the two entities of Bosnia and Herzegovina.

The Court of Bosnia and Herzegovina, which is based in Sarajevo (88 Kraljice Jelene Street), was necessary to provide for judicial protection in the matters that under the Constitution of Bosnia and Herzegovina fall under the jurisdiction of the Court of BiH, such as the fight against terrorism, war crimes, human trafficking, organized and economic crimes.

The Court is a judicial body which does not have a time-limited mandate. Unlike the International Criminal Tribunal for the Former Yugoslavia (ICTY) whose work is regulated by the Statute issued by the UN Security Council and the Rulebook adopted by the ICTY judges, the Court of BiH hands down verdicts per the laws of the State of Bosnia and Herzegovina, such as the BiH Criminal Code and the BiH Criminal Procedure Code. Besides the fact that the international judges and prosecutors worked at the Court of BiH and the Prosecutor's Office of BiH (until 2009), the citizens of Bosnia and Herzegovina hold the key functions. Trials are conducted in one of the official languages of BiH per the national laws, while the convicted persons serve their time in prisons in BiH.

== Competencies of the Court of BiH ==
The competencies of the Court of BiH are regulated by the Law on the Court of BiH and are related to criminal, administrative and appellate jurisdiction. Within its criminal jurisdiction, the Court of BiH tries cases on the crimes laid down by the laws of BiH, which include war crimes, organized crime, economic crime and corruption cases.

Administrative jurisdiction means that the Court of BiH adjudicates cases on the decisions issued by BiH institutions and other organizations in charge of public functions, such as property disputes related to the performance of public functions between the States and the Political divisions of Bosnia and Herzegovina, breaches of the election law, and others.

However, the Court of BiH does not entertain appeals against decisions issued by Political divisions of Bosnia and Herzegovina courts.

== Divisions and sections ==
There are three Divisions within the Court of BiH: Criminal, Administrative and Appellate. The Criminal Division contains: Section I – War Crimes Chamber; Section II – Organized Crime, Economic Crime and Corruption and Section III – General Crime.

The Appellate Division rules on appeals against decisions made within the Criminal and Administrative divisions, decides on complaints related to the breaches of the Election Law, as well as in other cases as provided by the laws of BiH.

The Common Secretariat provides administrative support to the General Crime Section and the Administrative Division. The role of the Registry is to provide the Court of BiH with the conditions for its efficient work by rendering administrative support to Sections I and II for War Crimes and Organized Crime.

== The President of the Court and his/her role ==
The High Judicial and Prosecutorial Council appoints the President of the Court of BiH. The President of the Court of BiH is one of the Judges appointed to the Court of BiH, who must possess the required managerial and organizational skills important for the work of the Court of BiH. President is appointed to a mandate of six (6) years and can be reappointed.

The responsibilities of the President of the Court are regulated by the Law on the Court of BiH and internal acts of the Court. President of the Court, inter alia, has the following responsibilities:

- representing the Court of BiH in relations with the state-level bodies and organizations;
- assignment of judges to Divisions and Chambers;
- appointing replacements for judges in cases of recusal/disqualification of judges;
- scheduling Plenum sessions, management of cases and assignment of cases among members of the Court of BiH, and if necessary assigning the Division/Section in charge;
- convening and chairing the Plenum of the Court of BiH;
- Court of BiH budget execution;
- managing the staff of the Court of BiH.

== Appointment of the judges ==
According to the Law, the High Judicial and Prosecutorial Council appoints Judges including the President of the Court of BiH, lay judges and additional judges to the Court of BiH. The HJPC advertises job vacancies and then decides on the appointment.

== Appointment of international judges and prosecutors ==
The Registry manages the process of appointing and engaging international judges who are appointed to Section I and Section II of the Criminal and Appeal divisions, as well as international prosecutors who are appointed to the Special Departments.

After a joint recommendation of the President of the Court of BiH and the President of the High Judicial and Prosecutorial Council, the High Representative appoints international judges. International judges and prosecutors are appointed by the High Representative by the powers vested in him by Article 5, Annex 10, of the Dayton Peace Accord.

== The Registry ==
The Registry of the Court of Bosnia and Herzegovina (Bosnian: Ured registrara) was established on 1 December 2004 for five years through an "Agreement between the High Representative for Bosnia and Herzegovina and Bosnia and Herzegovina on the Establishment of the Registry for Section I for War Crimes and Section II for Organized Crime, Economic Crime and Corruption of the Criminal and Appellate Divisions of the Court of Bosnia and Herzegovina and the Special Department for War Crimes and the Special Department for Organized Crime, Economic Crime and Corruption of the Prosecutor's Office of Bosnia and Herzegovina".

The mandate of the Registry is to manage and provide administrative, legal and other support services to Section I for War Crimes and Section II for Organized Crime, Economic Crime and Corruption of the Criminal and Appellate Divisions of the Court of Bosnia and Herzegovina as well as to provide support services to Special Departments of the Prosecutor's Office.

== Common Secretariat ==
The Common Secretariat is responsible for the administration and the provision of support services to Section III of the Criminal and Appellate Divisions and the Administrative Division. The Common Secretariat is managed by a Chief Registrar, assisted by two officers.

The Common Secretariat includes the "Department for legal, general, administrative and technical support affairs", the "Department for financial-material affairs", and the "Court Sections Legal Support Service".
