= 2006 in Bosnia and Herzegovina =

- Decades: 1980s; 1990s; 2000s; 2010s; 2020s
- See also: Other events of 2006; Timeline of Bosnian and Herzegovinian history

The following lists events that happened during the year 2006 in Bosnia and Herzegovina.

== Incumbents ==
- Presidency:
  - Sulejman Tihić (until November 6), Haris Silajdžić (starting November 6)
  - Ivo Miro Jović (until November 6), Željko Komšić (starting November 6)
  - Borislav Paravac (until November 6), Nebojša Radmanović (starting November 6)
- Prime Minister: Adnan Terzić

== Events ==
=== February ===
- February 8 - Muslims in Sarajevo organized a protest against the Muhammad cartoons. They delivered a letter demanding an apology for the publication of the cartoons to staff at the Danish, Norwegian and French embassies. The flags of Norway, Denmark and Croatia were burnt.

=== October ===
- October 1 - 2006 Bosnian general election took place.
