= 2003 in Bosnia and Herzegovina =

- Decades: 1980s; 1990s; 2000s; 2010s; 2020s
- See also: Other events of 2003; Timeline of Bosnian and Herzegovinian history

The following lists events that happened during the year 2003 in Bosnia and Herzegovina.

== Incumbents ==
- Presidency:
  - Sulejman Tihić
  - Dragan Čović
  - Mirko Šarović (until April 2), Borislav Paravac (starting April 2)
- Prime Minister: Adnan Terzić

== Deaths ==
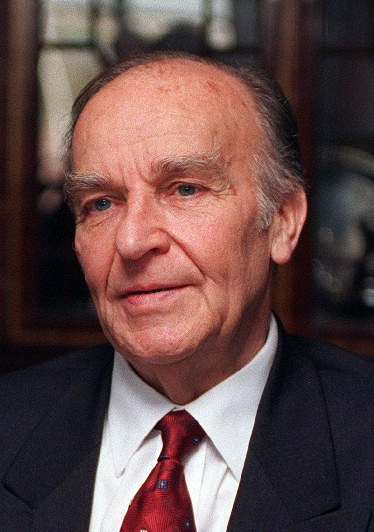
Alija Izetbegović

=== October ===
- 19 October – Alija Izetbegović, politician, member and chairman of the Presidency (b. 1925).
