= 2005 in Bosnia and Herzegovina =

- Decades: 1980s; 1990s; 2000s; 2010s; 2020s
- See also: Other events of 2005; Timeline of Bosnian and Herzegovinian history

The following lists events that happened during the year 2005 in Bosnia and Herzegovina.

== Incumbents ==
- Presidency:
  - Sulejman Tihić
  - Dragan Čović (until May 9), Ivo Miro Jović (starting May 9)
  - Borislav Paravac
- Prime Minister: Adnan Terzić
