= 2004 in Bosnia and Herzegovina =

- Decades: 1980s; 1990s; 2000s; 2010s; 2020s
- See also: Other events of 2004; Timeline of Bosnian and Herzegovinian history

The following lists events that happened during 2004 in Bosnia and Herzegovina.

== Incumbents ==
- Presidency:
  - Sulejman Tihić
  - Dragan Čović
  - Borislav Paravac
- Prime Minister: Adnan Terzić

== Events ==
=== February ===
- February 26 - The President of the Republic of Macedonia Boris Trajkovski died in an airplane accident in Bosnia and Herzegovina.
