= 2007 in Bosnia and Herzegovina =

- Decades: 1980s; 1990s; 2000s; 2010s; 2020s
- See also: Other events of 2007; Timeline of Bosnian and Herzegovinian history

Events from the year 2007 in Bosnia and Herzegovina

== Incumbents ==
- Presidency:
  - Haris Silajdžić
  - Željko Komšić
  - Nebojša Radmanović
- Prime Minister: Adnan Terzić (until January 11), Nikola Špirić (starting January 11)

== Events ==
=== January ===
- January 10: Mirsad Bektašević, a 19-year-old Swedish citizen of Bosnian descent, is convicted of terrorism-related charges by a court in Sarajevo and sentenced to 15 years' imprisonment.

=== February ===
- February 20: NATO troops in Bosnia-Herzegovina carry out early morning raids on the houses of the children of convicted war criminal Radovan Karadžić.
- February 26: The International Court of Justice finds Serbia guilty of failing to prevent genocide in the Srebrenica massacre, but clears it of direct responsibility and complicity in a case brought forth by Bosnia and Herzegovina.
- February 28: The European Union announces plans to make significant cuts to the European Union Force in Bosnia-Herzegovina.

=== March ===
- March 24: The United Kingdom announces the withdrawal of all British Armed Forces serving as part of the European Union Force in Bosnia and Herzegovina.

=== April ===
- April 10: Serbia's war crimes court has jailed four Serb paramilitaries who were filmed as they shot dead six captured young Bosnian Muslims.

=== June ===
- June 28: UNESCO designates 22 new World Heritage Sites, including Sydney Opera House, Canada's Rideau Canal, Japan's Iwami Ginzan Silver Mine, Turkmenistan's Parthian Fortresses of Nisa, India's Red Fort complexes, the Lope-Okanda Landscape of Gabon, the Richtersveld desert of South Africa, the rock carvings of Twyfelfontein in Namibia, the fortified tower houses of Guangdong Province in the People's Republic of China, Teide National Park in the Canary Islands, Spain, ancient beech forests of Central Europe, Mehmed Paša Sokolović Bridge in Bosnia and Herzegovina, Bordeaux and the Port de la Lune in France, the Old Town of Corfu in Greece, the Palace of Galerius in Gamzigrad-Romuliana in Serbia.

=== August ===
- August 29: The Red Cross reports that at least 17,000 are still missing from the former Yugoslavia, including 13,400 from the Bosnian wars, 2,300 from the Croatian conflict and 2,047 from the Kosovo conflict.

== Deaths ==
- May 19: Miroslav Deronjić, 52, politician and convicted war criminal, natural causes.
- September 2: Safet Isović, 71, singer.
- September 30: Milan Jelić, 51, politician, president of Republika Srpska entity (2006–2007), heart attack.
