= 2012 in Bosnia and Herzegovina =

- Decades: 1990s; 2000s; 2010s; 2020s
- See also: Other events of 2012; Timeline of Bosnian and Herzegovinian history

The following lists events that happened during the year 2012 in Bosnia and Herzegovina.

== Incumbents ==
- Presidency:
  - Bakir Izetbegović
  - Željko Komšić
  - Nebojša Radmanović
- Prime Minister: Nikola Špirić (until January 12), Vjekoslav Bevanda (starting January 12)

== Events ==
=== January ===
- January 22 - Police in Bosnia and Herzegovina recapture Bosnian Serb fugitive Radovan Stanković after he escaped from prison five years ago.

=== February ===
- February 5 - Bosnia and Herzegovina declares a state of emergency as a result of the cold snap.

=== July ===
- July 11 - 520 men and boys killed in the Srebrenica massacre in 1995 are buried in Potočari.

=== September ===
- September 12 - Police in Bosnia and Herzegovina arrest 25 people on suspicion of multiple murders, drug-trafficking and robbery in the biggest crackdown on organised crime since the Bosnian War.

=== December ===
- December 13 - Former Bosnian intelligence chief Zdravko Tolimir, believed to be a top aide to Ratko Mladić, is sentenced to life imprisonment by ICTY for his role in the Srebrenica massacre.
