= 2010 in Bosnia and Herzegovina =

- Decades: 1990s; 2000s; 2010s; 2020s
- See also: Other events of 2010; Timeline of Bosnian and Herzegovinian history

The following lists events that happened during 2010 in Bosnia and Herzegovina.

== Incumbents ==
- Presidency:
  - Haris Silajdžić (until November 10), Bakir Izetbegović (starting November 10)
  - Željko Komšić
  - Nebojša Radmanović
- Prime Minister: Nikola Špirić

== Events ==
=== March ===
- March 1 - 63-year-old former President of the Federation of Bosnia and Herzegovina Ejup Ganić is detained at London Heathrow Airport while trying to leave the UK to escape charges of war crimes.
- March 11 - Ejup Ganić is released on bail on "stringent" conditions by the British High Court.

=== April ===
- April 21 - Bosnian police fired tear gas and water at war veterans in Sarajevo, during a protest against proposed state benefit cuts.
- April 22 - NATO foreign ministers agree to launch a Membership Action Plan for Bosnia and Herzegovina.

=== August ===
- August 11 - Corpses of more than 50 people are unearthed in Perućac lake on the border between Bosnia and Herzegovina and Serbia by investigators looking for people who were killed during the Bosnian War.

=== October ===
- October 12 - 2010 Bosnian general election took place.
