= 2014 in Bosnia and Herzegovina =

- Decades: 1990s; 2000s; 2010s; 2020s
- See also: Other events of 2014; Timeline of Bosnian and Herzegovinian history

Events in the year 2014 in Bosnia and Herzegovina.

== Incumbents ==
- President: Bakir Izetbegović, Nebojša Radmanović, and Željko Komšić (until November 17) Bakir Izetbegović, Mladen Ivanić, and Dragan Čović (from November 17)
- Prime Minister: Vjekoslav Bevanda

== Events ==
- 4 February – 2014 unrest in Bosnia and Herzegovina began.
- 7 February – After days of rioting in Bosnia, the presidency building in Sarajevo is attacked.
- 13 May – 2014 Southeast Europe floods hit the country.
- 16 May – Tens of thousands of people are being evacuated in Serbia and Bosnia as heavy rains cause floods.
- 28 June – Sarajevo commemorates the 100th anniversary of the assassination of Archduke Franz Ferdinand of Austria that led to World War I.
- 12 October – 2014 Bosnian general election took place.

== Deaths ==
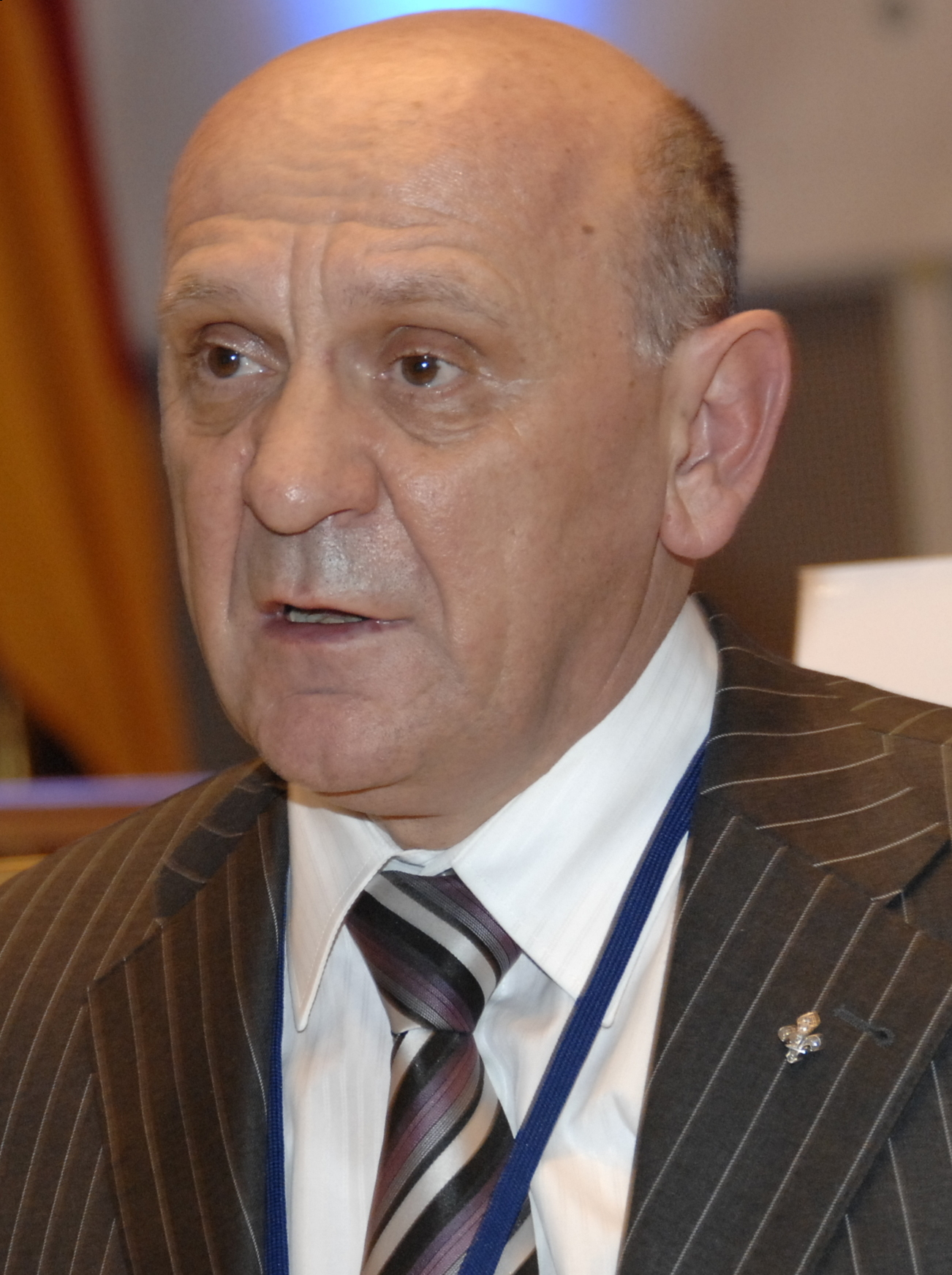
Sulejman Tihić

=== September ===
- 25 September – Sulejman Tihić, politician, member and chairman of the Presidency (b. 1951).
