= 2013 in Bosnia and Herzegovina =

- Decades: 1990s; 2000s; 2010s; 2020s
- See also: Other events of 2013; Timeline of Bosnian and Herzegovinian history

The following lists events that happened during the year 2013 in Bosnia and Herzegovina.

== Incumbents ==
- Presidency:
  - Bakir Izetbegović
  - Željko Komšić
  - Nebojša Radmanović
- Prime Minister: Vjekoslav Bevanda

== Events ==
=== February ===
- February 28 - The war crime convictions of Momčilo Perišić are overturned by a war crimes tribunal in The Hague, Netherlands. The Serbian general had been convicted and sentenced in 2011 for atrocities perpetrated both during wars in Croatia and Bosnia.

=== March ===
- March 29 - A Bosnian court sentences Veselin Vlahović to 45 years in jail for murders, tortures, rapes and lootings during the Bosnian War.

=== May ===
- May 29 - Former Bosnian official Jadranko Prlić is sentenced to 25 years in prison by the International Criminal Tribunal for the former Yugoslavia for war crimes during the Yugoslav Wars.
- May 30 - After a three-year trial, a U.N. tribunal in The Hague acquits two former Serbian security officials accused of committing war crimes and crimes against humanity during the 1990s Bosnian War.

=== August ===
- August 15 - Aleksandar Cvetković is extradited to Bosnia and Herzegovina for trial regarding the 1995 Srebrenica massacre.
