= 2009 in Bosnia and Herzegovina =

- Decades: 1980s; 1990s; 2000s; 2010s; 2020s
- See also: Other events of 2009; Timeline of Bosnian and Herzegovinian history

The following lists events that happened during the year 2009 in Bosnia and Herzegovina.

== Incumbents ==
- Presidency:
  - Haris Silajdžić
  - Željko Komšić
  - Nebojša Radmanović
- Prime Minister: Nikola Špirić

== Events ==
=== October ===
- October 15 – The United Nations General Assembly elects Bosnia and Herzegovina, Brazil, Gabon, Lebanon and Nigeria to serve two-year terms on the United Nations Security Council as non-veto-holding members.

=== December ===
- December 13 – Rail service between Sarajevo and Belgrade resumes after an 18-year hiatus.

== Deaths ==
=== December ===
- 2 December – Jozo Križanović, politician, member and chairman of the Presidency (b. 1944).
