= 2002 in Bosnia and Herzegovina =

- Decades: 1980s; 1990s; 2000s; 2010s; 2020s
- See also: Other events of 2002; Timeline of Bosnian and Herzegovinian history

The following lists events that happened during the year 2002 in Bosnia and Herzegovina.

== Incumbents ==
- Presidency:
  - Beriz Belkić (until October 5), Sulejman Tihić (starting October 5)
  - Jozo Križanović (until October 5), Dragan Čović (starting October 5)
  - Živko Radišić (until October 5), Mirko Šarović (starting October 5)
- Prime Minister:
  - Zlatko Lagumdžija (until March 15)
  - Dragan Mikerević (March 15-December 23)
  - Adnan Terzić (starting December 23)

== Events ==
=== October ===
- October 5 - 2002 Bosnian general election took place.
