= 2011 in Bosnia and Herzegovina =

- Decades: 1990s; 2000s; 2010s; 2020s
- See also: Other events of 2011; Timeline of Bosnian and Herzegovinian history

The following lists events that happened during the year 2011 in Bosnia and Herzegovina.

== Incumbents ==
- Presidency:
  - Bakir Izetbegović
  - Željko Komšić
  - Nebojša Radmanović
- Prime Minister: Nikola Špirić
