= 2017 in Bosnia and Herzegovina =

- Decades: 1990s; 2000s; 2010s; 2020s
- See also: Other events of 2017; Timeline of Bosnian and Herzegovinian history

Events in the year 2017 in Bosnia and Herzegovina.

== Incumbents ==
- President – Bakir Izetbegović, Mladen Ivanić, and Dragan Čović
- Prime Minister – Denis Zvizdić

== Events ==
=== February ===
- 1 February – In Medjugorje, a group of masked hooligans interrupted a match between FK Velež Mostar and FK Sloboda Tuzla.

=== June ===
- 27 June – An appeals court in The Hague rules that Netherlands is partly to blame for the deaths of some 350 Muslim Bosnian men in the 1995 Srebrenica genocide and, in a move considered landmark, orders it to pay limited damages.

=== October ===
- 9 October – The presiding judge Šaban Maksumić of the Sarajevo Bosnian war crimes court acquits former Bosnian military officer Naser Orić of the charge of killing three Bosnian Serb prisoners of war during the Bosnian War. In July 2008, the Appeals Chamber of the International Criminal Tribunal for the former Yugoslavia in the Netherlands acquitted Orić for failing to prevent the deaths of five Bosnian Serb detainees and the mistreatment of eleven other detainees from late 1992 to early 1993.

=== November ===
- 22 November – Ratko Mladić, the former Chief of Staff of the Bosnian Serb army during the Bosnian War, is found guilty of genocide, war crimes, and crimes against humanity by the International Criminal Tribunal for the former Yugoslavia and is sentenced to life imprisonment.
