= List of heads of the Central Bosnia Canton =

Prime Minister of Central Bosnia Canton
- Premijer Srednjobosanskog kantona
- Coat of arms of Central Bosnia Canton
- Incumbent; Tahir Lendo since 10 May 2011
- Appointer: Central Bosnia Cantonal Assembly
- Inaugural holder: Ivan Šarić (as governor); Uzeir Mlivo (as prime minister)
- Formation: 28 March 1996

This is a list of heads of the Central Bosnia Canton.

== Heads of the Central Bosnia Canton (1996–present) ==
Croatian Democratic Union
Party of Democratic Action
Social Democratic Party

=== Governors ===
№	Portrait	Name (Born–Died)	Term of Office		Party
1		Ivan Šarić	28 March 1996	1997	HDZ BiH
2		Adnan Terzić (1960–)	1997	10 November 1998	SDA
3		Branko Golub (1954–)	10 November 1998	7 February 2001	HDZ BiH
4		Rudo Vidović (1958–)	7 February 2001	7 February 2002	HDZ BiH
5		Nedžad Hadžić	7 February 2002	6 October 2002	SDA

=== Prime Ministers ===
№	Portrait	Name (Born–Died)	Term of Office		Party
1		Uzeir Mlivo (1949–)	13 May 1996	19 July 1998	SDA
2		Mirko Batinić (1956–)	19 July 1998	15 January 1999	HDZ BiH
3		Zahid Mustajbegović (1954–)	15 January 1999	20 December 1999	SDP BiH
4		Zdenko Vukić (1959–)	20 December 1999	30 March 2001	HDZ BiH
5		Zdenko Antunović (1960–)	30 March 2001	4 February 2003	HDZ BiH
6		Salko Selman (1954–)	4 February 2003	10 May 2011	SDA
7		Tahir Lendo (1961–)	10 May 2011	Incumbent	SDA
