= 1997 in Bosnia and Herzegovina =

- Decades: 1970s; 1980s; 1990s; 2000s; 2010s
- See also: Other events of 1997 · Timeline of Bosnian and Herzegovinian history

The following lists events that happened during the year 1997 in Bosnia and Herzegovina.

== Incumbents ==
- Presidency:
  - Alija Izetbegović
  - Krešimir Zubak
  - Momčilo Krajišnik
- Prime Minister: Hasan Muratović (until January 3), Haris Silajdžić (starting January 3)
