= Central Bosnia Canton =

Canton in Bosnia and Herzegovina

Coordinates: 44°06′N 17°39′E

Central Bosnia Canton Srednjobosanski kanton Средњобосански кантон Kanton Središnja Bosna
- Flag Coat of arms

- Status: Canton of the Federation of Bosnia and Herzegovina
- Capital and largest city: Travnik
- Official languages: Bosnian and Croatian
- Ethnic groups (2013): 57.58% Bosniaks 38.33% Croats 1.19% Serbs 2.90% others
- Demonym: Central Bosnian
- Government: Parliamentary system
  - Prime Minister: Tahir Lendo (SDA)
  - President of Assembly: Dražen Matišić (HDZ BiH)
- Legislature: Assembly of the Central Bosnia Canton

Canton of the Federation of Bosnia and Herzegovina
  - Establishment: 12 June 1996

Area
  - Total: 3,189 km^{2} (1,231 sq mi)

Population
  - 2013 census: 254,686
  - Density: 85.65/km^{2} (221.8/sq mi)
- HDI (2023): ▲0.806 very high
- Currency: BAM
- Time zone: UTC+1 (CET)
  - Summer (DST): UTC+2 (CEST)
- Date format: dd-mm-yyyy

The Central Bosnia Canton (Bosnian: Srednjobosanski kanton/Средњобосански кантон, Croatian: Kanton Središnja Bosna; Serbian: Средњобосански кантон, romanized: Srednjobosanski kanton) is a federated state and one of ten cantons of the Federation of Bosnia and Herzegovina in Bosnia and Herzegovina.

The most populous settlement in the region is Bugojno, followed by Travnik and Novi Travnik.

== Geography ==
It is in the country's center, west of Sarajevo. The center of canton government is Travnik.

== Municipalities ==
The canton is split into the municipalities of Bugojno, Busovača, Dobretići, Donji Vakuf, Fojnica, Gornji Vakuf-Uskoplje, Jajce, Kiseljak, Kreševo, Novi Travnik, Travnik, Vitez. The region reports a GDP equitable with the average of Bosnia and Herzegovina more broadly. The region has historically benefitted from and economically relied on agriculture, trade, as well as mineral deposits. The Central Bosnia Canton is the fifth largest of ten and its share of the national population is slightly below average.

In April 2022, the United Nations Office for Disaster Risk Reduction recognized the region in a climate resilience initiative.

== Demographics ==
Ethnic groups of Una-Sana (2013 census)
1. Bosniaks (57.6%)
2. Croats (38.3%)
3. Serbs (1.19%)
4. Other groups (2.90%)

Change in the ethnic composition of the Central Bosnia Canton between the census of 1991 (pre-war) and 2013. Bosniaks (green), Serbs (blue), Croats (orange).

Of the ten cantons comprising the Federation of Bosnia and Herzegovina, Central Bosnia Canton and Herzegovina-Neretva Canton are the only ones in which neither the Bosniaks nor Croats form an absolute majority. Special legislative procedures protect the constituent ethnic groups. The Bosniaks form a majority in the municipalities of Bugojno, Jajce, Donji Vakuf, Fojnica, Gornji Vakuf-Uskoplje, Novi Travnik and Travnik. The Croats form a majority in the municipalities of Busovača, Dobretići, Kreševo, Kiseljak and Vitez.

=== 2013 Census ===
Municipality	Nationality						Total
Municipality	Bosniaks	%	Croats	%	Serbs	%	Total
Bugojno	24,650	78.32	5,767	18.32	376	1.19	31,470
Busovača	8,681	48.47	8,873	49.54	205	1.14	17,910
Dobretići	0	0	1,626	99.81	1	0.06	1,629
Donji Vakuf	13,376	95.64	58	4.18	107	0.76	13,985
Fojnica	7,592	61.44	3,664	29.65	48	0.38	12,356
Gornji Vakuf-Uskoplje	12,004	57.34	8,660	41.37	30	0.14	20,933
Jajce	13,269	48.67	12,555	46.05	501	1.83	27,258
Kiseljak	7,838	37.82	11,823	57.05	409	1.97	20,722
Kreševo	1,014	19.23	4,149	78.68	26	0.49	5,273
Novi Travnik	12,067	50.63	11,002	46.16	367	1.53	23,832
Travnik	35,648	66.65	15,102	28.23	640	1.19	53,482
Vitez	10,513	40.69	14,350	55.54	333	1.28	25,836
Canton	146,662	57.58	97,629	38.33	3,043	1.19	254,686

Page text.

Population of Central Bosnian Canton by 1991 census *
Municipalities by 1991 borders	All	Bosniaks	Croats	Serbs	Yugoslavs	Others
Travnik	70,747	31,813	26,118	7,777	3,743	1,296
Novi Travnik	30,713	11,625	12,162	4,097	2,132	697
Vitez	27,859	11,514	12,675	1,501	1,377	792
Busovača	18,879	8,451	9,093	623	510	202
Kiseljak	24,164	9,778	12,550	740	600	496
Kreševo	6,731	1,531	4,714	34	251	201
Fojnica	16,296	8,024	6,623	157	407	1,085
Gornji Vakuf/Uskoplje	25,181	14,063	10,706	110	158	144
Bugojno	46,889	19,697	16,031	8,673	1,561	927
Donji Vakuf	24,544	13,509	682	9,533	593	227
Jajce	45,007	17,380	15,811	8,663	2,496	657
New municipalities and villages (1995) added to CBC	All	Bosniaks	Croats	Serbs	Yugoslavs	Others
Municipality Dobretići (1991 part of Skender Vakuf municipality)	4,944	3	4,720	158	19	42
Vlasinje (1991 part of Mrkonjić grad municipality)	1,133	975	149	1	2	6
Kruševo Brdo II (1991 part of Kotor Varoš municipality)	399	0	0	395	1	3
New municipalities and villages (1995) removed from CBC	All	Bosniaks	Croats	Serbs	Yugoslavs	Others
Ljuša (1991 part of Donji Vakuf municipality)	172	0	0	169	3	0
Municipality Jezero (1991 part of Jajce municipality)	1,949	756	95	1,032	44	22
Municipalities by 1991 borders	All	Bosniaks	Croats	Serbs	Yugoslavs	Others
Central Bosnian Canton 1991	341,365	147,608 (43%)	131,939 (39%)	41,261 (12%)	13,805 (4%)	6,753 (2%)

- Border between two entities have also divided some settlements but the differences should be minimal. However, because of this it is not the exact data.

== See also ==
- Bugojno coal mine
- Political divisions of Bosnia and Herzegovina
- List of heads of the Central Bosnia Canton
