= 2015 in Bosnia and Herzegovina =

- Decades: 1990s; 2000s; 2010s; 2020s
- See also: Other events of 2015; Timeline of Bosnian and Herzegovinian history

Events in the year 2015 in Bosnia and Herzegovina.

== Incumbents ==
- President – Bakir Izetbegović, Mladen Ivanić, and Dragan Čović
- Prime Minister: Vjekoslav Bevanda (until March 31) Denis Zvizdić (from March 31)

== Events ==
=== January ===
- 15 January – The country made its first appearance at the World Men's Handball Championship.

=== April ===
- 27 April – A Wahhabist gunman attacked a police station in Zvornik, Republika Srpska, killing one police officer and wounding two others before being shot dead. This was the first attack of its kind in Republika Srpska while similar attacks have previously occurred in the Federation of Bosnia and Herzegovina.

=== May ===
- 6 May – The counter-terrorist campaign Operation Ruben began in Republika Srpska following a shooting in Zvornik.

=== July ===
- 8 July – Russia vetoes a UN resolution that would have condemned the July 1995 Srebrenica massacre of more than 8,000 Bosniaks as a genocide.
- 11 July – Serbian Prime Minister Aleksandar Vučić is pelted with stones and other objects as he attempts to pay respects to the victims of the Bosnian Genocide. Vučić is a former member of the Serbian Radical Party, a far right anti-Islam party.

=== November ===
- 18 November – A gunman inside a betting shop near army barracks in Rajlovac, Sarajevo, shoots dead two Bosnian Army soldiers. The gunman, identified as Salafi extremist Enes Omeragić, later commits suicide after police surround his house.
