= 1994 in Bosnia and Herzegovina =

- Decades: 1970s; 1980s; 1990s; 2000s; 2010s
- See also: Other events of 1994 · Timeline of Bosnian and Herzegovinian history

The following lists events that happened during the year 1994 in Bosnia and Herzegovina.

== Incumbents ==
- President: Alija Izetbegović
- Prime Minister: Haris Silajdžić

== Births ==
- 31 January – Dino Beširović, footballer
- 18 February – Haris Hajradinović, footballer
- 6 May – Riad Bajić, footballer
- 20 June – Haris Tabaković, footballer
