= 2001 in Bosnia and Herzegovina =

- Decades: 1980s; 1990s; 2000s; 2010s; 2020s
- See also: Other events of 2001; Timeline of Bosnian and Herzegovinian history

The following lists events that happened during the year 2001 in Bosnia and Herzegovina.

== Incumbents ==
- Presidency:
  - Halid Genjac (until March 30), Beriz Belkić (starting March 30)
  - Ante Jelavić (until March 7), Jozo Križanović (starting March 7)
  - Živko Radišić
- Prime Minister:
  - until February 22: Martin Raguž
  - February 22-July 18: Božidar Matić
  - starting July 18: Zlatko Lagumdžija
