= 1995 in Bosnia and Herzegovina =

- Decades: 1970s; 1980s; 1990s; 2000s; 2010s
- See also: Other events of 1995 · Timeline of Bosnian and Herzegovinian history

The following lists events that happened during the year 1995 in Bosnia and Herzegovina.

== Incumbents ==
- President: Alija Izetbegović
- Prime Minister: Haris Silajdžić

== Events ==
=== July ===
- July 11 - Srebrenica massacre occurred during the Bosnian War.

=== December ===
- December 14 - end to the Bosnian War (started April 6, 1992).
