= 2000 in Bosnia and Herzegovina =

- Decades: 1980s; 1990s; 2000s; 2010s; 2020s
- See also: Other events of 2000; Timeline of Bosnian and Herzegovinian history

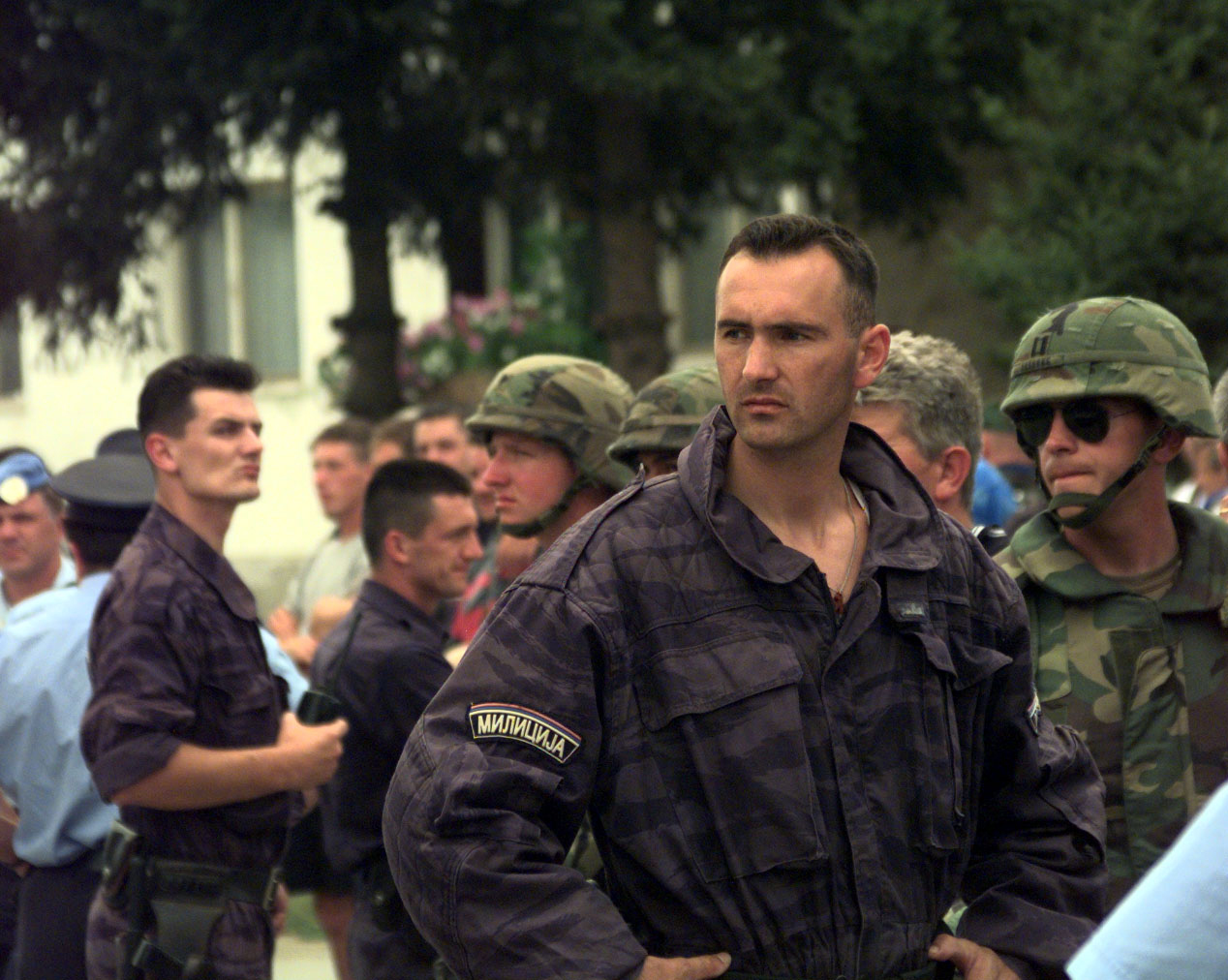
Republic of Srpska Special Police and soldiers from the 3rd Squadron, 3rd Armored Cavalry Regiment provide security in downtown Bratunac as local residents jeer at buses carrying the Women of Srebrenica to a memorial ceremony in Potocari during Operation Gallant Vigil, on July 11, 2000.

The following lists events that happened during 2000 in Bosnia and Herzegovina.

== Incumbents ==
- Presidency:
  - Alija Izetbegović (until October 14), Halid Genjac (starting October 14)
  - Ante Jelavić
  - Živko Radišić
- Prime Minister:
  - until June 6: Haris Silajdžić
  - June 6-October 18: Spasoje Tuševljak
  - starting October 18: Martin Raguž

== Events ==
=== November ===
- November 11 - Bosnian parliamentary election, 2000
