= 1996 in Bosnia and Herzegovina =

- Decades: 1970s; 1980s; 1990s; 2000s; 2010s
- See also: Other events of 1996 · Timeline of Bosnian and Herzegovinian history

The following lists events that happened during the year 1996 in Bosnia and Herzegovina.

== Incumbents ==
- Presidency:
  - Alija Izetbegovic
  - Krešimir Zubak
  - Momčilo Krajišnik
- Prime Minister: Haris Silajdžić (until January 30), Hasan Muratović (starting January 30)

== Events ==
=== September ===
- September 14 – 1996 Bosnian general election took place.
