= 1999 in Bosnia and Herzegovina =

- Decades: 1970s; 1980s; 1990s; 2000s; 2010s
- See also: Other events of 1999; Timeline of Bosnian and Herzegovinian history

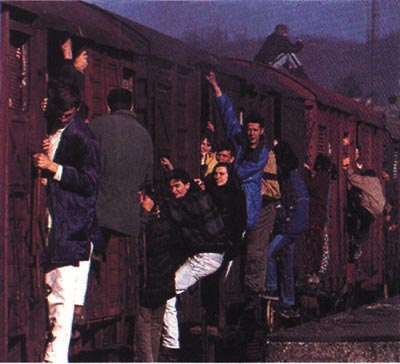

The following lists events that happened during 1999 in Bosnia and Herzegovina.

== Incumbents ==
- Presidency:
  - Alija Izetbegović
  - Ante Jelavić
  - Živko Radišić
- Prime Minister: Haris Silajdžić

== Events ==
=== December ===
- December 30 - Several areas in the northeast are declared a disaster zone when melting snow causes flooding and landslides.
