= 1992 in Bosnia and Herzegovina =

- Decades: 1970s; 1980s; 1990s; 2000s; 2010s
- See also: Other events of 1992 · Timeline of Bosnian and Herzegovinian history

Political poster in 1992 Bosnia and Herzegovina, claiming the "continuity" of the Republic of Bosnia and Herzegovina with the previous polities back to the Middle Ages.

The following lists events that happened during the year 1992 in Bosnia and Herzegovina.

== Incumbents ==
- President: Alija Izetbegović
- Prime Minister: Jure Pelivan (until November 9), Mile Akmadžić (starting November 9)

== Events ==
=== January ===
- January 9 - Bosnian Serbs declare their own republic within Bosnia and Herzegovina, in protest of the decision by Bosniaks and Bosnian Croats to seek EC recognition.

=== March ===
- March 1 - The first victims of the Bosnian War are a Serb groom's father and an Orthodox priest in a Sarajevo shooting.

=== April ===
- April 5 - Bosnian War
  - The Assembly of Bosnia and Herzegovina (without the presence of Serb political delegates) proclaims independence from the Socialist Federal Republic of Yugoslavia.
  - Serb troops, following a mass rebellion of Serbs in Bosnia and Herzegovina against the Bosnian declaration of independence from Yugoslavia, besiege the city of Sarajevo.
- April 7 - The United States and the European Community recognize the independence of Bosnia and Herzegovina.
