= 1998 in Bosnia and Herzegovina =

- Decades: 1970s; 1980s; 1990s; 2000s; 2010s
- See also: Other events of 1998; Timeline of Bosnian and Herzegovinian history

The following lists events that happened during the year 1998 in Bosnia and Herzegovina.

== Incumbents ==
- Presidency:
  - Alija Izetbegović
  - Krešimir Zubak (until November 15), Ante Jelavić (starting November 15)
  - Momčilo Krajišnik (until October 13), Živko Radišić (starting October 13)
- Prime Minister: Haris Silajdžić

== Events ==
=== September ===
- September 12 and 13 - 1998 Bosnian general election took place.
