= 2016 in Bosnia and Herzegovina =

- Decades: 1990s; 2000s; 2010s; 2020s
- See also: Other events of 2016; Timeline of Bosnian and Herzegovinian history

Events in the year 2016 in Bosnia and Herzegovina.

== Incumbents ==
- President – Bakir Izetbegović, Mladen Ivanić, and Dragan Čović
- Prime Minister – Denis Zvizdić

== Events ==
=== February ===
- 15 February – Bosnia and Herzegovina formally applies to join the European Union.

=== March ===
- 24 March – Judges at the International Criminal Tribunal for the former Yugoslavia find former President of the Republika Srpska Radovan Karadžić guilty of committing genocide and crimes against humanity in Bosnia during the Bosnian War and is sentenced to 40 years in prison. Karadžić is found to be "criminally responsible" for the Srebrenica massacre.
- 31 March – Former Deputy Prime Minister of Serbia and nationalist politician, Vojislav Šešelj, is acquitted of all nine charges of committing atrocities in Bosnia and Croatia during the early 1990s by the International Criminal Tribunal for the former Yugoslavia.

=== June ===
- 30 June – The country officially releases its first census report since the end of the Bosnian War after multiple delays, showing that the country had lost one fifth of its population from 4.4 million to 3.5 million between then and 2013.

=== July ===
- 11 July – The 127 people who were massacred in the Srebrenica massacre in 1995 and were subsequently discovered in mass graves are buried at the Srebrenica Genocide Memorial following a funeral. For the first time, Bosnian Serbs were not welcome to attend the ceremony.

=== August ===
- 5 – 21 August – The country competed at the 2016 Summer Olympics in the nation's seventh consecutive appearance at the Summer Olympics. A total of 11 athletes represented the country in athletics, judo, shooting, swimming, and tennis.

=== September ===
- 20 September – The European Union's 28 member states formally accept the country's membership application. The European Commission later must determine whether the country meets the criteria to join the union, a process that is expected to take a year.

=== October ===
- 2 October – In municipal elections, 30,000 candidates competed in the election for 2,835 local councillors, 301 city councillors, 131 municipal mayors and 12 city mayors.

== Deaths ==
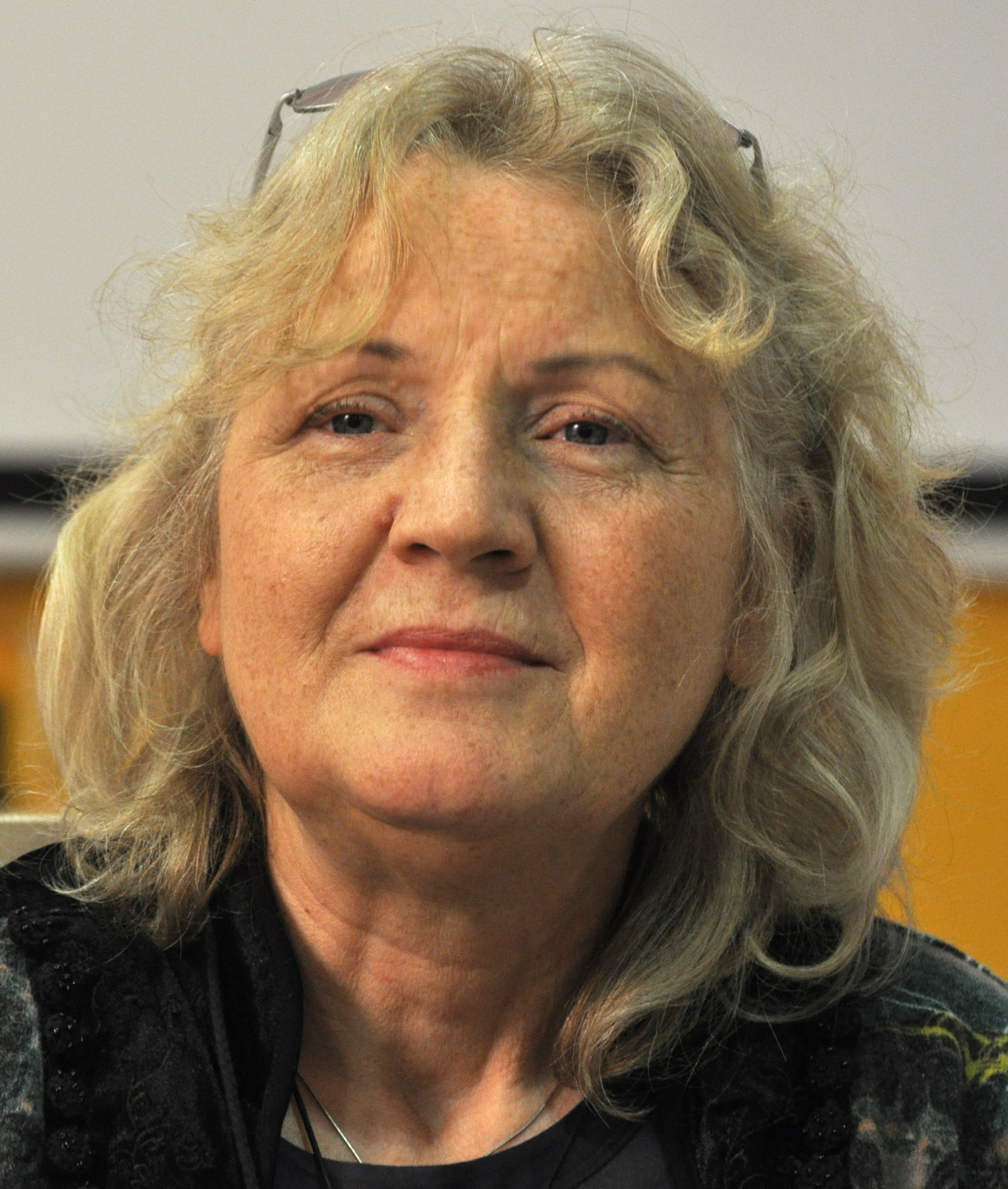
Jadranka Stojaković

- 16 February – Srđan Dizdarević, diplomat and journalist (b. 1952).
- 20 February – Muhamed Mujić, footballer (b. 1933).
- 3 May – Jadranka Stojaković, singer-songwriter (b. 1950).
- 12 May – Božidar Matić, politician (b. 1937).
- 8 August – Željko Kopanja, newspaper editor (b. 1954).
- 30 August – Josip Bukal, footballer (b. 1945).
