= 1993 in Bosnia and Herzegovina =

- Decades: 1970s; 1980s; 1990s; 2000s; 2010s
- See also: Other events of 1993 · Timeline of Bosnian and Herzegovinian history

The following lists events that happened during the year 1993 in Bosnia and Herzegovina.

== Incumbents ==
- President: Alija Izetbegović
- Prime Minister: Mile Akmadžić (until October 25), Haris Silajdžić (starting October 25)

== Deaths ==
- 24 October – Bahrija Nuri Hadžić, opera singer (born 1904)
