= 2018 in Bosnia and Herzegovina =

- Decades: 1990s; 2000s; 2010s; 2020s
- See also: Other events of 2018; Timeline of Bosnian and Herzegovinian history

Events in the year 2018 in Bosnia and Herzegovina.

== Incumbents ==
- Presidency of Bosnia and Herzegovina:
    - Bakir Izetbegović
    - Mladen Ivanić
    - Dragan Čović (until 20 November)
    - Milorad Dodik
    - Šefik Džaferović
    - Željko Komšić onwards
- Chairman of the Council of Ministers: Denis Zvizdić

== Events ==
=== April ===
- 23 April – Radovan Karadžić starts his appeal against his conviction for genocide and other wartime crimes at the UN court at The Hague.
- 24 April – Italian police arrest a Bosnian driver driving a van loaded with weapons bound for Barcelona.

=== May ===
- 8 May – Bosnian prosecutors appeal the acquittal of Naser Orić, former commander of the Bosnian Army in Srebrenica, who was accused of killing Serb prisoners.

=== October ===
- 7 October – General elections were held in the country for the national Presidency, House of Representatives, and government positions in Republika Srpska and the Federation of Bosnia and Herzegovina. Milorad Dodik, Šefik Džaferović and Željko Komšić won the presidential posts.

=== November ===
- 21 November – Kosovo puts a 100% trade tariff on all goods imported from Bosnia and Herzegovina and Serbia. The European Union says this is a "clear violation" of the Central European Free Trade Agreement.

== Deaths ==
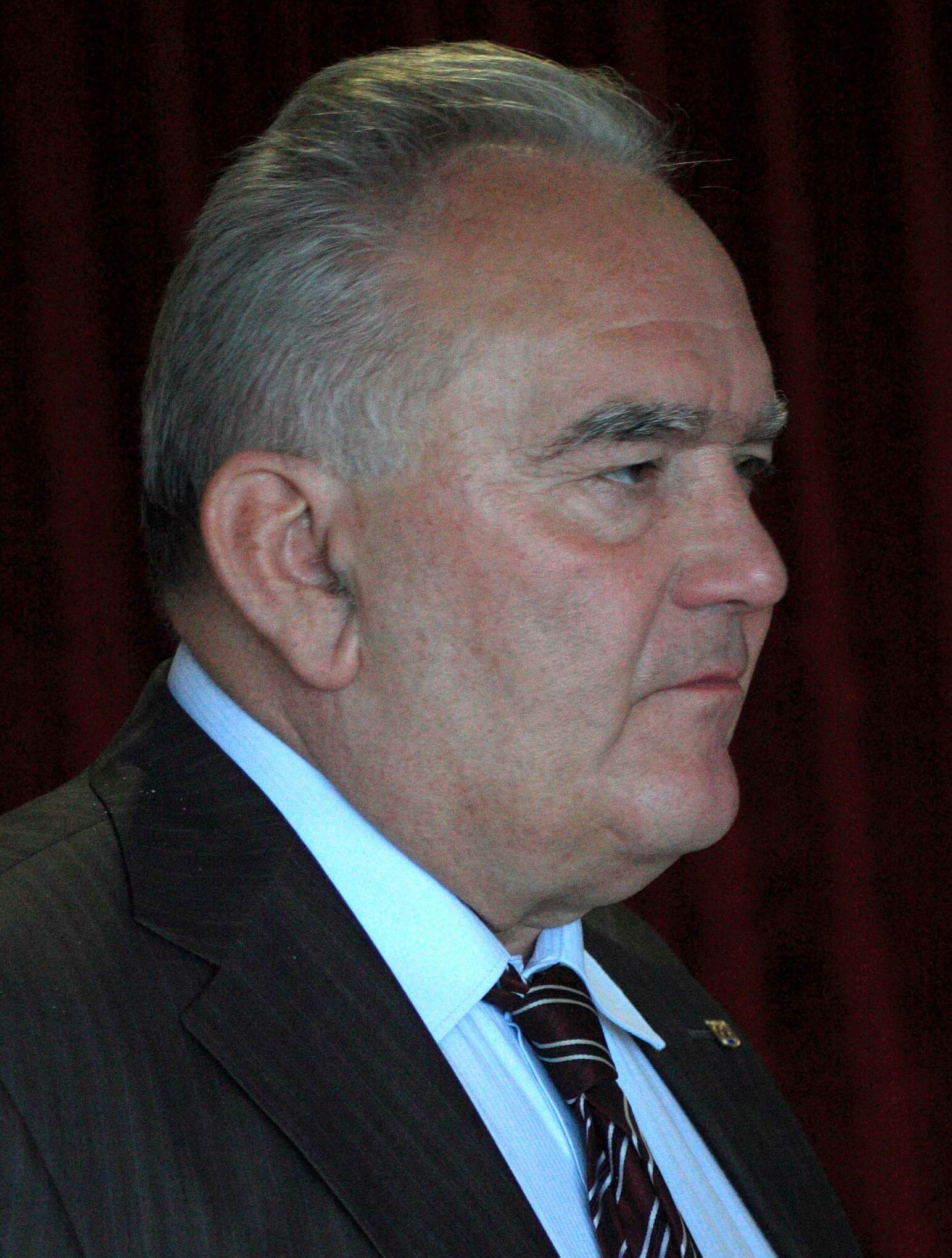
Alija Behmen

- 18 February – Nazif Mujić, actor (b. 1970).
- 3 March – Sabit Hadžić, basketball player and coach (b. 1957).
- 30 March – Sabahudin Kurt, folk and pop singer (b. 1935).
- 1 August – Alija Behmen, politician, mayor of Sarajevo (b. 1940).
- 4 August – Marijan Beneš, boxer (b. 1951).
