= Kostajnica, Doboj =

Kostajnica Костајница
- Village
- Location within Bosnia and Herzegovina
- Coordinates: 44°44′48″N 18°06′25″E
- Country: Bosnia and Herzegovina
- Entity: Republika Srpska
- Municipality: Doboj

Population (1991)
  - Total: 1,342
- Time zone: UTC+1 (CET)
  - Summer (DST): UTC+2 (CEST)

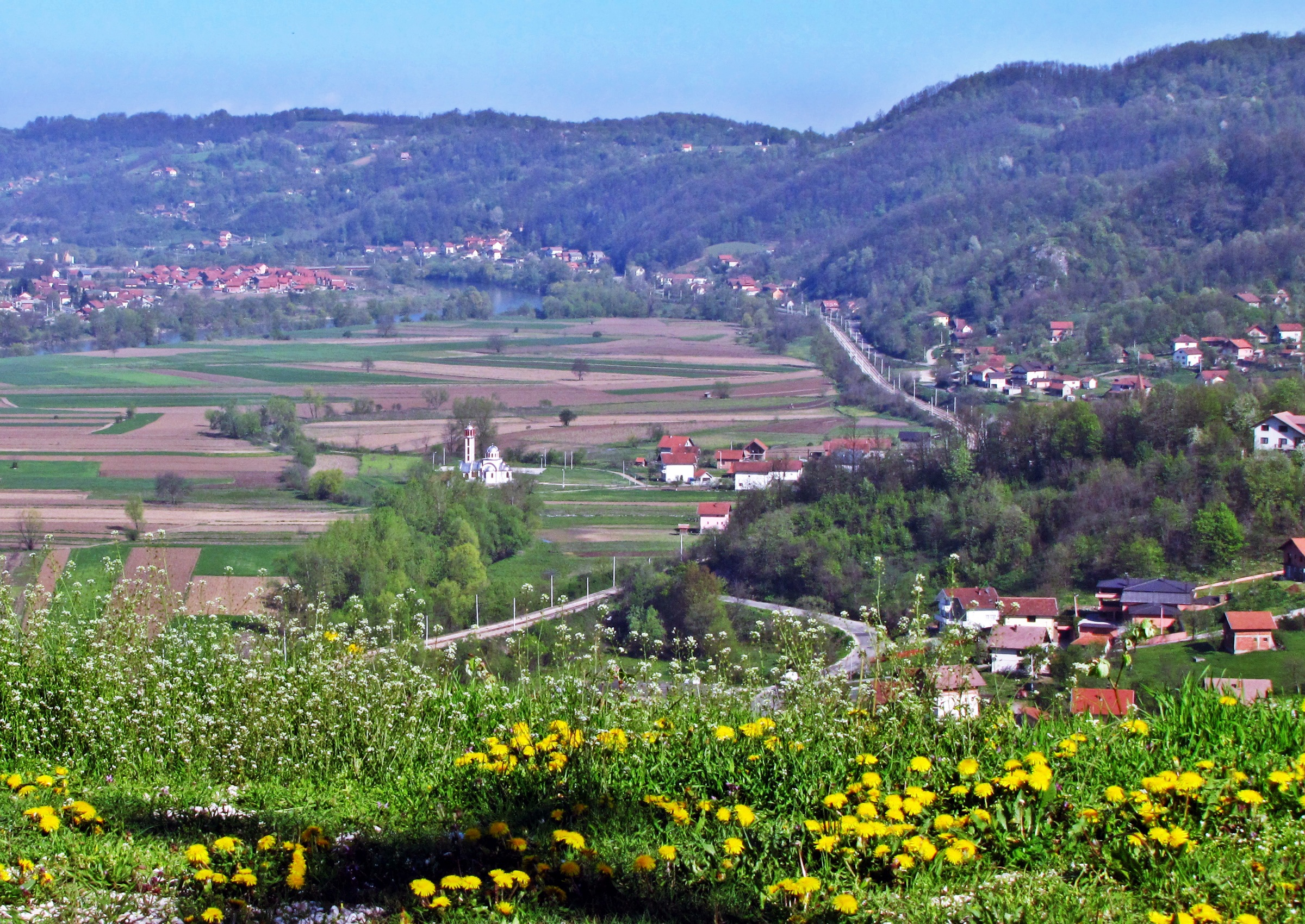

Kostajnica (Cyrillic: Костајница) is a village in the municipality of Doboj, Republika Srpska, Bosnia and Herzegovina.

== Notable people ==
- Borislav Paravac (born 1943), politician and former Bosnian president
- Željko Komšić's mother Danica Stanić (1941–1992) hails from Kostajnica
