= Borislav Paravac =

Bosnian Serb politician (1943–2026)

- Борислав Паравац
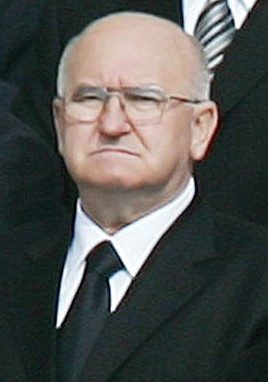
- Paravac in 2005

Chairman of the Presidency of Bosnia and Herzegovina
- In office 28 October 2004 – 28 June 2005
- Preceded by: Sulejman Tihić
- Succeeded by: Ivo Miro Jović
- In office 10 April 2003 – 27 June 2003
- Preceded by: Dragan Čović
- Succeeded by: Dragan Čović

Serb member of the Presidency of Bosnia and Herzegovina
- In office 10 April 2003 – 6 November 2006
- Prime Minister: Adnan Terzić
- Preceded by: Mirko Šarović
- Succeeded by: Nebojša Radmanović
Parliamentary offices
Member of the House of Representatives
In office 9 December 2002 – 10 April 2003
Constituency	2nd Electoral Unit
Member of the House of Peoples
In office 4 December 1998 – 31 January 2003

Personal details
- Born: 18 February 1943 Kostajnica, Doboj, Independent State of Croatia
- Died: 18 February 2026 (aged 83) Doboj, Bosnia and Herzegovina
- Party: Serb Democratic Party
- Education: University of Zagreb (BEc)

Borislav Paravac (Serbian Cyrillic: Борислав Паравац; 18 February 1943 – 18 February 2026) was a Bosnian Serb politician who served as the Serb member of the Presidency of Bosnia and Herzegovina from 2003 to 2006. Previously, he was a member of both the national House of Peoples and House of Representatives. Paravac was a member of the Serb Democratic Party.

== Early life and education ==
Paravac was born on 18 February 1943 in Kostajnica, near Doboj, in northern Bosnia and Herzegovina. He graduated from the Faculty of Economics at the University of Zagreb in 1966.

== Career ==
From 4 December 1998 until 31 January 2003, Paravac was a member of the national House of Peoples. In the 2002 general election, he was elected to the national House of Representatives.

Following the dismissal of Mirko Šarović from his post at the Bosnian Presidency by the High Representative for Bosnia and Herzegovina, Lord Paddy Ashdown, Paravac was appointed to the post on 10 April 2003. He held the position of Presidency Chairman on two occasions. His term as Presidency member ended on 6 November 2006 and was succeeded by Nebojša Radmanović.

== Death ==
Paravac died after a long illness in Doboj, on 18 February 2026, his 83rd birthday.
