= Adnan Terzić =

Chairman of the Council of Ministers of Bosnia and Herzegovina from 2002 to 2007

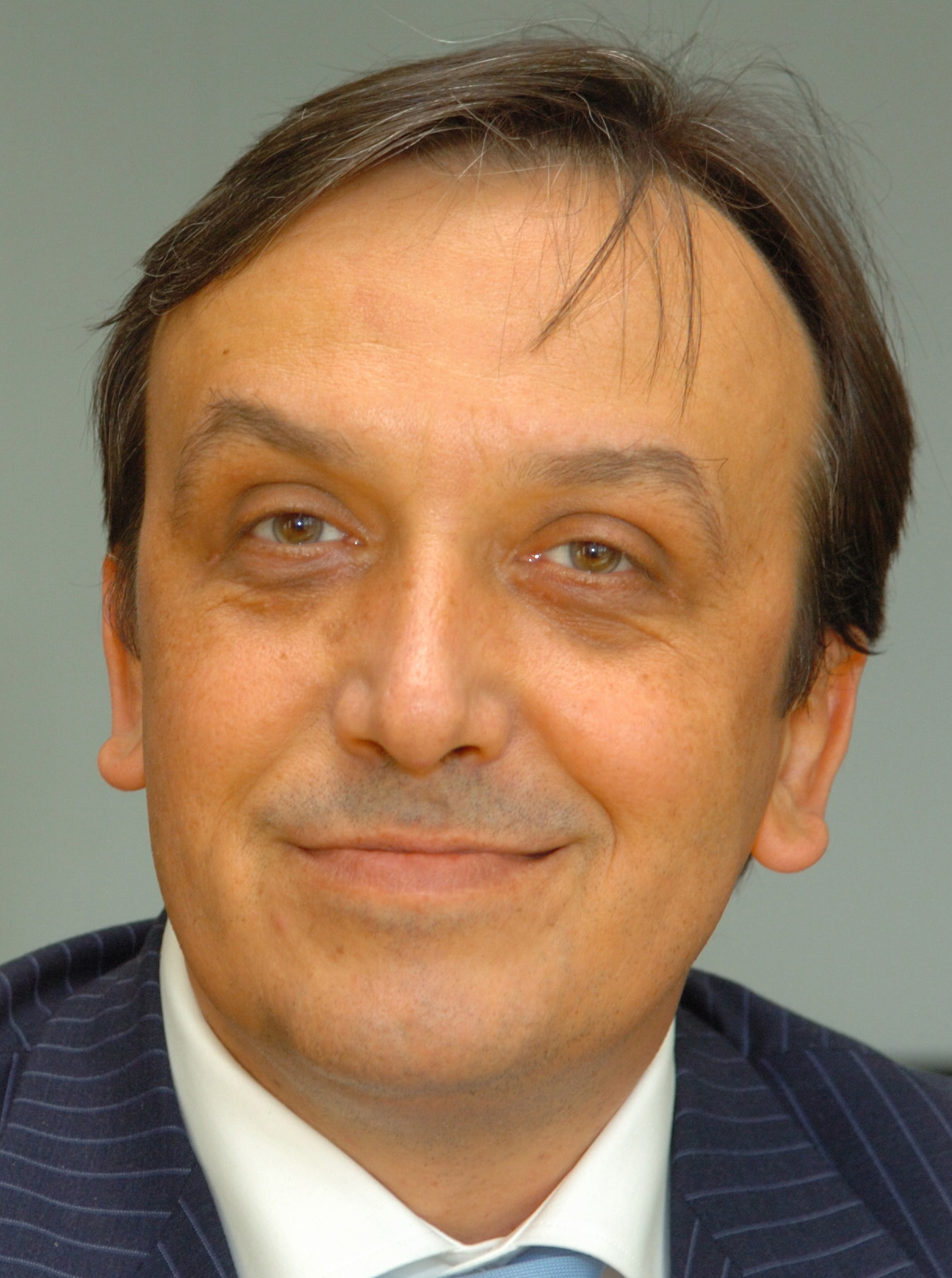
- Terzić in 2005

Chairman of the Council of Ministers of Bosnia and Herzegovina
- In office 23 December 2002 – 11 January 2007
- President: See list: Sulejman Tihić Haris Silajdžić Mirko Šarović Borislav Paravac Nebojša Radmanović Dragan Čović Ivo Miro Jović Željko Komšić
- Preceded by: Dragan Mikerević
- Succeeded by: Nikola Špirić

Governor of Central Bosnia Canton
- In office 1997 – 10 November 1998
- Preceded by: Ivan Šarić
- Succeeded by: Branko Golub

Personal details
- Born: 5 April 1960 (age 66) Zagreb, PR Croatia, FPR Yugoslavia
- Party: Union for a Better Future (2010–present)
- Other political affiliations: Party of Democratic Action (1991–2009)
- Spouse: Maida Terzić
- Children: 1
- Education: University of Sarajevo (BE)

Adnan Terzić (born 5 April 1960) is a Bosnian politician who served as Chairman of the Council of Ministers of Bosnia and Herzegovina from 2002 to 2007. He was a longtime member of the Party of Democratic Action, until he left it to join the Union for a Better Future.

Terzić was born in Zagreb in 1960, before moving to Sarajevo in his youth. He graduated from the University of Sarajevo in 1986. He was in the Army of the Republic of Bosnia and Herzegovina during the Bosnian War. Following the war, Terzić served as Governor of Central Bosnia Canton from 1997 to 1998. He was afterwards elected to the Federal Parliament.

Following the 2002 general election, Terzić was appointed Chairman of the Council of Ministers. He was succeeded as chairman by Nikola Špirić in January 2007.

== Early life and education ==
Terzić was born on 5 April 1960 in Zagreb, FPR Yugoslavia to Bosniak parents. His parents moved to Sarajevo when he was a kid, and there he graduated from the Faculty of Civil engineering at the University of Sarajevo in 1986.

== Career ==
From 1986 until 1990, Terzić was an advisor in the municipal government in Travnik. He joined the Party of Democratic Action (SDA) in 1991, shortly after it was founded. Between 1992 and 1995, he served in the Army of the Republic of Bosnia and Herzegovina during the Bosnian War.

Following the war, Terzić was the president of the municipal council in Travnik from 1996 to 2001. He also served as Governor of Central Bosnia Canton. On 13 October 2001, he became the vice-president of the SDA, holding office until 2009.

Terzić served as Chairman of the Council of Ministers of Bosnia and Herzegovina from 23 December 2002 to 11 January 2007. In 2009, he left the SDA and joined Fahrudin Radončić's newly established Union for a Better Future one year later, and was also named as the party's new vice-president.

== Personal life ==
Terzić lives in Sarajevo with his wife Maida and their son Tarik.

Political offices
| Preceded by Dragan Mikerević | Chairman of the Council of Ministers of Bosnia and Herzegovina; 2002–2007 | Succeeded by Nikola Špirić |
