= Nebojša Radmanović =

Bosnian Serb politician (born 1949)

- Небојша Радмановић
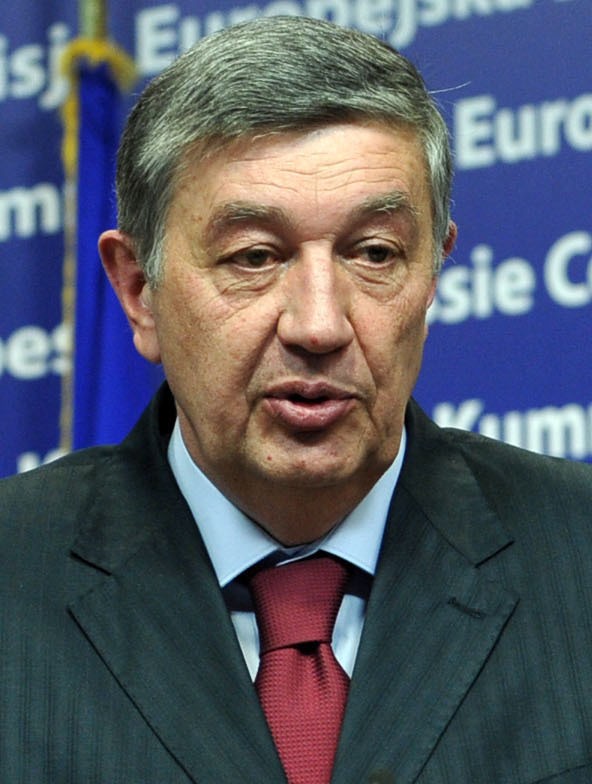
- Radmanović in 2009

Chairman of the Presidency of Bosnia and Herzegovina
- In office 10 November 2012 – 10 July 2013
- Preceded by: Bakir Izetbegović
- Succeeded by: Željko Komšić
- In office 10 November 2010 – 10 July 2011
- Preceded by: Haris Silajdžić
- Succeeded by: Željko Komšić
- In office 6 November 2008 – 6 July 2009
- Preceded by: Haris Silajdžić
- Succeeded by: Željko Komšić
- In office 6 November 2006 – 6 July 2007
- Preceded by: Sulejman Tihić
- Succeeded by: Željko Komšić

Serb member of the Presidency of Bosnia and Herzegovina
- In office 6 November 2006 – 17 November 2014
- Prime Minister: Adnan Terzić; Nikola Špirić; Vjekoslav Bevanda
- Preceded by: Borislav Paravac
- Succeeded by: Mladen Ivanić
Parliamentary offices
Member of the House of Representatives
Incumbent
Assumed office 6 December 2018
Constituency	1st Electoral Unit

Personal details
- Born: 5 February 1949 (age 77) Gračanica, PR Bosnia and Herzegovina, FPR Yugoslavia
- Party: Alliance of Independent Social Democrats
- Spouse: Dijana Radmanović (m. 1981)
- Children: 2
- Education: University of Belgrade (BA)

Nebojša Radmanović (Serbian Cyrillic: Небојша Радмановић, pronounced [radmǎːnoʋit͡ɕ]; born 5 February 1949) is a Bosnian Serb politician who served as the Serb member of the Presidency of Bosnia and Herzegovina from 2006 to 2014. He has been serving as member of the national House of Representatives since 2018.

Radmanović is a member of both the Alliance of Independent Social Democrats and of the Academy of Sciences and Arts of the Republika Srpska as well.

== Biography ==
=== Early life and education ===
Radmanović was born on 5 February 1949 in Gračanica, FPR Yugoslavia, present-day Bosnia and Herzegovina. He studied in Banja Luka, before graduating in history in 1974 at the Faculty of Philosophy of the University of Belgrade.

=== Early career ===
In the 1970s and 1980s, Radmanović worked as an archivist, and then as director of the Archives of Bosnian Krajina, editor of the newspaper "Glas" and director of the National Theater in Banja Luka.

During and after the Bosnian War, from 1991 to 1998, Radmanović was the first director of the Archives of Republika Srpska, and also chaired the executive board of the Banja Luka Municipal Assembly for two years.

=== Political career ===
Radmanović served as member of the National Assembly of Republika Srpska from 1998 to 2002. He also briefly served as Minister of Administration and Local Self-Government of Republika Srpska in the government of Milorad Dodik from February to November 2006.

Radmanović was elected in the 2006 general election to a four-year term as Serb member of the Presidency of Bosnia and Herzegovina and assumed office on 6 November 2006, alongside Haris Silajdžić and Željko Komšić. He was re-elected in the general election on 3 October 2010 to a second term, which ended on 17 November 2014.

In 2008, Radmanović was awarded the Medal of Pushkin for the development and expansion of international cultural cooperation between Bosnia and Herzegovina and the Russian Federation.

Following his presidency, Radmanović was appointed to the national House of Peoples for the 2014–2018 term. In the 2018 general election, he was elected to the national House of Representatives. Radmanović was re-elected as member of the House of Representatives in the 2022 general election, obtaining over 34,000 votes.

On 23 January 2025, upon the initiative of Sabina Ćudić, Radmanović was removed from the House of Representatives collegium. As his replacement, the liberal alliance Troika reached an agreement with the opposition parties from Republika Srpska to appoint Serb Democratic Party member Darko Babalj as the new member of the collegium in February 2025.

== Orders ==
=== International ===
Award or decoration	Country	Awarded by	Year	Place
Medal of Pushkin	Russia	Vladimir Putin	2007	Moscow

Political offices
Preceded by Borislav Paravac	Serb member of the Presidency of Bosnia and Herzegovina; 2006–2014	Succeeded by Mladen Ivanić
