= History of Bosnia and Herzegovina =

History of the European country of Bosnia and Herzegovina

Bosnia and Herzegovina is a country in Southeast Europe on the Balkan Peninsula. It has had permanent settlement since the Neolithic Age. By the early historical period it was inhabited by Illyrians and Celts. Christianity arrived in the 1st century, and by the 4th century the area became part of the Western Roman Empire. Germanic tribes invaded soon after, followed by Slavs in the 6th century.

In the mid-12th century, the Banate of Bosnia emerged as a distinct political entity governed by local bans. In 1377, Tvrtko I was crowned King of Bosnia, establishing the Kingdom of Bosnia. In 1463, Bosnia was annexed into the Ottoman Empire, marking the beginning of more than 400 years of Ottoman rule in the region. They wrought great changes to the political and administrative system, introduced land reforms, and class and religious distinctions. A series of uprisings began in 1831, which culminated in the Herzegovinian rebellion, a widespread peasant uprising, in 1875. The conflict eventually forced the Ottomans to cede administration of the country to the Habsburg monarchy through the Treaty of Berlin in 1878.

The establishment of the Kingdom of Serbs, Croats, and Slovenes in 1918, officially called the Kingdom of Yugoslavia from 1929, brought the redrawing of administrative regions into the new kingdom. This purposely avoided all historical and ethnic lines, and removed any trace of Bosnian identity. The kingdom of Yugoslavia was conquered by Axis forces in World War II, and Bosnia was ceded to the Independent State of Croatia (NDH), which led to widespread persecution and genocide.

Following Axis defeat, Bosnia and Herzegovina achieved its current borders by becoming a federal unit within the Federal People's Republic of Yugoslavia, which was later renamed to the Socialist Federal Republic of Yugoslavia in 1963. After the breakup of Yugoslavia, three years of war began in 1992 which caused around 100,000 deaths and 2 million refugees. It was then when the country became an independent state.

== Prehistory and Roman Era ==
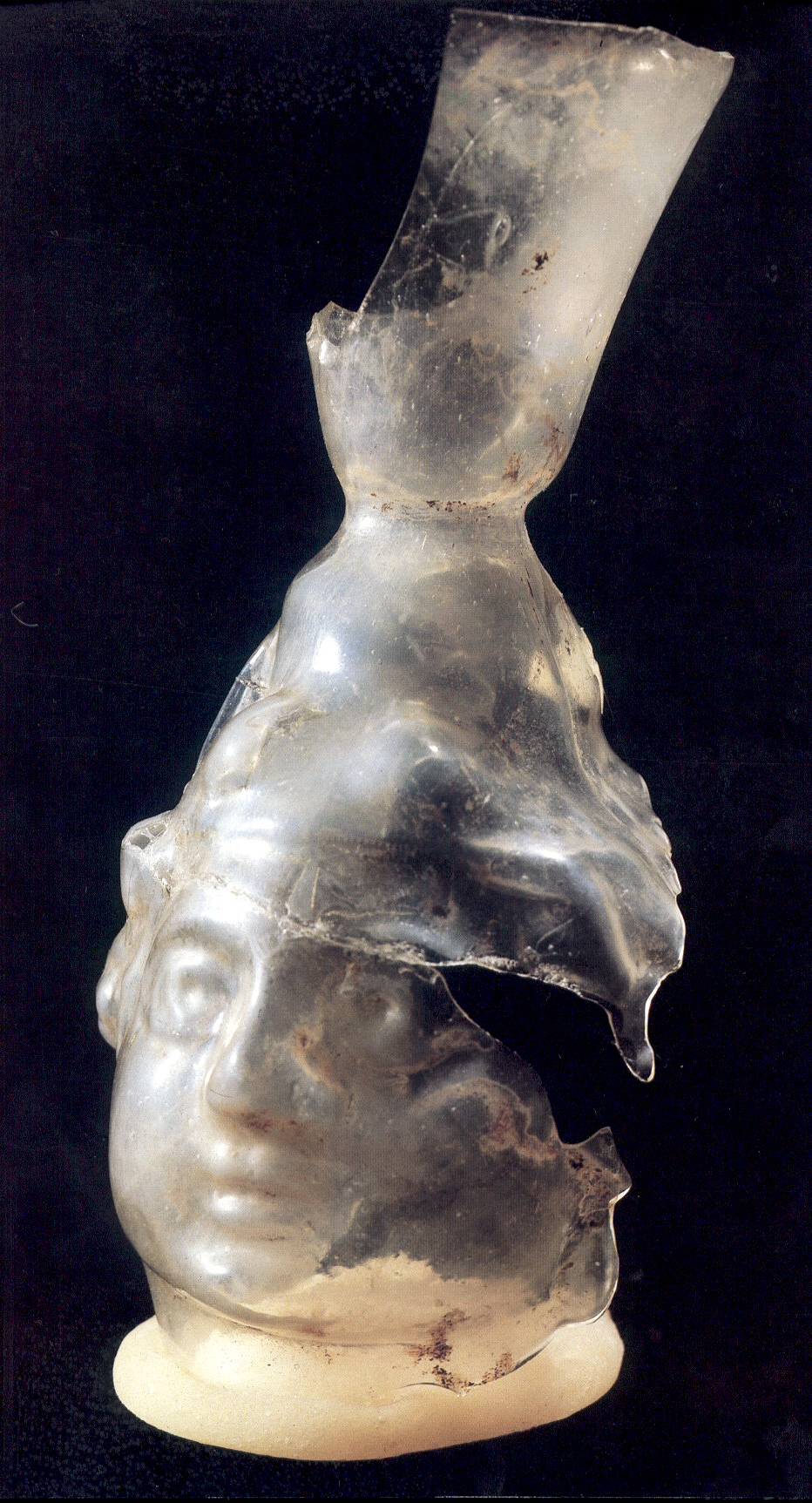
2nd c. Roman glass from Bosanski Novi

Bosnia has been inhabited since Neolithic times. In the late Bronze Age, the Neolithic population was replaced by more warlike Indo-European tribes known as the Illyrians. Celtic migrations in the 4th and 3rd century BCE displaced many Illyrian tribes from their former lands, but some Celtic and Illyrian tribes mixed. Concrete historical evidence for this period is scarce, but overall it appears that the region was populated by a number of different peoples speaking distinct languages.

Christianity had already arrived in the region by the end of the 2nd century, and numerous artefacts and objects from the time testify to this. Following events from the years 337 and 395 when the Empire split, Dalmatia and Pannonia were included in the Western Roman Empire. The region was conquered by the Ostrogoths in 455, and further exchanged hands between the Alans and Huns in the years to follow.

== Middle Ages ==
=== Early Bosnia ===
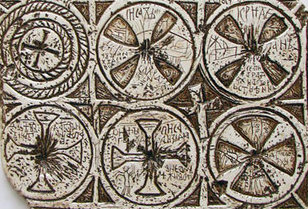
Ban Kulin stone engraving with Bosnian Cyrillic

By the 6th century, Emperor Justinian had re-conquered the area and large parts of the former Western Empire for the Byzantine Empire, named for the ancient city of Byzantium, now the capital of Constantinople since the 330s, established by Emperor Constantine the Great. The Slavs, a migratory people from southeastern Europe, were allied by the Eurasian Avars in the 6th century, and together they invaded the Eastern Roman Empire in the 6th and 7th centuries, settling in what is now Bosnia and Herzegovina and the surrounding lands. More South Slavs came in a second wave, and according to some scholars were invited by Emperor Heraclius to drive the Avars from Dalmatia on the coast of the Adriatic Sea. Around this time the speaking Latin language in northern Balkans was replaced by the Greek language.

Modern knowledge of Bosnia in the western Balkans during the Dark Ages is patchy. Upon the looter invasions by the Avars and Slavs from 6th-9th century, bringing Slavic languages, both probably gave way to feudalism only with the might by the Frankish penetrating into the region in the late 9th century (Bosnia probably originated as one such pre-feudal entity). It was also around this time that the Bosnians were Christianized. Bosnia, due to its geographic position and terrain, was probably one of the last areas to go through this process, which presumably originated from the urban centers along the Dalmatian coast.

In addition to the Slavic-speaking population, a good number of romanized people remained in south Bosnia by the year 1000. Speaking an Eastern Romance language (related to Romanian), and having retreated into mountainous areas and adopted a pastoralist way of life, they became known as Vlachs. With time they assimilated, though maintaining specific customs, and the word Vlach came to indicate any shepherd. Being well-versed with horse breeding, Vlachs came to dominate trade and caravan from coastal merchant town towards the interior, growing prosperous and coming to dominate entire regions of Hum, thus merging in Bosnia's medieval feudal society.

=== Banate of Bosnia ===
Coat of arms of the Banate of Bosnia

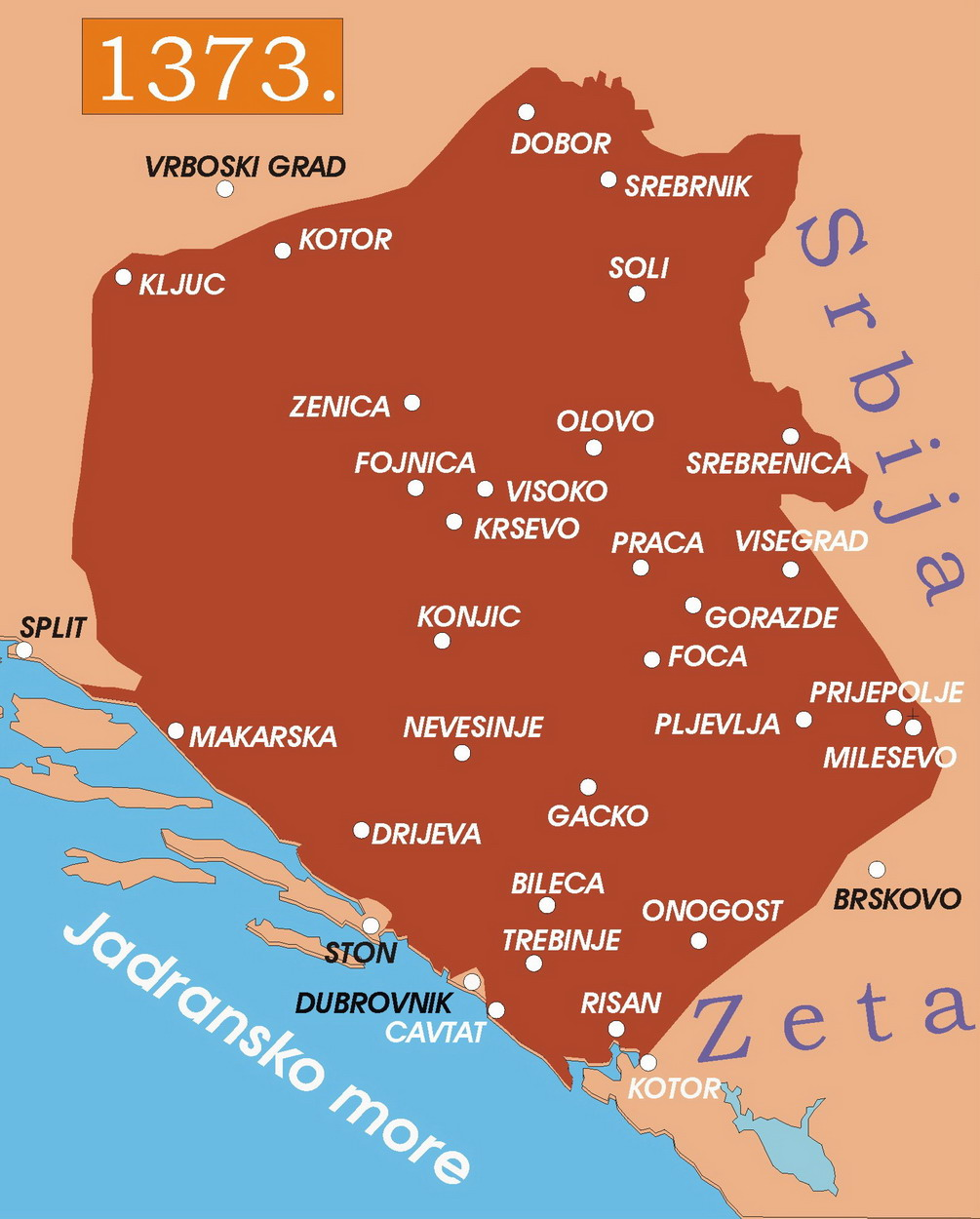
The Banate in 1373, shortly before its elevation to kingdom

It is only from the 9th century that Frankish and Byzantine sources begin to mention early Slavic polities in the region. In this regard, the earliest widely acknowledged reference to Bosnia dates from the 10th century De Administrando Imperio written by Byzantine emperor Constantine Porphyrogenitus, during which period Bosnia is part of the Serbian state of Časlav, after whose death in battle in about 960, much of Bosnia is briefly incorporated into the Croatian state of Krešimir II. Shortly thereafter, in 997, Samuel of Bulgaria marches through Bosnia and asserts his over-lordship in parts of it, however, only to be defeated by the Byzantine Empire in 1018 which annexes Bulgaria and asserts its suzerainty in Bosnia. This lasted until later in the century when some parts of the territory of today’s Bosnia are briefly incorporated into Croatia and others into Duklja from which the latter Bosnia appears to have seceded in about 1101, upon which Bosnia's bans tried to rule for themselves. During this period, the region experiences varying political influence from the Byzantine Empire, the Kingdom of Hungary (then in personal union with the Kingdom of Croatia), and, to a lesser extent, the Grand Principality of Serbia. It was primarily under Hungarian political influence from 1137 to 1167, and primarily under Byzantine influence from 1167 to 1180. Prior to 1180 and the reign of Ban Kulin parts of Bosnia were briefly found in Serbian or Croatian units, but neither neighbor had held the Bosnians long enough to acquire their loyalty or to impose any serious claim to Bosnia.

The first recorded Ban (viceroy) was Ban Borić, allied with the Hungarian king. However, he was deposed when he backed the losing claimant in a succession dispute over the Hungarian throne. In 1167, Ban Kulin (r. 1180–1204) emerged as the Ban of Bosnia, under Byzantine political influence. Ban Kulin presided over nearly three decades of peace and stability during which he strengthened the country's economy through treaties with Dubrovnik and Venice. His rule also marked the start of a controversy with the Bosnian Church, an indigenous Christian sect considered heretical by both the Roman Catholic and Eastern Orthodox churches. In response to Hungarian attempts to use church politics regarding the issue as a way to reclaim sovereignty over Bosnia, Kulin held a council of local church leaders to renounce the heresy in 1203. Despite this, Hungarian ambitions remained unchanged long after Kulin's death in 1204, waning only after an unsuccessful invasion in 1254, which also fostered the schism of the Bosnian Church.

=== Kingdom of Bosnia ===
Territorial evolution of the Bosnian Kingdom

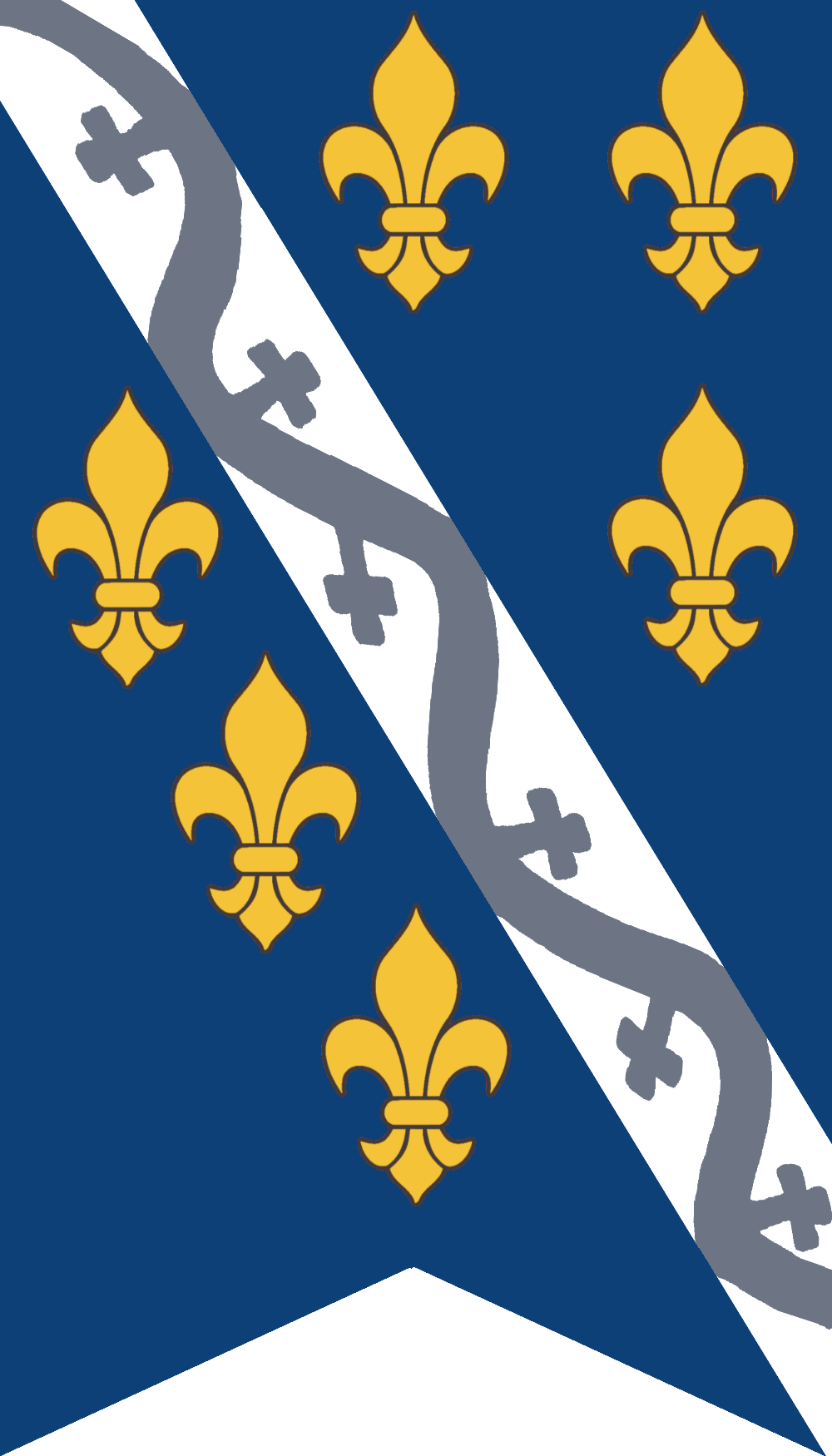
Kingdom of Bosnia 1377-1463

Following the rise of the rivalling Kotromanić family and Croatian Šubić family in the mid 13th century, the Šubić family took control of the Banate of Bosnia in the late 13th century. Bosnia regained its independence from the Croatian Šubić family in the early 14th century, when Stjepan II Kotromanić became ban, and the Kotromanić dynasty established itself as a resilient monarchy. By the time of his death in 1353, he had succeeded in annexing territories to the north and west, as well as Zahumlje and parts of Dalmatia. He was succeeded by his nephew Tvrtko who, following a prolonged struggle with nobility and inter-family strife, gained full control of the country in 1367. Under Tvrtko, Bosnia grew in both size and power, finally becoming an independent kingdom in 1377. Following his death in 1391 however, Bosnia fell into a long period of decline. The Ottoman Empire had already started its conquest of Europe and posed a major threat to the Balkans throughout the first half of the 15th century. Finally, after decades of political and social instability, Bosnia officially fell in 1463, while resistance was active and fierce for a few more centuries. Southern regions of Bosnia, nowadays known as "Herzegovina" would follow in 1482.

== Ottoman Era (1463–1878) ==
Ottoman Bosnia - flag from 1878

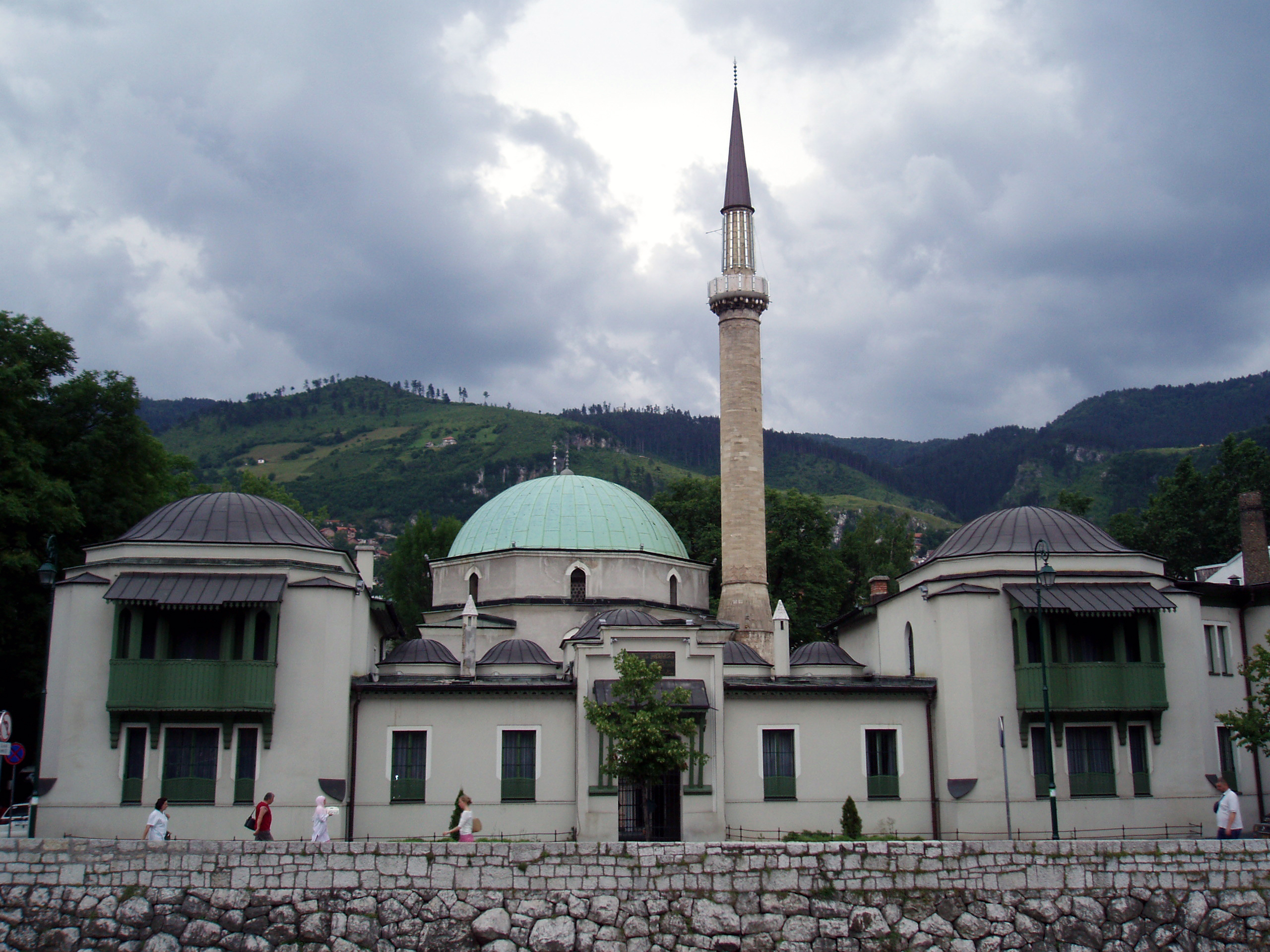
The Emperor's Mosque is the first mosque to be built (1457) after the Ottoman conquest of Bosnia.

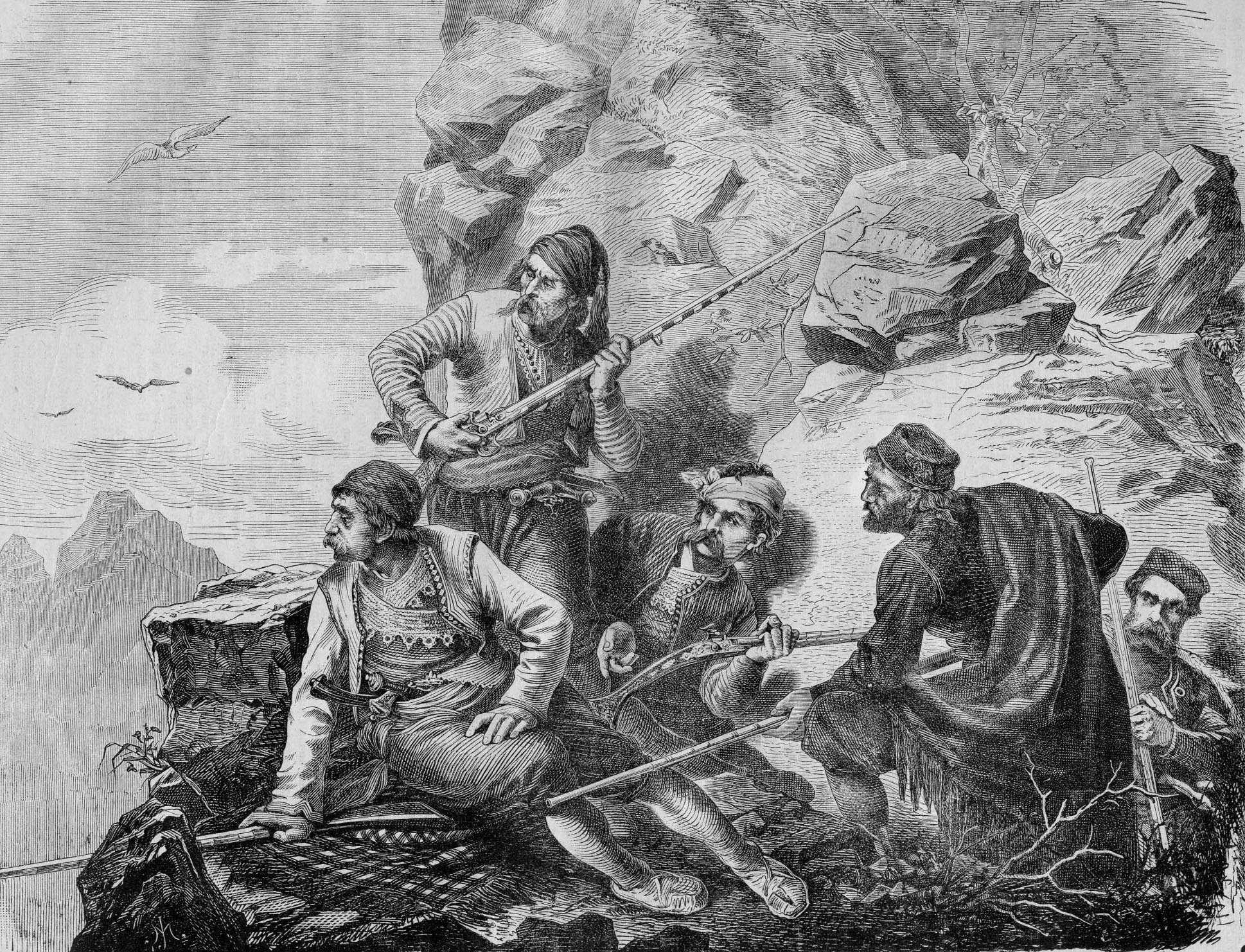
The Herzegovina Uprising of 1875–77

The Ottoman conquest of Bosnia marked a new era in the country's history and introduced tremendous changes in the political and cultural landscape of the region. Although the kingdom had been crushed and its high nobility executed, the Ottomans nonetheless allowed for the preservation of Bosnia's identity by incorporating it as an integral province of the Ottoman Empire with its historical name and territorial integrity - a unique case among subjugated states in the Balkans. Within this sandžak (and eventual vilayet) of Bosnia, the Ottomans introduced a number of key changes in the territory's socio-political administration; including a new landholding system, a reorganization of administrative units, and a complex system of social differentiation by class and religious affiliation.

The four centuries of Ottoman rule also had a drastic impact on Bosnia's population make-up, which changed several times as a result of the empire's conquests, frequent wars with European powers, migrations, and epidemics. A native Slavic-speaking Muslim community emerged and eventually became the largest ethno-religious group (Note: By the early 1600s, approximately 450,000 Muslims (67%), 150,000 Catholics (22%) and 75,000 Orthodox Christians (11%) lived Bosnia Malcolm (1995)) (mainly as a result of a gradually rising number of conversions to Islam), while a significant number of Sephardi Jews arrived following their expulsion from Spain in the late 15th century. The Bosnian Christian communities also experienced major changes. The Bosnian Franciscans (and the Catholic population as a whole) were protected by official imperial decree, although on the ground these guarantees were often disregarded and their numbers dwindled. The Orthodox community in Bosnia, initially confined to Herzegovina and southeastern Bosnia, spread throughout the country during this period and went on to experience relative prosperity until the 19th century. Meanwhile, the native schismatic Bosnian Church disappeared altogether.

As the Ottoman Empire thrived and expanded into Central Europe, Bosnia was relieved of the pressures of being a frontier province and experienced a prolonged period of general welfare and prosperity. A number of cities, such as Sarajevo and Mostar, were established and grew into major regional centers of trade and urban culture. Within these cities, various Sultans and governors financed the construction of many important works of Bosnian architecture (such as the Stari most and Gazi Husrev-beg's Mosque). Furthermore, numerous Bosnians played influential roles in the Ottoman Empire's cultural and political history during this time. Bosnian soldiers formed a large component of the Ottoman ranks in the battles of Mohács and Krbava field, two decisive military victories, while numerous other Bosnians rose through the ranks of the Ottoman military bureaucracy to occupy the highest positions of power in the Empire, including admirals, generals, and grand viziers. Many Bosnians also made a lasting impression on Ottoman culture, emerging as mystics, scholars, and celebrated poets in the Turkish, Arabic, and Persian languages.

By the late 17th century, however, the Ottoman Empire's military misfortunes caught up with the country, and the conclusion of the Great Turkish War with the Treaty of Karlowitz in 1699 once again made Bosnia the empire's westernmost province. But they allowed some of the Bosnian tribes to immigrate into the Arabian countries (Palestine, Jordan). The following hundred years were marked by further military failures, numerous revolts within Bosnia, and several outbursts of plague.

According to an Ottoman Muslim account of the Austro-Russian–Turkish War (1735–39) translated into English by C. Fraser, Bosnian Muslim women fought in battle since they "acquired the courage of heroes" against the Austrian Germans at the siege of Osterwitch-atyk (Östroviç-i âtık) fortress. Bosnian Muslim women and men were among the casualties during the Battle of Osterwitchatyk. Bosnian Muslim women fought in the defense of the fortress of Būzin (Büzin). Women and men resisted the Austrians at the Chetin (Çetin) Fortress. The women of the Bosnians were deemed to be militaristic according to non-Ottoman records of the war between the Ottomans and Austrians and they played a role in the Bosnian success in battle against the Austrian attackers. Yeni Pazar, Izvornik, Östroviç-i âtık, Çetin, Būzin, Gradişka, and Banaluka were struck by the Austrians. A French account described the bravery in battle of Bosnian Muslim women who fought in the war.

The Porte's efforts at modernizing the Ottoman state were met with great hostility in Bosnia, where local aristocrats stood to lose much through the proposed reforms. This, combined with frustrations over political concessions to nascent Christian states in the east, culminated in a famous (albeit ultimately unsuccessful) revolt by Husein Gradaščević in 1831. Related rebellions would be extinguished by 1850. A renewed effort at Ottoman reforms occurred in the 1860s under the leadership of the governor Topal Şerif Osman occurred, as he founded a provincial printing press in 1866 that published in both Ottoman Turkish and Bosnian. Later, agrarian unrest eventually sparked the Herzegovinian rebellion, a widespread peasant uprising, in 1875. The conflict rapidly spread and came to involve several Balkan states and Great Powers, which eventually forced the Ottomans to cede administration of the country to the Habsburg monarchy through the Treaty of Berlin in 1878. While violent revolt prompted many to disparage Ottoman rule, it was in fact Ottoman reforms in the realm of cultural production and education that "created the conditions for greater intellectual production that continued during the Habsburg era."

== Habsburg occupation (1878–1918) ==
Coat of arms of Bosnia and Herzegovina during Habsburg times.

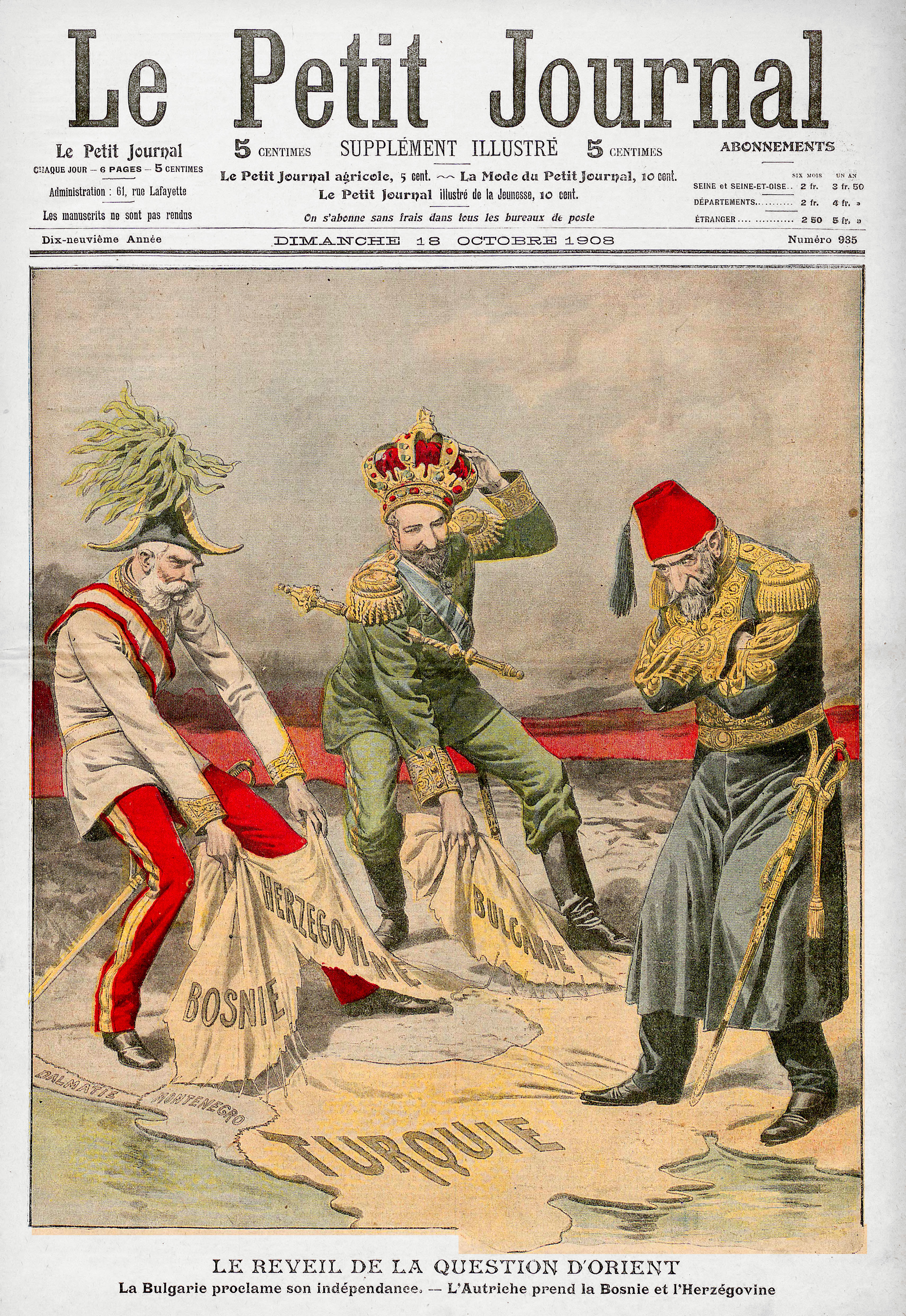
Illustration from the French magazine Le Petit Journal on the Bosnian Crisis: Bulgaria declares its independence and its prince Ferdinand is named Tsar, Austria-Hungary, in the person of Franz Joseph, annexes Bosnia and Herzegovina, while the Ottoman Sultan Abdul Hamid II looks on helplessly

Though a Habsburg military force quickly subjugated initial armed resistance upon take-over, tensions remained in certain parts of the country (particularly Herzegovina) and a mass emigration of predominantly Muslim dissidents occurred. However, a state of relative stability was reached soon enough and Habsburg authorities were able to embark on a number of social and administrative reforms which intended to make Bosnia and Herzegovina into a "model colony". With the aim of establishing the province as a stable political model that would help dissipate rising South Slav nationalism, Habsburg rule did much to codify laws, to introduce new political practices, and generally to provide for modernization. The Habsburgs took special care to integrate local Muslims into the fabric of empire, continuing, for example, to publish a provincial yearbook—much like the Ottomans—in Turkish for over a decade after the end of Ottoman rule. Many local officials moreover stayed the same, with the Mehmed-Beg Kapetanović Ljubušak, for example, remaining the mayor of Sarajevo under both polities and, moreover, obtaining the very same level of honor from both the Ottomans and the Habsburgs, with a Third Class Order of Mecidiye and an Order of the Iron Crown Third Class, respectively. All of this amounted to what one historian has called an "almost seamless transition from one empire to another."

Although successful economically, Habsburg policy - which focused on advocating the ideal of a pluralist and multi-confessional Bosnian nation (largely favored by the Muslims) - failed to curb the rising tides of nationalism. The concept of Croat and Serb nationhood had already spread to Bosnia and Herzegovina's Catholics and Orthodox communities from neighboring Croatia and Serbia in the mid 19th century, and was too well-entrenched to allow for the widespread acceptance of a parallel idea of Bosnian nationhood. By the latter half of the 1910s, nationalism was an integral factor of Bosnian politics, with national political parties corresponding to the three groups dominating elections.

The idea of a unified South Slavic state (typically expected to be spearheaded by independent Serbia) became a popular political ideology in the region at this time, including in Bosnia and Herzegovina. The Habsburg's decision to formally annex Bosnia-Herzegovina in 1908 (the Bosnian Crisis) added to a sense of urgency among these nationalists. The political tensions caused by all this culminated on 28 June 1914, when a Young Bosnia revolutionary named Gavrilo Princip assassinated the heir to the Habsburg throne, Archduke Franz Ferdinand, in Sarajevo. The event set off a chain of events that led to the outbreak of World War I. Although 10% of the Bosnian population died serving in the armies or being killed by the various warring states, Bosnia and Herzegovina itself managed to escape the conflict relatively unscathed.

== Kingdom of Yugoslavia (1918–1941) ==
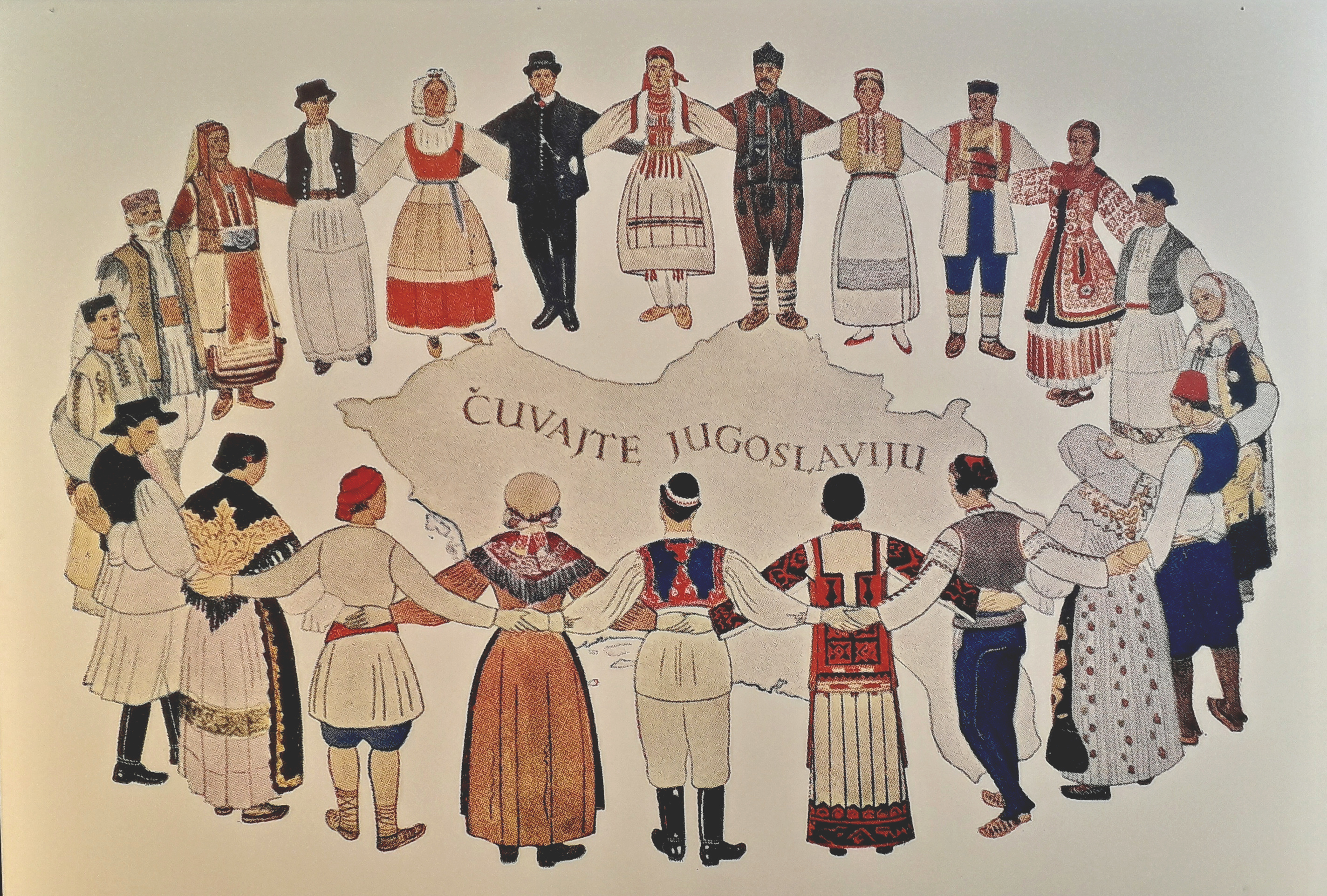
"Keep/Protect Yugoslavia" (Čuvajte Jugoslaviju), a variant of the alleged last words of King Alexander, in an illustration of Yugoslav peoples dancing the kolo.

Following World War I, Bosnia was incorporated into the South Slav kingdom of Serbs, Croats and Slovenes (soon renamed Yugoslavia). Political life in Bosnia at this time was marked by two major trends: social and economic unrest over the Agrarian Reform of 1918–19 manifested through mass colonization and property confiscation; also formation of several political parties that frequently changed coalitions and alliances with parties in other Yugoslav regions. The dominant ideological conflict of the Yugoslav state, between Croatian regionalism and Serbian centralization, was approached differently by Bosnia's major ethnic groups and was dependent on the overall political atmosphere. Although the initial split of the country into 33 oblasts erased the presence of traditional geographic entities from the map, the efforts of Bosnian politicians such as Mehmed Spaho ensured that the six oblasts carved up from Bosnia and Herzegovina corresponded to the six sanjaks from Ottoman times and, thus, matched the country's traditional boundary as a whole.

The establishment of the Kingdom of Yugoslavia in 1929, however, brought the redrawing of administrative regions into banates that purposely avoided all historical and ethnic lines, removing any trace of a Bosnian entity. Serbo-Croat tensions over the structuring of the Yugoslav state continued, with the concept of a separate Bosnian division receiving little or no consideration. The famous Cvetković-Maček agreement that created the Croatian banate in 1939 encouraged what was essentially a partition of Bosnia between Croatia and Serbia. However, outside political circumstances forced Yugoslav politicians to shift their attention to the rising threat posed by Adolf Hitler's Nazi Germany. Following a period that saw attempts at appeasement, the joining of the Tripartite Pact, and a coup d'état, Yugoslavia was finally invaded by Germany on 6 April 1941.

== World War II (1941–1945) ==
Bosnia was the geographical mother of the partisan movement, providing ample space amongst its mountains for training and development.

— Basil Davidson

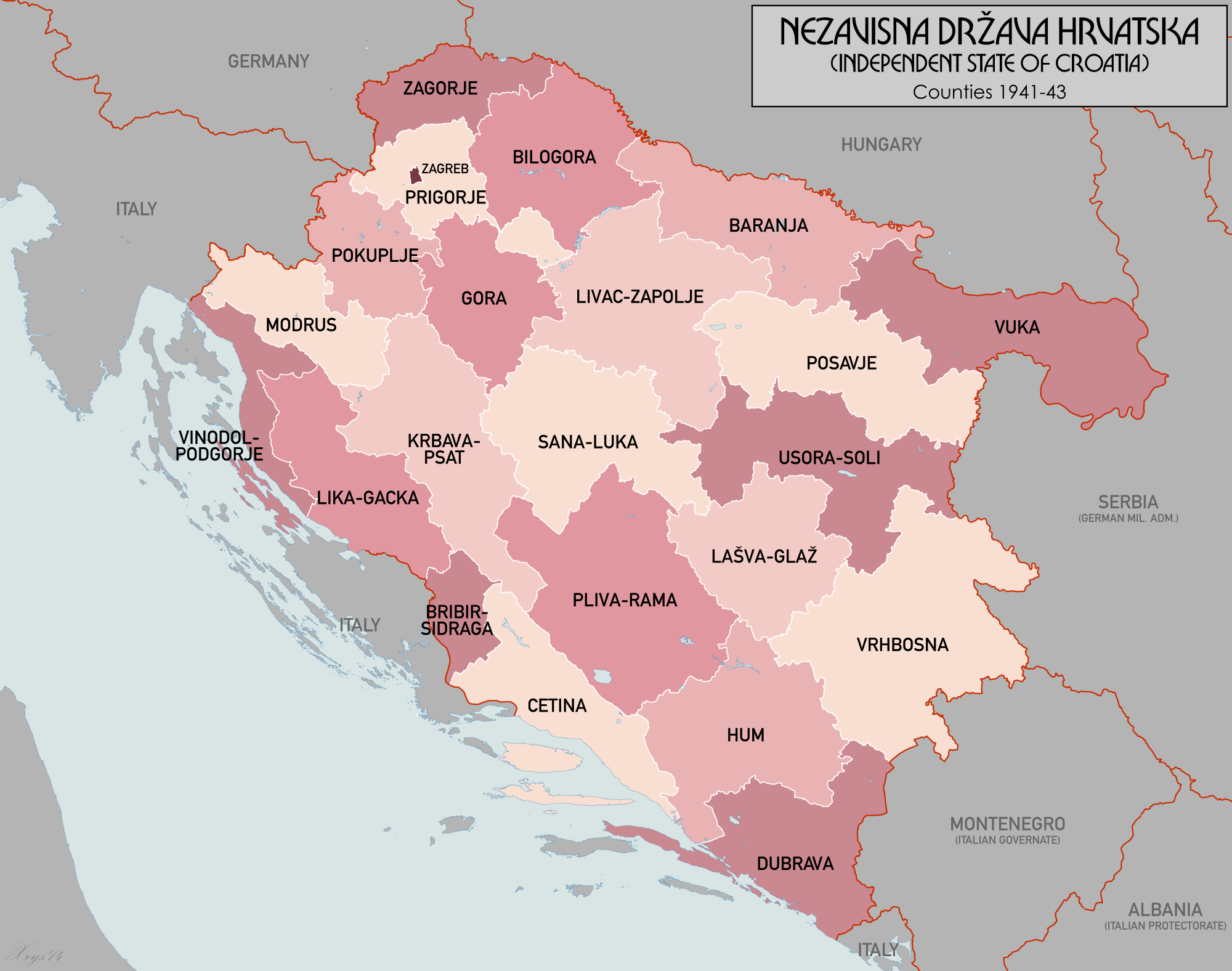
Bosnia within the Independent State of Croatia (NDH), 1942

Bosnian and Herzegovinian Partisans flag (1941-1945)

Once the kingdom of Yugoslavia was conquered by Nazi forces in World War II, all of Bosnia was ceded to the Independent State of Croatia (NDH). The NDH rule over Bosnia led to widespread persecution and genocide. The Jewish population was nearly exterminated. Hundreds of thousands of Serbs died either in Ustaše concentration camps or in widespread mass killings by Ustaše militia. Many Serbs themselves took up arms and joined the Chetniks, a Serb nationalist movement with the aim of establishing an ethnically homogeneous 'Greater Serbian' state. The Chetniks were responsible for widespread persecution and murder of non-Serbs and communist sympathizers, with the Muslim population of Bosnia, Herzegovina and Sandžak being a primary target. Once captured, Muslim villages were systematically massacred by the Chetniks. The total estimate of Muslims killed by Chetniks is between 80,000 and 100,000, most likely about 86,000 or 6.7 percent of their population (8.1 percent in Bosnia and Herzegovina alone). Several Bosnian Muslim paramilitary units joined the NDH forces to counter their own persecution in the hands of the Serbs in Bosnia. On 12 October 1941 a group of 108 notable Muslim citizens of Sarajevo signed the Resolution of Sarajevo Muslims by which they condemned the persecution of Serbs organized by Ustaše, made distinction between Muslims who participated in such persecutions and the wider Muslim population, presented information about the persecutions of Muslims by Serbs and requested security for all citizens of the country, regardless of their identity. According to the US Holocaust Museum, 320,000-340,000 ethnic Serbs were murdered. According to the Yad Vashem Holocaust Museum and Research Center, "More than 500,000 Serbs were murdered in horribly sadistic ways, 250,000 were expelled, and another 200,000 were forced to convert" during WWII in the Independent State of Croatia (modern day Croatia and Bosnia).

Starting in 1941, Yugoslav communists under the leadership of Josip Broz Tito organized their own multi-ethnic resistance group, the Partisans, who fought against Axis, Ustaše, and Chetnik forces. They too, committed numerous atrocities, mainly against political opponents of all ethnicities. Some Bosnian Muslims joined the Waffen-SS and the SS "Handschar" division, an SS division of the Nazis that pledged allegiance to both Adolf Hitler and NDH leader, Ante Pavelić. The division was the first SS division which was constituted of non-Germans. On 25 November 1943 the Anti-Fascist Council of National Liberation of Yugoslavia with Tito at its helm held a founding conference in Jajce where Bosnia and Herzegovina was reestablished as a republic within the Yugoslavian federation in its Ottoman borders. Military success eventually prompted the Allies to support the Partisans. On 6 April 1945 Sarajevo was captured by the Partisans. The end of the war resulted in the establishment of the Federal People's Republic of Yugoslavia, with the constitution of 1946 officially making Bosnia and Herzegovina one of six constituent republics in the new state.

== Socialist Yugoslavia (1945–1992) ==
Coat of arms of the Socialist Republic of Bosnia and Herzegovina

Because of its central geographic position within the People's Republic for much of the 1950s and 1960s, the 1970s saw the ascension of a strong Bosnian political elite. While working within the communist system, politicians such as Džemal Bijedić, Branko Mikulić and Hamdija Pozderac reinforced and protected the sovereignty of Bosnia and Herzegovina Their efforts proved key during the turbulent period following Tito's death in 1980, and are today considered some of the early steps towards Bosnian independence. However, the republic could not escape the increasingly nationalistic climate of the time unscathed.

== Independence and Bosnian War (1992–1995) ==
Coat of Arms of the Republic of Bosnia and Herzegovina

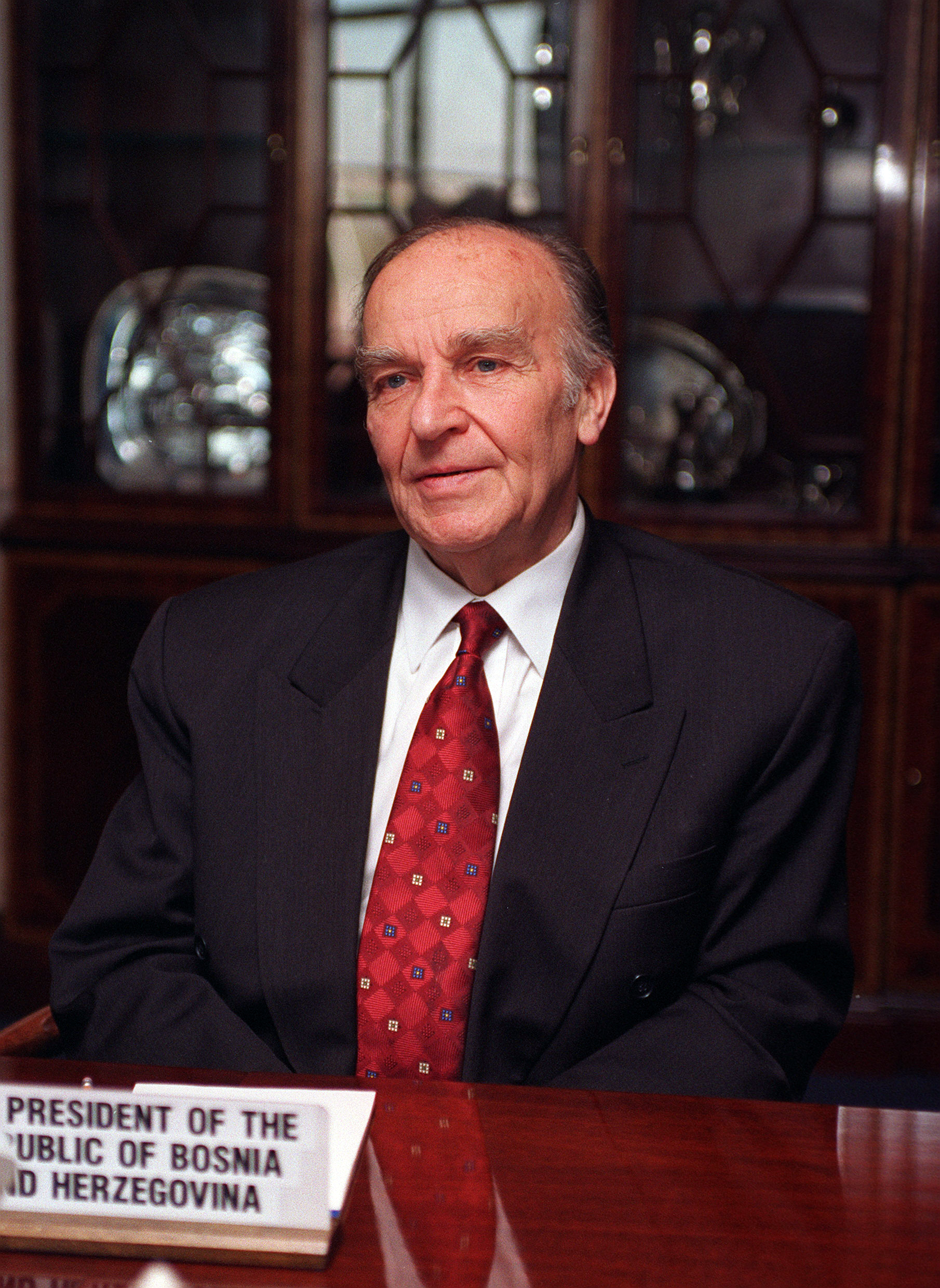
Alija Izetbegović during his visit to the United States in 1997.

The first multi-party parliamentary elections held on 18 and 25 November 1990 led to a national assembly dominated by three ethnically based parties, which had formed a loose coalition to oust the communists from power. Croatia and Slovenia's subsequent declarations of independence and the warfare that ensued placed Bosnia and Herzegovina and its three constituent peoples in an awkward position. A significant split soon developed on the issue of whether to stay with the Yugoslav federation (overwhelmingly favored among Serbs) or seek independence (overwhelmingly favored among Bosniaks and Croats). A declaration of sovereignty on 15 October 1991 was followed by a referendum for independence from Yugoslavia on 29 February and 1 March 1992. The referendum was boycotted by the great majority of Bosnian Serbs, so with a voter turnout of 64%, 98% of which voted in favor of the proposal. Bosnia and Herzegovina became an independent state on 3 March 1992.

While the first casualty of the war is debated, significant Serbian offensives began in March 1992 in Eastern and Northern Bosnia. Following a tense period of escalating tensions the opening shots in the incipient Bosnian conflict were fired when Serb paramilitary forces attacked Bosniak villages around Čapljina on 7 March 1992 and around Bosanski Brod and Goražde on 15 March. These minor attacks were followed by much more serious Serb artillery attacks on Neum on 19 March and on Bosanski Brod on 24 March. The killing of a Bosniak civilian woman on 5 April 1992 by a sniper, while she was demonstrating in Sarajevo against the raising of barricades by Bosnian Serbs, is widely regarded as marking the start of warfare between the three major communities. Open warfare began in Sarajevo on 6 April. International recognition of Bosnia and Herzegovina meant that the Yugoslav People's Army (JNA) officially withdrew from the republic's territory, although their Bosnian Serb members merely joined the Army of Republika Srpska. Armed and equipped from JNA stockpiles in Bosnia, supported by volunteers, Republika Srpska's offensives in 1992 managed to place much of the country under its control. By 1993, when an armed conflict erupted between the Sarajevo government and the Croat statelet of Herzeg-Bosnia, about 70% of the country was controlled by the Serbs.

In March 1994, the signing of the Washington accords between the Bosniak and ethnic-Croatian leaders led to the creation of a joint Bosniak-Croat Federation of Bosnia and Herzegovina. This, along with international outrage at Serb war crimes and atrocities (most notably the Srebrenica massacre of as many as 8,000 Bosniak males in July 1995) helped turn the tide of war. The signing of the Dayton Agreement in Paris by the presidents of Bosnia and Herzegovina (Alija Izetbegović), Croatia (Franjo Tuđman), and Yugoslavia (Slobodan Milošević) brought a halt to the fighting, roughly establishing the basic structure of the present-day state. The three years of war and bloodshed had left between 90,000 and 110,000 people killed and more than 2 million displaced.

== Post-war Bosnia and Herzegovina (1995–present) ==
Coat of arms of Bosnia and Herzegovina

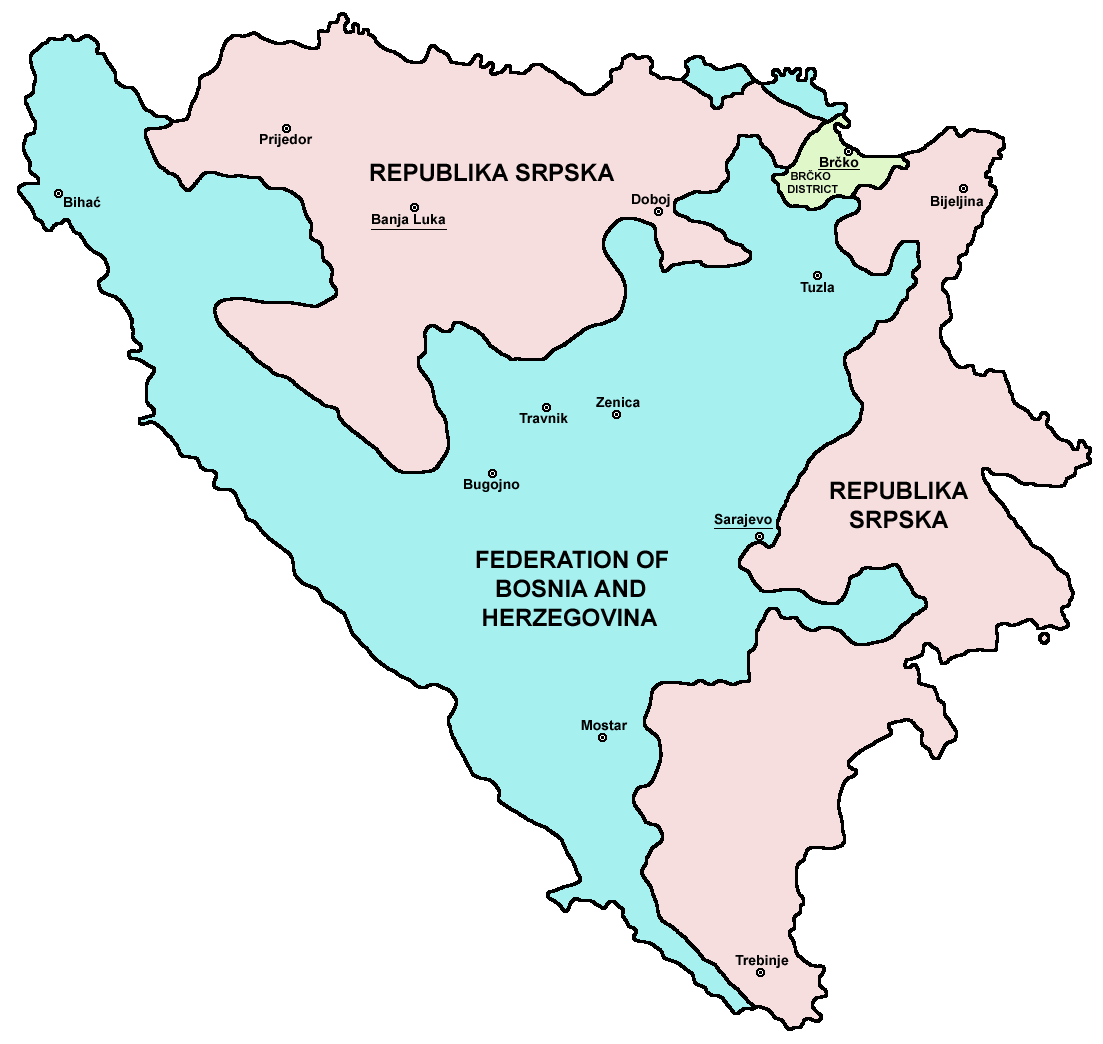
Administrative division of modern Bosnia and Herzegovina.

Since its 1992 independence and the 1995 Constitutional framework of the Dayton Agreement, Bosnia and Herzegovina has followed a path of state-building, while remaining under final international supervision through the figure of the High Representative for Bosnia and Herzegovina. Bosnia and Herzegovina is a federation of two Entities - the Federation of Bosnia and Herzegovina and the Republika Srpska, as well as the district of Brčko. Each of the Entities has its own Constitution and extensive legislative powers.

Bosnia and Herzegovina is a potential candidate country for accession into the EU; the EU-BiH Stabilization and Association Agreement (SAA) was signed in 2008 and entered into force in June 2015. Bosnia and Herzegovina submitted its formal application for EU membership on 15 February 2016; the EU Council conditioned its consideration to further progress on the implementation of the Reform Agenda, as well as to the adaptation of the SAA to take into account the EU accession of Croatia, and to an agreement on a functioning Coordination Mechanism on EU matters. These conditions were fulfilled by the Summer 2016.

The accession of Bosnia and Herzegovina to NATO is in the negotiation phase, and a Membership Action Plan was signed in April 2010. It requires Bosnia and Herzegovina to define the issue of property over defence assets before NATO may consider the next steps. Bosnian political parties have different attitudes towards NATO: while Bosniak and Bosnian Croat parties support it, Bosnian Serb parties are more cautious and, while not opposing it in principle, require it to be put to a referendum first.

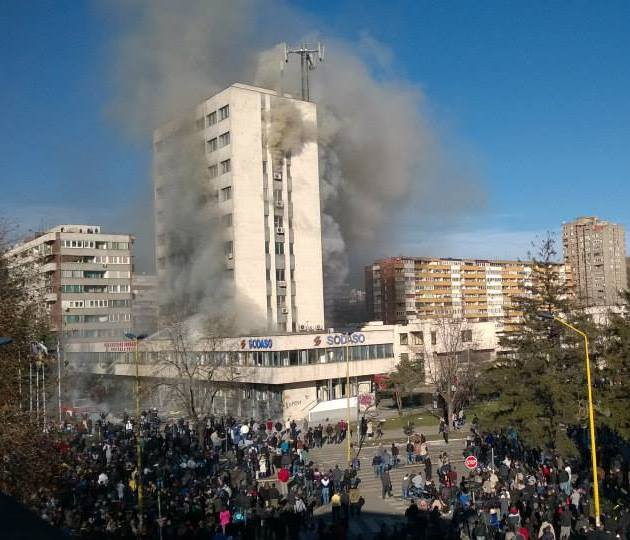
Tuzla government building burning after anti-government clashes on 7 February 2014

On 4 February 2014, the protests against the government of the Federation of Bosnia and Herzegovina, one of the country's two entities, began in the northern town of Tuzla. Workers from several factories which were privatised and which have now gone bankrupt united to demand action over jobs, unpaid salaries and pensions. Soon protests spread to the rest of the Federation, with violent clashes reported in close to 20 towns, the biggest of which were Sarajevo, Zenica, Mostar, Bihać, Brčko and Tuzla. The Bosnian news media reported that hundreds of people had been injured during the protests, including dozens of police officers, with bursts of violence in Sarajevo, in the northern city of Tuzla, in Mostar in the south, and in Zenica in central Bosnia. The same level of unrest or activism did not occur in the Republika Srpska, but hundreds of people also gathered in support of protests in the town of Banja Luka against its separate government. The protests marked the largest outbreak of public anger over high unemployment and two decades of political inertia in the country since the end of the Bosnian War in 1995.

== See also ==
- League of Communists of Yugoslavia
- President of Bosnia and Herzegovina
- List of prime ministers of Bosnia and Herzegovina
- List of heads of state of Yugoslavia
- List of prime ministers of Yugoslavia
- Politics of Bosnia and Herzegovina
- Republika Srpska
- 2014 unrest in Bosnia and Herzegovina
- 2014 Bosnia and Herzegovina floods
