= Gajevi =

Gajevi may refer to:

- Gajevi (Šamac), a village in Bosnia and Herzegovina
- Gajevi (Brčko), a village in Bosnia and Herzegovina
- Gajevi (Ilijaš), a village in Bosnia and Herzegovina
