= Gredice =

Gredice may refer to:

- Gredice, Bosnia and Herzegovina, a village near Brčko, Bosnia
- Gredice, Croatia, a village near Klanjec, Croatia
