= Popovo Polje, Brčko =

Popovo Polje
- Village
- Location within Bosnia and Herzegovina
- Coordinates: 44.7973367°N 18.9269542°E
- Country: Bosnia and Herzegovina
- Entity: Brčko District

Area
  - Total: 1.80 sq mi (4.65 km^{2})

Population (2013)
  - Total: 155
  - Density: 86.3/sq mi (33.3/km^{2})
- Time zone: UTC+1 (CET)
  - Summer (DST): UTC+2 (CEST)

Bridge in Popovo Polje, Brcko District

Popovo Polje is a village in the municipality of Brčko, Bosnia and Herzegovina.

== Demographics ==
According to the 2013 census, its population was 155.

Ethnicity in 2013
Ethnicity	Number	Percentage
Serbs	154	99.4%
Croats	1	0.6%
Total	155	100%
