= Slijepčević =

Slijepčević (Serbian Cyrillic: Слијепчевић) is a Serbian and Croatian surname, derived from the nickname slijepče, meaning "blind one". It may refer to:

- Vladan Slijepčević (1930–1989), Serbian film director and screenwriter.
- Živko Slijepčević (born 1957), Serbian football manager and former player.
- Đoko M. Slijepčević (1907–1993), Serbian historian.

== See also ==
- Slepčević, surname
- Sljepčević, surname
- Slijepčevići, settlement in Bosnia and Herzegovina
- Slepčević, settlement in Serbia
