= Ulice, Brčko =

Village in Bosnia and Herzegovina

Ulice
- Village
- Location within Bosnia and Herzegovina
- Coordinates: 44.8820569°N 18.6868191°E
- Country: Bosnia and Herzegovina
- Entity: Brčko District

Area
  - Total: 3.63 sq mi (9.40 km^{2})

Population (2013)
  - Total: 892
  - Density: 246/sq mi (94.9/km^{2})
- Time zone: UTC+1 (CET)
  - Summer (DST): UTC+2 (CEST)

Ulice is a village in the municipality of Brčko, Bosnia and Herzegovina.

== Demographics ==
According to the 2013 census, its population was 892.

Ethnicity in 2013
Ethnicity	Number	Percentage
Croats	801	89.8%
Serbs	86	9.6%
Bosniaks	2	0.2%
other/undeclared	3	0.3%
Total	892	100%
