= Vitanovići Donji =

Vitanovići Donji Витановићи Доњи
- Village
- Location within Bosnia and Herzegovina
- Coordinates: 44°50′50″N 18°40′55″E
- Country: Bosnia and Herzegovina
- Entity: Brčko District

Area
  - Total: 1.99 sq mi (5.16 km^{2})

Population (2013)
  - Total: 396
  - Density: 199/sq mi (76.7/km^{2})
- Time zone: UTC+1 (CET)
  - Summer (DST): UTC+2 (CEST)

Vitanovići Donji (Serbian Cyrillic: Витановићи Доњи) is a village in the municipality of Brčko, Bosnia and Herzegovina.

== Demographics ==
According to the 2013 census, its population was 396.

Ethnicity in 2013
Ethnicity	Number	Percentage
Croats	352	88.9%
Serbs	27	6.8%
Bosniaks	17	4.3%
Total	396	100%
