= Čande =

Čande Чанде
- Village
- Location within Bosnia and Herzegovina
- Coordinates: 44°47′N 18°41′E
- Country: Bosnia and Herzegovina
- Entity: Brčko District

Area
  - Total: 0.46 sq mi (1.19 km^{2})

Population (2013)
  - Total: 321
  - Density: 699/sq mi (270/km^{2})
- Time zone: UTC+1 (CET)
  - Summer (DST): UTC+2 (CEST)

Čande (Serbian Cyrillic: Чанде) is a village in the municipality of Brčko, Bosnia and Herzegovina.

== Demographics ==
According to the 2013 census, its population was 321.

Ethnicity in 2013
Ethnicity	Number	Percentage
Bosniaks	319	99.4%
other/undeclared	2	0.6%
Total	321	100%
