= Donji Rahić =

Donji Rahić Доњи Рахић
- Village
- Location within Bosnia and Herzegovina
- Coordinates: 44°53′N 18°44′E
- Country: Bosnia and Herzegovina
- Entity: Brčko District

Area
  - Total: 4.68 sq mi (12.11 km^{2})

Population (2013)
  - Total: 366
  - Density: 78.3/sq mi (30.2/km^{2})
- Time zone: UTC+1 (CET)
  - Summer (DST): UTC+2 (CEST)

Donji Rahić (Serbian Cyrillic: Доњи Рахић) is a village in the municipality of Brčko, Bosnia and Herzegovina.

== Demographics ==
According to the 2013 census, its population was 366.

Ethnicity in 2013
Ethnicity	Number	Percentage
Croats	299	81.7%
Serbs	53	14.5%
other/undeclared	14	3.8%
Total	366	100%
