= Bukvik Donji =

Bukvik Donji Буквик Доњи
- Village
- Location within Bosnia and Herzegovina
- Coordinates: 44°50′06″N 18°40′01″E
- Country: Bosnia and Herzegovina
- Entity: Brčko District

Area
  - Total: 2.20 sq mi (5.70 km^{2})

Population (2013)
  - Total: 97
  - Density: 44/sq mi (17/km^{2})
- Time zone: UTC+1 (CET)
  - Summer (DST): UTC+2 (CEST)

Bukvik Donji (Serbian Cyrillic: Буквик Доњи) is a village in the municipality of Brčko, Bosnia and Herzegovina.

== Demographics ==
According to the 2013 census, its population was 97.

Ethnicity in 2013
Ethnicity	Number	Percentage
Serbs	85	87.6%
Bosniaks	9	9.3%
Croats	1	1.0%
other/undeclared	2	2.1%
Total	97	100%
