= Krbeta =

Krbeta Крбета
- Village
- Location within Bosnia and Herzegovina
- Coordinates: 44°47′43″N 18°53′05″E
- Country: Bosnia and Herzegovina
- Entity: Brčko District

Area
  - Total: 1.37 sq mi (3.56 km^{2})

Population (2013)
  - Total: 175
  - Density: 127/sq mi (49.2/km^{2})
- Time zone: UTC+1 (CET)
  - Summer (DST): UTC+2 (CEST)

Krbeta (Serbian Cyrillic: Крбета) is a village in the municipality of Brčko, Bosnia and Herzegovina.

== Demographics ==
According to the 2013 census, its population was 175.

Ethnicity in 2013
Ethnicity	Number	Percentage
Serbs	173	98.9%
Croats	2	1.1%
Total	175	100%
