= Vitanovići Gornji =

Vitanovići Gornji Витановићи Горњи
- Village
- Location within Bosnia and Herzegovina
- Coordinates: 44°50′31″N 18°40′11″E
- Country: Bosnia and Herzegovina
- Entity: Brčko District

Area
  - Total: 1.55 sq mi (4.02 km^{2})

Population (2013)
  - Total: 159
  - Density: 102/sq mi (39.6/km^{2})
- Time zone: UTC+1 (CET)
  - Summer (DST): UTC+2 (CEST)

Vitanovići Gornji (Serbian Cyrillic: Витановићи Горњи) is a village in the municipality of Brčko, Bosnia and Herzegovina.

== Demographics ==
According to the 2013 census, its population was 159.

Ethnicity in 2013
Ethnicity	Number	Percentage
Croats	109	68.6%
Serbs	49	30.8%
Bosniaks	1	0.6%
Total	159	100%
