= Stanovi (Brčko) =

Stanovi Станови
- Village
- Location within Bosnia and Herzegovina
- Coordinates: 44°48′28″N 18°50′09″E
- Country: Bosnia and Herzegovina
- Entity: Brčko District

Area
  - Total: 3.29 sq mi (8.53 km^{2})

Population (2013)
  - Total: 238
  - Density: 72.3/sq mi (27.9/km^{2})
- Time zone: UTC+1 (CET)
  - Summer (DST): UTC+2 (CEST)

Stanovi (Serbian Cyrillic: Станови) is a village in the municipality of Brčko, Bosnia and Herzegovina.

== Demographics ==
According to the 2013 census, its population was 238.

Ethnicity in 2013
Ethnicity	Number	Percentage
Serbs	235	98.7%
Croats	1	0.4%
other/undeclared	2	0.8%
Total	238	100%
