= Lukavac (Brčko) =

Lukavac Лукавац
- Village
- Location within Bosnia and Herzegovina
- Coordinates: 44°49′23″N 18°41′20″E
- Country: Bosnia and Herzegovina
- Entity: Brčko District

Area
  - Total: 1.97 sq mi (5.10 km^{2})

Population (2013)
  - Total: 52
  - Density: 26/sq mi (10/km^{2})
- Time zone: UTC+1 (CET)
  - Summer (DST): UTC+2 (CEST)

Lukavac (Serbian Cyrillic: Лукавац) is a village in the municipality of Brčko, Bosnia and Herzegovina.

== Demographics ==
According to the 2013 census, its population was 52.

Ethnicity in 2013
Ethnicity	Number	Percentage
Serbs	47	90.4%
Bosniaks	3	5.8%
other/undeclared	2	3.8%
Total	52	100%
