= Krepšić =

Krepšić Крепшић
- Village
- Location within Bosnia and Herzegovina
- Coordinates: 44°56′N 18°44′E
- Country: Bosnia and Herzegovina
- Entity: Brčko District

Area
  - Total: 4.46 sq mi (11.54 km^{2})

Population (2013)
  - Total: 696
  - Density: 156/sq mi (60.3/km^{2})
- Time zone: UTC+1 (CET)
  - Summer (DST): UTC+2 (CEST)

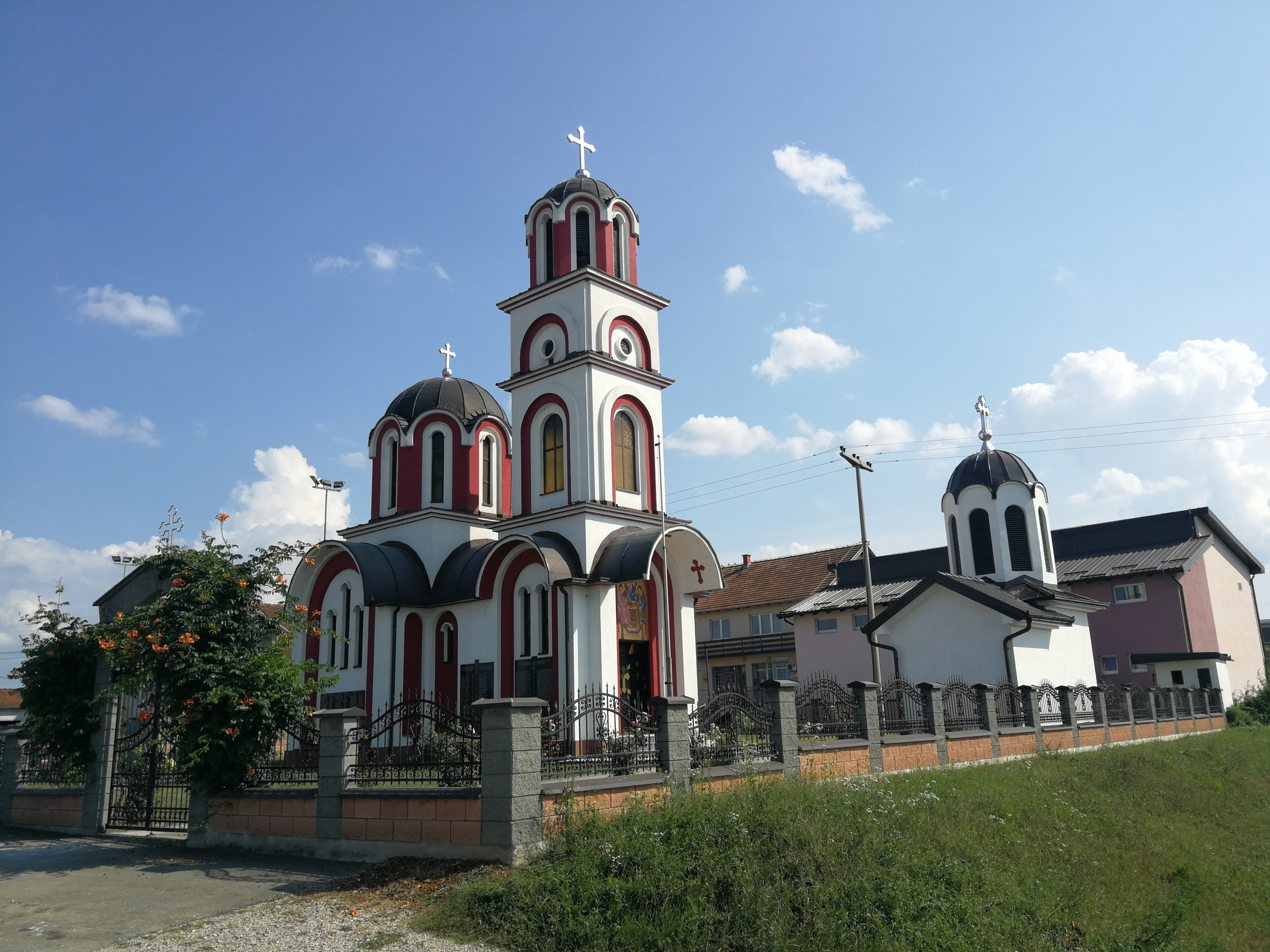

Krepšić (Serbian Cyrillic: Крепшић) is a village in the municipality of Brčko, Bosnia and Herzegovina.

== Demographics ==
According to the 2013 census, its population was 696.

Ethnicity in 2013
Ethnicity	Number	Percentage
Serbs	439	63.1%
Croats	253	36.4%
Bosniaks	1	0.1%
other/undeclared	3	0.4%
Total	696	100%
