= Skakava Donja =

Skakava Donja Скакава Доња
- Village
- Location within Bosnia and Herzegovina
- Country: Bosnia and Herzegovina
- Entity: Brčko District

Area
  - Total: 7.31 sq mi (18.93 km^{2})

Population (2013)
  - Total: 2,037
  - Density: 278.7/sq mi (107.6/km^{2})
- Time zone: UTC+1 (CET)
  - Summer (DST): UTC+2 (CEST)

Skakava Donja (Serbian Cyrillic: Скакава Доња) is a village in the municipality of Brčko, Bosnia and Herzegovina. Ammunition depots were constructed for the Yugoslavian Air Force from 1962-1969, being in service till the breakup of Yugoslavia.

== Demographics ==
According to the 2013 census, its population was 2,037.

Ethnicity in 2013
| Ethnicity | Number | Percentage |
|---|---|---|
| Croats | 1,996 | 98.0% |
| Serbs | 16 | 0.8% |
| Bosniaks | 12 | 0.6% |
| other/undeclared | 13 | 0.6% |
| Total | 2,037 | 100% |
