= Esed Kadrić =

Bosnian politician (born 1979)

Esed Kadrić (born 10 September 1979) is a Bosnian politician who served as mayor of Brčko from 2020 to 2023.

Kadrić studied at the madrasa of Tuzla and graduated in political sciences at the University of Sarajevo in 2006, also obtaining a master's degree there in 2017. Kadrić was elected member of the Brčko District assembly for the Party of Democratic Action (SDA) in 2004 and 2008. From 2011–2012 he headed the Department of Education of the Brčko District government. He was appointed deputy mayor of Brčko from 2012–2016, and speaker of the Brčko District assembly from 2016–2020. In December 2020, Kadrić was elected by the assembly as mayor of Brčko District. He is President of the SDA party branch in Brčko. He is married and the father of three kids.
