= Dubravice Donje =

Dubravice Donje Дубравице Доње
- Village
- Location within Bosnia and Herzegovina
- Coordinates: 44°47′N 18°48′E
- Country: Bosnia and Herzegovina
- Entity: Brčko District

Area
  - Total: 1.47 sq mi (3.80 km^{2})

Population (2013)
  - Total: 315
  - Density: 215/sq mi (82.9/km^{2})
- Time zone: UTC+1 (CET)
  - Summer (DST): UTC+2 (CEST)

Dubravice Donje (Serbian Cyrillic: Дубравице Доње) is a village in the municipality of Brčko, Bosnia and Herzegovina.

== Demographics ==
According to the 2013 census, its population was 315.

Ethnicity in 2013
Ethnicity	Number	Percentage
Croats	313	99.4%
Bosniaks	1	0.3%
other/undeclared	1	0.3%
Total	315	100%
