= Buzekara =

Buzekara Бузекара
- Village
- Location within Bosnia and Herzegovina
- Coordinates: 44°47′17″N 18°52′05″E
- Country: Bosnia and Herzegovina
- Entity: Brčko District

Area
  - Total: 2.72 sq mi (7.05 km^{2})

Population (2013)
  - Total: 268
  - Density: 98.5/sq mi (38.0/km^{2})
- Time zone: UTC+1 (CET)
  - Summer (DST): UTC+2 (CEST)

Buzekara (Serbian Cyrillic: Бузекара) is a village in the municipality of Brčko, Bosnia and Herzegovina.

== Demographics ==
According to the 2013 census, its population was 268.

Ethnicity in 2013
Ethnicity	Number	Percentage
Serbs	264	98.5%
Croats	2	0.7%
other/undeclared	2	0.7%
Total	268	100%
