= Ražljevo =

Ražljevo Ражљево
- Village
- Location within Bosnia and Herzegovina
- Coordinates: 44°47′35″N 18°54′43″E
- Country: Bosnia and Herzegovina
- Entity: Brčko District

Area
  - Total: 3.25 sq mi (8.42 km^{2})

Population (2013)
  - Total: 233
  - Density: 71.7/sq mi (27.7/km^{2})
- Time zone: UTC+1 (CET)
  - Summer (DST): UTC+2 (CEST)

Ražljevo (Serbian Cyrillic: Ражљево) is a village in the municipality of Brčko, Bosnia and Herzegovina.

== Demographics ==
According to the 2013 census, its population was 233.

Ethnicity in 2013
Ethnicity	Number	Percentage
Serbs	232	99.6%
Croats	1	0.4%
Total	233	100%
