= Štrepci =

Štrepci Штрепци
- Village
- Location within Bosnia and Herzegovina
- Coordinates: 44°45′N 18°41′E
- Country: Bosnia and Herzegovina
- Entity: Brčko District

Area
  - Total: 3.30 sq mi (8.55 km^{2})

Population (2013)
  - Total: 712
  - Density: 216/sq mi (83.3/km^{2})
- Time zone: UTC+1 (CET)
  - Summer (DST): UTC+2 (CEST)

Štrepci (Serbian Cyrillic: Штрепци) is a village in the municipality of Brčko, Bosnia and Herzegovina.

== Demographics ==
According to the 2013 census, its population was 712.

Ethnicity in 2013
Ethnicity	Number	Percentage
Croats	686	96.3%
Serbs	16	2.2%
Bosniaks	5	0.7%
other/undeclared	5	0.7%
Total	712	100%
