= Boće =

- Village
- Location within Bosnia and Herzegovina
- Coordinates: 44°48′47″N 18°46′03″E
- Country: Bosnia and Herzegovina
- Entity: Brčko District

Area
  - Total: 3.91 sq mi (10.12 km^{2})

Population (2013)
  - Total: 1,270
  - Density: 325/sq mi (125/km^{2})
- Time zone: UTC+1 (CET)
  - Summer (DST): UTC+2 (CEST)

Boće (Serbian Cyrillic: Боће) is a village in the municipality of Brčko, Bosnia and Herzegovina.

== Demographics ==
According to the 2013 census, its population was 1,270.

Ethnicity in 2013
Ethnicity	Number	Percentage
Croats	1,263	99.4%
Serbs	5	0.4%
Bosniaks	2	0.2%
Total	1,270	100%
