= Rašljani =

Rašljani Рашљани
- Village
- Location within Bosnia and Herzegovina
- Coordinates: 44°45′33″N 18°35′37″E
- Country: Bosnia and Herzegovina
- Entity: Brčko District

Area
  - Total: 4.79 sq mi (12.41 km^{2})

Population (2013)
  - Total: 1,078
  - Density: 225.0/sq mi (86.87/km^{2})
- Time zone: UTC+1 (CET)
  - Summer (DST): UTC+2 (CEST)

Rašljani (Serbian Cyrillic: Рашљани) is a village that is located in the municipality of Brčko, Bosnia and Herzegovina.

== Demographics ==
According to the 2013 census, its population was 1,078.

Ethnicity in 2013
| Ethnicity | Number | Percentage |
|---|---|---|
| Bosniaks | 1,066 | 98.9% |
| Serbs | 5 | 0.5% |
| Croats | 3 | 0.3% |
| other/undeclared | 4 | 0.4% |
| Total | 1,078 | 100% |
