= Omerbegovača =

Omerbegovača Омербеговача
- Village
- Location within Bosnia and Herzegovina
- Coordinates: 44°50′N 18°47′E
- Country: Bosnia and Herzegovina
- Entity: Brčko District

Area
  - Total: 2.31 sq mi (5.97 km^{2})

Population (2013)
  - Total: 1,074
  - Density: 466/sq mi (180/km^{2})
- Time zone: UTC+1 (CET)
  - Summer (DST): UTC+2 (CEST)

Omerbegovača (Serbian Cyrillic: Омербеговача) is a village in the municipality of Brčko, Bosnia and Herzegovina.

== Demographics ==
According to the 2013 census, its population was 1,074.

Ethnicity in 2013
Ethnicity	Number	Percentage
Bosniaks	983	91.5%
Croats	84	7.8%
other/undeclared	7	0.7%
Total	1,074	100%
