= Donji Zovik (Brčko) =

Donji Zovik Доњи Зовик
- Village
- Location within Bosnia and Herzegovina
- Coordinates: 44°46′36″N 18°43′00″E
- Country: Bosnia and Herzegovina
- Entity: Brčko District

Area
  - Total: 2.18 sq mi (5.65 km^{2})

Population (2013)
  - Total: 494
  - Density: 226/sq mi (87.4/km^{2})
- Time zone: UTC+1 (CET)
  - Summer (DST): UTC+2 (CEST)

Donji Zovik (Serbian Cyrillic: Доњи Зовик) is a village in the municipality of Brčko, Bosnia and Herzegovina.

== Demographics ==
According to the 2013 census, its population was 494.

Ethnicity in 2013
Ethnicity	Number	Percentage
Croats	487	98.6%
Serbs	4	0.8%
Bosniaks	2	0.4%
other/undeclared	1	0.2%
Total	494	100%
