= Šatorovići (Brčko) =

Šatorovići Шаторовићи
- Village
- Location within Bosnia and Herzegovina
- Coordinates: 44°46′20″N 18°46′24″E
- Country: Bosnia and Herzegovina
- Entity: Brčko District

Area
  - Total: 3.00 sq mi (7.77 km^{2})

Population (2013)
  - Total: 1,472
  - Density: 491/sq mi (189/km^{2})
- Time zone: UTC+1 (CET)
  - Summer (DST): UTC+2 (CEST)

Šatorovići (Serbian Cyrillic: Шаторовићи) is a village in the municipality of Brčko, Bosnia and Herzegovina. The number of residents is about 2,000.

== Demographics ==
According to the 2013 census, its population was 1,472.

Ethnicity in 2013
Ethnicity	Number	Percentage
Bosniaks	1,470	99.9%
other/undeclared	2	0.1%
Total	1,472	100%
