= Brezik (Brčko) =

Brezik Брезик
- Village
- Location within Bosnia and Herzegovina
- Coordinates: 44°49′40″N 18°50′10″E
- Country: Bosnia and Herzegovina
- Entity: Brčko District

Area
  - Total: 2.54 sq mi (6.57 km^{2})

Population (2013)
  - Total: 601
  - Density: 237/sq mi (91.5/km^{2})
- Time zone: UTC+1 (CET)
  - Summer (DST): UTC+2 (CEST)

Brezik (Serbian Cyrillic: Брезик) is a village in the municipality of Brčko, Bosnia and Herzegovina.

== Demographics ==
According to the 2013 census, its population was 601.

Ethnicity in 2013
Ethnicity	Number	Percentage
Serbs	593	98.7%
Croats	4	0.7%
Bosniaks	1	0.2%
other/undeclared	3	0.5%
Total	601	100%
