= Vukšić Donji =

Vukšić Donji Вукшић Доњи
- Village
- Location within Bosnia and Herzegovina
- Coordinates: 44°54′00″N 18°41′24″E
- Country: Bosnia and Herzegovina
- Entity: Brčko District

Area
  - Total: 2.61 sq mi (6.77 km^{2})

Population (2013)
  - Total: 352
  - Density: 135/sq mi (52.0/km^{2})
- Time zone: UTC+1 (CET)
  - Summer (DST): UTC+2 (CEST)

Vukšić Donji (Serbian Cyrillic: Вукшић Доњи) is a village in the municipality of Brčko, Bosnia and Herzegovina.

== Demographics ==
According to the 2013 census, its population was 352.

Ethnicity in 2013
| Ethnicity | Number | Percentage |
|---|---|---|
| Croats | 350 | 99.4% |
| other/undeclared | 2 | 0.6% |
| Total | 352 | 100% |
