= Bukvik Gornji =

Bukvik Gornji Буквик Горњи
- Village
- Location within Bosnia and Herzegovina
- Coordinates: 44°49′08″N 18°39′04″E
- Country: Bosnia and Herzegovina
- Entity: Brčko District

Area
  - Total: 1.57 sq mi (4.07 km^{2})

Population (2013)
  - Total: 121
  - Density: 77.0/sq mi (29.7/km^{2})
- Time zone: UTC+1 (CET)
  - Summer (DST): UTC+2 (CEST)

Bukvik Gornji (Serbian Cyrillic: Буквик Горњи) is a village in the municipality of Brčko, Bosnia and Herzegovina.

== Demographics ==
According to the 2013 census, its population was 121.

Ethnicity in 2013
Ethnicity	Number	Percentage
Serbs	111	91.7%
Croats	5	4.1%
Bosniaks	2	1.7%
other/undeclared	3	2.5%
Total	121	100%
