= Gornji Zovik (Brčko) =

Gornji Zovik Горњи Зовик
- Village
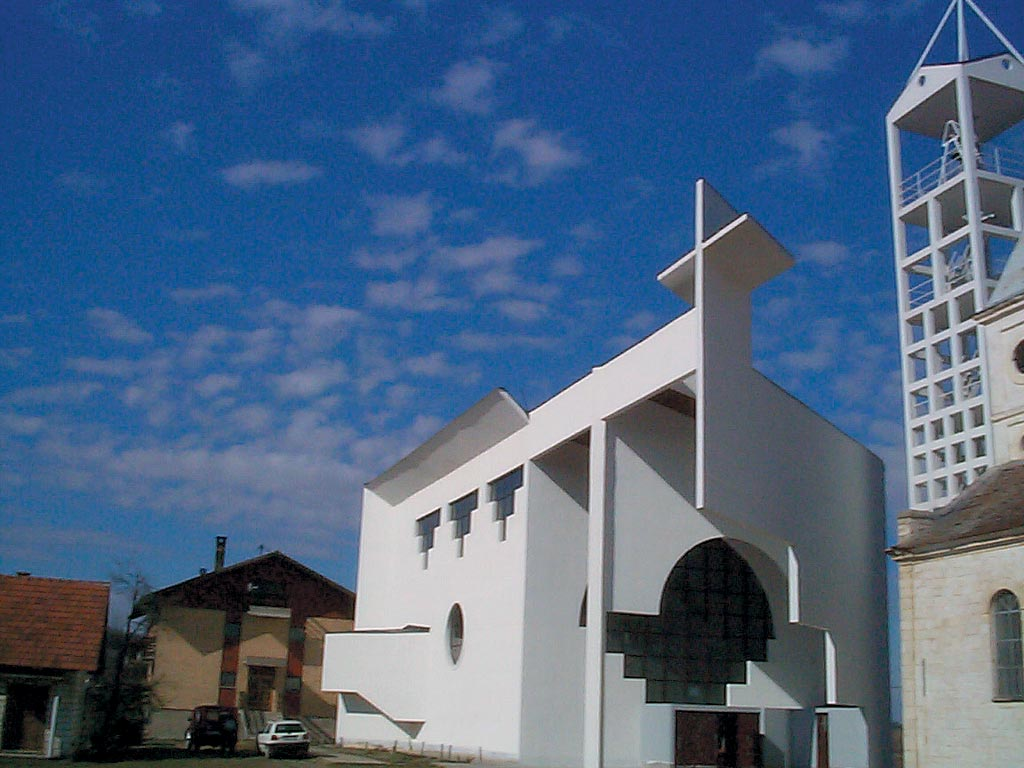

- Location within Bosnia and Herzegovina
- Coordinates: 44°44′59″N 18°43′00″E
- Country: Bosnia and Herzegovina
- Entity: Brčko District

Area
  - Total: 3.79 sq mi (9.82 km^{2})

Population (2013)
  - Total: 1,408
  - Density: 371/sq mi (143/km^{2})
- Time zone: UTC+1 (CET)
  - Summer (DST): UTC+2 (CEST)

Gornji Zovik (Serbian Cyrillic: Горњи Зовик) is a village in the municipality of Brčko, Bosnia and Herzegovina.

== Demographics ==
According to the 2013 census, its population was 1,408.

Ethnicity in 2013
| Ethnicity | Number | Percentage |
|---|---|---|
| Croats | 1,381 | 98.1% |
| Bosniaks | 8 | 0.6% |
| Serbs | 3 | 0.2% |
| other/undeclared | 16 | 1.1% |
| Total | 1,408 | 100% |
