= Trnjaci (Brčko) =

Trnjaci Трњаци
- Village
- Location within Bosnia and Herzegovina
- Coordinates: 44°50′21″N 18°54′38″E
- Country: Bosnia and Herzegovina
- Entity: Brčko District

Area
  - Total: 1.69 sq mi (4.39 km^{2})

Population (2013)
  - Total: 245
  - Density: 145/sq mi (55.8/km^{2})
- Time zone: UTC+1 (CET)
  - Summer (DST): UTC+2 (CEST)

Trnjaci (Serbian Cyrillic: Трњаци) is a village in the municipality of Brčko, Bosnia and Herzegovina.

== Demographics ==
According to the 2013 census, its population was 245.

Ethnicity in 2013
Ethnicity	Number	Percentage
Serbs	239	97.6%
Bosniaks	3	1.2%
Croats	1	0.4%
other/undeclared	2	0.8%
Total	245	100%
