= Bukovac (Brčko) =

Bukovac Буковац
- Village
- Location within Bosnia and Herzegovina
- Coordinates: 44°51′29″N 18°42′22″E
- Country: Bosnia and Herzegovina
- Entity: Brčko District

Area
  - Total: 2.94 sq mi (7.61 km^{2})

Population (2013)
  - Total: 104
  - Density: 35.4/sq mi (13.7/km^{2})
- Time zone: UTC+1 (CET)
  - Summer (DST): UTC+2 (CEST)

Bukovac (Serbian Cyrillic: Буковац) is a village in the municipality of Brčko, Bosnia and Herzegovina.

== Demographics ==
According to the 2013 census, its population was 104.

Ethnicity in 2013
Ethnicity	Number	Percentage
Serbs	76	73.1%
Croats	27	26.0%
other/undeclared	1	1.0%
Total	104	100%
