= Vukšić Gornji =

Vukšić Gornji Вукшић Горњи
- Village
- Location within Bosnia and Herzegovina
- Coordinates: 44°53′N 18°40′E
- Country: Bosnia and Herzegovina
- Entity: Brčko District

Area
  - Total: 3.10 sq mi (8.03 km^{2})

Population (2013)
  - Total: 579
  - Density: 187/sq mi (72.1/km^{2})
- Time zone: UTC+1 (CET)
  - Summer (DST): UTC+2 (CEST)

Vukšić Gornji (Serbian Cyrillic: Вукшић Горњи) is a village in the municipality of Brčko, Bosnia and Herzegovina.

== Demographics ==
According to the 2013 census, its population was 579.

Ethnicity in 2013
Ethnicity	Number	Percentage
Croats	575	99.3%
Bosniaks	2	0.3%
other/undeclared	2	0.3%
Total	579	100%
