= Vučilovac =

Vučilovac Вучиловац
- Village
- Location within Bosnia and Herzegovina
- Coordinates: 44°57′N 18°47′E
- Country: Bosnia and Herzegovina
- Entity: Brčko District

Area
  - Total: 3.27 sq mi (8.47 km^{2})

Population (2013)
  - Total: 254
  - Density: 77.7/sq mi (30.0/km^{2})
- Time zone: UTC+1 (CET)
  - Summer (DST): UTC+2 (CEST)

Vučilovac (Serbian Cyrillic: Вучиловац) is a village in the municipality of Brčko, Bosnia and Herzegovina.

== Demographics ==
According to the 2013 census, its population was 254.

Ethnicity in 2013
Ethnicity	Number	Percentage
Serbs	251	98.8%
Croats	2	0.8%
other/undeclared	1	0.4%
Total	254	100%
