= Čađavac =

Čađavac Чађавац
- Village
- Location within Bosnia and Herzegovina
- Country: Bosnia and Herzegovina
- Entity: Brčko District

Area
  - Total: 0.69 sq mi (1.80 km^{2})

Population (2013)
  - Total: 72
  - Density: 100/sq mi (40/km^{2})
- Time zone: UTC+1 (CET)
  - Summer (DST): UTC+2 (CEST)

Čađavac (Serbian Cyrillic: Чађавац) is a village in the municipality of Brčko, Bosnia and Herzegovina.

== Demographics ==
According to the 2013 census, its population was 72.

Ethnicity in 2013
| Ethnicity | Number | Percentage |
|---|---|---|
| Croats | 62 | 86.1% |
| Bosniaks | 8 | 11.1% |
| other/undeclared | 2 | 2.8% |
| Total | 72 | 100% |
