= Grbavica (Brčko) =

Grbavica Грбавица
- Village
- Location within Bosnia and Herzegovina
- Coordinates: 44°53′02″N 18°45′19″E
- Country: Bosnia and Herzegovina
- Entity: Brčko District

Area
  - Total: 2.44 sq mi (6.31 km^{2})

Population (2013)
  - Total: 1,527
  - Density: 627/sq mi (242/km^{2})
- Time zone: UTC+1 (CET)
  - Summer (DST): UTC+2 (CEST)

Grbavica (Serbian Cyrillic: Грбавица) is a village in Brčko District, Bosnia and Herzegovina.

== Demographics ==
According to the 2013 census, its population was 1,527.

Ethnicity in 2013
Ethnicity	Number	Percentage
Serbs	1,503	98.4%
Croats	13	0.9%
Bosniaks	5	0.3%
other/undeclared	6	0.4%
Total	1,527	100%
