= Laništa =

Laništa Ланишта
- Village
- Location within Bosnia and Herzegovina
- Coordinates: 44°54′13″N 18°39′26″E
- Country: Bosnia and Herzegovina
- Entity: Brčko District

Area
  - Total: 2.15 sq mi (5.56 km^{2})

Population (2013)
  - Total: 450
  - Density: 210/sq mi (81/km^{2})
- Time zone: UTC+1 (CET)
  - Summer (DST): UTC+2 (CEST)

Laništa (Serbian Cyrillic: Ланишта) is a village in the municipality of Brčko, Bosnia and Herzegovina.

== Demographics ==
According to the 2013 census, its population was 450.

Ethnicity in 2013
Ethnicity	Number	Percentage
Croats	445	98.9%
Bosniaks	3	0.7%
other/undeclared	2	0.4%
Total	450	100%
