= Ograđenovac =

Ograđenovac Ограђеновац
- Village
- Location within Bosnia and Herzegovina
- Coordinates: 44°48′N 18°42′E
- Country: Bosnia and Herzegovina
- Entity: Brčko District

Area
  - Total: 1.78 sq mi (4.62 km^{2})

Population (2013)
  - Total: 815
  - Density: 457/sq mi (176/km^{2})
- Time zone: UTC+1 (CET)
  - Summer (DST): UTC+2 (CEST)

Ograđenovac (Serbian Cyrillic: Ограђеновац) is a village in the municipality of Brčko, Bosnia and Herzegovina.

== Demographics ==
According to the 2013 census, its population was 815.

Ethnicity in 2013
Ethnicity	Number	Percentage
Bosniaks	811	99.5%
other/undeclared	4	0.5%
Total	815	100%
