= Ulovići =

Ulovići Уловић
- Village
- Location within Bosnia and Herzegovina
- Coordinates: 44°50′50″N 18°43′16″E
- Country: Bosnia and Herzegovina
- Entity: Brčko District

Area
  - Total: 2.44 sq mi (6.31 km^{2})

Population (2013)
  - Total: 752
  - Density: 309/sq mi (119/km^{2})
- Time zone: UTC+1 (CET)
  - Summer (DST): UTC+2 (CEST)

Church in Ulovići, Brčko District, Bosnia and Herzegovina.

Ulovići (Serbian Cyrillic: Уловић) is a village in the municipality of Brčko, Bosnia and Herzegovina, which used to be named Ulović.

== Demographics ==
According to the 2013 census, its population was 752.

Ethnicity in 2013
Ethnicity	Number	Percentage
Croats	444	59.0%
Bosniaks	237	31.5%
Serbs	69	9.2%
other/undeclared	2	0.3%
Total	752	100%
