= Repino Brdo =

Repino Brdo Репино Брдо
- Village
- Location within Bosnia and Herzegovina
- Coordinates: 44°46′52″N 18°46′22″E
- Country: Bosnia and Herzegovina
- Entity: Brčko District

Area
  - Total: 0.95 sq mi (2.45 km^{2})

Population (2013)
  - Total: 247
  - Density: 261/sq mi (101/km^{2})
- Time zone: UTC+1 (CET)
  - Summer (DST): UTC+2 (CEST)

Repino Brdo (Serbian Cyrillic: Репино Брдо) is a village in the municipality of Brčko, Bosnia and Herzegovina.

== Demographics ==
According to the 2013 census, its population was 247.

Ethnicity in 2013
Ethnicity	Number	Percentage
Bosniaks	246	99.6%
other/undeclared	1	0.4%
Total	247	100%
