= Marković Polje =

Marković Polje Марковић Поље
- Village
- Location within Bosnia and Herzegovina
- Coordinates: 44°55′N 18°42′E
- Country: Bosnia and Herzegovina
- Entity: Brčko District

Area
  - Total: 1.88 sq mi (4.87 km^{2})

Population (2013)
  - Total: 370
  - Density: 200/sq mi (76/km^{2})
- Time zone: UTC+1 (CET)
  - Summer (DST): UTC+2 (CEST)

Marković Polje (Serbian Cyrillic: Марковић Поље) is a village in the municipality of Brčko, Bosnia and Herzegovina.

== Demographics ==
According to the 2013 census, its population was 370.

Ethnicity in 2013
Ethnicity	Number	Percentage
Croats	283	76.5%
Serbs	82	22.2%
Bosniaks	4	1.1%
other/undeclared	1	0.3%
Total	370	100%
