= Ćoseti =

Ćoseti Ћосети
- Village
- Location within Bosnia and Herzegovina
- Coordinates: 44°47′N 18°40′E
- Country: Bosnia and Herzegovina
- Entity: Brčko District

Area
  - Total: 1.99 sq mi (5.15 km^{2})

Population (2013)
  - Total: 732
  - Density: 368/sq mi (142/km^{2})
- Time zone: UTC+1 (CET)
  - Summer (DST): UTC+2 (CEST)

Ćoseti (Serbian Cyrillic: Ћосети) is a village in the municipality of Brčko, Bosnia and Herzegovina.

A small village just outside Čande and Maoča which are also in the Brčko District. The village during the 1992-1995 war was not hit as hard as the surrounding cities of Brčko District. New government funding has been requested in order to create better roads and support the new school that was built back in 2009. There are a few people that are from the United States that live there due to them coming to America during the warfare starting in 1992.

Džemat Ćoseti is located 17 km south of Brčko. With 100 households, it belongs to the category of smaller congregations.

There are two mosques in the congregation, an old mosque with a wooden minaret built way back in 1936 and a new under-domed mosque with a high minaret with two sherefas. The old mosque was closed in 1963 during the SFRY, but was restored and opened in 2014. In the old mosque, the Jumma prayer is offered every last Friday of the month. All five daily prayers are regularly performed in the new mosque, and maktab classes are held two days a week, on Saturdays and Sundays.

Imams in this congregation were: Ramadan ef. Omerović, Ibrahim ef. Hukičević, Nedim ef. Hamzabegović, Besim ef. Hodžić, Šefik ef. Ribić and Faruk ef. Alić, the current imam of the congregation. From the waqf property, in addition to the old and new mosques, the congregation owns an imam's house, gasulhana, cemetery and an arable field.

The imam, khatib and muallim of Ćoseti cobgregation is Faruk ef. Alić. He was born to his father Muhedin on January 2, 1964 in Crniš, Tutin municipality. He graduated from Alaudin madrasa in Priština in 1984. He began his imam career in the Nahvioci congregation – MIZ Čelic, and then on September 25, 1988, he moved to the Ćoseti congregagation.

== Demographics ==
According to the 2013 census, its population was 732.

Ethnicity in 2013
Ethnicity	Number	Percentage
Bosniaks	668	100%
[
other/undeclared	62	8.5%
Total	732	100%
