= Dubravice Gornje =

Dubravice Gornje Дубравице Горње
- Village
- Location within Bosnia and Herzegovina
- Coordinates: 44°46′N 18°48′E
- Country: Bosnia and Herzegovina
- Entity: Brčko District

Area
  - Total: 3.63 sq mi (9.39 km^{2})

Population (2013)
  - Total: 161
  - Density: 44.4/sq mi (17.1/km^{2})
- Time zone: UTC+1 (CET)
  - Summer (DST): UTC+2 (CEST)

Dubravice Gornje (Serbian Cyrillic: Дубравице Горње) is a village in the municipality of Brčko, Bosnia and Herzegovina.

== Demographics ==
According to the 2013 census, its population was 161.

Ethnicity in 2013
Ethnicity	Number	Percentage
Serbs	150	93.2%
Croats	11	6.8%
Total	161	100%
