= Sandići =

Sandići Сандићи
- Village
- Location within Bosnia and Herzegovina
- Coordinates: 44°49′56″N 18°53′17″E
- Country: Bosnia and Herzegovina
- Entity: Brčko District

Area
  - Total: 3.74 sq mi (9.69 km^{2})

Population (2013)
  - Total: 430
  - Density: 110/sq mi (44/km^{2})
- Time zone: UTC+1 (CET)
  - Summer (DST): UTC+2 (CEST)

Sandići (Serbian Cyrillic: Сандићи) is a village in the municipality of Brčko, Bosnia and Herzegovina. František Pubička (1779 - 1801), Czech Jesuit, bohemian historian and dean of the Faculty of Philosophy in his extensive work Chronological history of Bohemia under the Slavs published in the original in German and titled: " 1770–1801:Chronologische geschichte Böhmens." cites the place as "an early Slavic settlement and town of the Sandići noble family with relatives in a fortified city of Bobovac."

It is assumed that a village and its adjoining area was named by or after Sandić noble family. The family originates possibly from the south of Bosnia and Herzegovina, the area between Herzegovina and Old Herzegovina, in the early 15th century.

== Demographics ==
According to the 2013 census, its population was 430.

Ethnicity in 2013
Ethnicity	Number	Percentage
Serbs	427	99.3%
Croats	3	0.7%
Total	430	100%
