= Brka =

Brka Брка
- Village
- Location within Bosnia and Herzegovina
- Country: Bosnia and Herzegovina
- Entity: Brčko District

Area
  - Total: 5.58 sq mi (14.44 km^{2})

Population (2013)
  - Total: 2,234
  - Density: 400.7/sq mi (154.7/km^{2})
- Time zone: UTC+1 (CET)
  - Summer (DST): UTC+2 (CEST)

Brka (Serbian Cyrillic: Брка) is a village in the municipality of Brčko, Bosnia and Herzegovina. It is also a name of the river, right tributary of river Sava, flowing through municipality of Brčko and emptying into Sava within city limits of Brčko.

== Demographics ==
According to the 2013 census, its population was 2,234.

Ethnicity in 2013
Ethnicity	Number	Percentage
Bosniaks	2,180	97.6%
Serbs	38	1.7%
Croats	5	0.2%
other/undeclared	11	0.5%
Total	2,234	100%
