= Boderište =

Boderište Бодериште
- Village
- Location within Bosnia and Herzegovina
- Coordinates: 44°48′N 18°47′E
- Country: Bosnia and Herzegovina
- Entity: Brčko District

Area
  - Total: 4.32 sq mi (11.19 km^{2})

Population (2013)
  - Total: 661
  - Density: 153/sq mi (59.1/km^{2})
- Time zone: UTC+1 (CET)
  - Summer (DST): UTC+2 (CEST)

Boderište (Serbian Cyrillic: Бодериште) is a village in the municipality of Brčko, Bosnia and Herzegovina.

== Demographics ==
According to the 2013 census, its population was 661.

Ethnicity in 2013
Ethnicity	Number	Percentage
Croats	655	99.1%
Bosniaks	6	0.9%
Total	661	100%
