= Islamovac =

Islamovac Исламовац
- Village
- Location within Bosnia and Herzegovina
- Coordinates: 44°45′N 18°39′E
- Country: Bosnia and Herzegovina
- Entity: Brčko District

Area
  - Total: 3.52 sq mi (9.11 km^{2})

Population (2013)
  - Total: 64
  - Density: 18/sq mi (7.0/km^{2})
- Time zone: UTC+1 (CET)
  - Summer (DST): UTC+2 (CEST)

Islamovac (Serbian Cyrillic: Исламовац) is a village in the municipality of Brčko, Bosnia and Herzegovina.

== Etymology ==
The name is derived from the word Islam, which is the name of an Abrahamic religion practiced by majority of the village's population. Lots of land is owned in Islamovac by the Sahovic family.

== Demographics ==
According to the 2013 census, its population was 64.

Ethnicity in 2013
Ethnicity	Number	Percentage
Bosniaks	61	95.3%
Croats	1	1.6%
other/undeclared	2	3.1%
Total	64	100%
