= Slijepčevići =

Slijepčevići Слијепчевићи
- Village
- Location within Bosnia and Herzegovina
- Coordinates: 44°49′10″N 18°54′30″E
- Country: Bosnia and Herzegovina
- Entity: Brčko District

Area
  - Total: 2.42 sq mi (6.26 km^{2})

Population (2013)
  - Total: 298
  - Density: 123/sq mi (47.6/km^{2})
- Time zone: UTC+1 (CET)
  - Summer (DST): UTC+2 (CEST)

Slijepčevići (Serbian Cyrillic: Слијепчевићи) is a village in the municipality of Brčko, Bosnia and Herzegovina.

== Demographics ==
According to the 2013 census, its population was 298.

Ethnicity in 2013
Ethnicity	Number	Percentage
Serbs	295	99.0%
Bosniaks	2	0.7%
Croats	1	0.3%
Total	298	100%
