= Gajevi (Brčko) =

Gajevi Гајеви
- Village
- Location within Bosnia and Herzegovina
- Coordinates: 44°48′25″N 18°38′33″E
- Country: Bosnia and Herzegovina
- Entity: Brčko District

Area
  - Total: 1.30 sq mi (3.37 km^{2})

Population (2013)
  - Total: 103
  - Density: 79.2/sq mi (30.6/km^{2})
- Time zone: UTC+1 (CET)
  - Summer (DST): UTC+2 (CEST)

Gajevi (Serbian Cyrillic: Гајеви) is a village in the municipality of Brčko, Bosnia and Herzegovina.

== Demographics ==
According to the 2013 census, its population was 103.

Ethnicity in 2013
Ethnicity	Number	Percentage
Serbs	88	85.4%
Croats	3	2.9%
Bosniaks	2	1.9%
other/undeclared	10	9.7%
Total	103	100%
