= Gredice (Brčko) =

Gredice Гредице
- Village
- Location within Bosnia and Herzegovina
- Coordinates: 44°51′02″N 18°50′41″E
- Country: Bosnia and Herzegovina
- Entity: Brčko District

Area
  - Total: 2.67 sq mi (6.91 km^{2})

Population (2013)
  - Total: 1,109
  - Density: 416/sq mi (160/km^{2})
- Time zone: UTC+1 (CET)
  - Summer (DST): UTC+2 (CEST)

Gredice (Serbian Cyrillic: Гредице) is a village in the municipality of Brčko, Bosnia and Herzegovina.

== Demographics ==
According to the 2013 census, its population was 1,109.

Ethnicity in 2013
Ethnicity	Number	Percentage
Serbs	1,046	94.3%
Croats	55	5.0%
Bosniaks	2	0.2%
other/undeclared	6	0.5%
Total	1,109	100%
