= Brčko District =

Self-governing administrative unit in Bosnia and Herzegovina

Brčko District of Bosnia and Herzegovina Brčko distrikt Bosne i Hercegovine Брчко дистрикт Босне и Херцеговине
- Self-governing condominium of the Federation of Bosnia and Herzegovina and Republika Srpska
- Location of Brčko District within Bosnia and Herzegovina
- Coordinates: 44°52′0″N 18°47′0″E
- Country: Bosnia and Herzegovina
- Established by final arbitration decision: 5 March 1999
- Statute took effect: 8 March 2000
- Seat: Brčko

Government
  - Mayor: Siniša Milić (SNSD)
  - President of the Assembly: Damir Bulčević (NiP)
  - International Supervisor (Note: Brcko international supervision suspended since 23 May 2012): Louis J. Crishock

Area
  - Total: 493 km^{2} (190 sq mi)

Population (2013)
  - Total: 83,516
  - Estimate (2025): 79,949
  - Density: 169/km^{2} (439/sq mi)
- Time zone: UTC+1 (CET)
  - Summer (DST): UTC+2 (CEST)
- Postal code: 76100 (Pošte Srpske); 76120 (BH Pošta)
- Area code: (+387) 49
- ISO 3166 code: BA-BRC
- HDI (2022): 0.797 high · (5th)
- Website: Government website, Assembly website

Brčko District (Serbo-Croatian: Brčko distrikt / Брчко дистрикт), officially the Brčko District of Bosnia and Herzegovina (Serbo-Croatian: Brčko distrikt Bosne i Hercegovine / Брчко дистрикт Босне и Херцеговине), is a self-governing administrative unit in north-eastern Bosnia and Herzegovina.

Officially a condominium of the Federation of Bosnia and Herzegovina and Republika Srpska, it was formed in 1999 to reflect the multi-ethnic nature of Brčko and the surrounding areas and their special status within the newly independent Bosnia and Herzegovina. In practice, it functions as a local self-government area, much like the other municipalities in the country. The seat of the district is the city of Brčko.

== History ==
Map of the District

Dayton boundary lines before the formation of the Brčko District

The Brčko District was established after an arbitration process undertaken by the High Representative for Bosnia and Herzegovina. According to the Dayton Peace Accords, however, the process could only arbitrate the disputed portion of the Inter-Entity Boundary Line (IEBL). The Brčko District was formed of the entire territory of the former Brčko municipality, of which 48% (including Brčko city) was in the newly formed Republika Srpska, while 52% was in the old Federation of Bosnia and Herzegovina.

Brčko was the only element in the Dayton Peace Agreement that was not finalized at the time. The arbitration agreement was later finalized in March 1999, resulting in a "district" that was to be administrated by an American Brčko International Supervisor. Since 2006, Principal Deputy High Representative has taken over the Brcko supervisor role.

In the 1990s, the Arizona Market was created at the intersection of the IFOR north-south "Arizona" road and the east–west Posavina Corridor roads, bordering today's district, and became a commercial success.

The first Brčko International Supervisor arrived in April 1997. Up to that time, the Organization for Security and Co-operation in Europe (OSCE) had a modest office headed by Randolph Hampton. During the interim time before the District of Brčko could be represented post-arbitration agreement, local elections were held, and humanitarian relief was provided with cooperation from the United States Agency for International Development (USAID) and ECHO. The District became known as a center for different state-building programs run by foreign governments, particularly the United States.

In 2006, under the Supervisory Order, all "Entity legislation in Brčko District and the IEBL" was abolished. The ruling made by the Brčko Supervisor Susan Johnson abolished all Entity Laws in the District, as well as the Entity Border Line. The ruling made the Laws of the District paramount within the District, and the Laws of the State of Bosnia and Herzegovina, both Federation and Serb Republic, including the laws of the former Socialist Republic of Bosnia and Herzegovina ceased to have legal effect there.

Following a Peace Implementation Council (PIC) meeting on 23 May 2012, it was decided to suspend, not terminate, the mandate of the Brčko International Supervisor. The Brčko Arbitral Tribunal, together with the suspended Brčko Supervision, continues to exist. Also in 2012, the legislature of Bosnia and Herzegovina passed a law that required citizens to declare which entity (Federation or Republika Srpska) they belonged to before they could vote in national elections. This was problematic in Brčko District as many people did not wish to belong to either.

The government of Republika Srpska resumed operation in the district in 2012. Despite actions of the government of Republika Srpska, change of the autonomous status of Brčko District would require a change in the constitution of Bosnia and Herzegovina, an event unlikely to occur.

== Settlements ==
- Bijela
- Boće
- Boderište
- Brčko
- Brezik
- Brezovo Polje
- Brka
- Brod
- Bukovac
- Bukvik Donji
- Bukvik Gornji
- Buzekara
- Cerik
- Čađavac
- Čande
- Čoseta
- Donji Rahić
- Donji Zovik
- Dubrave
- Dubravice Donje
- Dubravice Gornje
- Gajevi
- Gorice
- Gornji Rahić
- Gornji Zovik
- Grbavica
- Gredice
- Islamovac
- Krbeta
- Ivici
- Krepšić
- Laništa
- Lukavac
- Maoča
- Marković Polje
- Ograđenovac
- Omerbegovača
- Palanka
- Popovo Polje
- Potočari
- Rašljani
- Ražljevo
- Repino Brdo
- Sandići
- Skakava Donja
- Skakava Gornja
- Slijepčevići
- Stanovi
- Šatorovići
- Štrepci
- Trnjaci
- Ulice
- Ulović
- Vitanovići Donji
- Vitanovići Gornji
- Vučilovac
- Vujičići
- Vukšić Donji
- Vukšić Gornji

== Demographics ==
Brčko District comprises 1% of the land area of Bosnia and Herzegovina, and is home to 2.37% of the country's total population.

=== Population ===
Population of settlements – Brčko District
	Settlement	2013.	1991.	1981.	1971.	1961.	1953.	1948.
	Total	83,516	87,627	82,768	74,771	62,952	65,078	49,969
1	Bijela	1,923	2,539					
2	Boće	1,270	1,253					
3	Boderište	661	965					
4	Brčko	39,893	41,406	31,437	25,337	17,949		
5	Brezik	601	413					
6	Brezovo Polje	1,292	1,393					
7	Brezovo Polje Selo	251	335					
8	Brka	2,234	2,044					
9	Brod	1,286	1,042					
10	Bukovac	104	364					
11	Bukvik Donji	97	212					
12	Bukvik Gornji	121	378					
13	Buzekara	268	430					
14	Cerik	233	280					
15	Čađavac	72	74					
16	Čande	321	377					
17	Čoseta	732	507					
18	Donji Rahić	366	647					
19	Donji Zovik	494	481					
20	Dubrave	1,463	1,338					
21	Dubravice Donje	315	396					
22	Dubravice Gornje	161	319					
23	Gajevi	103	196					
24	Gorice	654	1,097					
25	Gornji Rahić	3,403	2,167					
26	Gornji Zovik	1,408	1,569					
27	Grbavica	1,527	557					
28	Gredice	1,109	303					
29	Islamovac	64	105					
30	Krbeta	175	244					
31	Krepšić	696	1,156					
32	Laništa	450	656					
33	Lukavac	52	225					
34	Maoča	3,030	2,886					
35	Marković Polje	370	470					
36	Ograđenovac	815	734					
37	Omerbegovača	1,074	895					
38	Palanka	1,439	1,394					
39	Popovo Polje	155	248					
40	Potočari	1,063	893					
41	Rašljani	1,078	1,155					
42	Ražljevo	233	341					
43	Repino Brdo	247	246					
44	Sandići	430	420					
45	Skakava Donja	2,037	2,272					
46	Skakava Gornja	1,352	1,737					
47	Slijepčevići	298	371					
48	Stanovi	238	353					
49	Šatorovići	1,472	1,238					
50	Štrepci	712	861					
51	Trnjaci	245	313					
52	Ulice	892	1,266					
53	Ulovići	752	912					
54	Vitanovići Donji	396	419					
55	Vitanovići Gornji	159	286					
56	Vučilovac	254	700					
57	Vujičić	45	284					
58	Vukšić Donji	352	644					
59	Vukšić Gornji	579	821					

=== Ethnic groups ===
The ethnic composition of Brčko District:

Ethnic group	1961 census		1971 census		1981 census		1991 census		2013 census	
Ethnic group	Number	%	Number	%	Number	%	Number	%	Number	%
Bosniaks	16,484	26.19%	30,181	40.36%	32,434	39.19%	38,617	44.07%	35,381	42.36%
Serbs	17,897	28.43%	17,709	23.68%	16,707	20.19%	18,128	20.69%	28,884	34.58%
Croats	21,994	34.94%	24,925	33.34%	23,975	28.97%	22,252	25.39%	17,252	20.66%
Yugoslavs	5,904	9.38%	1,086	1.45%	8,342	10.08%	5,731	6.54%		
Others	673	1.07%	870	1.16%	1,310	1.58%	2,899	3.31%	1,999	2.39%
Total	62,952		74,771		82,768		87,627		83,516	

1961 census

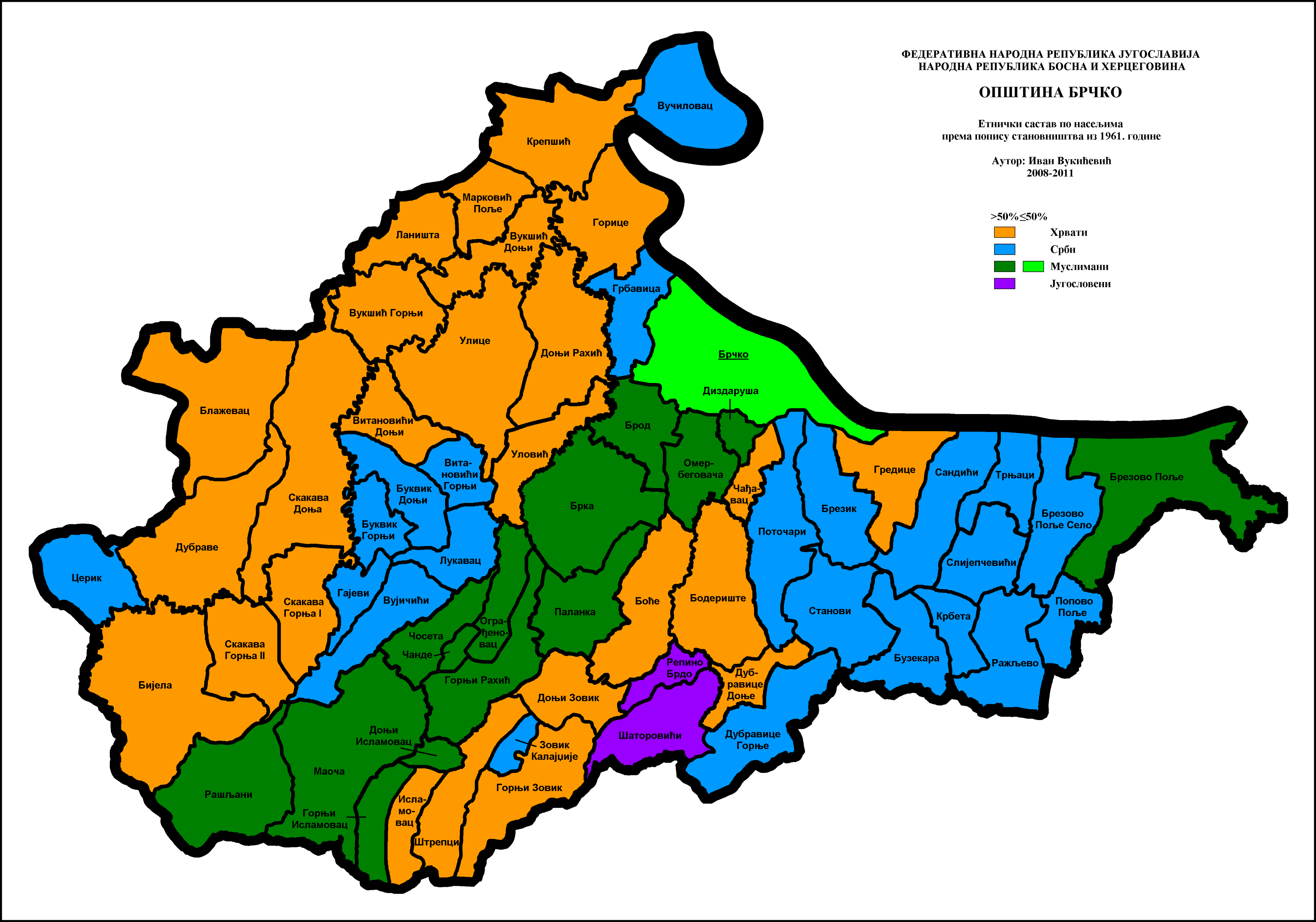
Ethnic structure of Brčko by settlements 1961

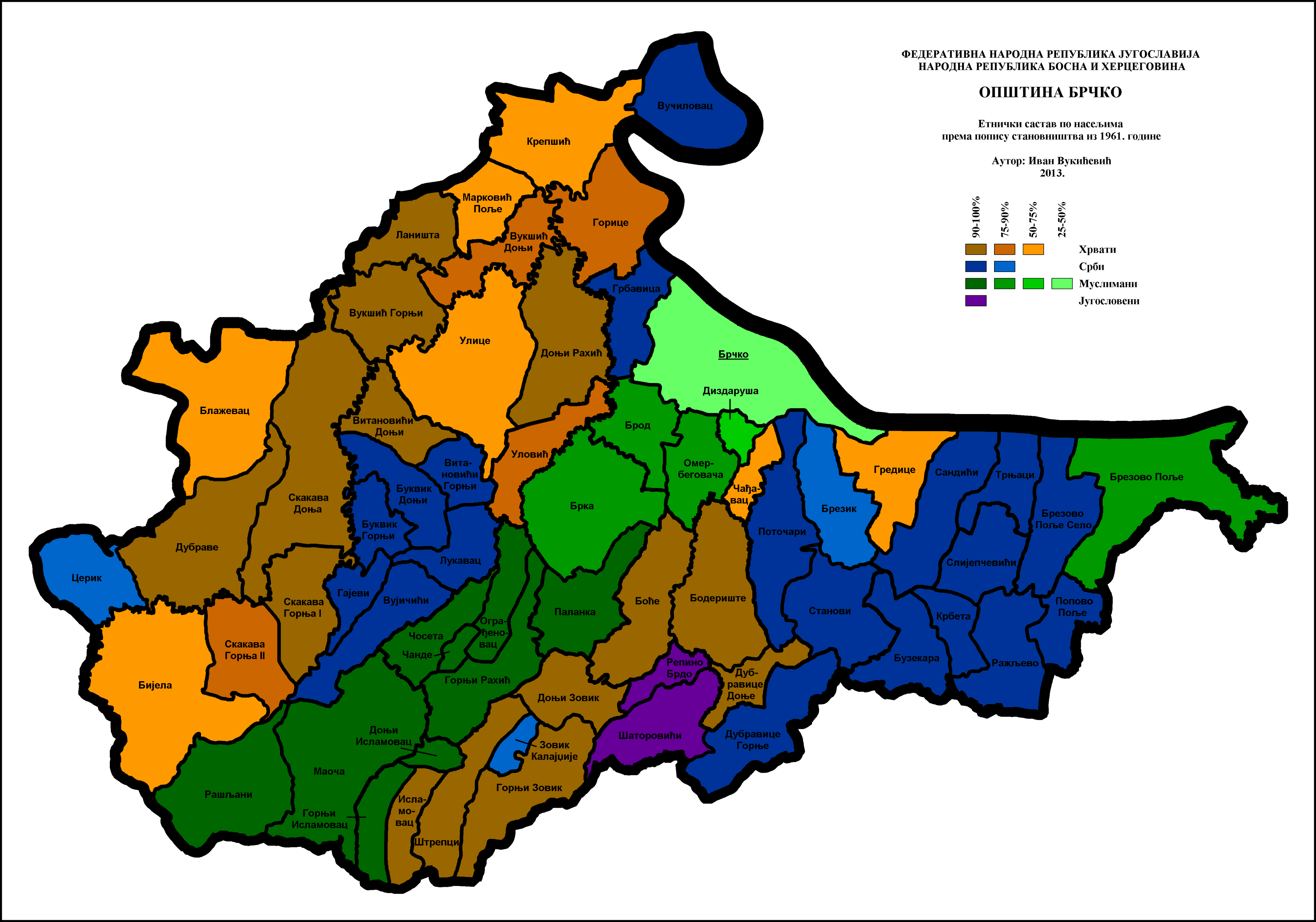
Ethnic structure of Brčko by settlements 1961

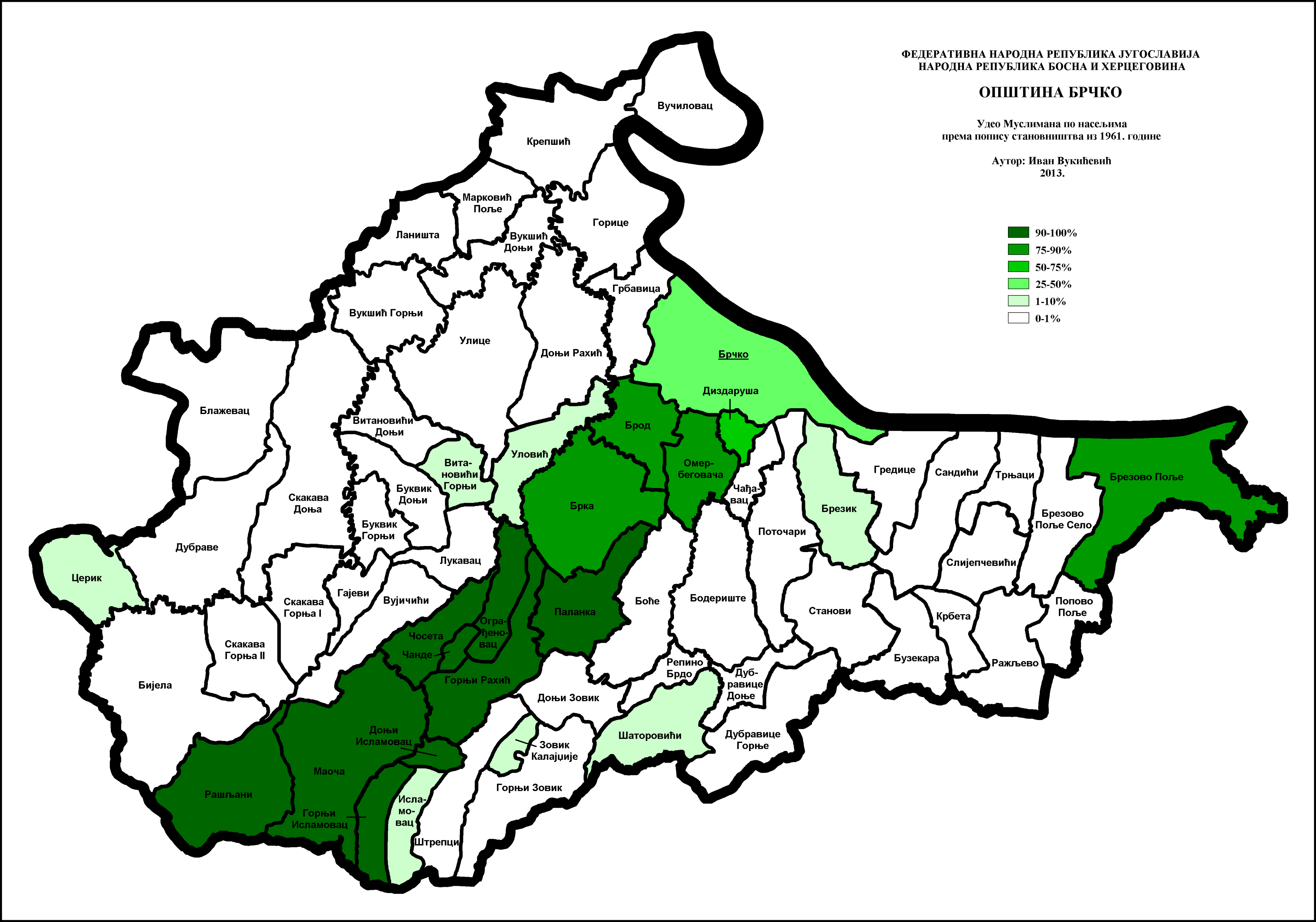
Share of Bosniaks in Brčko by settlements 1961

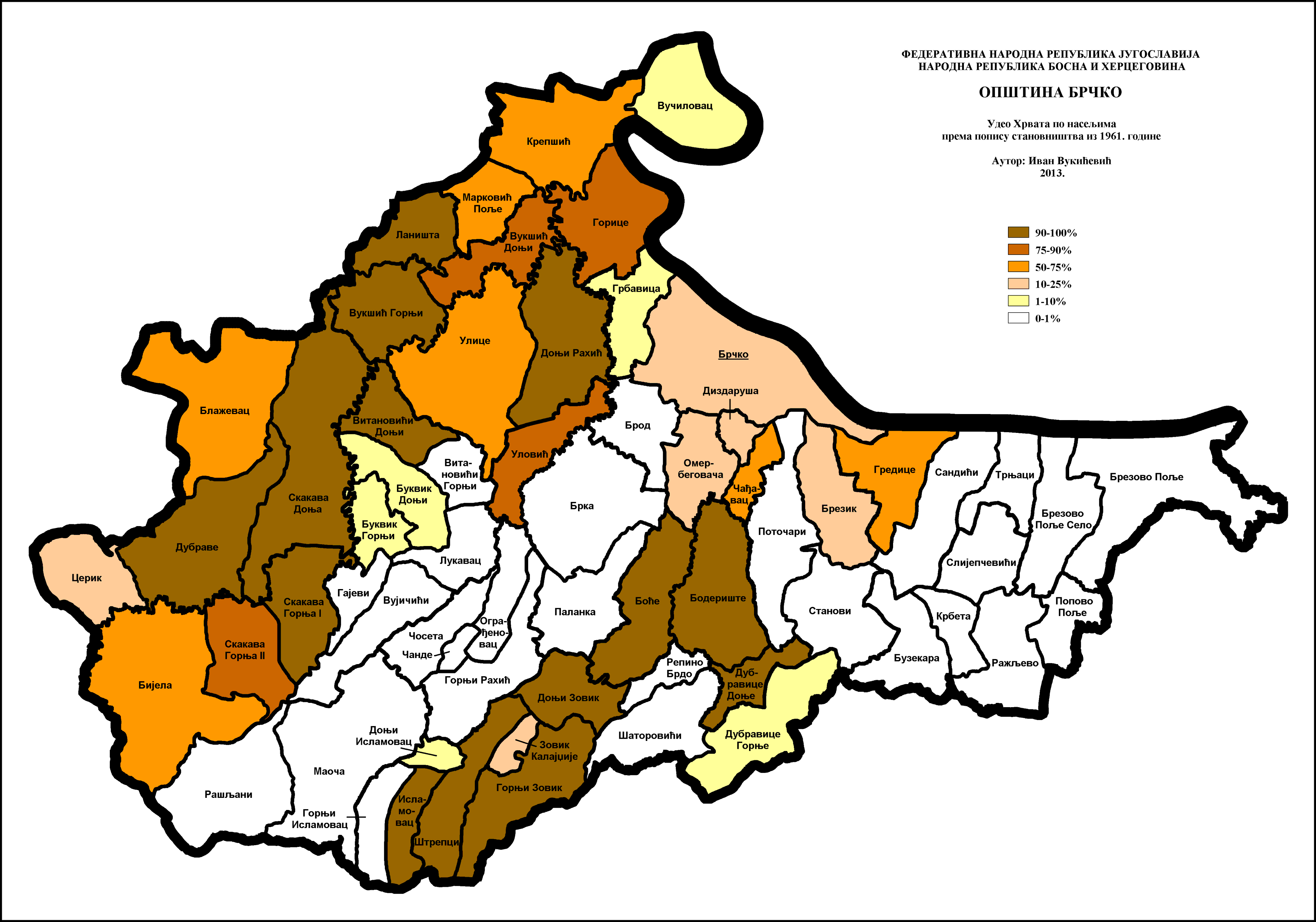
Share of Croats in Brčko by settlements 1961

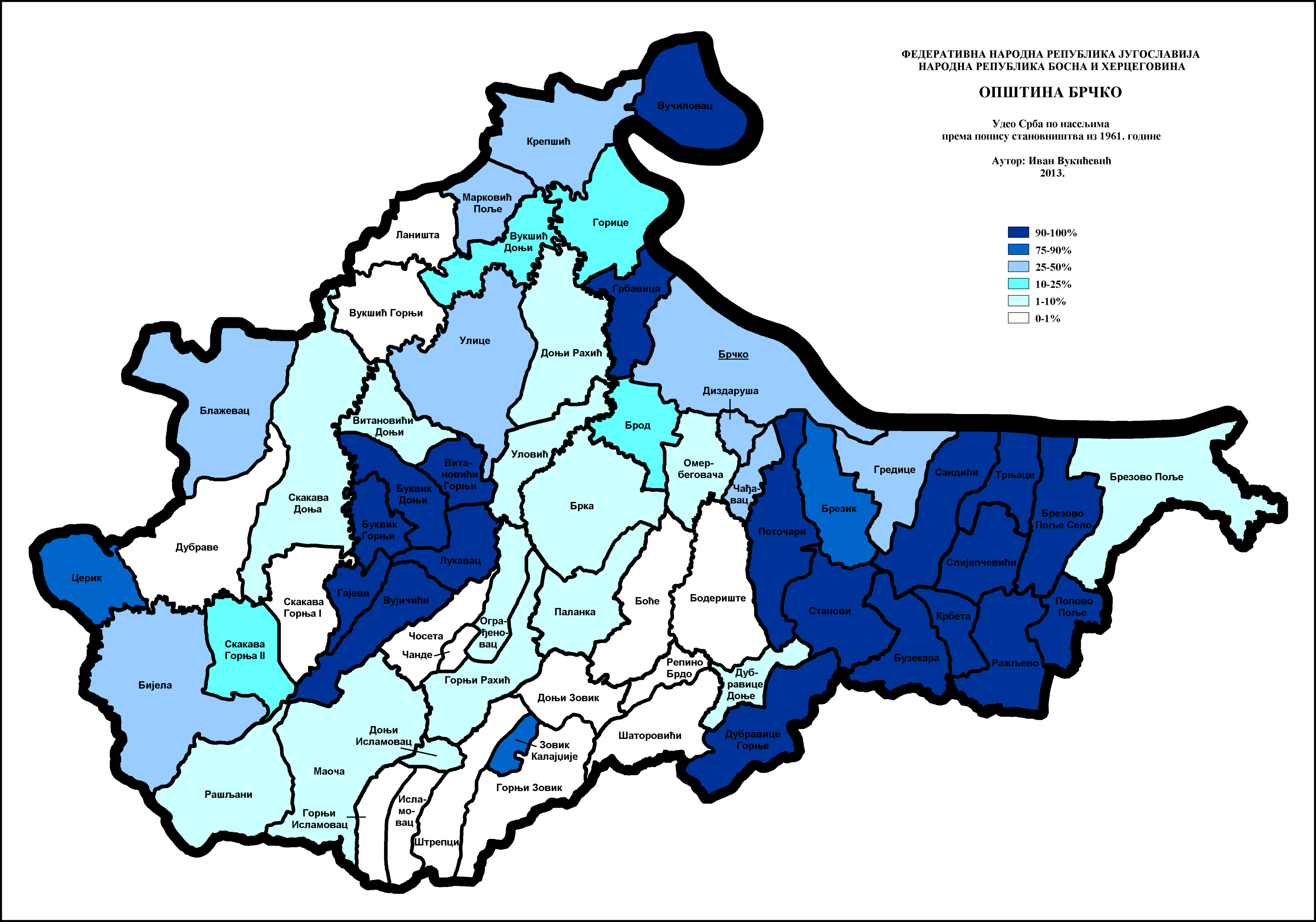
Share of Serbs in Brčko by settlements 1961

1971 census

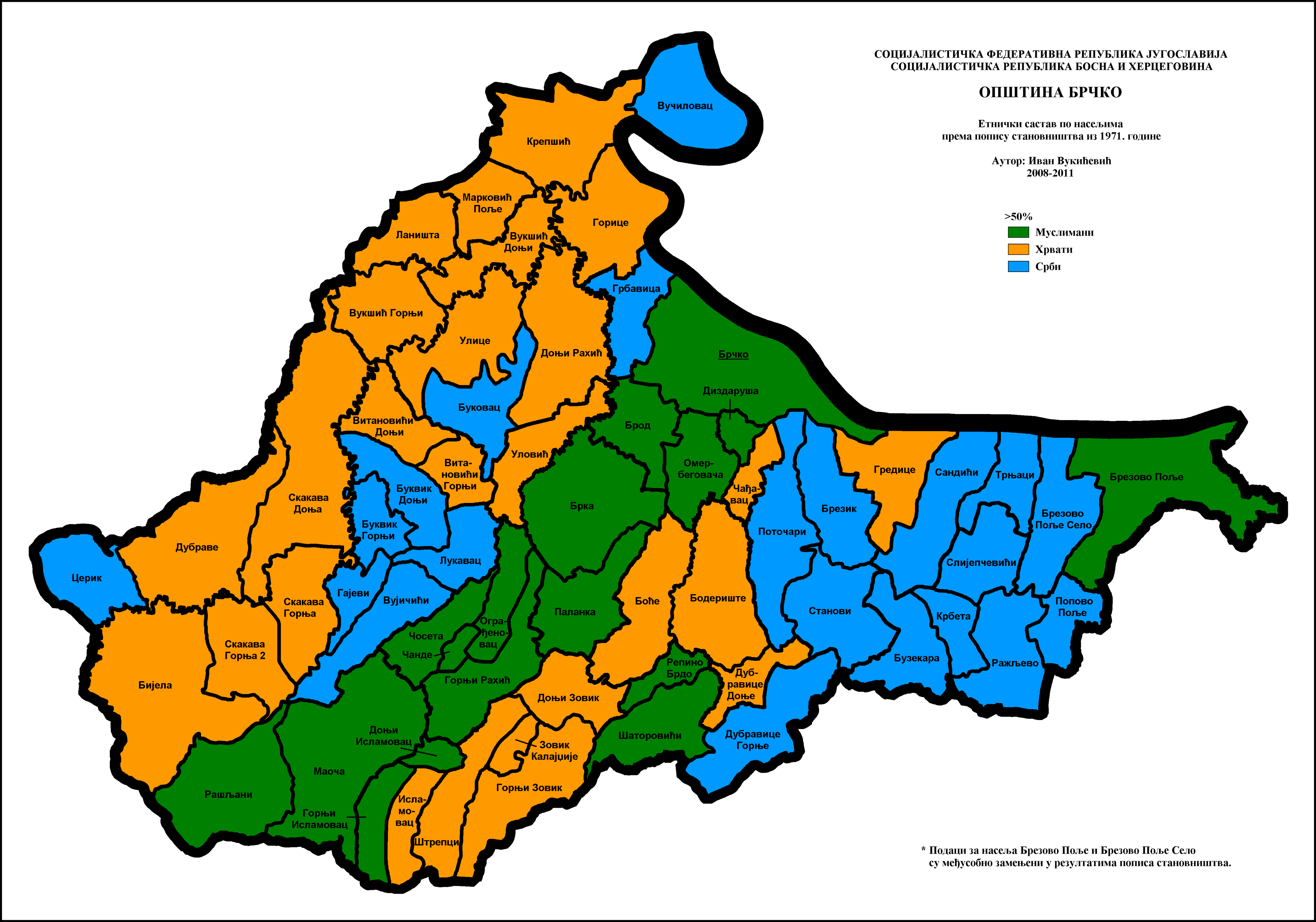
Ethnic structure of Brčko by settlements 1971

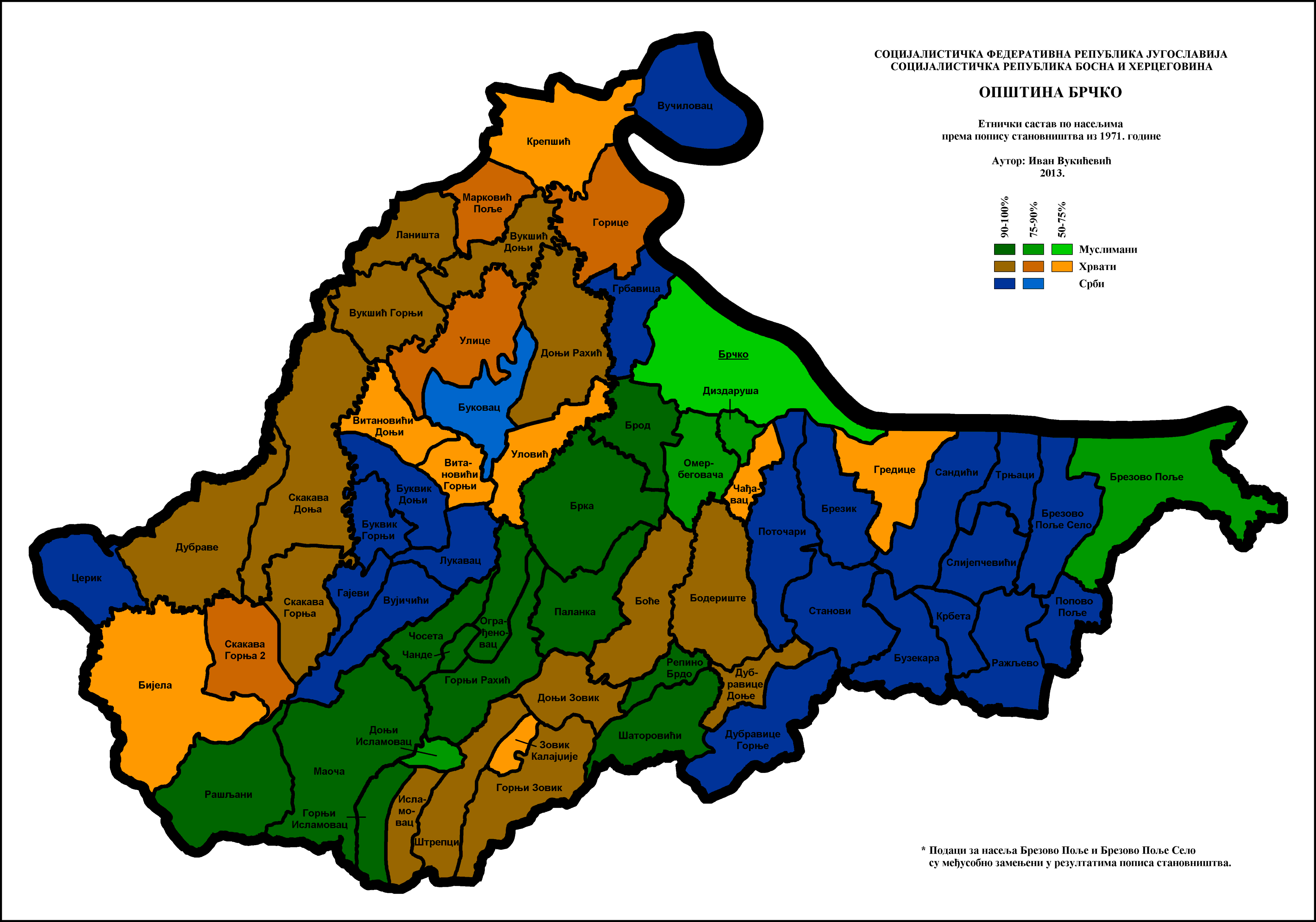
Ethnic structure of Brčko by settlements 1971

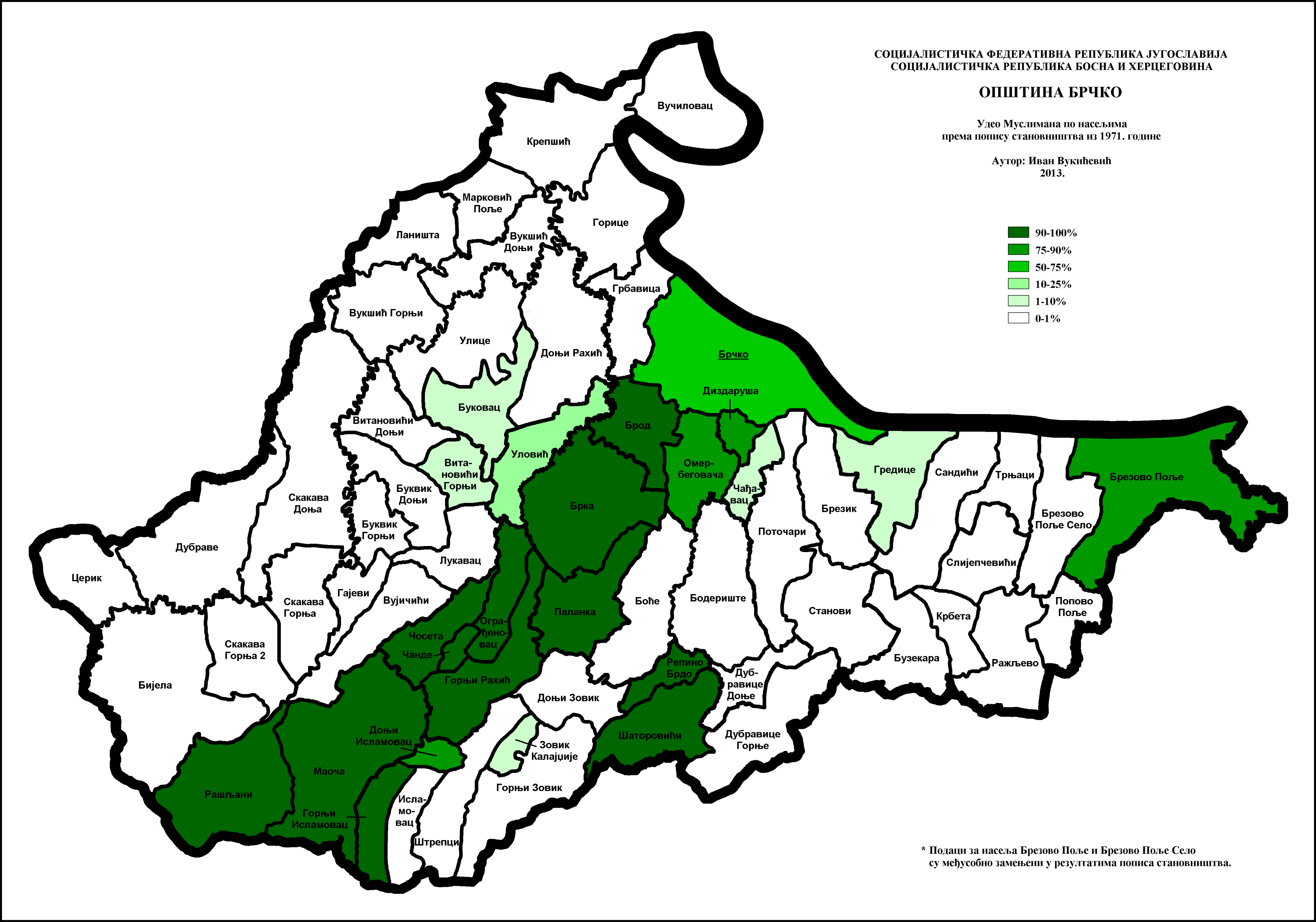
Share of Bosniaks in Brčko by settlements 1971

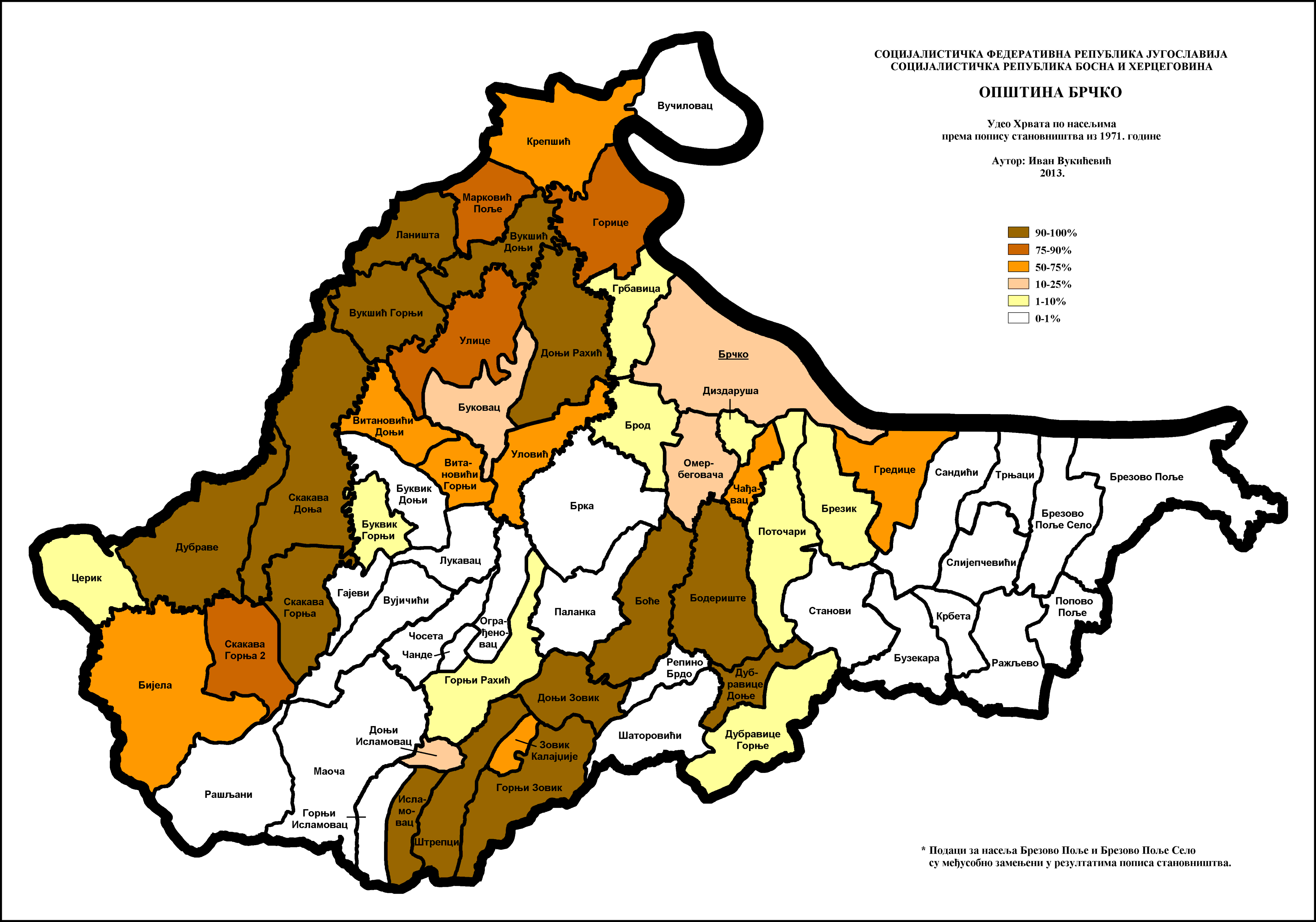
Share of Croats in Brčko by settlements 1971

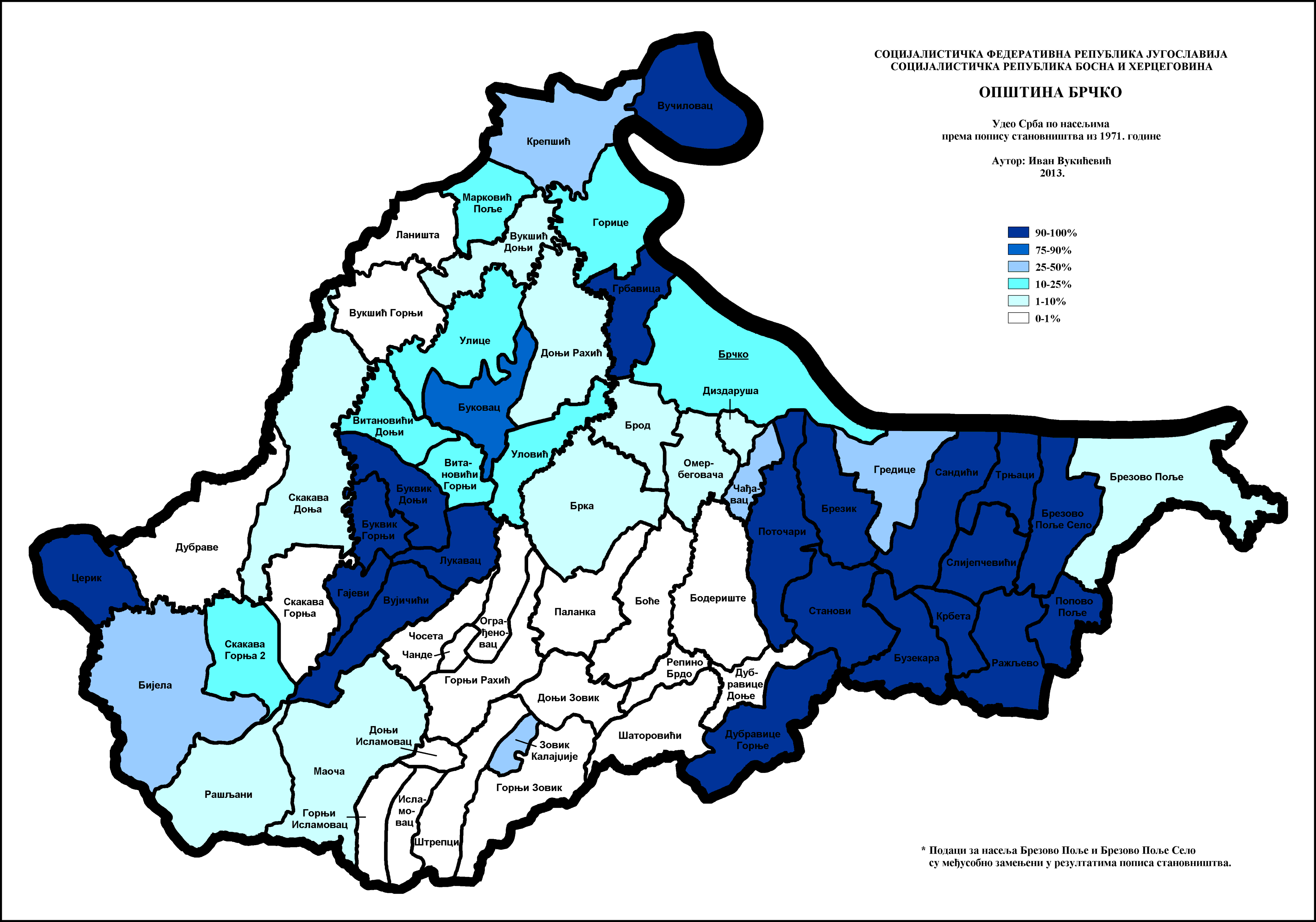
Share of Serbs in Brčko by settlements 1971

1981 census

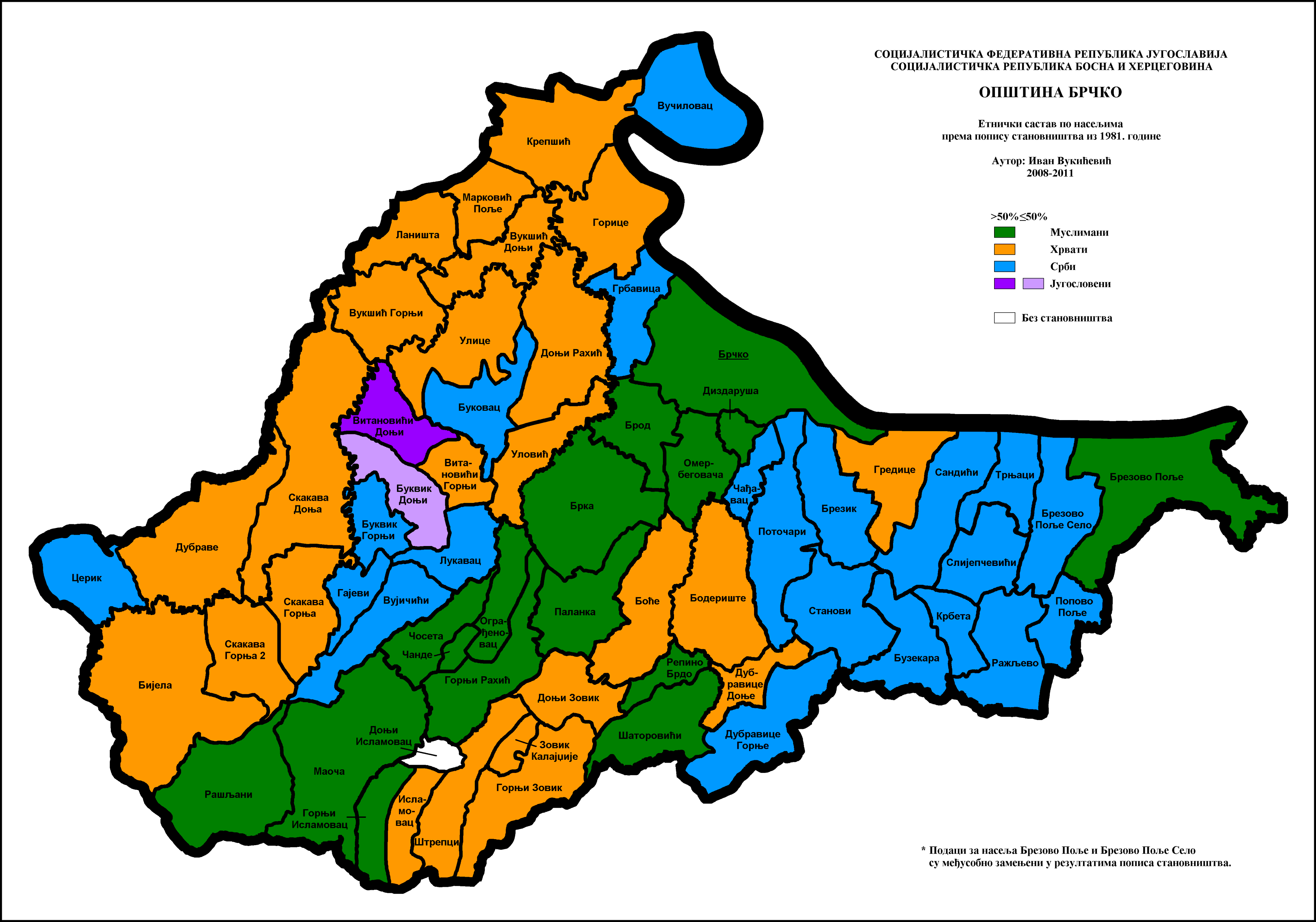
Ethnic structure of Brčko by settlements 1981

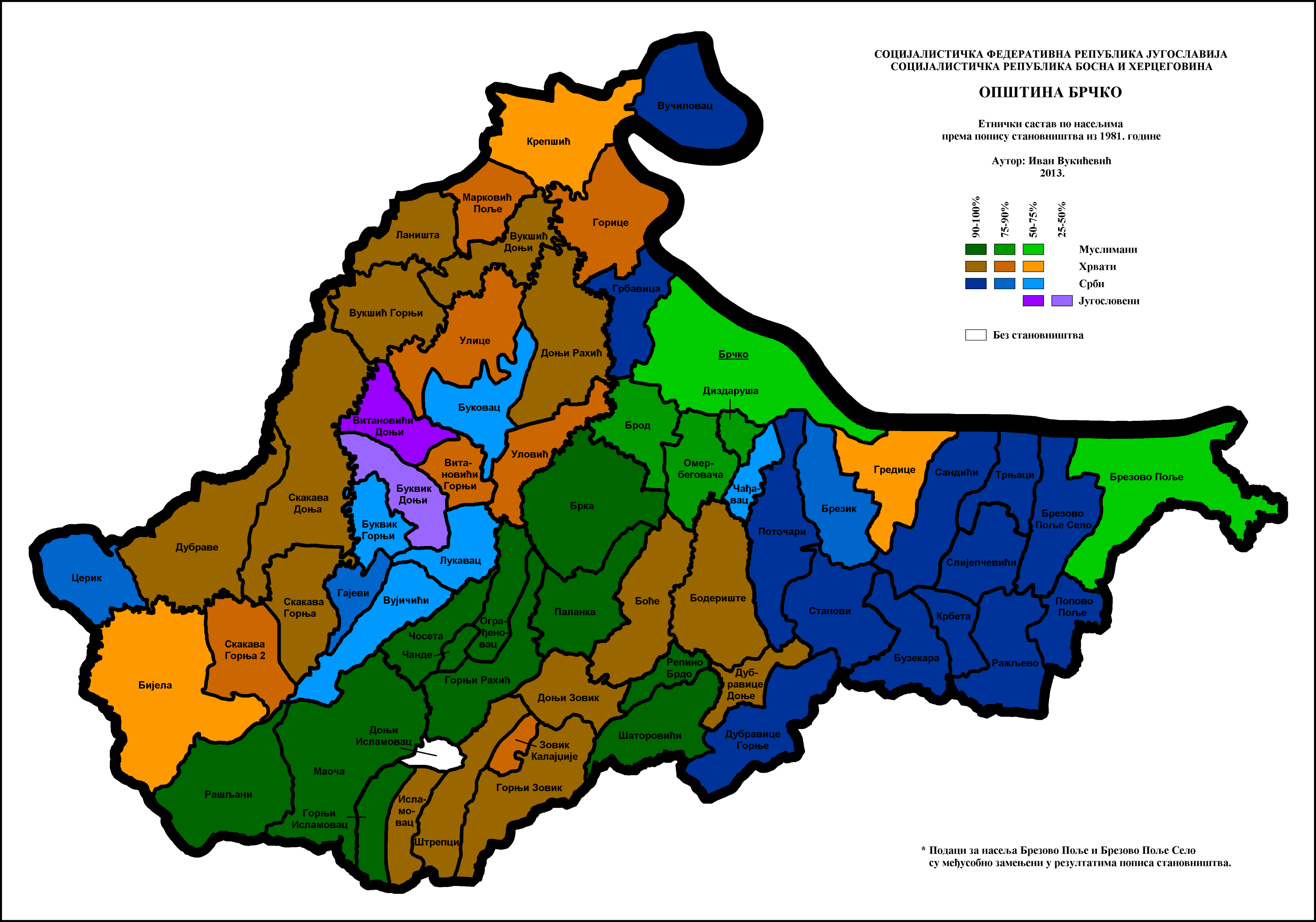
Ethnic structure of Brčko by settlements 1981

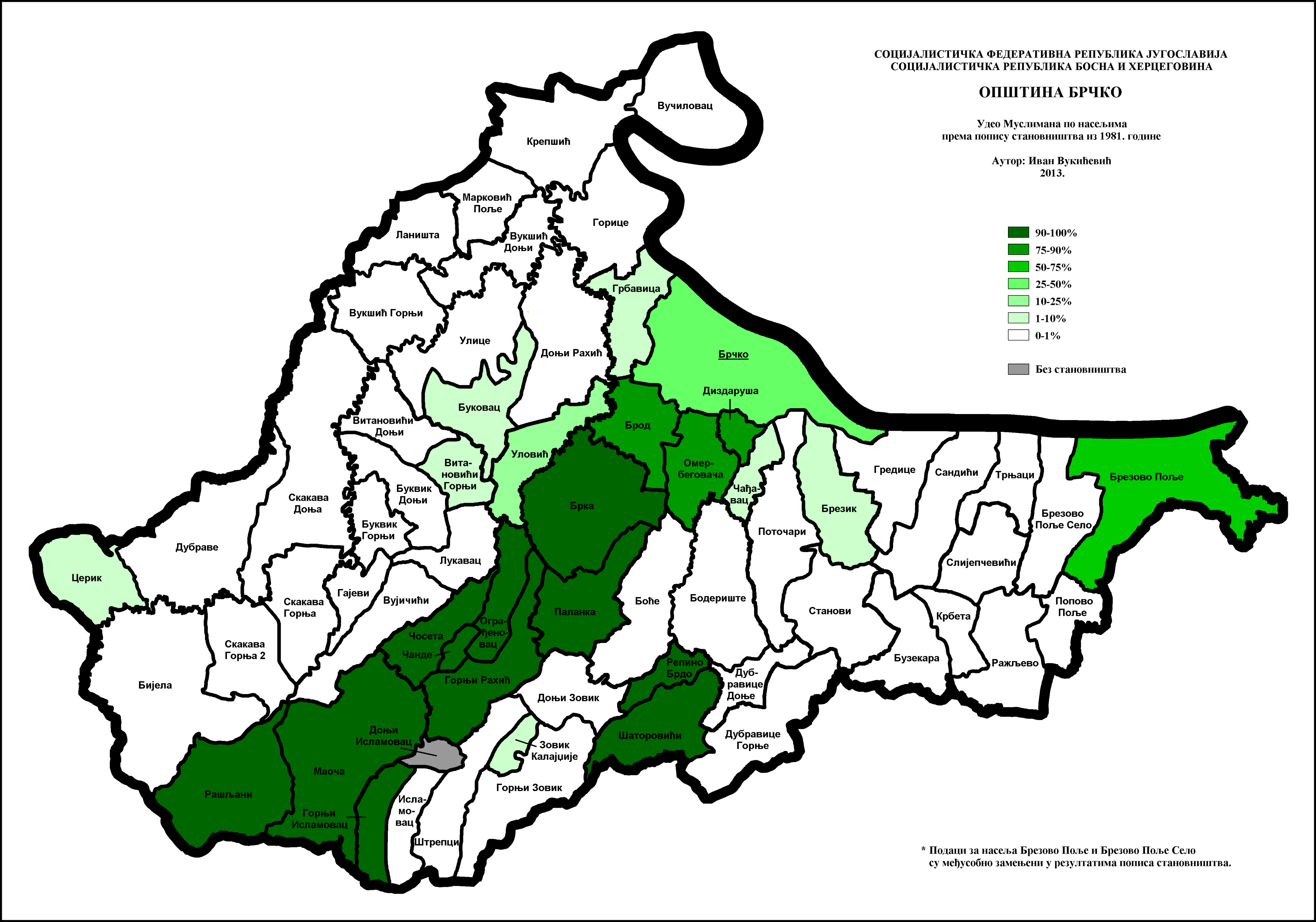
Share of Bosniaks in Brčko by settlements 1981

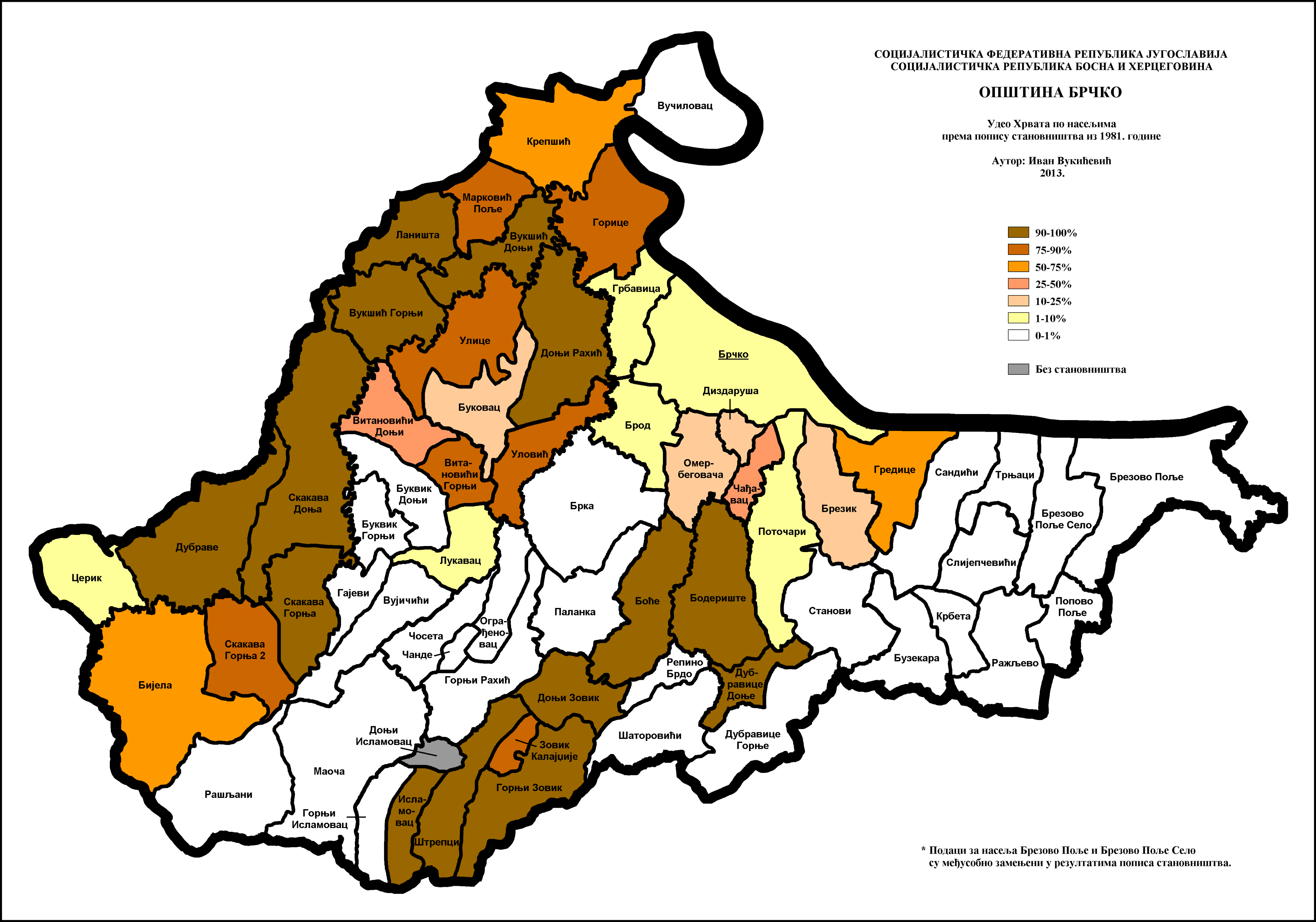
Share of Croats in Brčko by settlements 1981

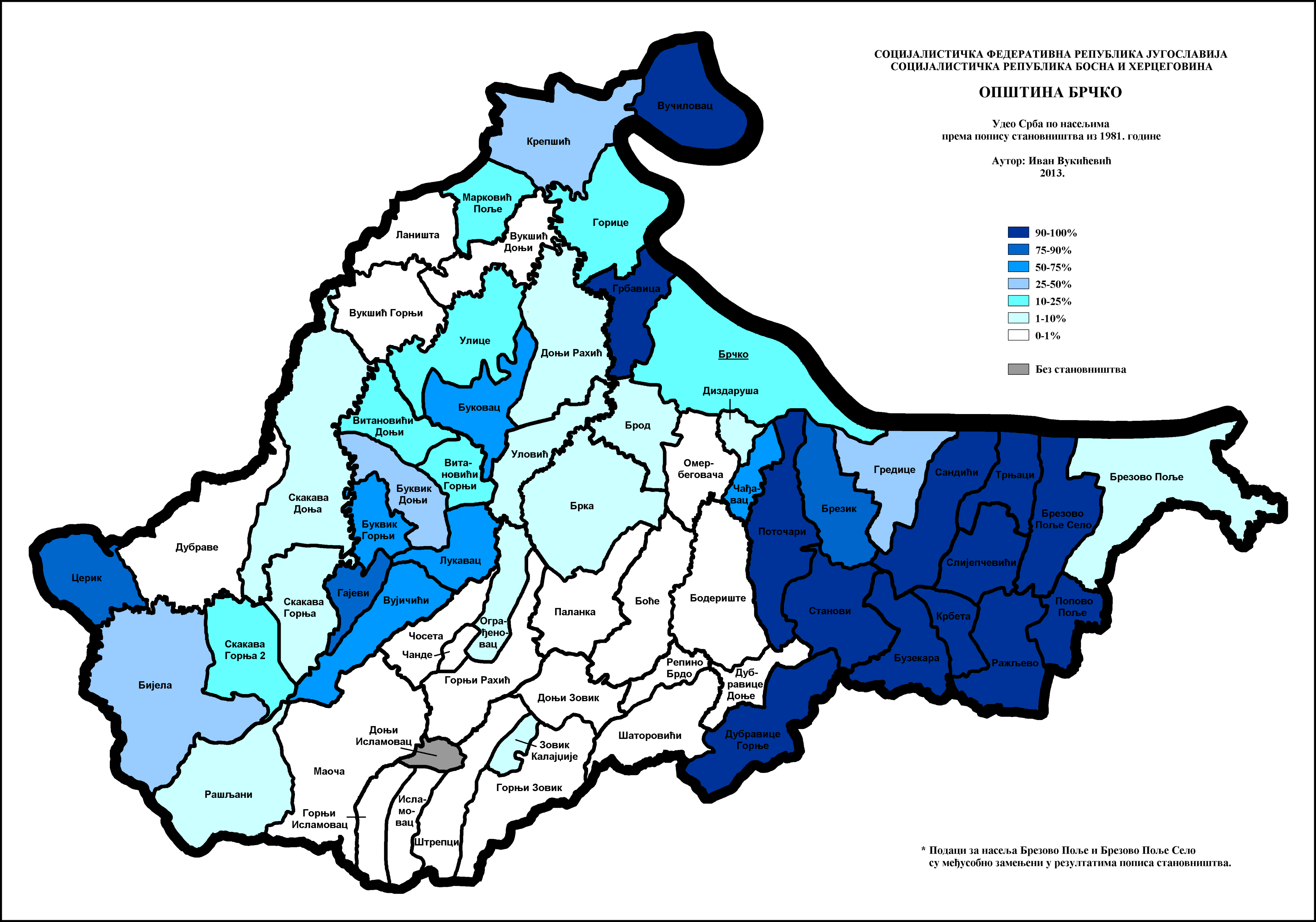
Share of Serbs in Brčko by settlements 1981

1991 census

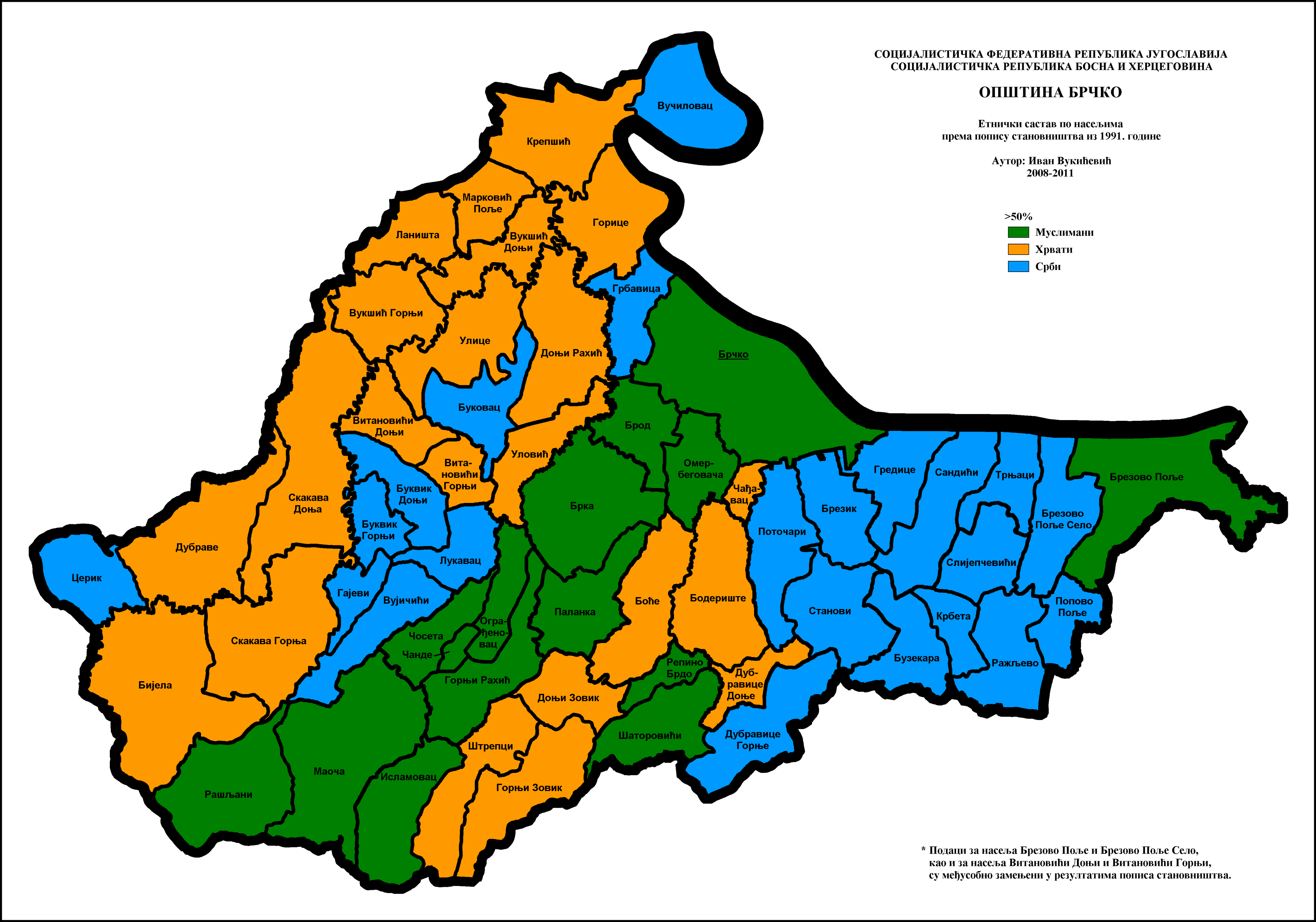
Ethnic structure of Brčko by settlements 1991

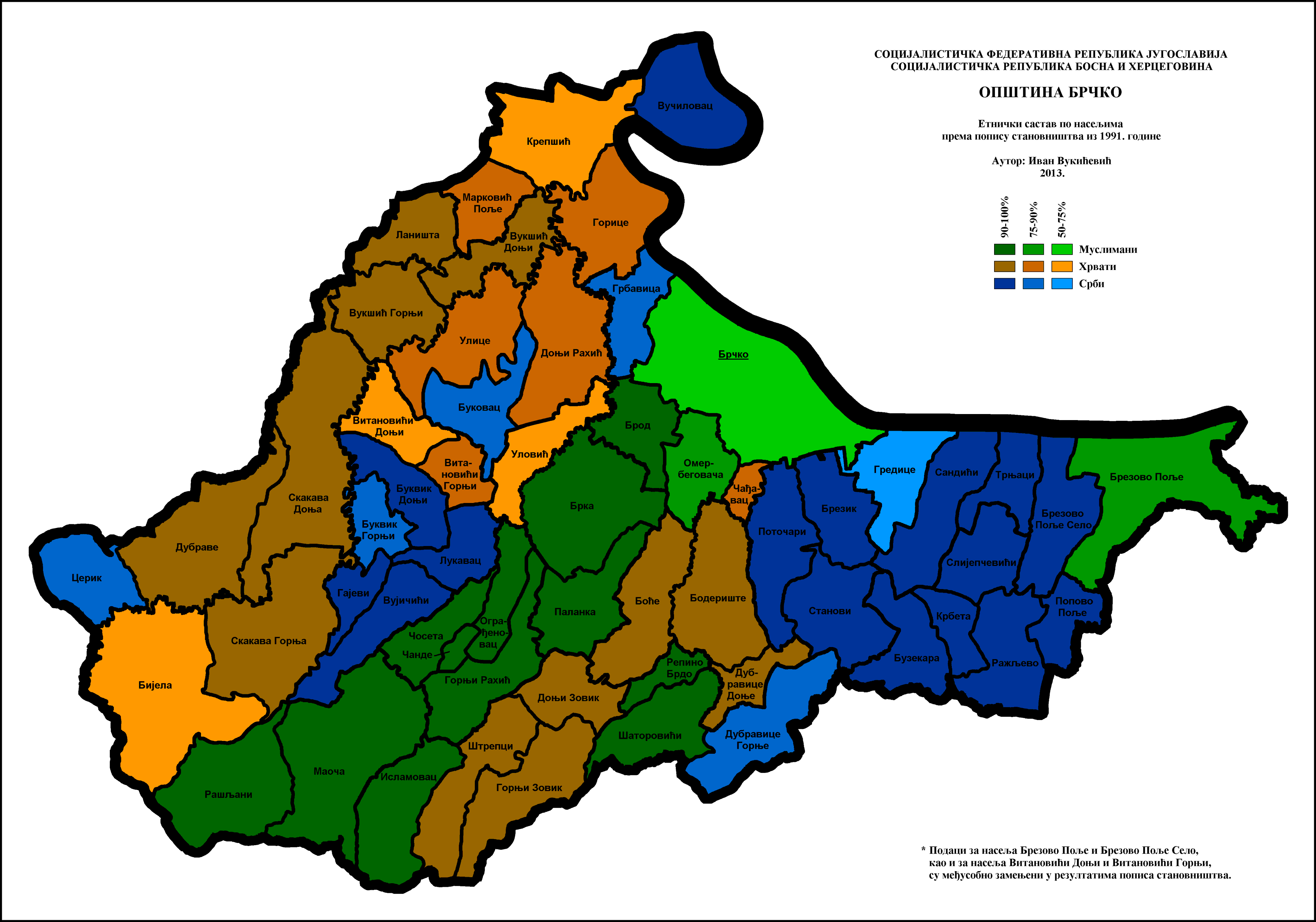
Ethnic structure of Brčko by settlements 1991

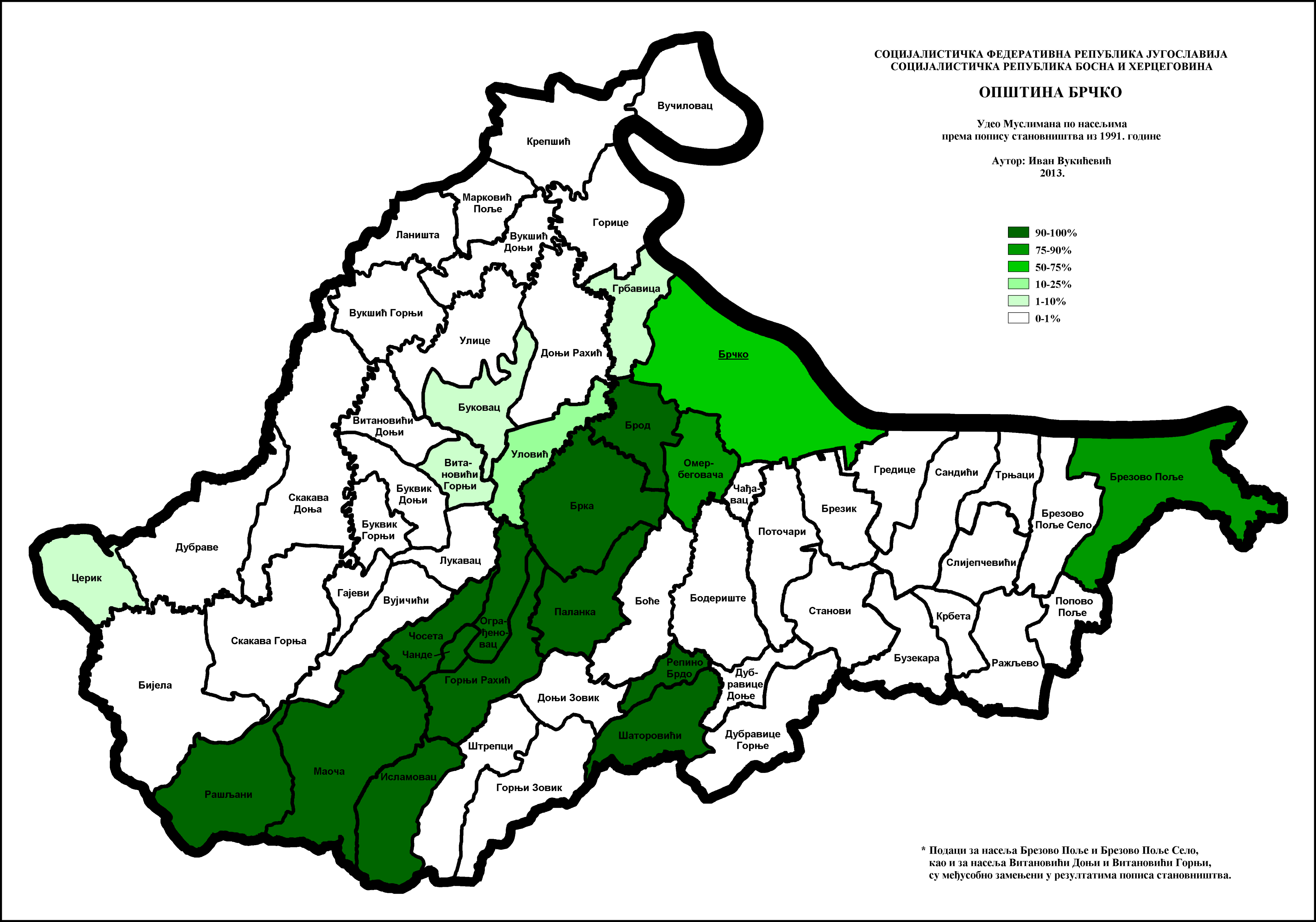
Share of Bosniaks in Brčko by settlements 1991

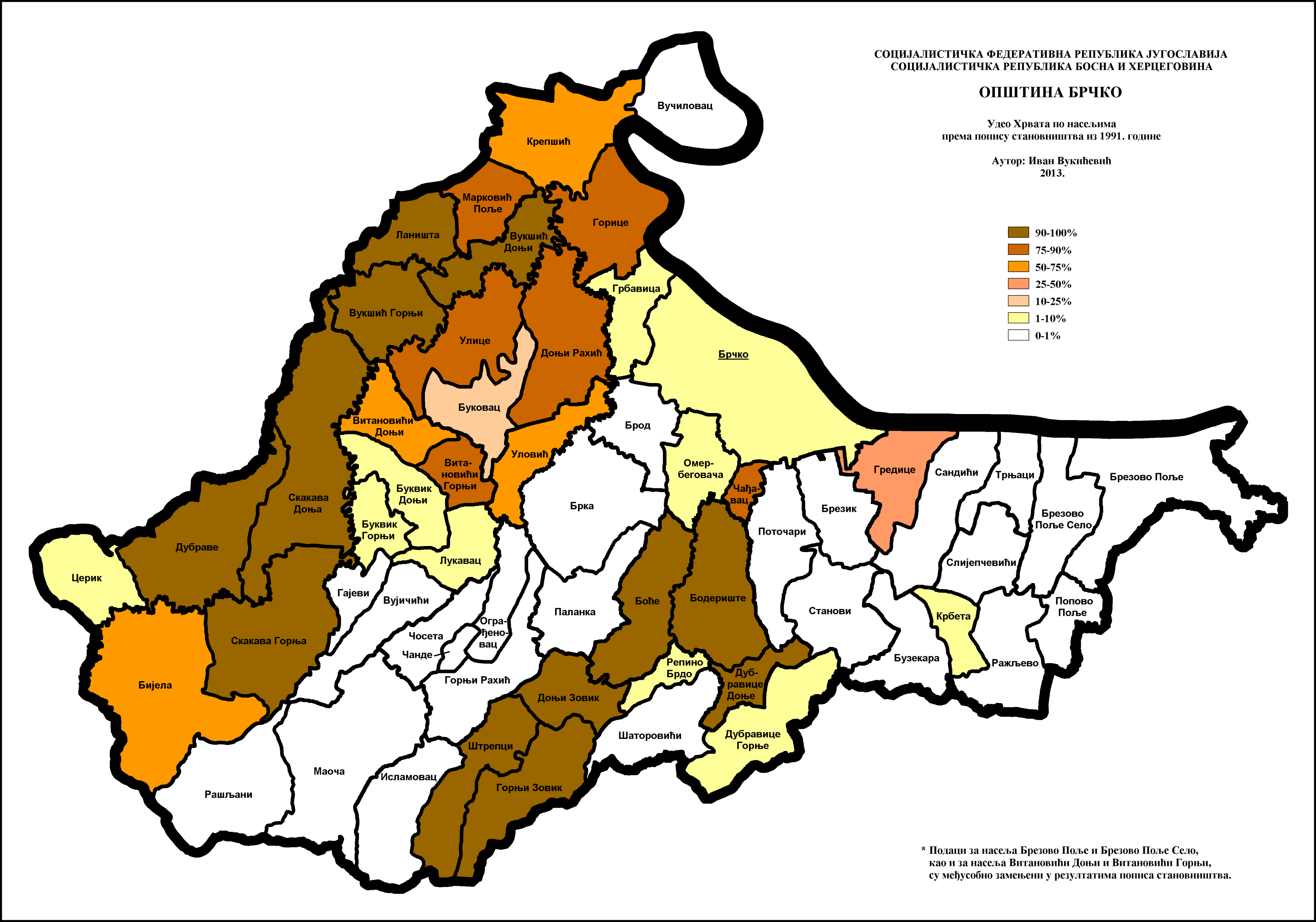
Share of Croats in Brčko by settlements 1991

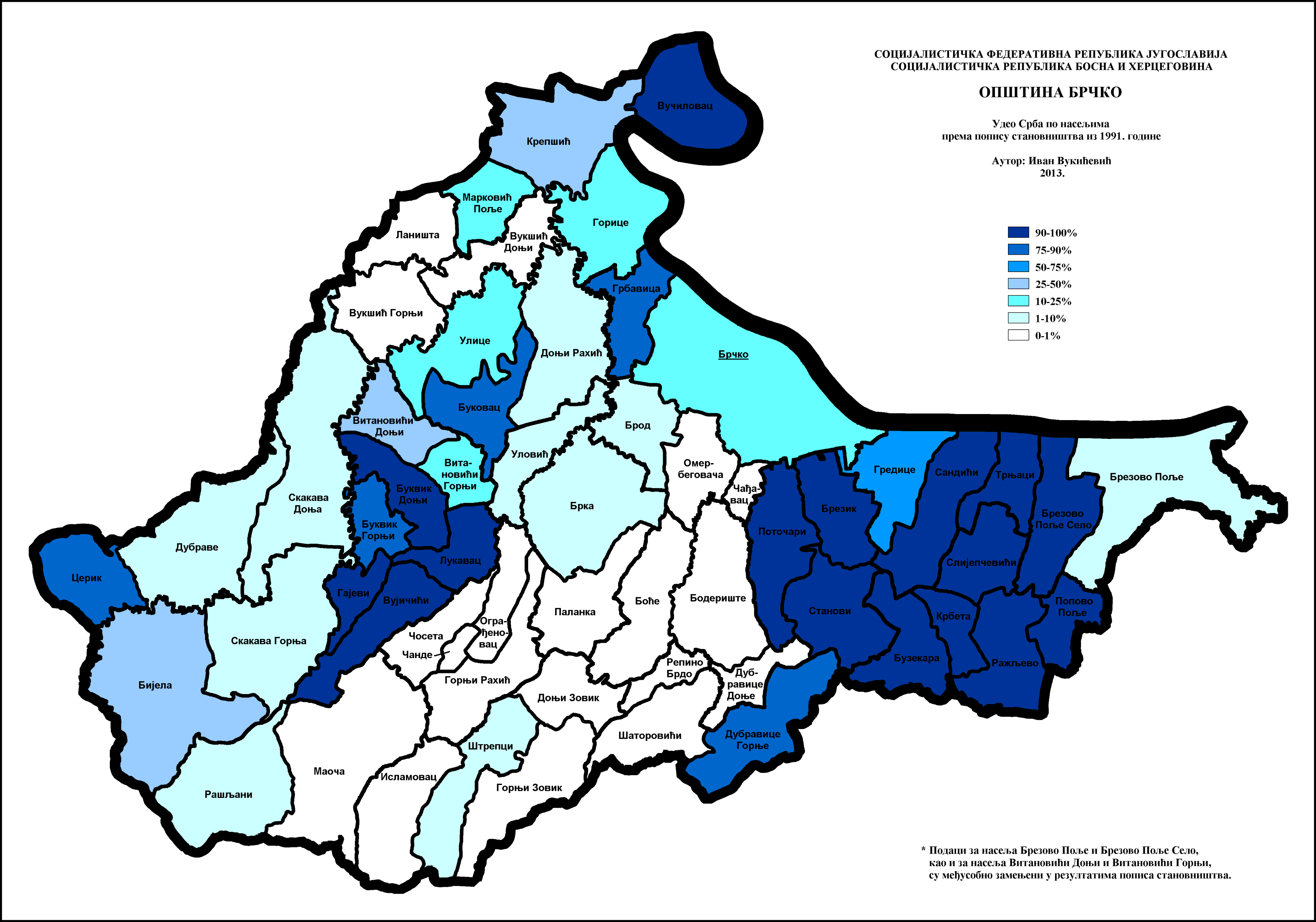
Share of Serbs in Brčko by settlements 1991

2013 census

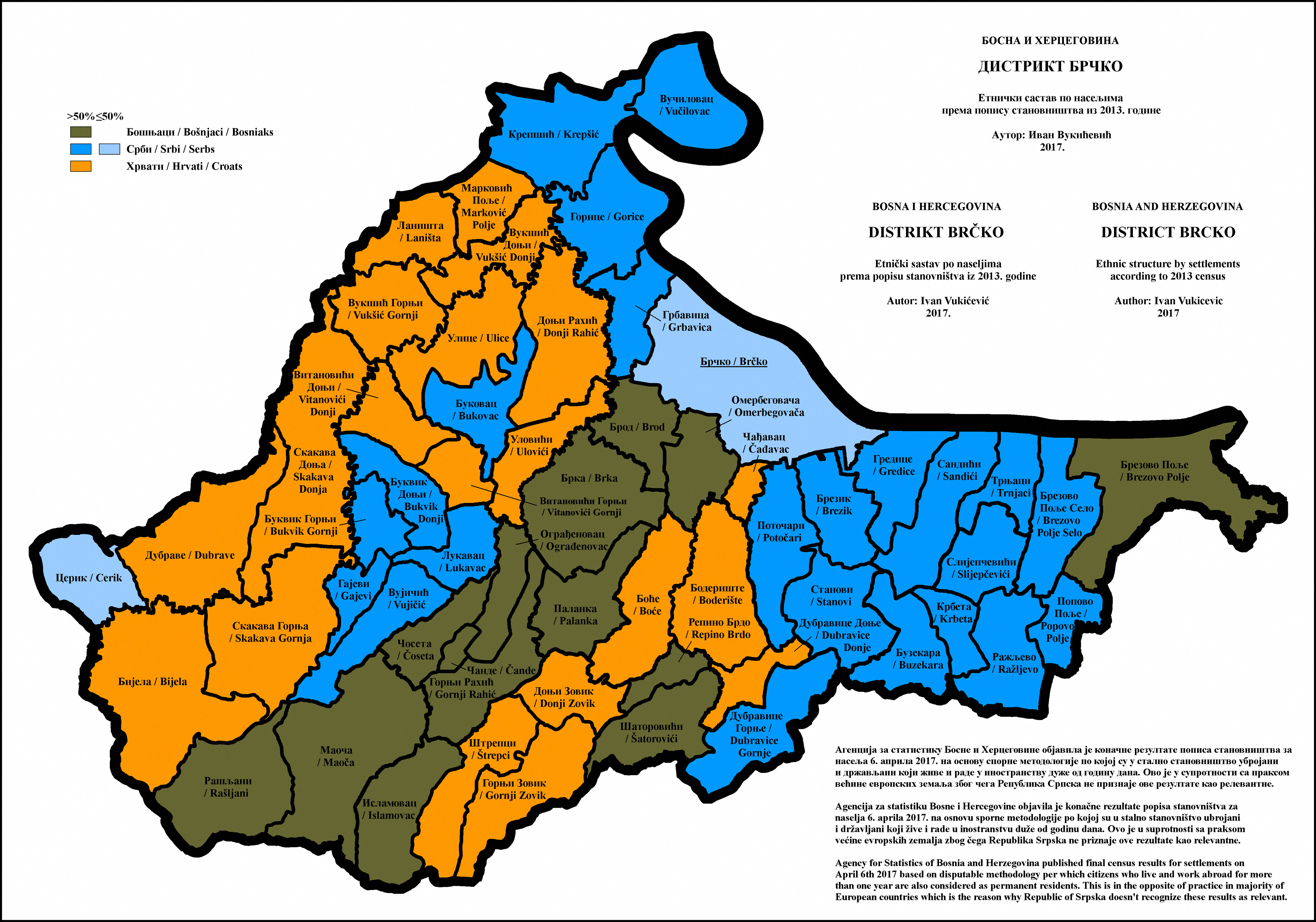
Ethnic structure of Brčko by settlements 2013

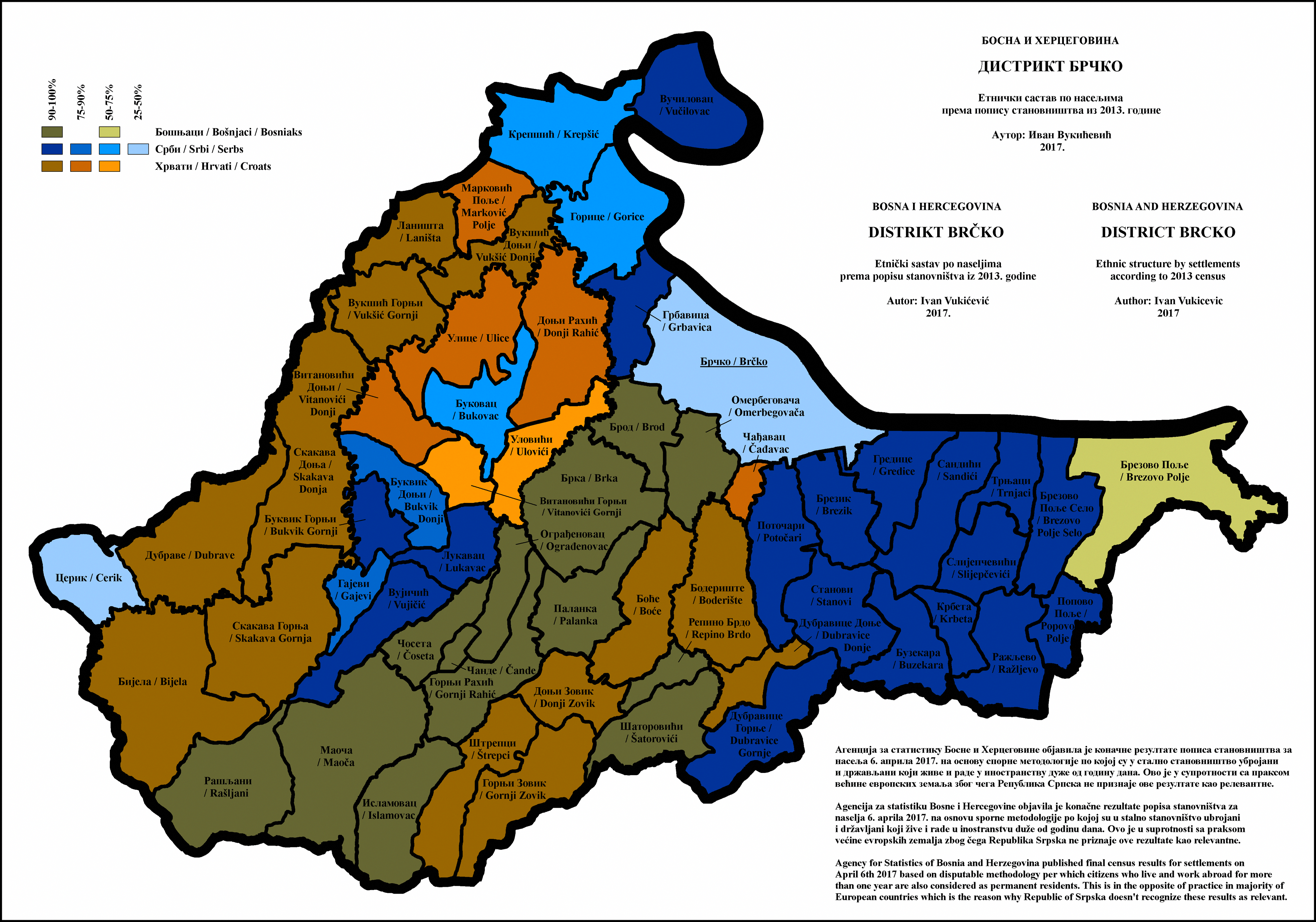
Ethnic structure of Brčko by settlements 2013

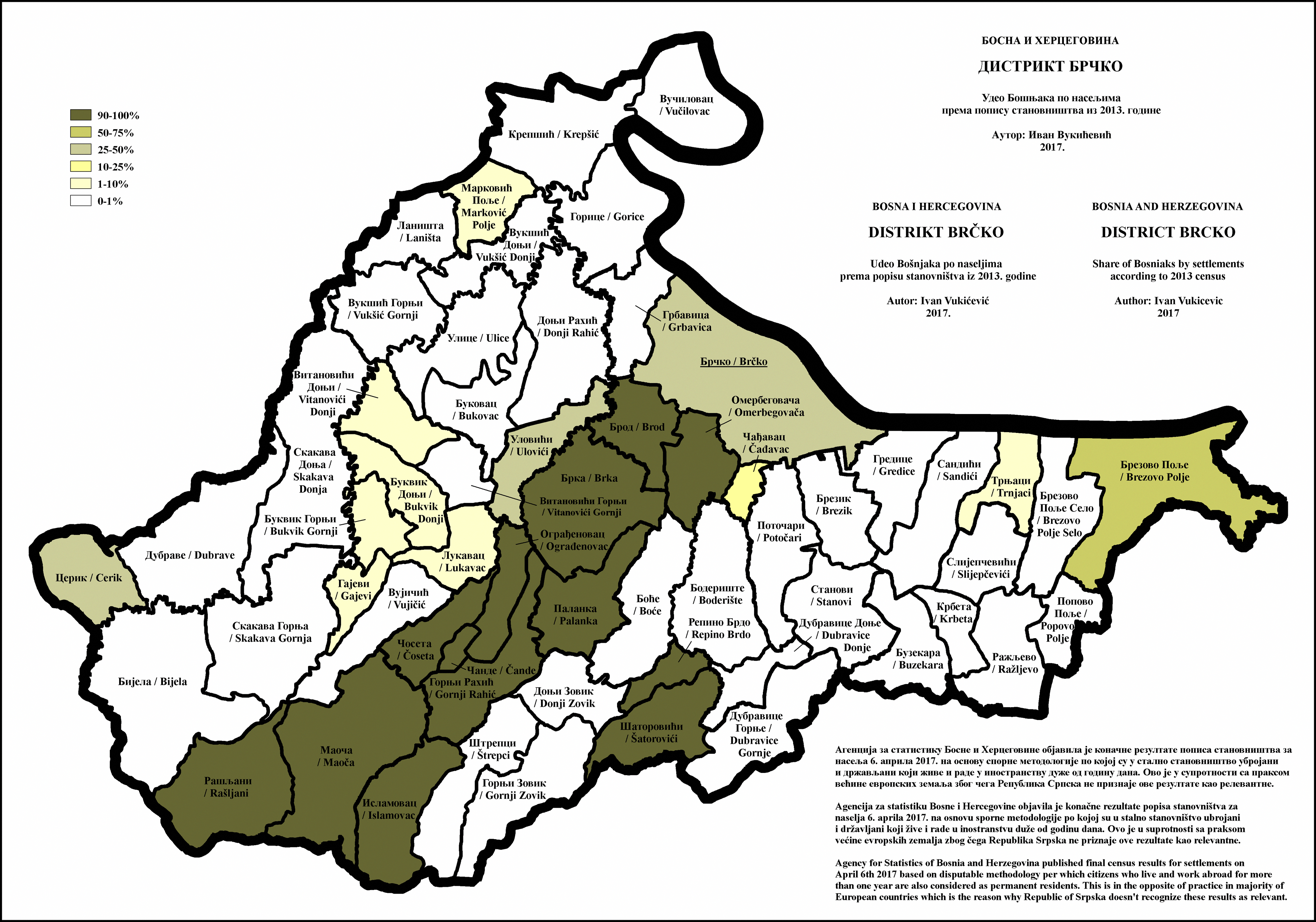
Share of Bosniaks in Brčko by settlements 2013

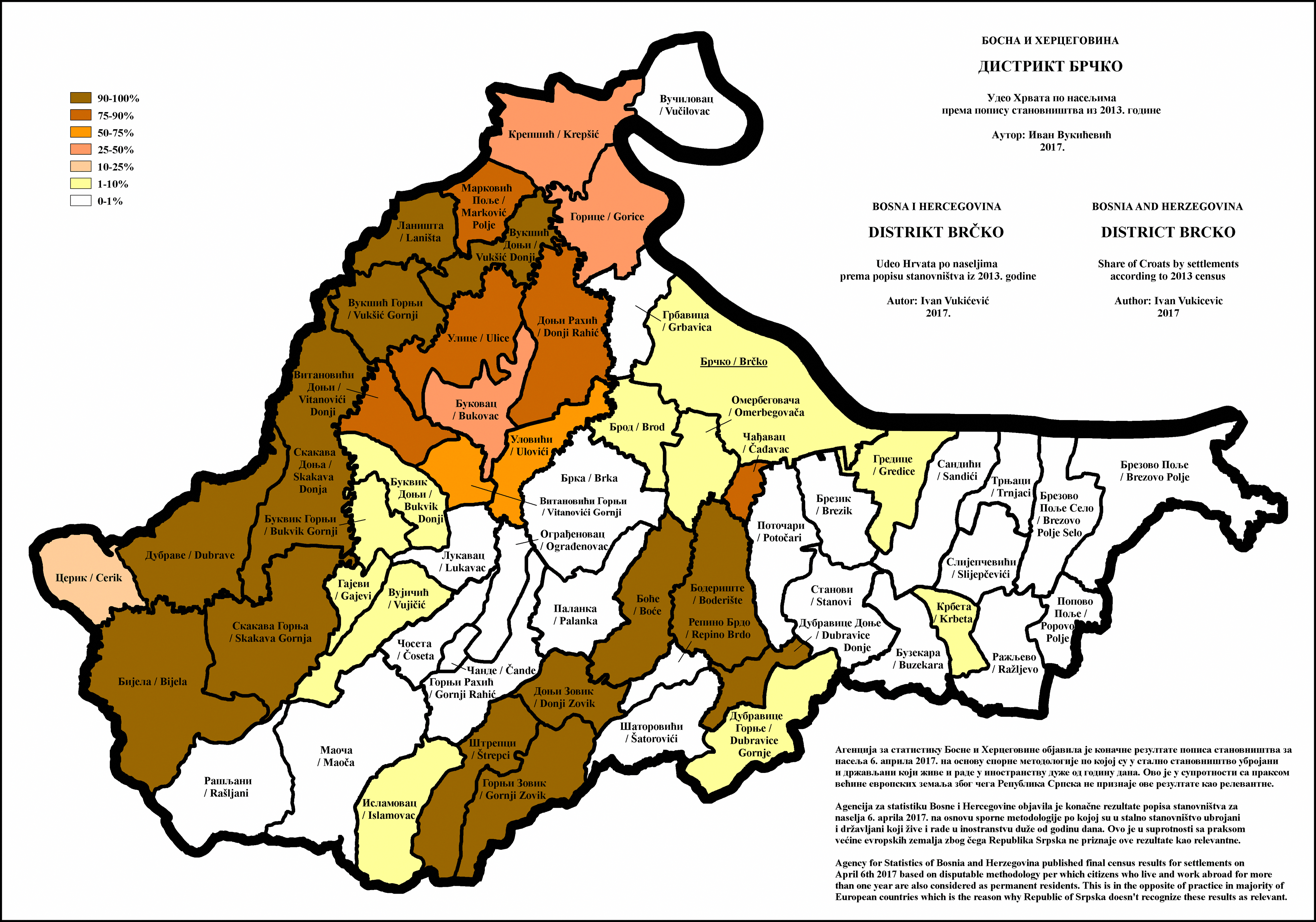
Share of Croats in Brčko by settlements 2013

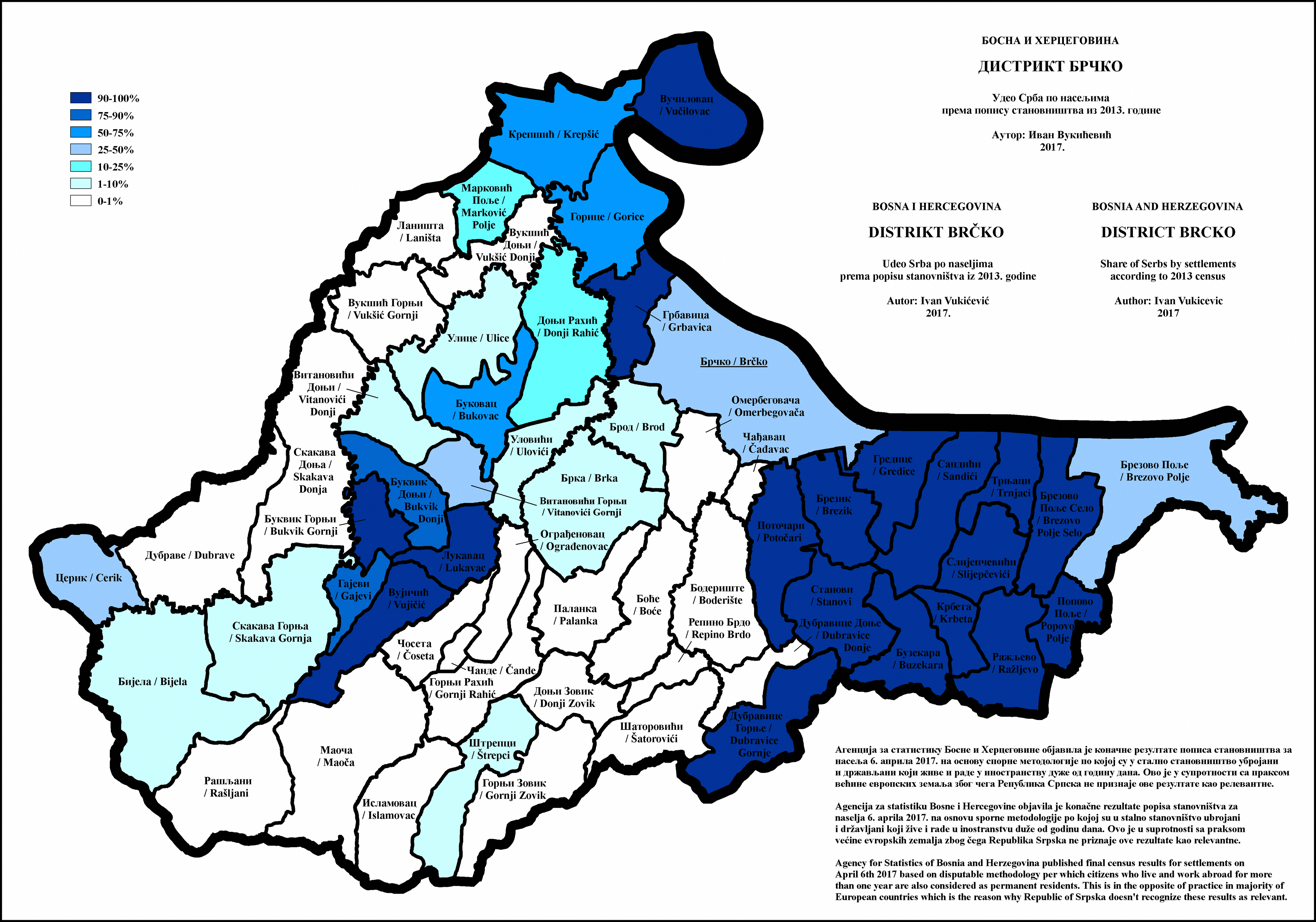
Share of Serbs in Brčko by settlements 2013

== Politics ==
=== Assembly of Brčko District ===
There are 31 seats in the Assembly of the Brčko District. The seats are divided as follows as of 2024:

Constituency	Council				Mayor elected by Council		
Constituency	Party	Popular vote	%	Seats	Mayor	Votes	%
Brčko	Party of Democratic Action	6,024	15.93	4	Siniša Milić, SNSD	24	82.76
Brčko	SNSD—SPS	5,945	15.72	4			
Brčko	SP—DNS—PUP	3,489	9.23	3			
Brčko	United Srpska	3,431	9.07	3			
Brčko	Croatian Democratic Union	3,387	8.96	3			
Brčko	Party of Democratic Progress	2,321	6.14	2			
Brčko	Union for a Better Future	2,271	6.01	2			
Brčko	People and Justice	2,224	5.88	2			
Brčko	Our Party	2,053	5.43	2			
Brčko	Social Democratic Party	1,988	5.26	1			
Brčko	Serb Democratic Party	1,752	4.63	1			
Brčko	Party for Bosnia and Herzegovina	1,385	3.66	1			
Brčko	HSS SR—HDZ 1990	1,201	3.18	1			
Brčko	Minority candidate Alija Denjagić	(276)	—	1			
Brčko	Minority candidate Radoslav Subotić	(157)	—	1			
Total		38,589		31			

== Notable people ==
- Edo Maajka (born Edin Osmić), rapper
- Edvin Kanka Ćudić, human rights activist
- Esed Kadrić, Mayor of Brčko
- Lepa Brena (born Fahreta Jahić), pop-folk singer
- Mladen Petrić, Croatian international football player
- NiKo, Counter-Strike: Global Offensive player
- Vesna Pisarović, pop singer

== See also ==
- Brčko bridge massacre
- List of mayors of Brčko
