= Kosovo independence precedent =

Precedent set by the international recognition of the independence of Kosovo

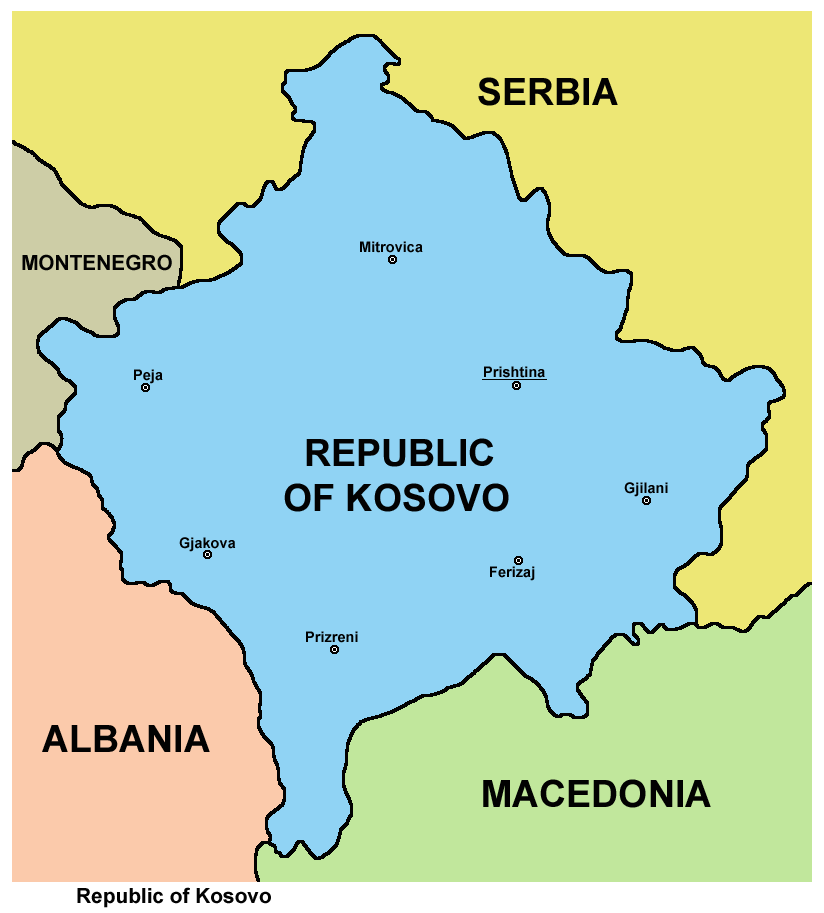
Map of the Republic of Kosovo

On 17 February 2008, the majority of members of the Assembly of Kosovo, including Hashim Thaçi, and Fatmir Sejdiu (who were not members of the Assembly), not acting in the capacity of PISG, declared Kosovo an independent and sovereign state. Kosovo was soon recognized as a sovereign state by the United States, Turkey, Albania, Austria, Germany, Italy, France, the United Kingdom, the Republic of China (Taiwan), and others. This triggered an international debate over whether Kosovo's unilateral declaration of independence had set a precedent in international law that could apply to other separatist movements, or whether it is a special case. Kosovo has been recognized as an independent state by dozens of UN member states, with estimates varying widely from around 84 to over 110, depending on the source and how derecognitions are counted.

It is estimated that a total of 70 unrecognized nations and organizations have used the Kosovo precedent to achieve their goals. Abkhazia and South Ossetia renewed their calls for the recognition of their sovereignty. Kosovo's independence also led to increased tensions in Bosnia and Herzegovina, where the Republika Srpska vetoed recognising Kosovo, and threatened to declare independence themselves. However, international legal scholars widely treat Kosovo as a unique (sui generis) case rather than creating a general legal precedent for secession.

The precedent was cited over the course of the Russo-Ukrainian War. Russian President Vladimir Putin refused to recognize Kosovo independence, but subsequently used the precedent to achieve goals in Ukraine. The Republic of Crimea proclaimed its independence from Ukraine on 11 March 2014, citing the Kosovo precedent; Crimea was annexed by the Russian Federation just a week later. In 2022, recognition of eastern Ukraine's breakaway regions and their later annexation is supported by the Kosovo precedent.

== Arguments ==
=== Kosovo does not establish a precedent ===
Some leaders argue that the Kosovo situation is unique and does not establish a precedent.

In a statement issued 19 February 2008 the U.S. State Department argued every territorial conflict is unique. It said Kosovo's unilateral independence cannot be used by other states to resolve disputes. When asked about the Kosovo's independence in reference to recognition of South Ossetia, Secretary of State Condoleezza Rice dismissed it and said, "we've been very clear that Kosovo is sui generis and that that is because of the special circumstances out of which the breakup of Yugoslavia came. The special circumstances of the aggression of the Milosevic forces against Kosovars, particularly Albanian Kosovars, and it’s a special circumstance." Rice additionally referred to UN sanctions on the then-Federal Republic of Yugoslavia and the presence of UNMIK as reasons for Kosovo being a special case.

Secretary-General of the United Nations Ban Ki-moon in an interview for Interfax news agency said "Each situation needs to be examined based on its unique circumstances," and said Kosovo was a "highly distinctive situation" because of the intervention of the international community. At the same time he emphasised that recognition is left up to UN member states and is not decided by the Secretariat or the Secretary-General.

Since 2010 (ICJ Advisory Opinion), international legal scholarship has largely converged on this view: (1) Kosovo did not establish a general legal right to secession. (2)The ICJ ruled that Kosovo’s declaration did not violate international law, but at the same time it did not create a legal precedent.

=== Kosovo establishes a useful precedent ===
Some argue that Kosovo establishes a precedent for other geographical regions that wish to secede.

- Daniel Turp, a member of the pro-Quebec sovereignty Parti Québécois who sits in the National Assembly of Quebec, said "Recognition [of Kosovo] sets the stage for Ottawa to eventually recognize an independent Quebec"
- László Tőkés, an ethnic Hungarian from Romania who is a member of the European Parliament for Hungary, said Kosovo is a "model for the Romanian region of Transylvania".

=== Kosovo establishes a dangerous precedent ===
A number of political leaders have voiced their belief that the independence of Kosovo will create a dangerous precedent for other separatist movements.

- Russian President Vladimir Putin described the declaration of independence by Kosovo as a "terrible precedent that will come back to hit the West in the face". Russian Defence Minister Sergei Ivanov and Russian diplomat Konstantin Kosachev said that granting Kosovo independence would open Pandora's box.
- Argentine Foreign Minister Jorge Taiana: "Recognizing Kosovo's independence ... would set a dangerous precedent against the national claim to recover sovereignty over the Malvinas islands."
- The Sri Lankan foreign ministry said Kosovo "could set an unmanageable precedent in the conduct of international relations, the established global order of sovereign states and could thus pose a grave threat to international peace and security."
- Czech Republic President Václav Klaus: "For me Kosovo is, above all, a precedent. We’ve opened a Pandora’s Box in Europe that could have disastrous consequences."
- The Indian Ambassador to Serbia Ajay Swarup: Kosovo "can set a very dangerous precedent for similar cases around the world".
- President Kassym-Jomart Tokayev of Kazakhstan: "If the right to self-determination is put into practice all over the world, then there would be chaos."
- President Amadou Toumani Touré of Mali: "International norms must be respected because their abuse and the violation of territorial integrity could threaten a series of countries with a similar problem."
- Romanian President Traian Băsescu stated that "the problem that started with Kosovo must be stopped", otherwise it would result in "big problems of territorial integrity" in the Balkans, the Black Sea region and other parts of Europe.
- Slovak Prime Minister Robert Fico: Kosovo may become a dangerous precedent to be followed by separatists in other regions.
- Tajikistan Foreign Minister Asomudin Saidov: "This precedent may result in other peoples also demanding territorial independence."
- Ukrainian Foreign Minister Volodymyr Ohryzko: "On the territory of the former USSR, particularly in Moldova, Georgia and Azerbaijan, there are so-called 'frozen conflicts' and undoubtedly, separate forces can use what's happening today in Kosovo in its favor in whatever way."
- Vietnam's Ambassador to the United Nations Le Luong Minh: "By creating a dangerous precedent, this development has negative implications for international peace and stability,"

To minimize a serious influence of Kosovo Precedent to the solution of other conflicts, the OSCE Parliamentary Assembly held in Kyiv in July 2007 issued a warning that "solution of certain conflicts should not be used as a model for the solution of other conflicts".

=== Position of the Russian Federation ===
Russian President Vladimir Putin stated in 2008:

"Our position is extremely clear. Any resolution on Kosovo should be approved by both sides. It is also clear that any resolution on Kosovo will definitely set a precedent in international practice."

Analysts have taken this as meaning the Russian Federation would come out for the independence of de facto independent breakaway regions in the former Soviet Union.

Sergei Mironov, the chairman of Russia's upper house of parliament stated in December 2007, "In case of the unilateral recognition of the independence of Kosovo, Russia will be entitled to change its approach to the so-called unrecognised republics in the post-soviet regions - South Ossetia, Abkhazia and Transnistria". He went on to state "In case of such a recognition of Kosovo, Russia will be able to say that it is free in its approach, including towards the so-called unrecognised republics of Abkhazia, South Ossetia, the Nagorno-Karabakh Republic and Transnistria".

Immediately following Kosovo's declaration of independence the Russian officials appeared to soften their position, with Boris Gryzlov stating only that Moscow should "reshape its relations with self-proclaimed republics" which according to news reports could mean lifting the economic embargo on the regions.

On 13 March 2008, following a hearing on the unrecognised republics, the Russian Duma Committee for CIS recommended an upgrading of relations with Abkhazia, Transnistria, the Nagorno-Karabakh Republic and South Ossetia - including the possibility of recognition. Other recommendations included or reported include:

- the establishment of diplomatic missions in the regions, with the foreign ministry to decide whether they are consulates or another type of mission
- a removal of import duties on goods created by businesses with Russian shareholders in the regions
- increased humanitarian and economic assistance for Russian passport-holders in the regions

Alexei Ostrovsky, chairman of the lower house's committee on former Soviet affairs said at the parliamentary hearing, "The world community should understand that from now on the resolution of conflicts in the ex-Soviet area cannot be seen in any other context from that of Kosovo." Participation of the breakaway republics in international organisations and forums was also mentioned in a press release before the hearings. The Nezavisimaya Gazeta daily described the hearing as "the launch of a procedure of recognition". The committee recommendations were set to go to a vote a week after the hearing. Russian Deputy Foreign Minister Grigory Karasin said the ministry would "look carefully at all the recommendations" but that Russian policy remained unchanged.

Russian Foreign Minister Sergey Lavrov stated in 2008: "A precedent is objectively created not just for South Ossetia and Abkhazia but also for an estimated 200 territories around the world. If someone is allowed to do something, many others will expect similar treatment." Chairman of Foreign Affairs Committee Mikhail Margelov said the precedent set by Kosovo "will inspire separatists not only in Europe, but in the Middle East as well."

== Alleged influence of events ==
=== Russo-Ukrainian War ===
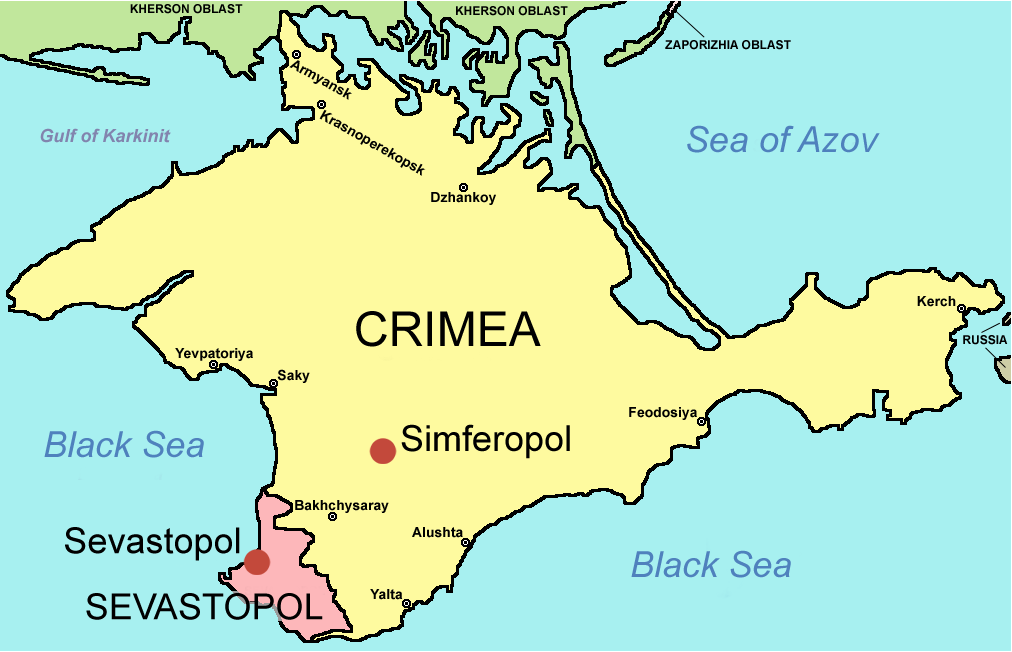
Map of Crimea, including the Sevastopol region which was included in the independence declaration on 11 March 2014.

In 2014, Russia recognized Crimean independence, but not that of Kosovo. Later, in February 2022 Vladimir Putin, President of Russia has cited Kosovo precedent as justification for Russian recognition of the Donetsk People's Republic and the Luhansk People's Republic.

Chris Borgen, Professor of Law and co-director of the Center for International and Comparative Law at St. John's University School of Law in New York City, disagreed with Kremlin's evocation of Kosovo. He stated that Kosovo was under international administration for over a decade, and was the place of ethnic crimes in a bloody conflict; conversely, no such events engulfed Crimea before 2014. Furthermore, Kosovo remained independent, whereas Crimea was annexed by Russia, indicating that the real motivation of the latter was Russian irredentism.

In October 2017, Czech president Miloš Zeman called the international community's recognition of Kosovo independence and protest over Crimean annexation as 'double standards'.

=== Abkhazia and South Ossetia ===
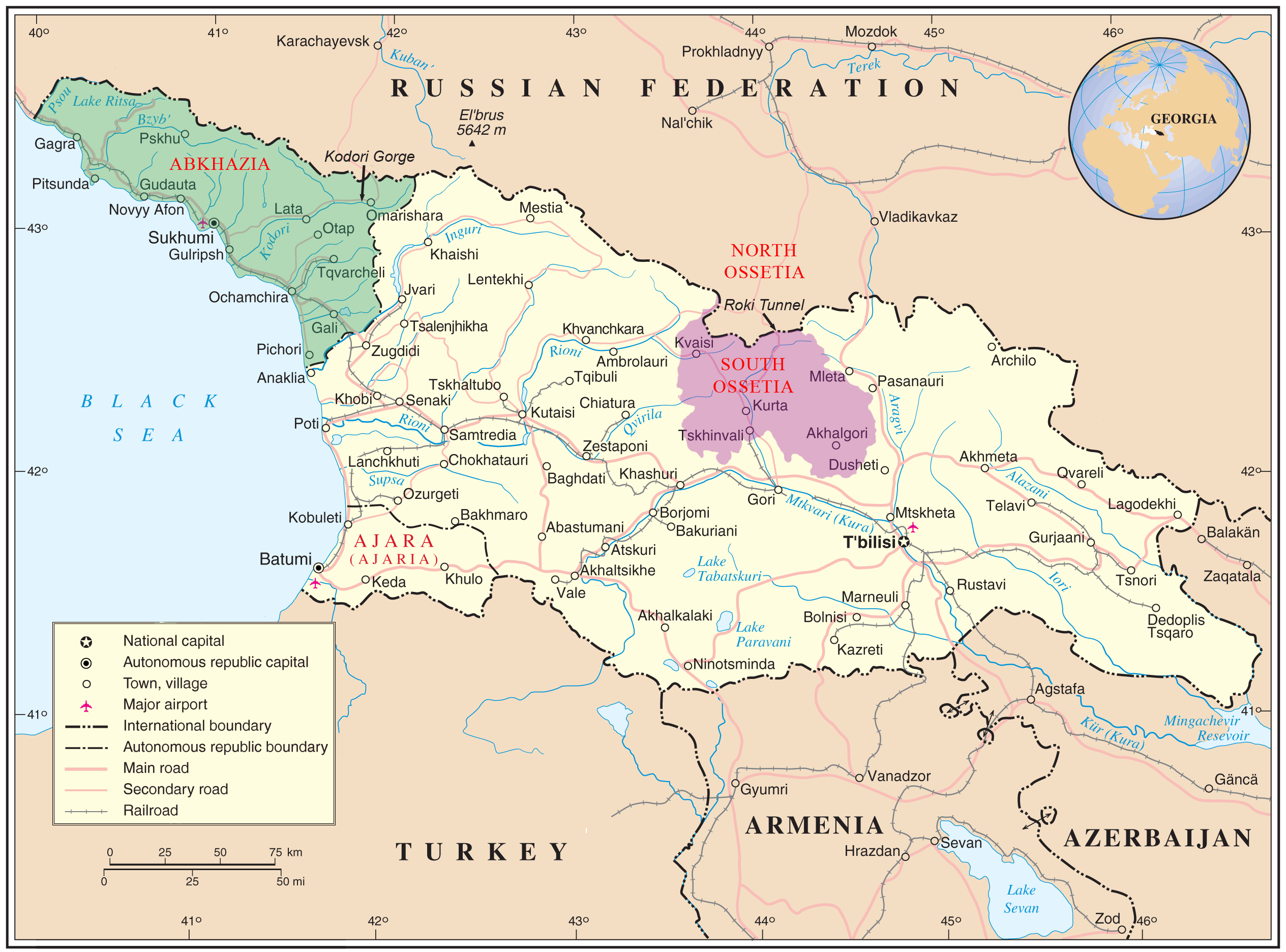
Map of Georgia showing the autonomous republics of Abkhazia (de facto independent) and Adjaria, and the de facto independent region of South Ossetia.

EU High Representative for Common Foreign and Security Policy Javier Solana has expressed concern that Kosovo's campaign for independence could set a precedent for Georgia's breakaway regions of South Ossetia and Abkhazia. On 6 March 2008 Russia's Foreign Ministry announced it had lifted sanctions on Abkhazia and called on other CIS member states to do the same. Russia denied the event had any connection to Kosovo, but Georgian parliament speaker Nino Burjanadze said she believed the move was part of Russia's response to Kosovo's declaration and signals an attempt to "annex" Abkhazia.

South Ossetia, Abkhazia, and Transnistria have all submitted formal requests for recognition of their independence to Russia, among other countries, and international organisations citing Kosovo as a precedent.

Abkhazia's Sergei Bagapsh and South Ossetia's Eduard Kokoity said in a statement addressed to the United Nations: "If Kosovo is separated from Serbia and its independence is recognised, one more powerful proof will emerge that ethnic conflicts can be solved on principles other than a respect for territorial integrity ... Abkhazia and South Ossetia have just as strong grounds to demand independence as Kosovo." Separately, Sergey Bagapsh said "The fate of Kosovo has been ordained, thus our fate will also be determined in the nearest future."

In October 2009, Russian President Dmitry Medvedev said that parallels between Kosovo and South Ossetia are inappropriate. Medvedev said that in case of South Ossetia it was about "repelling a military aggression" and condemned the unilateral actions and recognition of Kosovo. In April 2009, Russian Deputy Foreign Minister Alexander Grushko said that Russia would not recognize Kosovo even if the European Union recognized Abkhazia and South Ossetia.

=== Armenia, Azerbaijan, Artsakh ===
The final borders of the conflict after the 1994 ceasefire was signed.

Armenia's Deputy Parliament Speaker Vahan Hovhannisyan has said Kosovo's independence will influence the settlement of the dispute over Artsakh Republic. Foreign Minister Vardan Oskanyan declared at the UN General Assembly session in October 2007 that the Armenian side “does not understand and cannot accept the reverse logic that Kosovo was given independence and that another nation cannot obtain self-determination." Before being elected president, Armenian prime-minister Serzh Sargsyan said Kosovo was not a precedent for Karabakh. He underlined that Nagorno-Karabakh has been independent for the past 17 years. However, former President of Armenia Robert Kocharyan said "The Kosovo precedent is too important for Armenia. Certainly, this will have a positive influence for recognition of independence of Nagorno Karabakh Republic".

An Azerbaijan Foreign Ministry spokesman has said of Kosovo: "We view this illegal act as being in contradiction with international law." Following a skirmish between Armenian military forces in Nagorno-Karabakh and Azerbaijan forces which left 4 Azeri and 12 Armenian soldiers dead, Azerbaijan said it was sparked by international recognition of Kosovo. US State Department Spokesman Tom Casey rejected the comparison stating "'[Kosovo's] status was managed under a specific U.N. Security Council resolution, with an understanding in that resolution that final status was something that was going to be decided by the international community at an appropriate time," Casey said, adding "Kosovo is not a precedent and should [not] be seen as a precedent for any other place out there in the world. It certainly isn't a precedent for Nagorno-Karabakh."

=== Moldova and Transnistria ===
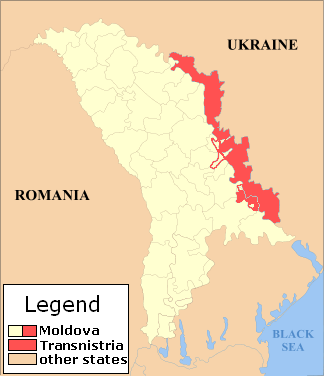
Map of Transnistria

The then president of the unrecognised state of Transnistria Igor Smirnov said that "the Russian leadership, in recognising the independence of Abkhazia and South Ossetia, has underlined the priority of the expression of the wills of the people for solving such problems".

On 27 August, the day after Russia's recognition, Dmitry Medvedev met with President of Moldova Vladimir Voronin, where the Russian leader made clear that Moscow is ready to make the maximal efforts to solve the Transnistria conflict in the framework of the sovereignty of the Republic of Moldova. Relations between Moldova and Transnistria worsened after Moldova refused to support the independence of Abkhazia and South Ossetia, which Chișinău categorically rejected, considering that "as in the case of the recognition of Kosovo, this step only decreases amenability of the sides in the search for a compromise".

=== Republika Srpska ===
Location of Republika Srpska (yellow) in Bosnia and Herzegovina.

According to a poll of Bosnian Serbs taken by the Brussels-based Gallup Balkan Monitor in November 2010, 87 percent would support a referendum being called on Republika Srpska's independence from Bosnia and Herzegovina.

Since Kosovo's declaration of independence Bosnian Serb nationalists have called for Dodik to fulfill his promises and call a referendum. Dodik has since said he will only call a referendum if Srpska's autonomy is threatened. Despite this Bosnian Serb lawmakers passed a resolution on February 21, 2008, calling for a referendum on independence if a majority of the UN members (98 out of 193), especially members of the European Union, recognise Kosovo's declaration of independence. After the resolution was passed the U.S. cut aid to the SNSD and the resolution was condemned by the European Union. The Peace Implementation Council (PIC) overseeing Bosnia and Herzegovina said the country's entities have no right to secede. The High Representative for Bosnia and Herzegovina, Miroslav Lajcak said Srpska has "absolutely no right" to secede and that he would use his Bonn Powers "if there are threats to peace and stability" or the Dayton peace agreement.

In an interview, Dodik said if most countries recognise Kosovo's self-proclaimed independence, this would legitimise the right to secession and added "we do not see a single reason why we should not be granted the right to self-determination, the right envisaged in international conventions."

=== Montenegro ===
Members of the majority in the municipal assembly of Pljevlja in Montenegro announced a secession from Montenegro following the Montenegrin recognition of Kosovo.

=== Northern Cyprus ===
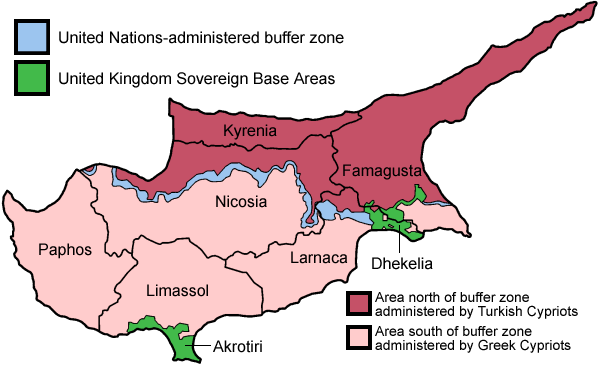
The northern part areas are administered by Turkish Cypriots.

Özdil Nami, a senior Turkish Cypriot official, told the Turkish Daily News, "When diplomatic efforts are exhausted other alternatives are put on the table. We clearly see this in Kosovo where diplomacy proved futile and other formulas are floating around. This will certainly have an impact on Cyprus." Nami suggests the resolution of Kosovo may be applied to North Cyprus well. According to Nami, "Everyone sees 2008 as the last window of opportunity for a solution to the Cyprus problem." He claims Cyprus is being warned that "other alternatives could be on the agenda" if there is no resolution. Turkish Cypriot leader Mehmet Ali Talat has rejected this connection saying "We do not see a direct link between the situation in Kosovo and the Cyprus Problem. These problems have come up through different conditions."

=== Slovakia ===
In Slovakia the Kosovo precedent is seen as a potential threat to its territorial integrity because of the worsened relations with the ethnic Hungarians that live on the south of the country.

=== Israel ===
On 20 February 2008, days following Kosovo's declaration of independence, it was widely interpreted in Israel, from Yasser Abed Rabos comments, that Palestine may follow suit with a declaration of its own. Israel has criticized states that have recognized Palestine but refuse to recognize Kosovo, and stated that Israel will not recognize Kosovo until all European states do so. However, in September 2020, Israel did recognize Kosovo.

== North Kosovo ==
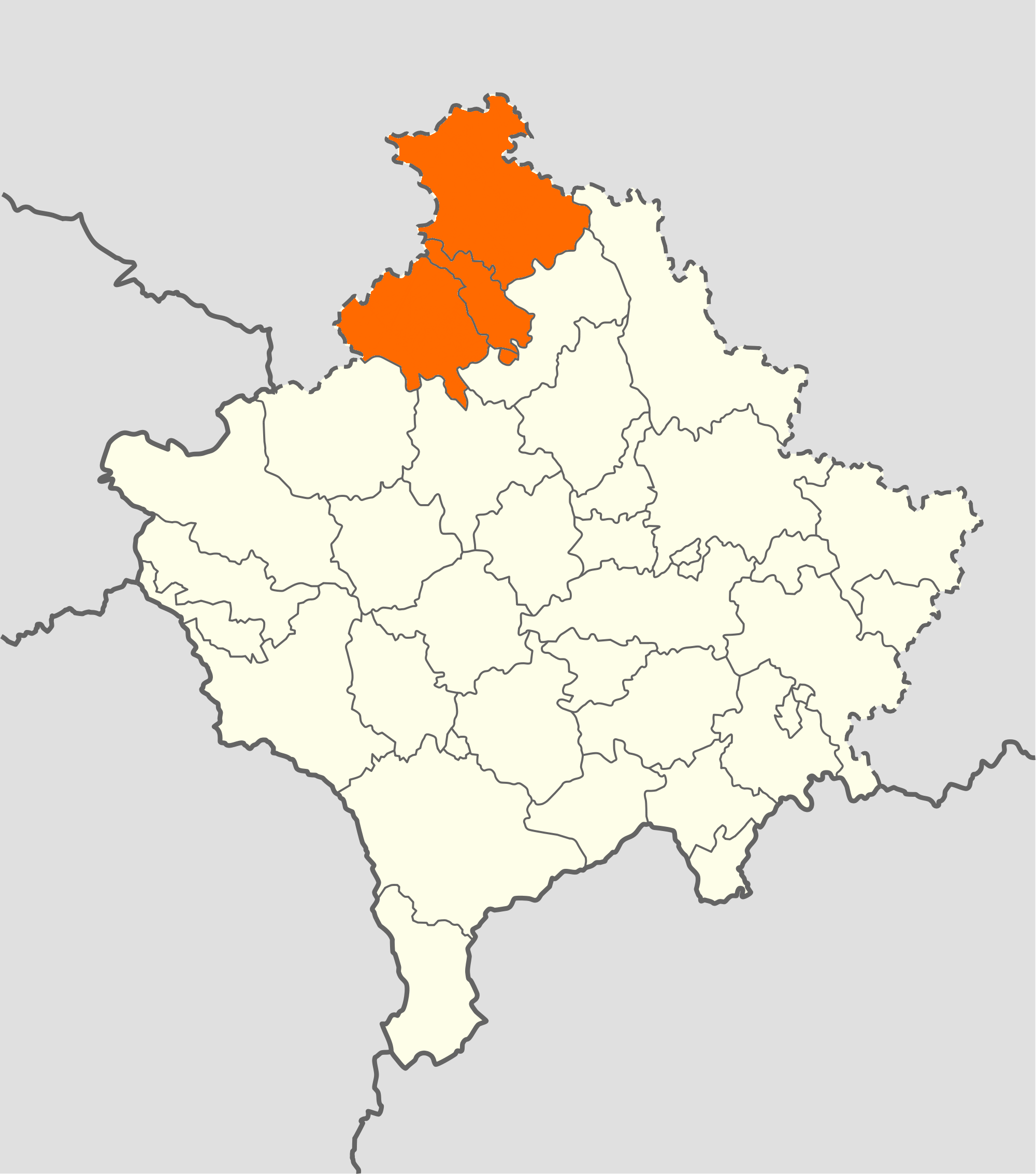
Map highlighting North Kosovo municipalities.

Since the independence declaration, the Serb-inhabited North Kosovo maintained a high degree of autonomy throughout the North Kosovo Crisis, with local municipalities and the Assembly of the Community of Municipalities largely operating autonomously, outside control of Pristina. A referendum held in 2012 in the four-Serb dominated municipalities saw 99.74% of the participating voters reject Kosovo's institutions. The 2013 Brussels Agreement provided for the formation of a Community of Serb Municipalities (Zajednica srpskih opština, ZSO), which remains in the process of implementation due to ongoing political disagreements between governments of Kosovo and Serbia.

== See also ==
- Colour revolution
- Controversy over Abkhazian and South Ossetian independence
- Detachment (territory)
- Greater Albania
- Independence referendum
- International Court of Justice, Advisory Opinion on Kosovo precedent
- Irredentism
- Kosovo status process
- Namibia exception
- Nationalism
- Right to exist
- Yugoslav Wars
