= Christian Schmidt =

German politician (born 1957)

His Excellency Christian Schmidt
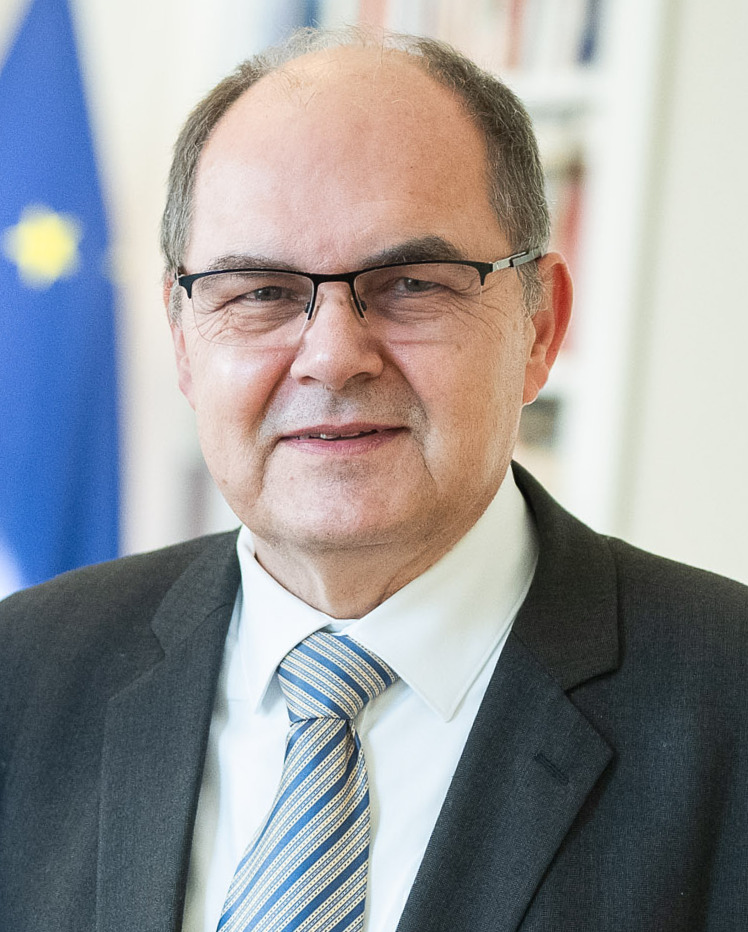
- Schmidt in 2024

High Representative for Bosnia and Herzegovina
- In office 1 August 2021 – 1 July 2026
- Preceded by: Valentin Inzko
- Succeeded by: Louis Crishock (acting)

Acting Minister of Transport and Digital Infrastructure
- In office 24 October 2017 – 14 March 2018
- Chancellor: Angela Merkel
- Preceded by: Alexander Dobrindt
- Succeeded by: Andreas Scheuer

Minister of Food and Agriculture
- In office 17 February 2014 – 14 March 2018
- Chancellor: Angela Merkel
- Preceded by: Hans-Peter Friedrich
- Succeeded by: Julia Klöckner

Parliamentary State Secretary in the Ministry for Economic Cooperation and Development
- In office 17 December 2013 – 17 February 2014
- Minister: Gerd Müller
- Preceded by: Gudrun Kopp
- Succeeded by: Thomas Silberhorn

Parliamentary State Secretary in the Ministry of Defence
- In office 23 November 2005 – 17 December 2013
- Minister: Franz Josef Jung; Karl-Theodor zu Guttenberg; Thomas de Maizière
- Preceded by: Walter Kolbow
- Succeeded by: Ralf Brauksiepe
Parliamentary offices
Member of the Bundestag; for Fürth
In office 20 December 1990 – 26 October 2021
Preceded by	Werner Dollinger
Succeeded by	Tobias Winkler

Personal details
- Born: 26 August 1957 (age 69) Obernzenn, West Germany
- Party: Christian Social Union
- Spouse: Ria Hess (m. 1989)
- Children: 2
- Education: University of Erlangen (LLB)
- Profession: Lawyer
- Website: christian-schmidt.de

Hans Сhristian Friedrich Schmidt (born 26 August 1957) is a German politician and member of the Christian Social Union (CSU) who served as the High Representative for Bosnia and Herzegovina from 2021 to 2026.

Schmidt served as Minister of Food and Agriculture from 2014 to 2018. He was Parliamentary Secretary of State in the German Federal Ministry of Defence from 2005 to 2013, as well as Parliamentary Secretary of State in the German Federal Ministry for Economic Cooperation and Development from December 2013 until February 2014. He was member of the Bundestag for Fürth from 1990 until his appointment as the High Representative for Bosnia and Herzegovina in 2021.

Schmidt's appointment as High Representative for Bosnia and Herzegovina was challenged by Russia, China, and the political leadership of Republika Srpska, who disputed his legitimacy. As High Representative, he used his powers to change electoral and constitutional rules, leading to both support and criticism.

== Early life and education ==
Schmidt attended the Georg-Willhem-Steller-Gymnasium in Bad Windsheim where he completed his Abitur in 1976. He then undertook mandatory military service in the 1st Mountain Division of the West German Army. He began legal studies in 1977 in Erlangen and Lausanne. Schmidt finished his legal studies with the successful completion of the required state examinations in 1982 and 1985. He was admitted to the bar in 1985 and practiced law until the assumption of his duties as Parliamentary State Secretary in November 2005.

== Political career ==
As a student Schmidt joined the Junge Union (JU), the CSU youth group, in 1973. In 1976 he registered as a member of the CSU. From 1980 to 1982 he was chairman of the JU-District Association in Neustadt-an-der-Aisch. In 1982 he was named Chair of the JU-Regional Association for Central Franconia, a position that he held until 1991. From 1984 to 1990 Christian Schmidt was a town councillor in his hometown of Obernzenn and member of the District Council for Neustadt an der Aisch-Bad Windsheim.

From 1989 to 1993 Schmidt was also a member of the CSU State Committee, a post that he took up again in 1999. Since 1999, in addition to his duties on the CSU State Committee, Schmidt has been Chairman of the CSU-District Association in Fuerth.

Schmidt is the Chair of the CSU Regional Working Group on Foreign, Security and European Policy. Since May 2010 he has also served as Chair of the Regional Evangelical Working Group of the CSU. In May 2011 he was named Chair of the Federal Evangelical Working Group of the CSU/CDU.

=== Member of Parliament (1990–2021) ===
Schmidt was elected to the German Parliament, the Bundestag, in the 1990 elections. From 1991 to 2002 he was Chair of the national level CSU Working Group for Foreign, Defence and European policy. He then went on to serve as Chair of the CDU/CSU Parliamentary Defence Working Group. In this capacity he also served as the CDU/CSU spokesman for defence policy.

Schmidt served as Chair of the German-Israeli Parliamentary Friendship Group from 1994 until 1998 and as Chair for the German-British Parliamentary Friendship Group from 1998 until 2005. He has also been a member of the German-Baltic, German-Croatian, and German-Czech Parliamentary Friendship Groups. He was his parliamentary group's rapporteur on the German-Polish “Good Neighbour” Treaty in 1991, as well as the 1992 German-Czechoslovakia Treaty. In 1997 the Federal Minister of Defence selected Schmidt to serve on the Advisory Committee of the German-Czech Discussion Forum.

He was rapporteur for the discussions pertaining to the Parliamentary Participation Act of 2005 dealing with the deployment of the German Bundeswehr within the Federal Republic.

Schmidt entered the German Parliament as a directly elected candidate, representing Fürth. In the 2009 elections he won 43.3% of the First Votes. In December 2012 he was nominated for the seventh time as the CSU candidate for the upcoming Federal Parliamentary Elections in 2013. The CSU Assembly of Delegates awarded him 98.7% of the vote (155 of 157 votes).

==== Parliamentary State Secretary (2005–2013) ====
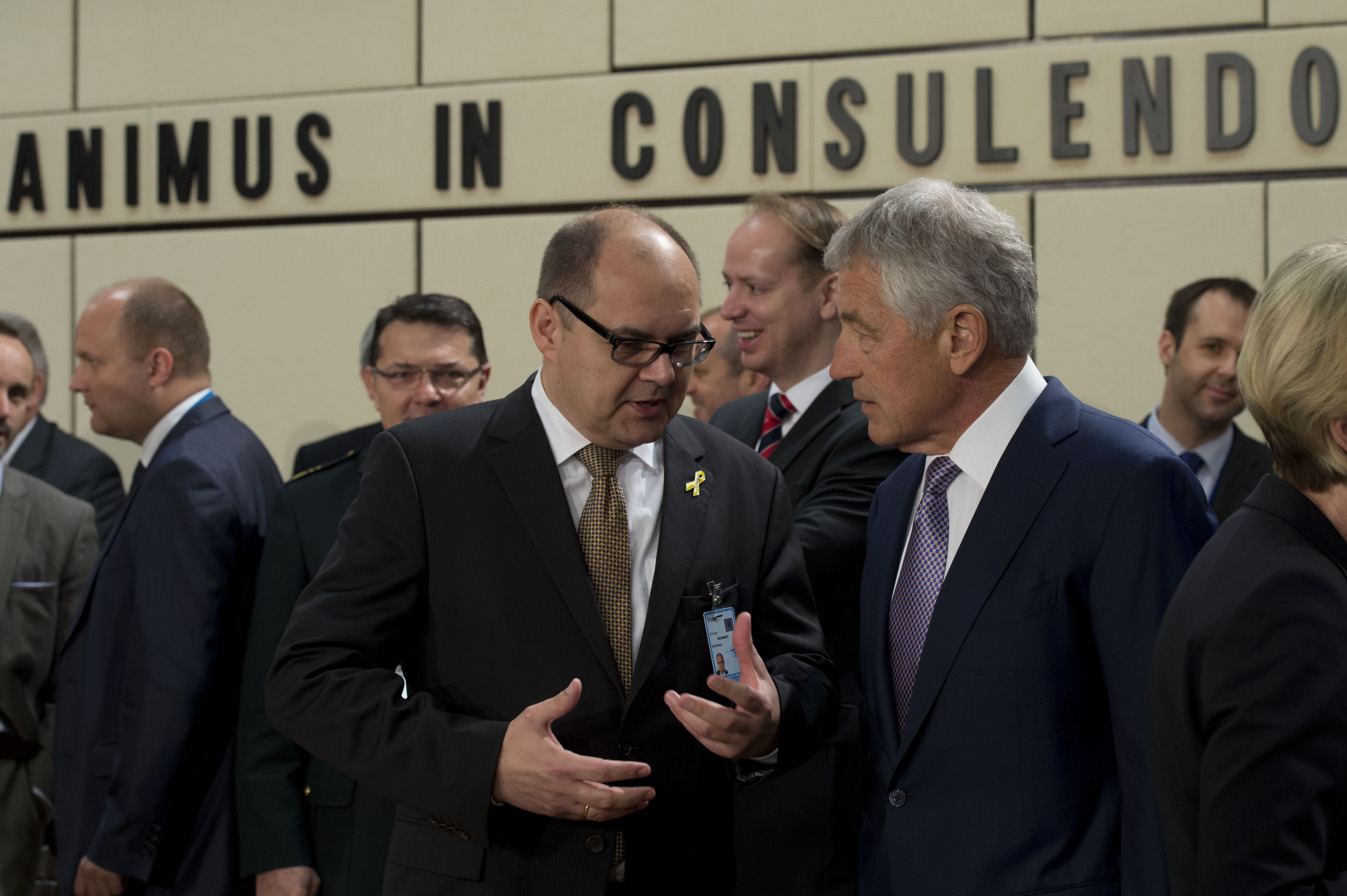
Schmidt alongside U.S. Secretary of Defense Chuck Hagel, 5 June 2013

Schmidt was named Parliamentary State Secretary in the Federal Ministry of Defence by Chancellor Angela Merkel on 23 November 2005. In this capacity he served as parliamentary and political representative for three Ministers of the Defence; Franz Josef Jung, Karl-Theodor zu Guttenberg and Thomas de Maizière.

During his time in office Schmidt advanced the establishment of a foundation to care for service members negatively impacted by the side effects of radar signals encountered during their service. His time in office has seen several landmark events including the investigation into the wartime activities of World War II German flying ace Werner Mölders (2007), the reorientation of the Federal Republic's armed forces (since 2010) and the resignation of Defence Minister zu Guttenberg in the wake of a plagiarism scandal (2011). Schmidt had defended zu Guttenberg against the accusations of plagiary. Schmidt also played an instrumental role in the establishment and financing of the “Hardship Fund” (Härtefall-Stiftung). This fund, maintained by the Soldiers’ Relief Association e.V., was founded in 2012 with the express remit of supporting soldiers seriously injured in the line of duty. The fund provides support above and beyond the standard duty of care laws in the Federal Republic, thereby serving as additional assistance for those veterans most in need.

Following the resignation of zu Guttenberg in 2011 Schmidt remained in office and was re-confirmed to the post by the new Minister for Defense, Thomas de Maiziere. In the negotiations to form a coalition government following the 2013 federal elections, he was part of the CDU/CSU delegation in the working group on foreign affairs, defense policy and development cooperation, led by de Maizière and Frank-Walter Steinmeier.

From 2011 until 2017 Schmidt had been serving as one of 5 deputy chairmen of the CSU, under the leadership of chairman Horst Seehofer. In this capacity, he was his party's spokesman on foreign and security policy, as well as on European politics. He was also responsible for the relationship of the CSU with other parties that are members of the European People's Party caucus (Christian Democrats) at the European Union level. He managed CSU international outreach to Israel, Croatia, Austria, the United States of America and the United Kingdom of Great Britain and Northern Ireland.

==== Federal Minister of Food and Agriculture (2014–2018) ====
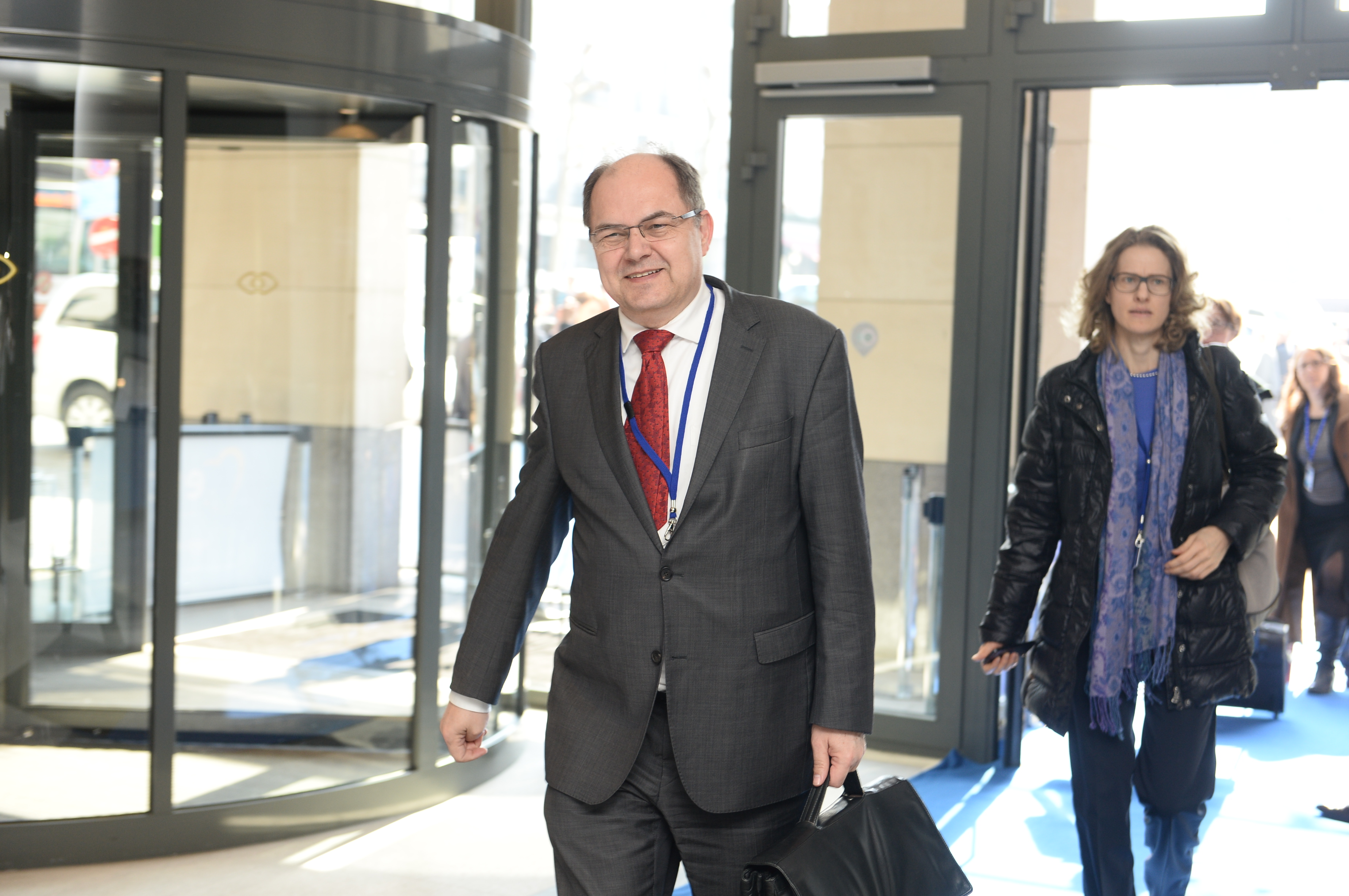
Schmidt arriving to an EPP summit in Brussels, 17 March 2016

From 2014 until 2018, Schmidt served as Federal Minister of Food and Agriculture in the third cabinet of Chancellor Angela Merkel.

In response to a 2016 collapse in milk prices, Schmidt rolled out an emergency package of at least €100 million for the country's dairy farmers, including loans and tax relief. Also during his time in office, Germany culled 776,000 farm chickens, turkeys, ducks and other types of poultry between November 2016 and January 2017 to combat bird flu.

In November 2017, Schmidt angered most politicians by breaking an agreement not to back a European Union proposal to extend the use of glyphosate for another five years, a measure opposed by Environment Minister Barbara Hendricks of the SPD, who had secured a guarantee of a non-positive vote just minutes before; it is usual practice that Germany abstains in EU votes if ministers from different governing parties disagree on a policy. Following the incident, Chancellor Merkel publicly scolded Schmidt, arguing that he should not have voted in favor against the wish of his colleague and in breach of government instructions. Schmidt's connections to the agricultural lobby have been part of criticism ever since.

=== Later career ===
After leaving his government post, Schmidt served on the Committee on Foreign Affairs and its Sub-Committee on the United Nations.

In 2019, Schmidt was appointed by the Federal Ministry of the Interior, Building and Community to serve on the committee that oversaw the preparations for the 30th anniversary of German reunification.

In June 2021, he announced that he would not stand in the 2021 federal elections, but instead resign from active politics by the end of the parliamentary term.

=== High Representative for Bosnia and Herzegovina (2021–2026) ===
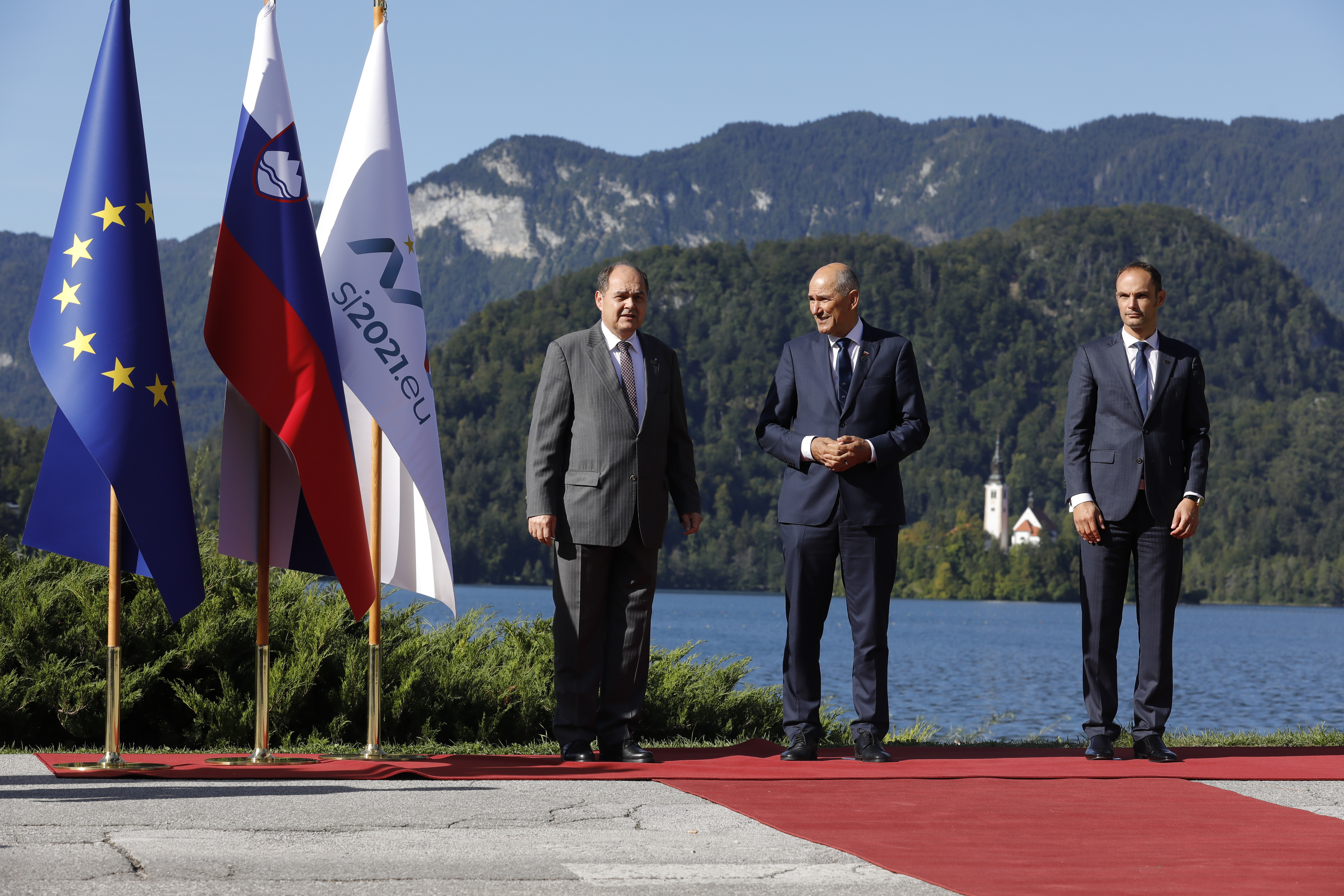
Schmidt alongside Slovenian Prime Minister Janez Janša (centre) and Foreign Minister Anže Logar, 1 September 2021

In January 2021, the German government nominated Schmidt to be the new High Representative for Bosnia and Herzegovina. On 27 May 2021, Austrian diplomat Valentin Inzko resigned from his office of the High Representative. On 1 August, he was officially appointed by the Peace Implementation Council as the new High Representative, succeeding Inzko.

In November 2021, Schmidt gave his first report to the United Nations secretary-general, warning that Bosnia and Herzegovina was in imminent danger of breaking apart with a possible return to conflict, and warned that if this happened, international military presence should be reviewed.

Schmidt imposed changes to Bosnia and Herzegovina's electoral law after voting hours ended for the 2022 general election. The changes prominently included an expansion of the Federal House of Peoples from 56 to 80 members, changes in the election process for the house as well as changes in the election process for the president and vice presidents of the Federation of Bosnia and Herzegovina. An earlier draft of election law changes that leaked in July was met with protests in the capital Sarajevo. The draft was also criticised by Bisera Turković, the Foreign Minister of Bosnia and Herzegovina and the Iranian embassy, claiming it "consolidates the ethnic divisions". The changes received support from the United States and the United Kingdom embassies.

==== Contestations of legitimacy ====
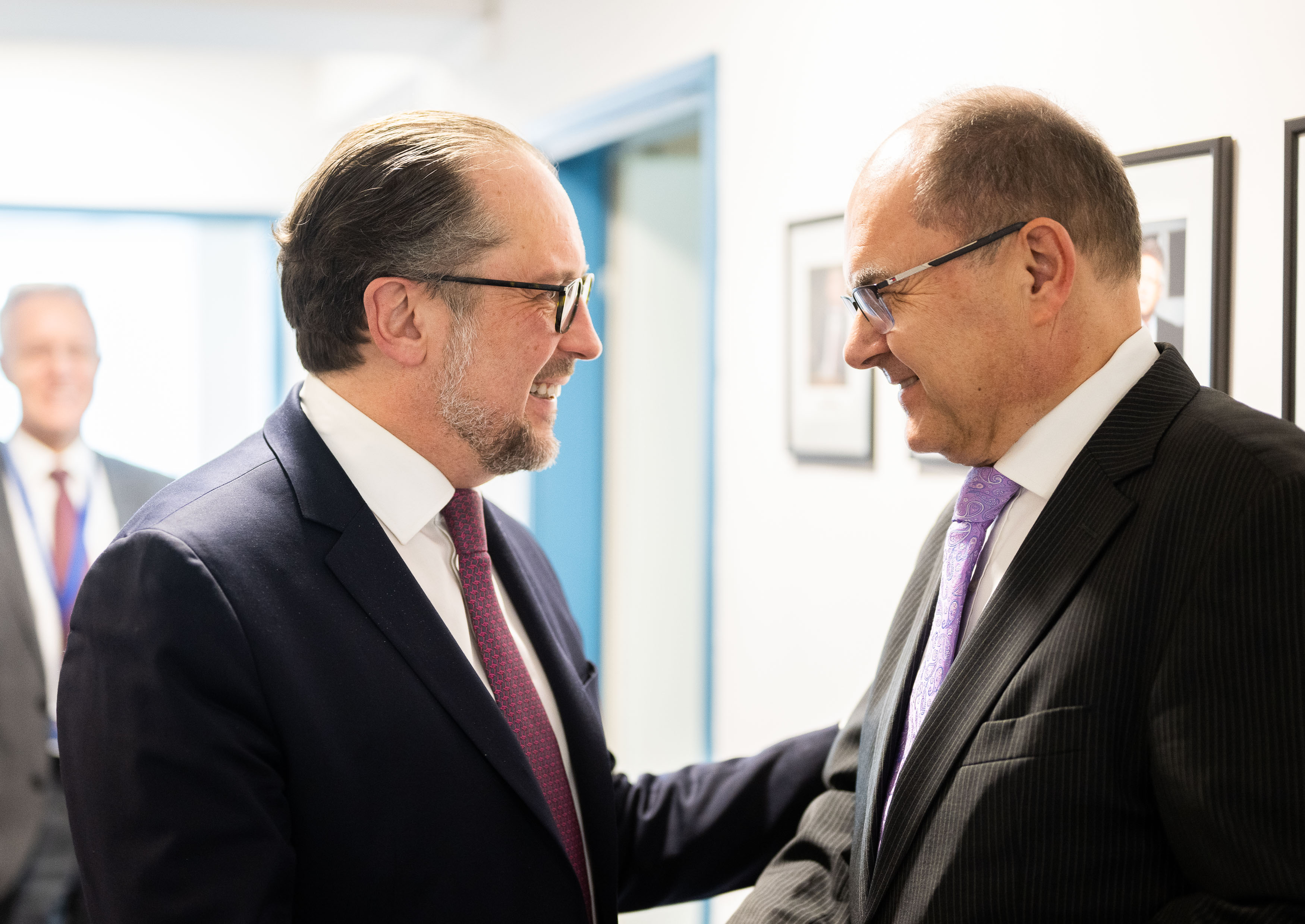
Schmidt with Austrian Foreign Minister Alexander Schallenberg, 10 March 2023

Russia and China have opposed Schmidt's appointment, do not recognize the legality and legitimacy of Schmidt’s election and refuse to recognize his authority, as he was appointed without a corresponding United Nations Security Council resolution nor was he chosen or approved on a broad consensus by the Peace Implementation Council, as was the case for previous High Representatives.

In addition to Russia and China in the international arena, several domestic political leaders also repudiate Schmidt or his decisions.

On 28 April 2023, after months of political deadlock in the formation of a new government of the Federation of Bosnia and Herzegovina, following the 2022 general election, Schmidt intervened by suspending the Constitution of the Federation of Bosnia and Herzegovina for twenty-four hours, with Social Democratic Party president Nermin Nikšić getting appointed as the new Federal Prime Minister. His appointment is deemed unconstitutional by at least two opposition leaders of parliamentary parties due to Schmidt's intervention. At the same time, Fadil Novalić, whom Nikšić succeeded as Prime Minister thanks to Schmidt's intervention, refused to concede the power and continues contesting his forceable deposing as illegal and unconstitutional.

In June 2023, the National Assembly of Republika Srpska voted to suspend rulings by the Constitutional Court of Bosnia and Herzegovina and stopping publishing the High Representative's decrees and laws in the official gazette. Following this decision, Schmidt declared that he had annulled the two laws which the Assembly had adopted, citing that the decisions "directly violate the constitutional order of Bosnia and Herzegovina and the Dayton peace agreement."

On 26 March 2024, Schmidt imposed a new set of changes to Bosnia and Herzegovina’s election law, announcing the implementation of electronic vote-counting, electronic identification and digital voting stations at a limited number of locations in a pilot scheme. Bosnian Serb leader Milorad Dodik threatened that Serbs would block the work of the country’s national government unless the election laws imposed by Schmidt were "annulled" and "Western ambassadors expelled from the country."

==== Resignation ====
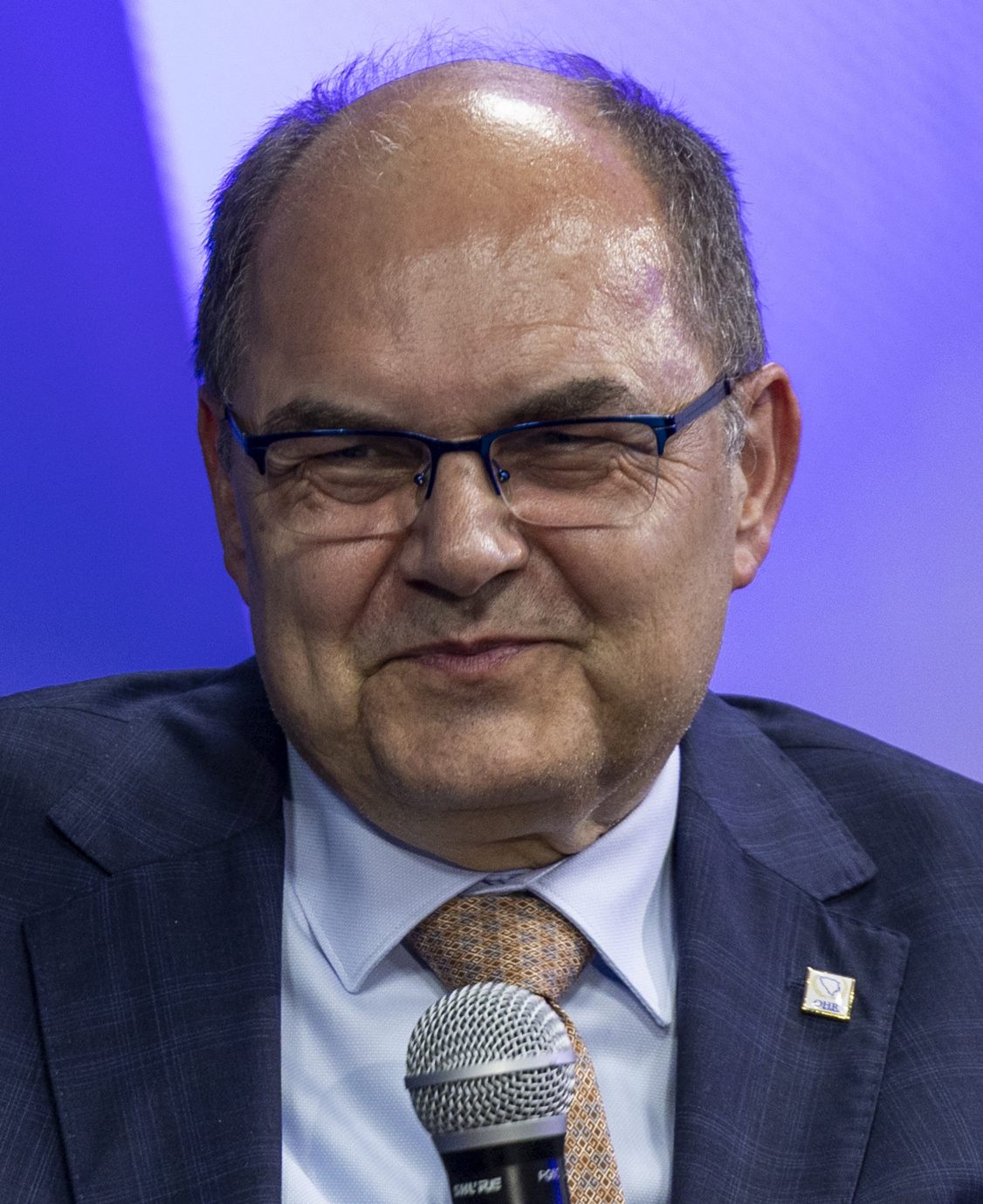
Schmidt in June 2026, a month after announcing his resignation

On 11 May 2026, Schmidt announced his resignation as High Representative, with a new representative planning to be appointed by 14 July. This came after the U.S. demanded Schmidt's immediate resignation, away from a previous agreement where he would stay in his post until elections in October. His term ended on 1 July 2026, and was succeeded by International Supervisor for Brčko and Principal Deputy High Representative Louis Crishock as acting High Representative.

== Political positions ==
In August 2012, Schmidt was one of 124 members of the Bundestag to sign a letter that was sent to the Russian ambassador to Germany, Vladimir Grinin, expressing concern over the trial against the three members of Pussy Riot. “Being held in detention for months and the threat of lengthy punishment are draconian and disproportionate,” the lawmakers said in the letter. “In a secular and pluralist state, peaceful artistic acts -- even if they can be seen as provocative -- must not lead to the accusation of serious criminal acts that lead to lengthy prison terms.”

== Other activities ==
=== Corporate boards ===
- Deutsche Bahn, Member of the Supervisory Board (since 2018)
- KfW, Member of the Supervisory Board (2014–2018)
- Landwirtschaftliche Rentenbank, Deputy Chairman of the Supervisory Board (2014–2018)

=== Non-profit organizations ===
- Leo Baeck Foundation, Member of the Board of Trustees
- Society for Defense and Security Policy (GfW), Member of the Board of Trustees
- German Atlantic Society, President (since 2006)
- Society for Christian-Jewish Cooperation, Co-Chairman (since 2013)
- German Council on Foreign Relations (DGAP), Chairman of the Czech Republic Discussion Group
- Coordination Council for German-Czech Dialogue, Member of the Board
- Foundation for the Examination of the Dictatorship in East Germany, Member of the Board of Trustees
- American Jewish Committee in Berlin, Member of the Advisory Board
- Hanns Seidel Foundation, Deputy Chairman of the Board
- Help for Self-Help e.V., Honorary Member of the Board
- Comrades Association of Alpine Troops in Munich, Member
- German Foundation for Peace Research (DSF), Ex-Officio Member of the Board of Trustees (2009–2013)
- Centre for International Peace Operations (ZIF), Ex-Officio Member of the Supervisory Board (2009–2013)
- Car and Travel Club Germany (ARCD), Member of the Presidium (1993–2007)
- Free World Commission, Scowcroft Center for Strategy and Security (Atlantic Council), Member (2020–)

== Recognition ==
- 2004 – Commander of the Order of Three Stars for the Republic of Latvia
- 2005 – Commander for the Order of Merit for the Republic of Lithuania
- 2005 – Cross of the Order of Merit for the Federal Republic of Germany
- 2007 – Bavarian Distinguished Service Award
- 2012 – Honourable Accolade of the First Degree for National Defence, Hungary
- 2013 – Order of Ante Starčević, Croatia

Diplomatic posts
Preceded by Valentin Inzko	High Representative for Bosnia and Herzegovina; 2021–2026	Succeeded by Louis Crishock (acting)
