= Limes (Italian magazine) =

Italian geopolitical magazine

- Editor: Lucio Caracciolo
- Categories: International relations
- Frequency: Monthly
- Publisher: Gruppo Editoriale L'Espresso
- First issue: 1993; 33 years ago
- Country: Italy
- Based in: Rome
- Language: Italian
- Website: Limesonline

Limes (pronounced [ˈliːmes]) is a monthly Italian geopolitical magazine published in Rome, Italy.

== History and profile ==
Limes was established in 1993. The magazine, published every month, is owned by Gruppo Editoriale L'Espresso. Lucio Caracciolo is the editor of the magazine. It had two sister publications: the English-language Heartland, Eurasian Review of Geopolitics (2000–?), as well as the Serbo-Croatian Limesplus (2013–2020, available papers are in Serbian and English).

Members of the scientific and editorial board of Limes include Geminello Alvi, Furio Colombo, Giuseppe Cucchi, Emanuela Del Re, Ilvo Diamanti, Augusto Fantozzi, Tito Favaretto, Ernesto Galli della Loggia, Carlo Jean, Enrico Letta, Ricardo Franco Levi, Vincenzo Paglia, Angelo Panebianco, Romano Prodi, Giulio Tremonti, Antonio Zanardi Landi, Luigi Zanda, Guido Barendson, Pierluigi Battista, Andrea Damascelli, Włodek Goldkorn, Paolo Morawski, David Polansky, Alessandro Politi, Antonio Sema, and Enzo Traverso. One of the members is Centrex CEO Massimo Nicolazzi, who writes about energy-related topics, including those related to Russia.

== See also ==
- List of magazines published in Italy
