= Brčko =

- City
- Grad Brčko; Град Брчко; City of Brčko
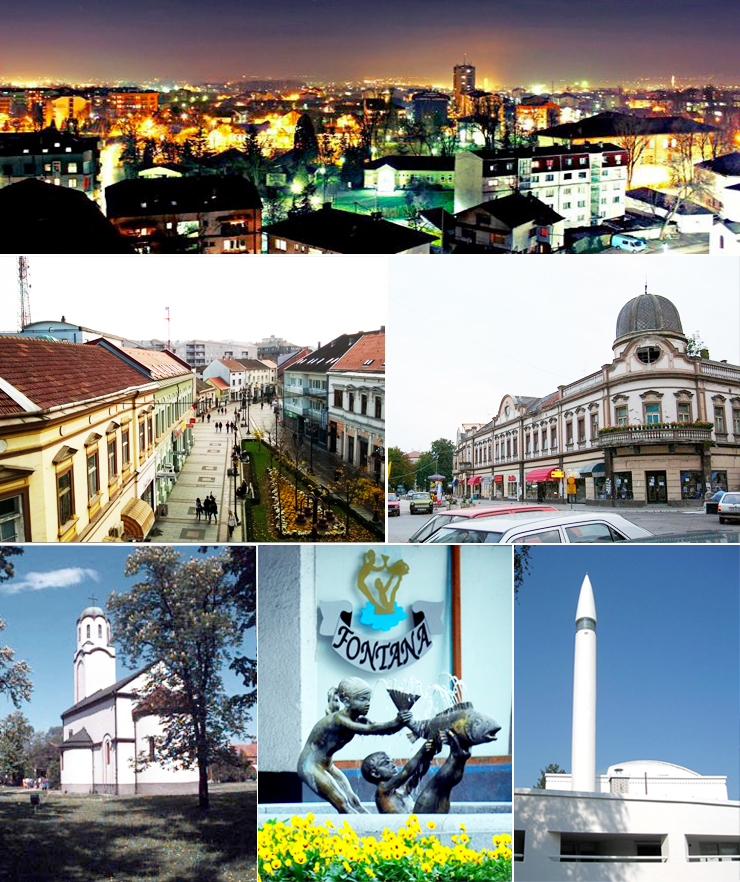
- Brčko
- Interactive map of Brčko
- Location within Bosnia and Herzegovina Brčko (Balkans)
- Coordinates: 44°52′38″N 18°48′40″E
- Country: Bosnia and Herzegovina
- District: Brčko District
- Geographical region: Posavina

Government
  - Mayor: Siniša Milić (SNSD)
  - President of the District Assembly: Damir Bulčević (NiP)

Area
  - Total: 402 km^{2} (155 sq mi)
- Elevation: 92 m (302 ft)

Population (2013)
  - Total: 39,893
  - Density: 99.2/km^{2} (257/sq mi)
  - Brčko District: 83,516
- Postcode: 76100 (Pošte Srpske); 76120 (BH Pošta)
- Area code: +387 049
- Website: www.bdcentral.net

Brčko (pronounced [br̩̂tʃkoː]) is a city and the administrative seat of Brčko District, in northern Bosnia and Herzegovina. It lies on the banks of Sava river across from Croatia. As of 2013, it has a population of 39,893 inhabitants.

De jure, the Brčko District belongs to both entities of Bosnia and Herzegovina (the Federation of Bosnia and Herzegovina and Republika Srpska) but in practice it is not governed by either; practically, Brčko is a self-governing free city.

== Name ==
Its name is very likely linked to the Breuci (Greek Βρεῦκοι), one of the Pannonian tribes of the Illyrians who migrated to the vicinity of today's Brčko from the territories of the Yamnaya culture in the 3rd millennium BC. Breuci greatly resisted the Romans but were conquered in 1st century BC and many were sold as slaves after their defeat. They started receiving Roman citizenship during Trajan's rule.

A number of Breuci migrated and settled in Dacia, where a town called Bereck or Brețcu, a river (Brețcu River) and a mountain Munții Brețcului in today's Romania were named after them.

== Geography ==
Brčko District and Brčko town

The city is on the north, riparian border of Bosnia, across the Sava River from the village of Gunja in Croatia.

Brčko is the seat of the Brčko District, an independent unit of local self-government created on the territory of Bosnia and Herzegovina following an arbitration process. The local administration was formerly supervised by an international supervisory regime headed by Principal Deputy High Representative who is also ex officio the Brčko International Supervisor. This international supervision was frozen since 23 May 2012.

== History ==
Upon the conclusion of the Treaty of Passarowitz in 1718, Brčko was to be transferred to the Habsburg monarchy.

During the 1862 exodus of Muslims from Serbia, some Belgrade Muslims who were expelled by the Serbian government settled in the town.

In the Bosnian War, Brčko was the location of the Brčko bridge massacre on 30 April 1992. Later, it was the narrowest point of the Brčko corridor that connected two parts of Republika Srpska.

Brčko was a geographic point of contention in 1996 when the U.S.-led Implementation Force (IFOR) built Camp McGovern between the villages of Brod and Brka. Camp McGovern under the overwatch of 3-5 CAV 1/BDE/1AR Division (US) was constructed from a war torn farming cooperative structure in the Zone of Separation (ZOS) for the purpose of establishing peacekeeping operations. The mission was to separate the former warring factions. The ZOS was one kilometer wide of no man's land, where special permission was required for Serbian or Bosnian forces to enter. Various checkpoints and observation points (OP's) were established to control the separation.

Although Brčko was a focal point for tension in the late 1990s, considerable progress in multi-ethnic integration in Brčko has since occurred including integration of secondary schooling. Reconstruction efforts and the Property Law Implementation Plan have improved the situation regarding property and return. Today, Brčko has returned to a strategic transshipment point along the Sava River. The population of Brčko has not returned to its pre-war ethnic mix of Bosniaks, Serbs, and Croats. Brčko sits at the east–west apex of Republika Srpska, the ethnic Serb portion of Bosnia & Herzegovina, and as such is critical to the RS for its economic future.

Brčko was one of the main points discussed in the Dayton Peace Accords. After several weeks of intensive negotiation, the issue of Brčko was to be decided by international arbitration. Brčko Arbitration ruled in Feb 1997 that Brčko would be managed by an ambassadorial representative from the international community. The first Ambassador to Brčko was an American with support staff from the UK, Sweden, Denmark & France. Brčko Arbitration in March 1998 suggested the Brcko area could be a special district, which they finally decided likewise in March 1999.

The first international organization to open office in Brčko at that time was the Organization for Security and Cooperation in Europe (OSCE).

Following PIC meeting on 23 May 2012, it was decided to suspend, not terminate, the mandate of Brčko International Supervisor. Brčko Arbitral Tribunal, together with the suspended Brčko Supervision, will still continue to exist.

== Demographics ==
Ethnic composition
	2013	1991	1981	1971	1961
Total	39,893 (100.0%)	41,406 (100.0%)	31,437 (100.0%)	25,337 (100.0%)	17,949 (100.0%)
Serbs	19,420 (48.68%)	8,253 (19.93%)	5,532 (17.60%)	5,481 (21.63%)	5,260 (29.31%)
Bosniaks	17,489 (43.84%)	22,994 (55.53%)	16,725 (53.20%)	15,651 (61.77%)	5,431 (30.26%)
Croats	1,457 (3.652%)	2,894 (6.989%)	2,157 (6.861%)	2,663 (10.51%)	2,472 (13.77%)
Others	996 (2.497%)	2,054 (4.961%)	468 (1.489%)	327 (1.291%)	78 (0.435%)
Roma	333 (0.835%)		5 (0.016%)	6 (0.024%)	4 (0.022%)
Albanians	77 (0.193%)		86 (0.274%)	115 (0.454%)	65 (0.362%)
Yugoslavs	60 (0.150%)	5,211 (12.59%)	6,351 (20.20%)	952 (3.757%)	4,250 (23.68%)
Montenegrins	31 (0.078%)		65 (0.207%)	82 (0.324%)	278 (1.549%)
Macedonians	24 (0.060%)		16 (0.051%)	19 (0.075%)	35 (0.195%)
Slovenes	4 (0.010%)		19 (0.060%)	25 (0.099%)	55 (0.306%)
Turks	2 (0.005%)				
Hungarians			13 (0.041%)	16 (0.063%)	21 (0.117%)

== Transport ==
=== Rail ===
A railway station is near the city centre on the line from Vinkovci to Tuzla. However, no passenger trains operate to Brčko anymore. The closest operating railway station is in Gunja, Croatia; just on the other side of the border.

=== Water ===
Brčko has the largest river port in Bosnia, on the Sava river.

== Sport ==
Brčko has several football clubs (FK Jedinstvo Brčko, FK Lokomotiva Brčko, FK Izbor Brčko, FK Dizdaruša Brčko and the youngest club FK Ilićka 01). They all play in the Second League of Republika Srpska. The city is home to some of the most successful volleyball teams in the country Mladost and Jedinstvo.

== Education ==
The city is home to an economics school of the University of East Sarajevo and a local theatre festival.

== Gallery ==
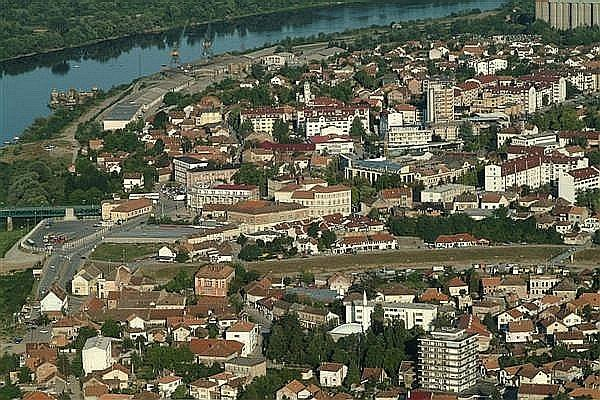
Panorama of Brčko

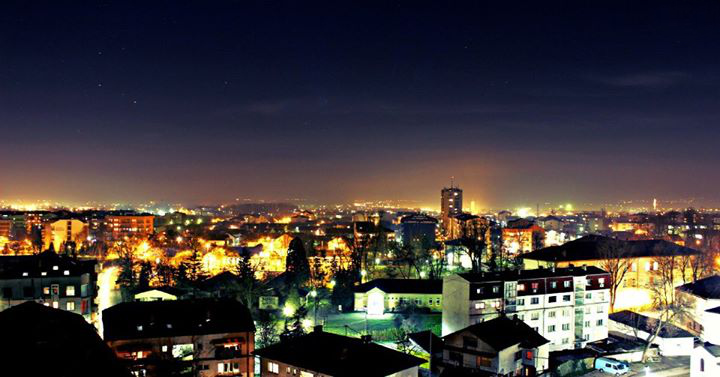
Brčko at night

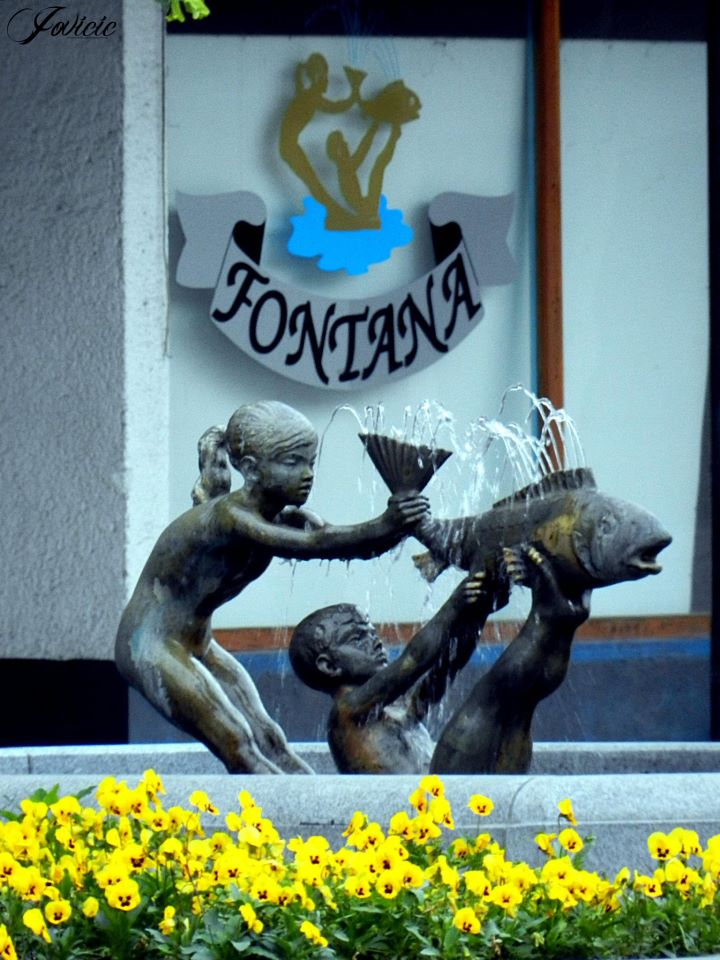
Fountain - the symbol of the city

== Twin towns – sister cities ==
Brčko is twinned with:

- Samsun, Turkey
- Smederevska Palanka, Serbia
- St. Louis, United States

== Notable people ==
- Bekim Sejranović, writer
- Vera Božičković-Popović, painter
- Edo Maajka, rapper
- Lepa Brena, singer
- Edvin Kanka Ćudić, human rights activist
- Mladen Petrić, Croatian footballer
- Vesna Pisarović, singer
- Dženana Šehanović, pianist
- Anton Maglica, Croatian footballer
- Jasmin Imamović, politician
- Nataša Vojnović, Serbian fashion model
- Mato Tadić, judge
- Brankica Mihajlović, Serbian volleyball player, World and European champion, silver medalist at the 2016 Summer Olympics
- Ines Janković, Serbian fashion designer
- Nikola Kovač, professional Counter-Strike: Global Offensive player
- Kenan Trebinčević, Author

== Bibliography ==
- Roksandić, Drago (2007-10-01). "Posavska krajina/granica od 1718. do 1739. godine". Ekonomska i ekohistorija: časopis za gospodarsku povijest i povijest okoliša (in Serbo-Croatian) (3): 62–82. eISSN 1849-0190.
- Pelidija, Enes (1989). Bosanski ejalet od Karlovačkog do Požarevačkog mira 1699 - 1718 (in Serbo-Croatian). Sarajevo. pp. 237–259.
