= List of mayors of Brčko District =

Mayor of Brčko District
- Gradonačelnik Brčko distrikta
- Incumbent; Siniša Milić since 29 November 2024
- Appointer: Brčko District Assembly
- Term length: 4 years, unlimited number of renewals
- Inaugural holder: Siniša Kisić
- Formation: 8 March 2000
- Website: www.vlada.bdcentral.net

This article lists the Mayors of Brčko District since the independence of Bosnia and Herzegovina, the self-governing administrative unit located in the country's north-east.

From 1995 until 2000, the city Brčko was under the temporary authority of Republika Srpska, one of the two entities of Bosnia and Herzegovina, as one of its municipalities. Following the final arbitration award, Brčko District was constituted in 2000 under the direct sovereignty of the state, formally held in condominium by both entities, united based on the boundaries of the pre-war Brčko municipality, with the Mayor having authority over the entire District.

== List of mayors ==
=== Municipality of Brčko (1990–1992) (Republic of Bosnia and Herzegovina control) ===
Party of Democratic Action

No.	Name (Birth–Death)	Term of office		Party
1	Mustafa Ramić	December 1990	7 May 1992	SDA

=== Municipality of Brčko (1995–2000) (Republika Srpska control) ===
Serb Democratic Party Socialist Party

No.	Name (Birth–Death)	Term of office		Party
1	Miodrag Pajić (born 1950)	14 December 1995 (Note: Signals assumption of authority under the framework of the Dayton Accord. Pajić took office as Mayor during the war jurisdiction of Republika Srpska in March 1994.)	13 November 1997	SDS
2	Borko Reljić (born 1952)	13 November 1997	15 April 1999	SDS
3	Siniša Kisić (1954–2020)	15 April 1999	8 March 2000 (Note: Kisić was Mayor under the authority of the Republika Srpska-jurisdiction municipality from 15 April 1999 until the establishment of Brčko District on 8 March 2000. He continued to serve as Mayor under the new legal authority of Brčko District under self-government and formal condominium jurisdiction until 12 November 2003.)	SP

=== Brčko District (2000–present) (Self-governing under formal condominium) ===
Socialist Party New Croatian Initiative Social Democratic Party Alliance of Independent Social Democrats Croatian Democratic Union Party of Democratic Action Party for Bosnia and Herzegovina

No.	Name (Birth–Death)	Term of office		Party
1	Siniša Kisić (1954–2020)	8 March 2000	12 November 2003	SP
—	Ivan Krndelj (born 1959); Acting	12 November 2003	3 December 2003	NHI
2	Branko Damjanac (born 1947)	3 December 2003	8 December 2004	SP
3	Mirsad Đapo (born 1953)	8 December 2004	12 February 2009	SDP BiH
4	Dragan Pajić (born 1956)	12 February 2009	14 September 2011	SNSD
5	Miroslav Gavrić (born 1971)	14 September 2011	23 November 2012	SNSD
6	Anto Domić (born 1967)	23 November 2012	16 November 2016	HDZ BiH
7	Siniša Milić (born 1971)	16 November 2016	10 December 2020	SNSD
—	Anto Domić (born 1967); Acting	10 December 2020	23 December 2020	HDZ BiH
8	Esed Kadrić (born 1979)	23 December 2020	15 March 2023	SDA
9	Zijad Nišić (born 1961)	15 March 2023	29 November 2024	SBiH
(7)	Siniša Milić (born 1971)	29 November 2024	Incumbent	SNSD

== See also ==
- Brčko
- Brčko District
- International Supervisor for Brčko
