= Walter Kolbow =

German politician (1944–2024)

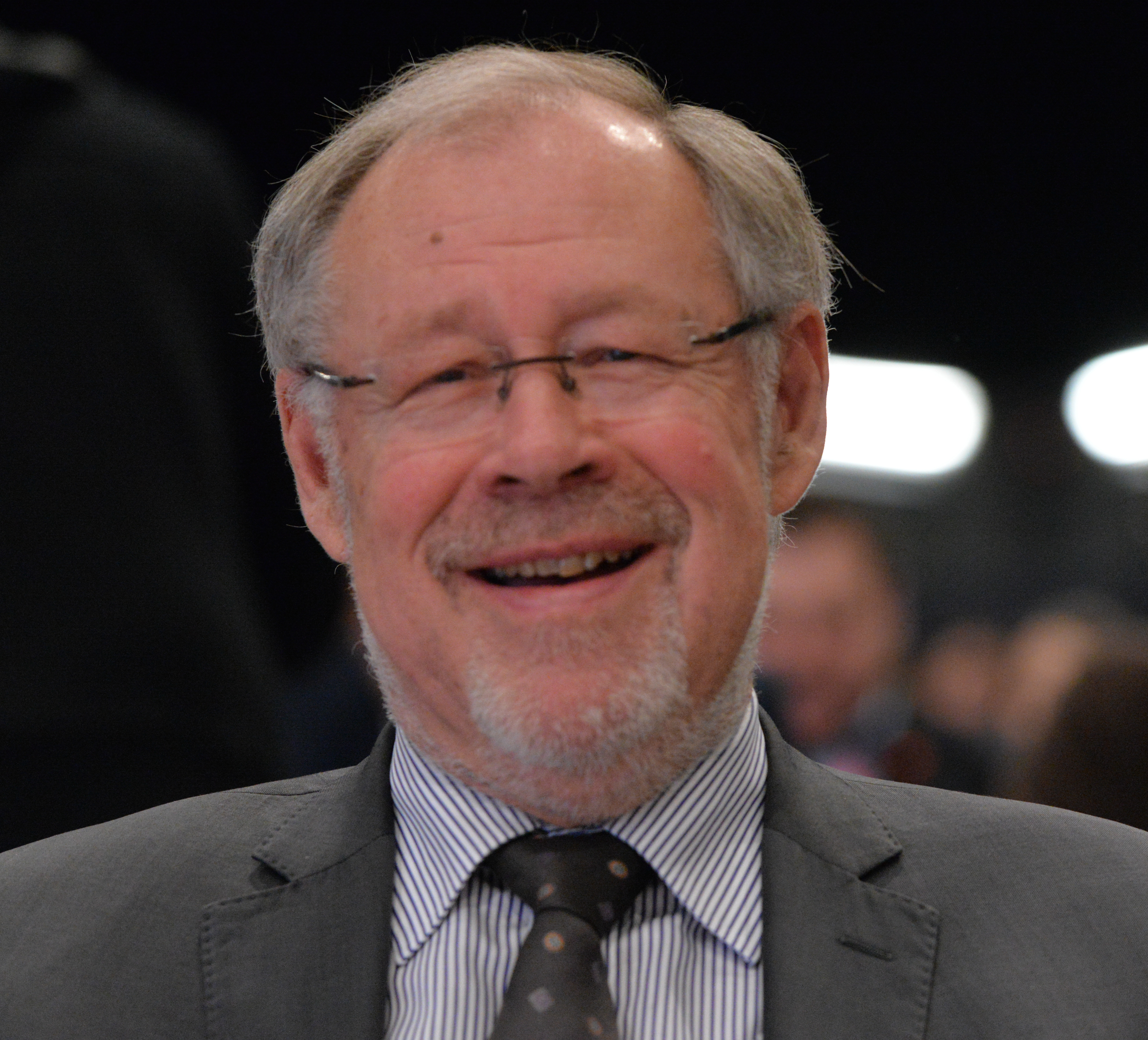
- Kolbow in 2015

Parliamentarian State Secretary of the Federal Ministry of Defense
- In office 27 October 1998 – 22 November 2005
- Chancellor: Gerhard Schröder
- Preceded by: Christian Schmidt

Member of the Bundestag
- In office 5 October 1980 – 27 September 2009

Personal details
- Born: 27 April 1944 Spittal an der Drau, Reichsgau Kärnten, Nazi Germany
- Died: 28 April 2024 (aged 80) Ochsenfurt, Bavaria, Germany
- Party: Social Democratic Party of Germany
- Education: University of Würzburg
- Profession: Lawyer

Walter Kolbow (27 April 1944 – 28 April 2024) was a German politician of the SPD. He was Parliamentary State Secretary (1998–2005) in the Federal Ministry of Defense, as well as deputy chairman of SPD Parliamentary Group in German Bundestag (2005–2009).

== Early life and career ==
After primary school in Ingolstadt and Ochsenfurt (Bavaria), Kolbow graduated from Röntgen-Gymnasium Würzburg in 1964 and subsequently served his compulsory military duty until 1966 at the German Air Force. He was Captain of the reserve. Afterwards, Kolbow studied law at the University of Würzburg and the German University of Administrative Sciences in Speyer. In 1970 he obtained the Erstes Juristisches Staatsexamen and in 1974 the Zweites Juristisches Staatsexamen. The year after, Kolbow started working for the local administration of Frankfurt. Between 1978 and 1980 he did scientific research for the Friedrich Ebert Foundation.

== Political career ==
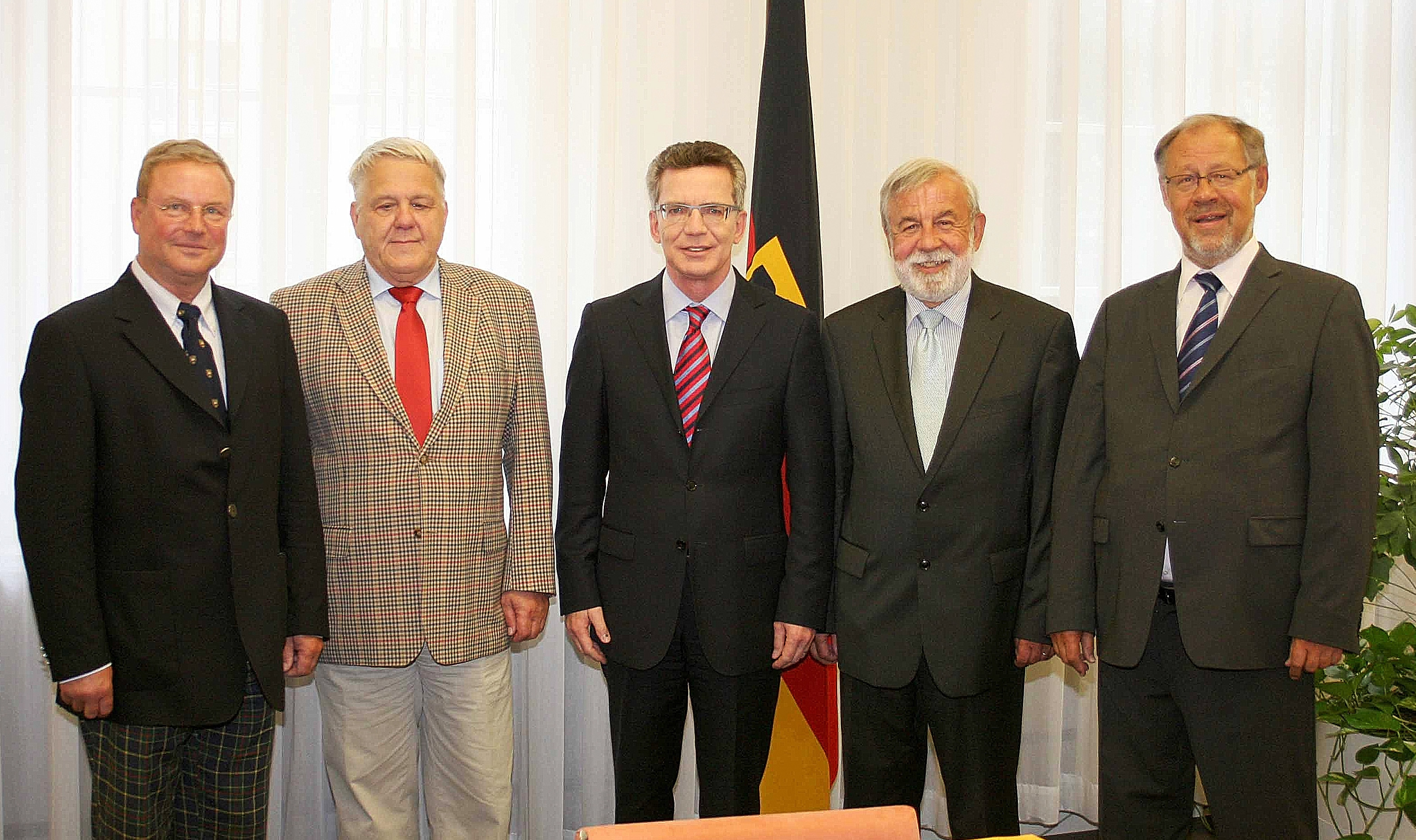

Kolbow joined the Social Democratic Party of Germany (SPD) in 1967. Until 2008 he was chairman of the regional section of Unterfranken (Bavaria). He was its honorary chairman.

Between 1972 until 1976 Kolbow was member of the city council of Ochsenfurt, as well as between 1978 until 1981 of Würzburg.

In the 1980 West German elections, Kolbow became a Member of the German Bundestag. Between 1994 until 1998 he was his parliamentary group's spokesperson for defense policy. As a result of the 1998 elections, he joined the Federal Government of Chancellor Gerhard Schröder and was appointed Parliamentary State Secretary at the Federal Ministry of Defense under the leadership of successive ministers Rudolf Scharping and Peter Struck until 2005. During his time in office, he also served as Germany´s "Humanitarian Representative to Macedonia" coordinating humanitarian aid in Macedonia. Moreover, Kolbow was well respected for his commitment to injured German soldiers because of radar radiation and posttraumatic stress disorder (PTSD).

Between 2005 and 2009, Kolbow was vice chairperson of the SPD parliamentary group, responsible for foreign and development politics, defense matters and human rights since 2005. After 29 years of parliamentary work Kolbow retired from the German Bundestag in 2009.

After leaving active politics, Kolbow became counsel of the Berlin Consulting Group supporting public and private institutions in the field of health in Europe. He also served as chairman of the "Commission on Security and Bundeswehr Issues" which gives advice to SPD´s federal steering committee.

== Other activities ==
- Federal Academy for Security Policy (BAKS), Member of the Advisory Board (since 2015)
- Friedrich Ebert Foundation (FES), Member

== Personal life and death ==
Kolbow was married and has two children. His son, Alexander Kolbow (SPD), is city councillor of Würzburg.

Walter Kolbow died in Ochsenfurt on 28 April 2024, at the age of 80.

== Recognition ==
- 2009 – Constitutional Medal in silver
- 2009 – "Honoris Causa"-Medal for being "Upfront with the audience" by Carneval Club Versbach (Würzburg)
- 2009 – Honorary Ring of the City of Würzburg
- 2012 – Order of Merit of the Federal Republic of Germany
