= Antonio Zanardi Landi =

Italian diplomat (born 1950)

His excellence Antonio Zanardi Landi di Veano
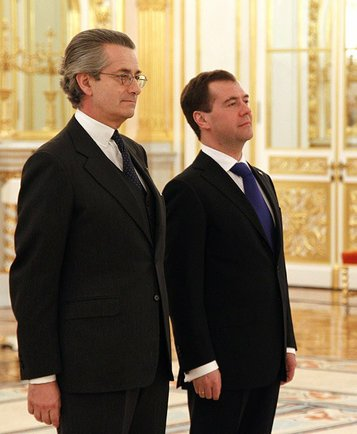
- Antonio Zanardi with Russia's president Dmitry Medvedev

Sovereign Order of Malta Ambassador to the Holy See
- Incumbent
- Assumed office 2 September 2016
- Preceded by: Gian Luca Chiavari

Italy Ambassador to Russia
- In office 8 February 2011 – 6 July 2013
- Preceded by: Vittorio Claudio Surdo
- Succeeded by: Cesare Maria Ragaglini

Italy Ambassador to the Holy See
- In office 4 October 2007 – 17 December 2010
- Preceded by: Giuseppe Balboni Acqua
- Succeeded by: Francesco Maria Greco

Italy Ambassador to Serbia and Montenegro
- In office 18 March 2004 – 3 January 2006
- Preceded by: Giuseppe Balboni Acqua
- Succeeded by: Francesco Maria Greco

Personal details
- Born: 24 May 1950 (age 76) Udine, Italy
- Citizenship: Italy Sovereign Order of Malta
- Children: 3
- Education: University of Padua

Antonio Zanardi Landi di Veano (born 24 May 1950) is an Italian diplomat. He currently serves as the Sovereign Military Order of Malta's ambassador to the Holy See and a member of the Sovereign Council of the Order of Malta.

== Biography ==
Zanardi was born in Udine on 24 May 1950. He graduated with a law degree from the University of Padua. After finishing military service, he was employed at FIAT.

He started his diplomatic career in 1978. In the academic year 1979-80, he became the first Italian to be enrolled at the École nationale d'administration (ENA) in Paris. The next year, he worked in the General Secretariat of the Ministry of Foreign Affairs, and later in the Foreign Minister's cabinet and the Minister's office for relations with the Parliament.

Outside Italy, Zanardi worked at Italian embassies in Ottawa, Tehran, London and the Holy See.

From 1996 to 2000, Zanardi was Secretary General of the European University Institute in Florence.

From 2004 to 2006, he was the Italian ambassador to Serbia and Montenegro, and from 2006 to 2007, he was the Deputy Secretary General of the Ministry of Foreign Affairs. From 2007 to 2010, he was the Italian ambassador to the Holy See and the Sovereign Military Order of Malta. From 2010 to 2013, he was ambassador to Russia and Turkmenistan. From 2013, he served as the President's diplomatic advisor. Since 2016, Zanardi has been the Sovereign Military Order of Malta's ambassador to the Holy See and has been a member of the Sovereign Council since 2022.

In May 2026, Zanardi became a candidate for the post of High Representative for Bosnia and Herzegovina.

== Honours ==
Ribbon	Distinction	Country	Date	Reference
	Kinght Grand Cross of the Order of St. Gregory the Great	Holy See	7 November 1995	
	Order of Merit of the Italian Republic 4th Class	Italy	27 December 1995	
	Order of Merit of the Italian Republic 3rd Class	Italy	29 November 2004	
	Order of Merit of the Italian Republic 2nd Class	Italy	18 January 2006	
	Grad Officer of the Order of the Star of Italy	Italy	27 December 2007	
	Kinght Grand Cross of the Order of Pope Pius IX	Holy See	25 May 2010	
	Order of Friendship	Russia	10 September 2013	
	Order of Merit of the Italian Republic 1st Class	Italy	13 October 2014	
	Bailiff Knights Grand Cross of Honour and Devotion	Sovereign Military Order of Malta	Unknown	
