= Bonn Powers =

Political powers in Bosnia and Herzegovina

Bonn Powers (Bosnian and Croatian: Bonske ovlasti; Serbian: Бонска овлашћења) are a range of powers given to the High Representative for Bosnia and Herzegovina which include imposing and annulling the laws and appointing and removing officials. They were introduced in 1997 to extend the powers of the High Representative and their legality remains questionable.

== Background ==
The Dayton Peace Agreement, signed in November 1995, introduced several key mechanisms to ensure its implementation and stability in Bosnia and Herzegovina. The agreement incorporated democratic elections, a judiciary framework, and international oversight.

The Organization for Security and Cooperation in Europe (OSCE), led by the United States, was assigned control over elections through the Provisional Electorate Commission to promote moderate political outcomes.

The court consists of nine judges: two appointed by the National Assembly of Republika Srpska, four (two Croats and two Bosniaks) appointed by the House of Representatives of the Federation of Bosnia and Herzegovina, and three international judges selected by the President of the European Court of Human Rights. The international judges play a decisive role in resolving deadlocks on constitutional matters.

The Office of the High Representative (OHR): Established under Annex 10 of the DPA, the OHR was created to oversee civilian implementation and facilitate international intervention if necessary.

=== Peace Implementation Council ===
Following the agreement, concerns arose over the OHR's political legitimacy, particularly due to US opposition to significant UN involvement. In response, the Peace Implementation Council (PIC) was formed at a conference in London in December 1995 to coordinate financial and political support for BiH's stabilisation. The PIC absorbed the authority of the International Conference on the Former Yugoslavia (ICFY) and provided a structure for international oversight, allowing European states to have a role in BiH's post-war governance.

From the U.S. perspective, the mechanisms of the Dayton Peace Agreement were designed to balance international control while limiting extensive UN involvement. The PIC played a crucial role in overseeing the political and economic reconstruction of BiH.

=== Nation-building process ===
Following the signing of the DPA, the United States strategy for implementation in Bosnia and Herzegovina initially relied on regional political leaders, notably Franjo Tuđman (Croatia) and Slobodan Milošević (Serbia), as intermediaries to facilitate the process. However, this approach limited US involvement in broader regional democratisation efforts, particularly concerning Serbia and the status of Kosovo and Montenegro.

By the end of 1997, the US government decided to remove Tuđman and Milošević from their roles in the implementation process, opting instead for direct engagement with BiH's political leadership. This shift aimed to address the power vacuum left by their removal and reinforce institutional reforms within BiH.

The PIC was established to oversee the implementation of the DPA; however, its legality has been questioned, as it was created after the treaty had already been signed and enacted. Despite this, the PIC played a key role in expanding the authority of the High Representative, particularly through the Bonn Powers, which allowed the HR to impose and annul laws.

According to O'Brien, the political environment in BiH shifted dramatically after the fall of Milošević and the conclusion of the war in Kosovo. These events allowed for a more coordinated international campaign, particularly against nationalist factions within BiH. The United States played a leading role in directing the peace implementation process, with strong oversight over the High Representative. High Representative Wolfgang Petritsch openly acknowledged his accountability to the U.S. Ambassador in BiH, underscoring American dominance in shaping policy decisions. The U.S. approach emphasized a zero-tolerance stance on errors, as illustrated by the rigorous standards imposed by U.S. representatives.

In 2000, the Constitutional Court of Bosnia and Herzegovina addressed key legal questions regarding the powers of the OHR. Its ruling in case U 9/00 introduced the concept of "functional duality". According to this principle, one legal system operated under the BiH constitution, while another derived from the international community's authority. The OHR, empowered by its Bonn powers, could intervene directly in BiH's legal order, often supplanting the role of state institutions. Nevertheless, the Constitutional Court emphasized its limits, asserting that it had no jurisdiction to assess the legislative activities of the High Representative since these powers were not granted by the BiH constitution.

In the lead-up to the general elections of 2000, the OSCE, under U.S. leadership, imposed new electoral regulations. These reforms altered the method by which representatives were elected to the House of Peoples of the Federation of Bosnia and Herzegovina. Specifically, they restructured the election process to enhance Bosniak influence over Croat representation, sparking legal challenges from Bosnian Croat parties.

The Constitutional Court, comprising Bosniak and international judges, ultimately rejected the Croat parties' complaints. This ruling confirmed the validity of the OSCE's electoral reforms, despite the Croats' argument that such decisions violated the BiH constitution and the Dayton Peace Agreement. The Court maintained that the OSCE, though an international body, had the authority to enact electoral changes—a decision that further underscored the complex and often contentious balance between domestic constitutional law and international governance in BiH.

In response, the Croatian National Assembly declared a provisional self-government in 2001, rejecting the legitimacy of the imposed changes. The OHR, backed by NATO's SFOR, intervened by raiding Hercegovačka Banka, the financial backbone of the Croat nationalist movement, and installing international oversight. Despite finding no illegal activities after six years of auditing, the bank was ultimately returned to the Federation BiH but soon went bankrupt. Lacking financial support, the Croat National Assembly disbanded, and Croat leaders returned to participation within state institutions.

The changes in the House of Peoples of the FBiH significantly diminished Croat influence, effectively transforming the Federation into a Bosniak-dominated entity. This shift allowed for the imposition of a wide range of laws and policies that further entrenched Bosniak political control.

With functional duality legitimized, the OHR and the High Representative used their powers to enact the State Defence Law, creating a unified military command and a state army. They also introduced laws on indirect taxation and border control, further consolidating state authority. However, after the 2006 elections, resistance from Bosnian Serb leaders stalled additional reforms. Serb parties rejected any further alterations to the Dayton Peace Agreement, even threatening to call a referendum against unilateral changes.

Despite the deadlock, the United States has led multiple efforts to encourage comprehensive constitutional reforms in BiH, aimed at overcoming ethnic divisions and strengthening state functionality. However, resistance from local political elites, particularly those fearing the loss of ethnic-based protections and privileges, has made progress difficult.

U.S. diplomats and scholars have consistently advocated for a forward-looking interpretation of the Dayton Agreement, arguing for an institutional framework that transcends ethnic identity. Yet, opposition remains strong, with Bosnian Serb and Croat leaders wary of reforms perceived to benefit the Bosniak majority at their expense.

== Powers ==
The High Representative is provided three major powers:

- Writing and imposition of legislation, regardless of status in Parliament
- Removal of officials, elected and unelected. HR Carlos Westendorp notably used this power when he removed Nikola Poplašen from the position of President of Republika Srpska in 1999.
- Control over the judiciary, including the removal of judges and annulment of the decisions of the Constitutional Court

== Bibliography ==
- Kostić, Roland (2013). "American nation-building and the 'making' of Bosnia". In Eriksson, Mikael; Kostić, Roland (eds.). Mediation and Liberal Peacebuilding: Peace from the Ashes of War?. London-New York: Taylor & Francis. ISBN 9781136189166.
