= International Supervisor for Brčko =

Official position in Brčko, Bosnia and Herzegovina

The international supervisor for Brčko is the representative of the international community in the Brčko District.

As of 2021 all of the international supervisors have been from the United States, while their principal deputies have been from European Union countries. Since 2007, the international supervisor for Brčko serves the role of Principal Deputy High Representative for Bosnia and Herzegovina.

== Suspension of the Office of the International Supervisor ==
Following the Peace Implementation Council meeting on 23 May 2012, it was decided to suspend, not terminate, the mandate of Brčko international supervisor. Brčko Arbitral Tribunal, together with the suspended Brčko Supervision, will still continue to exist.

== List of international supervisors ==
| # | Name | Born-Died | Took office | Left office | Country |
|---|---|---|---|---|---|
| 1 | Robert William Farrand | 1934–2022 | 7 March 1997 | 2 June 2000 | United States |
| 2 | Gary L. Matthews | 1939– | 2 June 2000 | 13 March 2001 | United States |
| * | Gerhard Sontheim (Acting) | | 14 March 2001 | 19 April 2001 | Germany |
| 3 | Henry Lee Clarke | 1941– | 20 April 2001 | 30 September 2003 | United States |
| * | Gerhard Sontheim (Acting) | | 1 October 2003 | 15 January 2004 | Germany |
| 4 | Susan Rockwell Johnson | 1949– | 16 January 2004 | 30 September 2006 | United States |
| 5 | Raffi Gregorian (Note: Raffi Gregorian would later take on the role simultaneously as Principal Deputy High Representative in January 2007.) | 1963– | 1 October 2006 | 31 July 2010 | United States |
| * | Gerhard Sontheim (Acting) | | 1 August 2010 | 19 September 2010 | Germany |
| 6 | Roderick W. Moore | 1964– | 20 September 2011 | 21 October 2013 | United States |
Brcko Supervision suspended from 31 August 2012
| 7 | Tamir G. Waser | 1956– | 21 October 2013 | August 2014 | United States |
| 8 | David M. Robinson | 1949– | 1 September 2014 | September 2015 | United States |
| 9 | Bruce G. Berton | 1961– | 2 September 2015 | October 2017 | United States |
| 10 | Dennis Walter Hearne | | October 2017 | November 2018 | United States |
| 11 | Michael Scanlan | 1961– | February 2019 | 30 June 2022 | United States |
| 12 | Jonathan Mennuti | | 30 June 2022 | 13 August 2024 | United States |
| 13 | Louis J. Crishock | 1971– | 13 August 2024 | Incumbent | United States |

== See also ==
- Brčko
- Brčko District
- List of mayors of Brčko
- High Representative for Bosnia and Herzegovina
