= Louis Crishock =

American diplomat (born 1971)

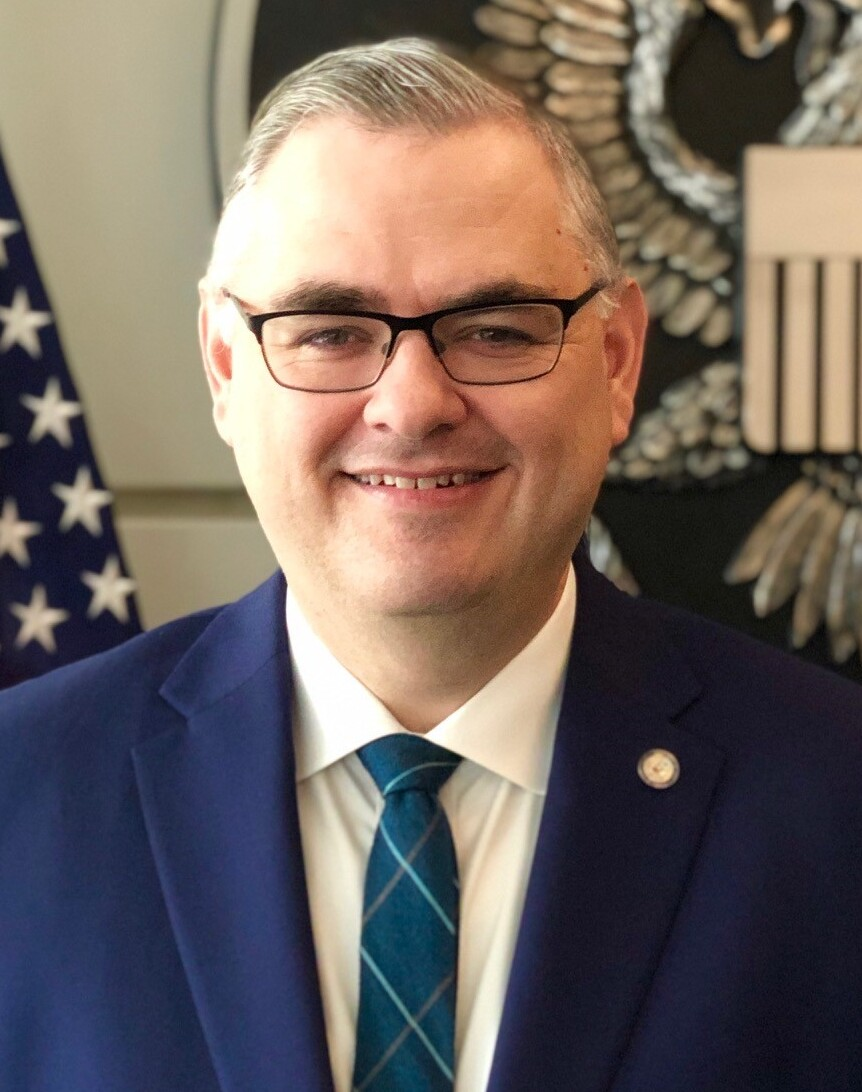
- Official portrait, 2019

Acting High Representative for Bosnia and Herzegovina
- Incumbent
- Assumed office 1 July 2026
- Preceded by: Christian Schmidt

International Supervisor for Brčko
- Incumbent
- Assumed office 13 August 2024
- Preceded by: Jonathan Mennuti

Personal details
- Born: Louis John Crishock; 8 February 1971 (age 55) Arlington, Virginia, U.S.
- Education: Catholic University of America (BA, MA); National Defense University (MS)

Louis John Crishock (born 8 February 1971) is an American diplomat currently serving as the acting High Representative for Bosnia and Herzegovina since 1 July 2026. He also serves as International Supervisor for Brčko.

== Biography ==
Louis John Crishock was born on 8 February 1971 in Arlington, Virginia. Crishock attended Bishop Ireton High School in Alexandria, Virginia—where he graduated in 1989—followed by the Catholic University of America, where he earned a B.A. in Religion summa cum laude in 1993, and an M.A. in Sociology in 1995. Afterwards, he served a year as a sociology teacher at Ural State University in Yekaterinburg, Russia, as part of the Civic Education Project. Crishock worked as the Civic Education Project's Deputy Director for Russia from 1996 to 1998. Crishock later attended the Dwight D. Eisenhower School for National Security and Resource Strategy of the National Defense University, where he was a distinguished graduate in 2017.

Crishock joined the United States Foreign Service in January 1999. In the subsequent years, he served at several overseas posting as well as in Washington, D.C. Among his positions were chargé d'affaires in St. George's, Grenada. A senior advisor to the United States Department of State, Crishock also held the title of United States Consul General in Vladivostok, Russia, served as Senior United States Official for the Arctic from 2021 to 2023, and was a State Department Resident Fellow at the Woodrow Wilson International Center for Scholars.

In August 2024, Crishock was appointed Principal Deputy High Representative for Bosnia and Herzegovina and thus also as the International Supervisor for Brčko, the representative of the international community in the Brčko District. On 1 July 2026, following the resignation of High Representative Christian Schmidt, Crishock assumed the role of Acting High Representative for Bosnia and Herzegovina until Schmidt's successor could be named.

Crishock speaks Serbo-Croatian, Russian, and some Ukrainian.
