= Vittorio Claudio Surdo =

Italian diplomat

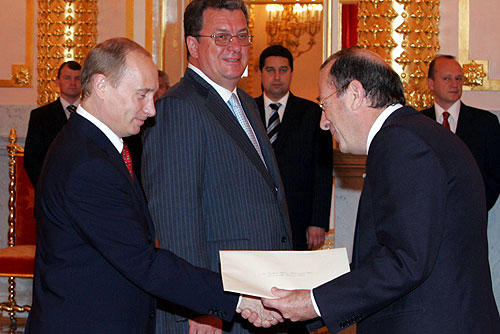
Surdo (right) presenting his credentials to Vladimir Putin in July 2006.

Vittorio Claudio Surdo is an Italian diplomat (born 22 November 1943) was Ambassador of Italy to Russia, pictured here presenting his credentials to Russian president Vladimir Putin on 25 July 2006.

== Honors ==
Order of Merit of the Italian Republic 1st Class / Knight Grand Cross – September 11, 2010
