= Alessandro Politi =

Italian philologist and theologian

Reverend Alessandro Politi
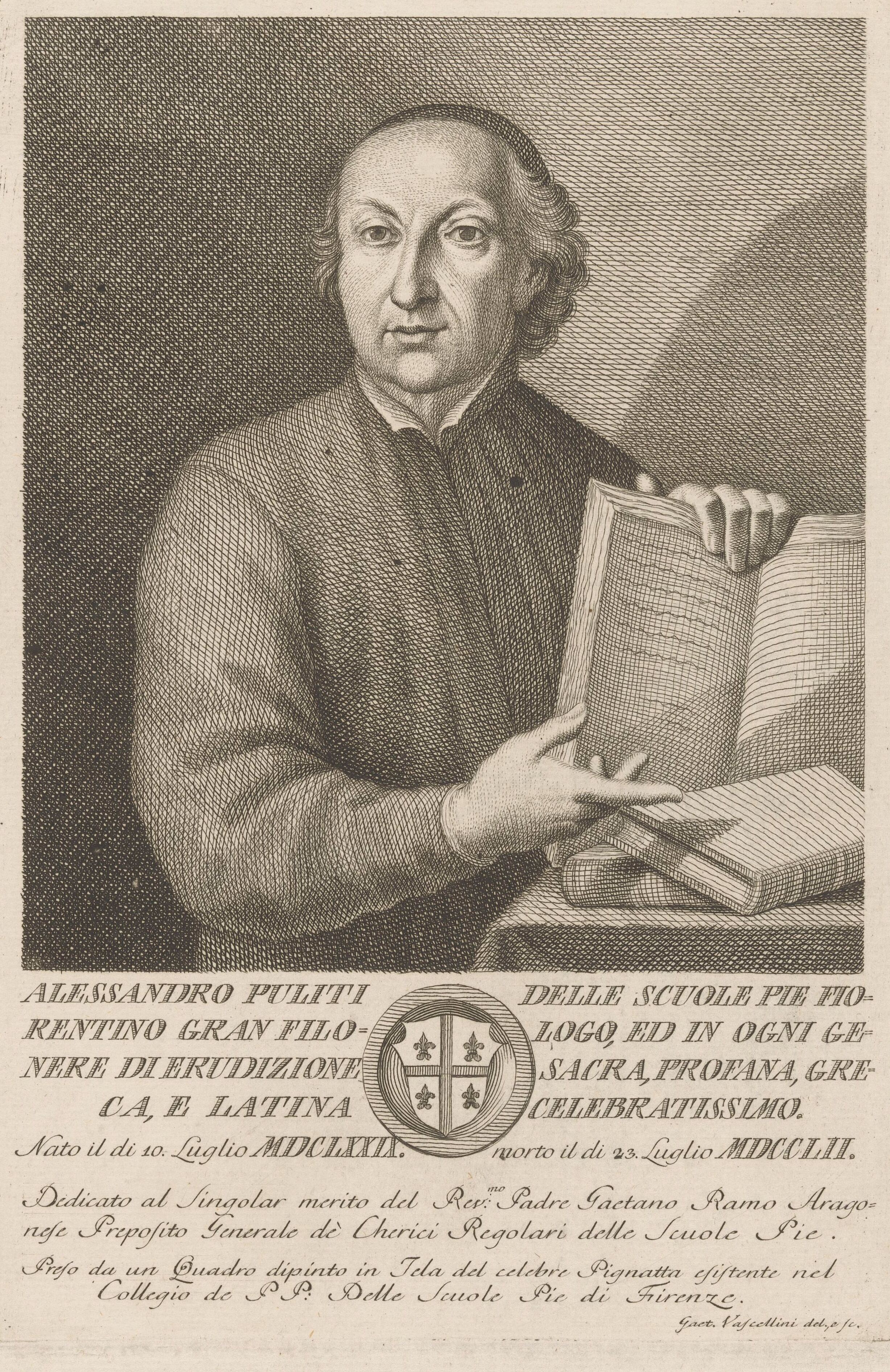
- Born: July 10, 1679; Florence, Grand Duchy of Tuscany
- Died: 23 July 1752 (aged 73); Florence, Grand Duchy of Tuscany
- Occupations: Catholic priest; Philologist; Classical scholar
- Known for: Critical editions of the works of Eustathius of Thessalonica

Academic work
- Discipline: Classics, Greek literature
- Institutions: University of Pisa

Alessandro Politi SchP (July 10, 1679 – July 23, 1752), was an Italian classical scholar and philologist.

== Biography ==
Alessandro Politi was born July 10, 1679, at Florence. After studying under the Jesuits, he entered at the age of fifteen the Order of Poor Clerics Regular of the Mother of God of the Pious Schools, and was conspicuous among its members by his rare erudition. He was called upon to teach rhetoric and peripatetic philosophy at Florence in 1700. Barring a period of about three years, during which he was a professor of theology at Genoa (1716–18), he spent the greatest part of his life in his native city, availing himself of the manifold resources he could find there to improve his knowledge of Greek literature, his favorite study. He soon made a name for himself by his careful editions of several little-known Byzantine texts, and in 1733 he was called to the chair of eloquence vacant in the University of Pisa. Accustomed to live among his books aloof from the world, Politi was of an irritable disposition, and sensitive in the extreme to the lightest criticism. He died July 25, 1752.

== Works ==
- Philosophia Peripatetica, ex mente sancti Thomae. Florence: ex typographia Michaelis Nestenus, & Antonii-Mariæ Borghigiani. 1708.
- De patria in testamentis condendis potestate. Florence: typis regiae Celsitudinis. 1712.
- Eustathii Commentarii in Homeri Iliadem. 3 vols., with notes and Latin version. Florence: apud Bernardum Paperinium. 1730–35.
- Eustathii Commentarii in Dionysium Periegetem (in Greek and Latin). Cologne: apud haer. Cramer & fratres Philibert.
- Orationes XII ad Academiam Pisanam. Lucca: ex Typographia Philippi Mariae Benedini. 1746.
- Martyrologium Romanum castigatum. Vol. 1. Florence: apud Petrum Cajetanum Vivianum. 1751.

Politi left many unpublished works. All his orations have been collected (Pisa, 1774).

== Bibliography ==
- This article incorporates public domain material from McClintock, John; Strong, James (1867–1887). Cyclopædia of Biblical, Theological and Ecclesiastical Literature. Harper and Brothers.
- Paoli, Maria Pia (2015). "POLITI, Alessandro". Dizionario Biografico degli Italiani (in Italian). Vol. 84: Piovene–Ponzo. Rome: Istituto dell'Enciclopedia Italiana. ISBN 978-88-12-00032-6.
