= High Representative for Bosnia and Herzegovina =

Political position

- Emblem of the High Representative

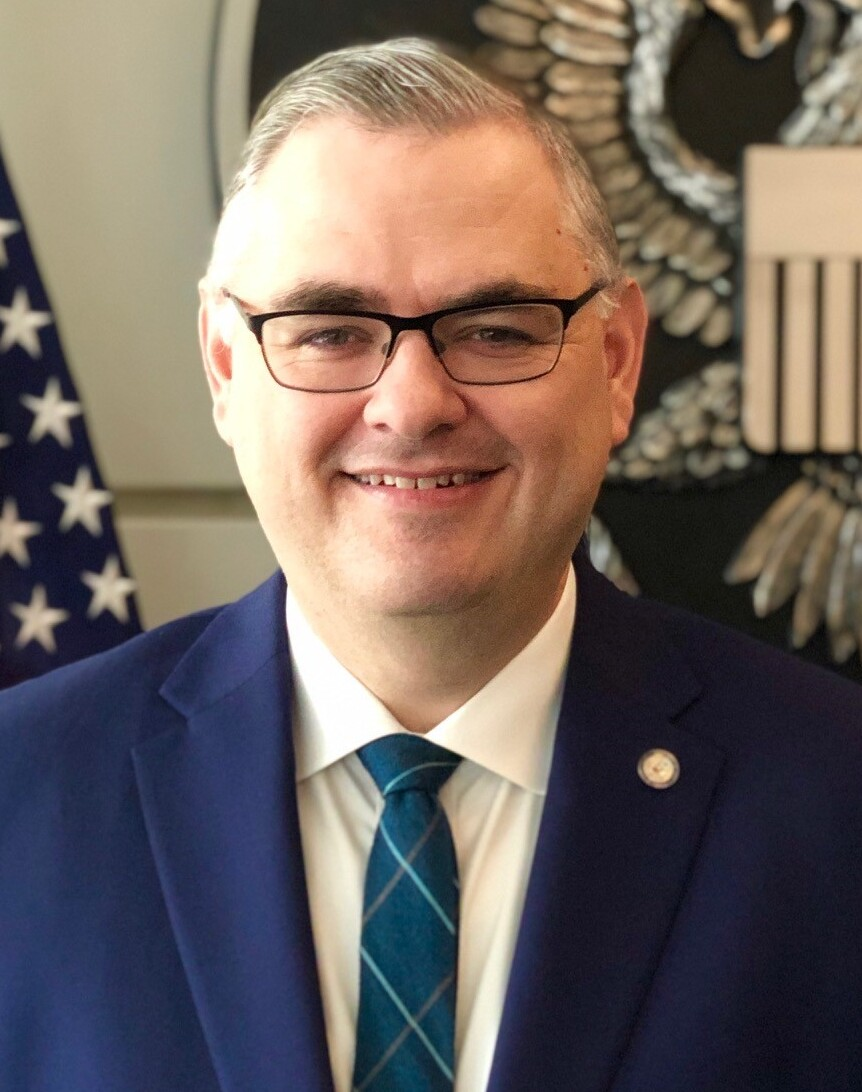
- Incumbent; Louis Crishock (acting) since 1 July 2026
- Style: Mr. High Representative (informal); His Excellency (diplomatic)
- Residence: Emerika Bluma 1, Sarajevo
- Appointer: Peace Implementation Council
- Inaugural holder: Carl Bildt
- Formation: Dayton Agreement; 14 December 1995
- Salary: 24,000 EUR per month
- Website: www.ohr.int

The post of high representative for Bosnia and Herzegovina, together with the Office of the High Representative (OHR) in Bosnia and Herzegovina, was created in 1995 immediately after the signing of the Dayton Agreement which ended the 1992 to 1995 Bosnian War. The purpose of the high representative and the OHR is to oversee the civilian implementation of the Dayton Agreement. They are appointed by and serve to represent the countries of the Peace Implementation Council (PIC).

So far, all of the high representatives named have been from European Union countries, and their principal deputies have typically been from the United States. The principal deputy high representative serves as International Supervisor for Brčko, representing the international community in the Brčko District.

The so-called Bonn Powers remain a highly contested attribute of the high representative. Although their legality is questionable, the Bonn Powers give the high representative a wide range of powers, including imposing and annulling laws and appointing and removing officials. Due to the vast powers of the High Representative over Bosnian politics and essential veto powers, the position has been compared to that of a viceroy, or of a colonial governor.

== Legal basis in the Dayton Peace Agreements ==
The Dayton Agreement created the legal basis for the OHR. Its Annex 10 provides for the institution of the Office of the High Representative (OHR) in Bosnia and Herzegovina to oversee the civilian implementation of the agreement, representing the countries involved in the Dayton Accords through the Peace Implementation Council. The annex also states that the high representative is to be appointed "consistent with relevant United Nations Security Council resolutions" and to carry out his tasks "as entrusted by a United Nations Security Council resolution". The issue of Security Council approval of high representatives has been a point of controversy in the case of Christian Schmidt's appointment in 2021, which was considered illegitimate by Russia and China as well as some politicians in Bosnia and Herzegovina.

== The "Bonn Powers" of the OHR ==
At its December 1997 meeting in Bonn, the Peace Implementation Council agreed to grant further substantial powers to the OHR, to avoid the implementation of the Dayton Agreement being delayed or obstructed by local nationalist politicians. The OHR was requested to:

1. Adopt binding decisions when local parties seem unable or unwilling to act;
2. Remove from office public officials who violate legal commitments or, in general, the DPA.

The legality of the Bonn Powers is questionable, and they were introduced after the Dayton Agreement was signed. Additionally, the PIC does not have the authority to grant powers to the high representative. Despite this, the Bonn Powers give the high representative broad authority, including the ability to make and annul laws, as well as appoint and remove officials.

The Bonn Powers were extensively used by the OHR in the following decade. Some examples include the adoption of the Defence reform in April 2003, with the suppression of the Supreme Defence Council of the Republika Srpska, and the amendment of Entity Constitutional Laws.

Until 2004, the OHR had dismissed a total of 139 officials, including judges, ministers, civil servants and members of parliaments, sometimes along with freezing their bank accounts. After the 2002 elections, the OHR scrutinised all political candidates for major ministerial positions at entity and state level.

== History ==
=== Fusion with the EUSR post ===
Between 2002 and 2011, the high representative also served as the European Union special representative to Bosnia and Herzegovina.

Under Christian Schwarz-Schilling, the OHR seemed to soften its invasiveness, thanks to pressures from the Council of Europe and a growing EU involvement. The number of OHR legislative initiatives and of dismissed officials lowered.

On 27 February 2008, the PIC decided to end the high representative's mandate on 30 June 2008. The EU decision to shut down the OHR by June 2007 unexpectedly aroused disappointment and concern in the Bosnian population, NGOs, and politicians. However, since the PIC February 2008 review, it was decided to extend that mandate indefinitely until a set of positive benchmarks have been fulfilled.

The "double hatting" between EUSR and OHR was discontinued in 2011, when the EU representative post was fused between the EUSR and the head of the EU delegation.

=== Resignation of Christian Schmidt ===
On 11 May 2026, Christian Schmidt announced his resignation as High Representative, with a new representative planning to be appointed by 14 July. This came after the U.S. demanded Schmidt's immediate resignation, away from a previous agreement where he would stay in his post until elections in October. His term ended on 1 July 2026, and was succeeded by International Supervisor for Brčko and Principal Deputy High Representative Louis J. Crishock as acting High Representative.

The U.S. has presented Italian ambassador Antonio Zanardi Landi as its preferred candidate. France, Britain, and Germany, meanwhile, have mostly supported René Troccaz, France's special envoy for the Western Balkans, as their candidate. European officials reportedly believe that U.S. manoeuvring is related to an attempt to secure a contract for the $1 billion Southern Interconnection gas pipeline, meant to connect Bosnia's energy supply to Europe, for AAFS Infrastructure and Energy, a company personally connected to Donald Trump. Officials further believe that if Landi assumes the position of High Representative he may take actions in support of the pipeline, such as by transferring nationally owned land in Republika Srpska to the government of the entity. Landi has unofficially promised to not overturn decrees from previous High Representatives, not make substantial actions without consulting the PIC, use the Bonn powers as a last resort, and not unilaterally dissolve the OHR.

== Conditions for closure of the Office of the High Representative ==
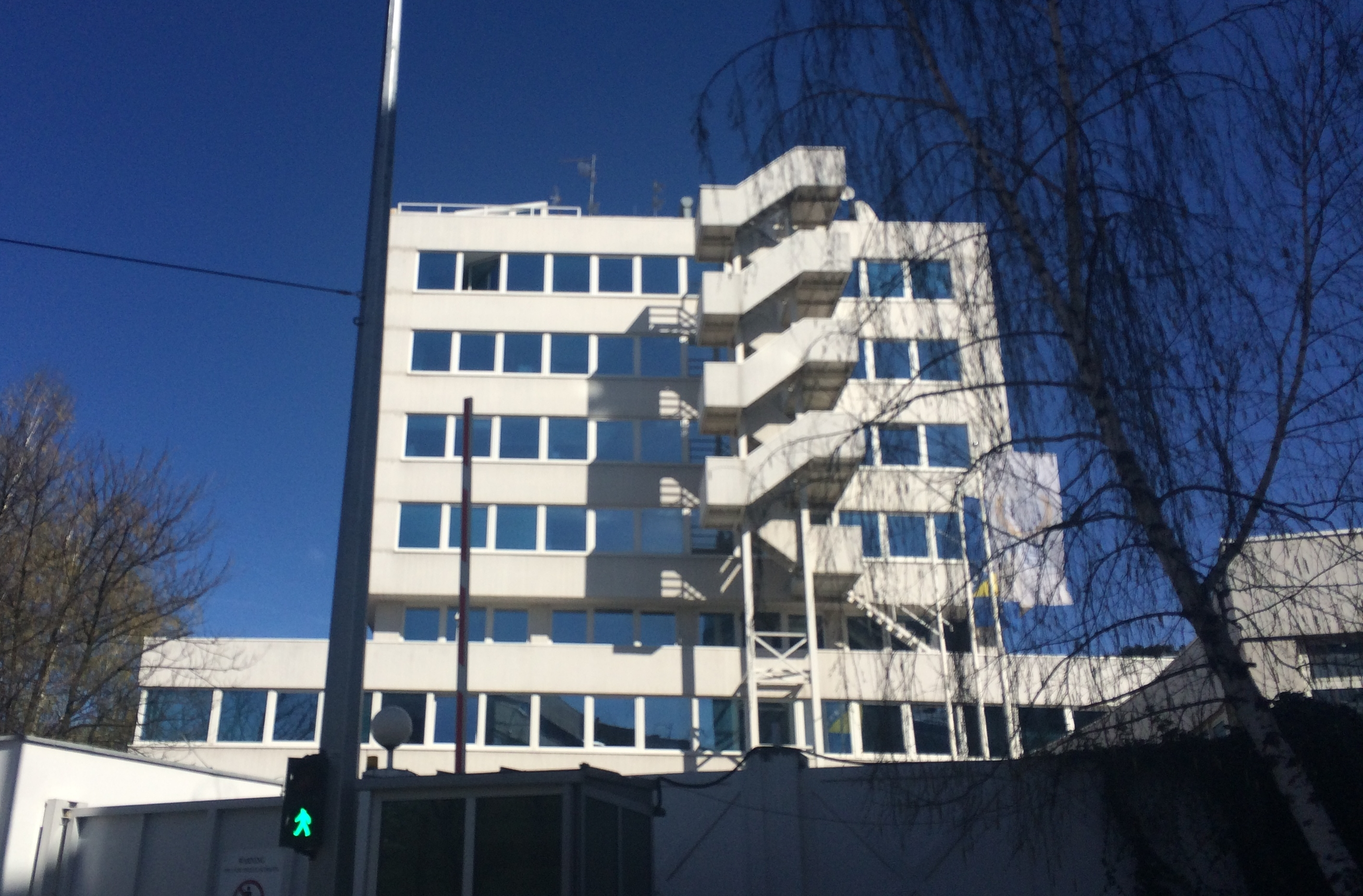
OHR building in Grbavica, Sarajevo.

In February 2008, the Peace Implementation Council set the conditions for closure of the OHR, which the PIC Steering Board considered a pre-condition for accession of Bosnia and Herzegovina to the European Union. From a long list of known priorities, the PIC selected:

- Resolution of State Property
- Resolution of Defence Property
- Completion of the Brčko Final Award – District created on March 8, 2000. Brčko Tribunal jurisdiction remains.
- Fiscal Sustainability of the State – Completed as of May 2010, should be continuously sustained
- Entrenchment of the Rule of Law – Completed as of May 2010, should be continuously sustained

In addition to these objectives there are also two conditions:

- Signing of the Stabilisation and Association Agreement – completed on 16 June 2008
- Positive assessment of the situation in BiH by the PIC Steering Board – to be assessed after all others are completed

An additional unwritten condition to be enforced through the "assessment by the PIC Steering Board" final condition, was adopted later by the US and some EU countries:

- Reform of the constitution to comply with ECHR decision of December 2009

== Criticisms ==
In the many years attempting to facilitate the integration of a stable federal Bosnian state, it has been argued that the OHR posed challenges in accomplishing its principal task. The OHR's prolonged intervention in the politics of Bosnia and Herzegovina has been considered by some as a potential cause of the allegedly low commitment of citizens towards the state, as perceived by the low voter turnout, and of the purported low accountability of politicians, whose actions may be subject to the OHR's review.

Former HR Paddy Ashdown noted the high representative has "powers that ought to make any liberal blush." Criticisms of the action of the OHR through its Bonn powers include:

- the lack of accountability of the position, which is answerable only to the Peace Implementation Council;
- the lack of due process available to those affected by HR decisions.

In addition to the potential consideration of imposing legislation on contentious issues, the OHR "developed the practice of dismissing public officials from their offices and banning them from holding any public employment again ... often without even admitting the dismissed persons to confront the charges brought against them, let alone granting them a fair hearing or a right to appeal." In June 2004, for example, Paddy Ashdown dismissed 58 public officials in a single day. Politicians and judges have been subject to potential removal. Some of those dismissed were allegedly banned for life from holding public office and their bank accounts been frozen as well. Doubts about the legality of both the OHR's interpretation of its mandate and particular actions have been expressed by the Council of Europe and others.

In 2004, the Parliamentary Assembly of the Council of Europe, which Bosnia and Herzegovina had joined in 2002, voiced complaints against OHR's actions, and expressed the need "to define a clear strategy for transferring responsibilities from the high representative to domestic authorities." Russia and China have rejected the continuation of the office and have tried at the UN to have it terminated. They argue that it violates BiH's sovereignty, and they claim that the West persists with the setup so it can remain the "guardian" of the country. Valentin Inzko, during his tenure as high representative, declared: "We have to wait for the moment that Bosnia–Herzegovina is irreversibly on its way to Euro-Atlantic integration, then we should shut down the Office."

== List of high representatives ==
No.	Portrait	Name (Birth–Death)	Term of office	Span	Country
1		Carl Bildt (born 1949)	14 December 1995 – 18 June 1997	1 year, 186 days	Sweden
2		Carlos Westendorp (1937–2026)	18 June 1997 – 18 August 1999	2 years, 61 days	Spain
3		Wolfgang Petritsch (born 1947)	18 August 1999 – 27 May 2002	2 years, 282 days	Austria
4		Paddy Ashdown (1941–2018)	27 May 2002 – 31 January 2006	3 years, 249 days	United Kingdom
5		Christian Schwarz-Schilling (1930–2026)	31 January 2006 – 2 July 2007	1 year, 152 days	Germany
6		Miroslav Lajčák (born 1963)	2 July 2007 – 26 March 2009	1 year, 267 days	Slovakia
7		Valentin Inzko (born 1949)	26 March 2009 – 1 August 2021	12 years, 128 days	Austria
8		Christian Schmidt (born 1957)	1 August 2021 – 1 July 2026	4 years, 334 days	Germany
—		Louis Crishock (born 1971); Acting	1 July 2026 – Incumbent	109 days	United States

== List of principal deputy high representatives ==
The second-ranking official at the Office of the High Representative carries the title of "Principal Deputy High Representative (PDHR)", who has also served as the International Supervisor for Brčko since 2007. For many years, the individual filling that role has been an official of the United States government, in most cases a career Foreign Service Officer of the U.S. Department of State. Throughout much of OHR's earlier history, there were also individuals who held the title of "Deputy High Representative," a rank just below that of the PDHR.

#	Officeholder	Born	Term of office		Country
1	Michael Steiner	1949	January 1996	July 1997	Germany
2	Jacques Paul Klein	1939	July 1997	July 1999	United States
3	Ralph Johnson		17 July 1999	17 July 2001	United States
4	Donald S. Hays		July 2001	March 2005	United States
5	Lawrence E. Butler	1953	March 2005	January 2007	United States
6	Raffi Gregorian (Note: Raffi Gregorian already assumed the role of International Supervisor for Brcko in October 2006 (appointed in September) before taking another role as Principal Deputy High Representative in January 2007.)	1964	January 2007	31 July 2010	United States
7	Roderick W. Moore	1964	20 September 2010	October 2013	United States
8	Tamir G. Waser		October 2013	August 2014	United States
9	David M. Robinson	1955	September 2014	September 2015	United States
10	Bruce G. Berton	1961	September 2015	October 2017	United States
11	Dennis Walter Hearne		October 2017	November 2018	United States
12	Michael Scanlan	1961	February 2019	30 June 2022	United States
13	Jonathan Mennuti		30 June 2022	13 August 2024	United States
14	Louis Crishock	1971	13 August 2024	Incumbent	United States

== See also ==
- EUFOR Althea – European peacekeeping force for overseeing the military implementation of the Dayton Agreement.
- European Union Police Mission in Bosnia and Herzegovina – Police mission in the framework of the European Union's Common Foreign and Security Policy, helping local police with organized crime and police reform.
- Special Representative of the Secretary-General for Kosovo

== Bibliography ==
- Eriksson, Mikael; Kostić, Roland, eds. (2013). Mediation and Liberal Peacebuilding: Peace from the Ashes of War?. London-New York: Taylor & Francis. ISBN 9781136189166.
