= Peace Implementation Council =

International diplomatic body

The Peace Implementation Council (PIC) is an international body charged with implementing the Dayton Peace Agreement for Bosnia and Herzegovina (BiH). The Council was established at an implementation conference held in London, United Kingdom, on 8–9 December 1995, subsequent to the completion of the negotiations of the accord the preceding month. (Note: For details see United Security Council, document symbol: S/1995/1029) The Council is, in effect, the realisation of the international community's governance of BiH after signature of the Dayton Agreement, through the High Representative for Bosnia and Herzegovina, which it appoints. The international control over BiH is to last until the country is deemed politically and democratically stable and self-sustainable.

The PIC comprises 55 countries and agencies that support the peace process in many different ways by assisting it financially, providing troops for EUFOR Althea, or directly running operations in BiH. There is also a fluctuating number of observers.

Since the London conference, the PIC has come together at the ministerial level another six times to review progress and define the goals of peace implementation for the coming period: in June 1996 in Florence, Italy; in December 1996 for a second time in London; in December 1997 in Bonn, Germany; in December 1998 in Madrid, Spain, in May 2000 and February 2007 in Brussels, Belgium.

The PIC clarifies the responsibilities of the High Representative as the main implementing body of the civilian part of the Dayton Agreement, as set out in Annex 10 the Dayton Agreement. For example, the 1997 Bonn session provided the Office of the High Representative with the so-called "Bonn authority" to dismiss elected and non-elected officials who obstruct the implementation of the Dayton Agreement. The High Representative from 2006–2007, Christian Schwarz-Schilling, used that power sparingly to promote confidence in elected domestic government. That strategy was reversed by the new appointee to that post, Miroslav Lajčák, who imposed several decisions on his first day in office.

== Steering Board ==
The London peace implementation conference established the Steering Board of the Peace Implementation Council to work under the chairmanship of the High Representative as the executive arm of the PIC.

The Steering Board members are Canada, France, Germany, Italy, Japan, Russia (Note: The Russian government pulled out of the Steering Board on 28 July 2021. Russia later announced that it was suspending funding the Office of the High Representative on 17 February 2022.), United Kingdom, United States, Presidency of the Council of the European Union, the European Commission, and the Organisation of Islamic Cooperation, represented by Turkey.

The Steering Board provides the High Representative with political guidance. In Sarajevo, the High Representative chairs bi-weekly meetings of the Ambassadors to BiH of the Steering Board members. In addition, the Steering Board meets at the level of political directors every six months.

== Members and participants ==
=== Countries ===
- Albania
- Austria
- Belgium
- Bosnia and Herzegovina
- Bulgaria
- Canada
- Croatia
- Czech Republic
- Denmark
- Egypt
- Finland
- France
- Germany
- Greece
- Hungary
- Ireland
- Italy
- Japan
- Jordan
- Luxembourg
- Malaysia
- Morocco
- Netherlands
- North Macedonia
- Norway
- Oman
- Pakistan
- Poland
- Romania
- Saudi Arabia
- Serbia
- Slovakia
- Slovenia
- Spain
- Sweden
- Switzerland
- Turkey
- Ukraine
- United Kingdom
- United States of America

==== Former countries ====
- China (withdrew)
- Russia
- Yugoslavia (succeeded by Serbia)

=== International organizations ===
- Office of the High Representative
- Council of Europe
- European Bank for Reconstruction and Development
- European Commission
- International Committee of the Red Cross
- International Criminal Tribunal for the former Yugoslavia
- International Monetary Fund
- NATO
- Organization for Security and Co-operation in Europe
- United Nations
- UN High Commissioner for Human Rights
- UN High Commissioner for Refugees
- World Bank

==== Former organizations ====
- Brčko Arbitration Panel (dissolved)
- UN Transitional Administration of Eastern Slavonia (disbanded)

=== Observers ===
- Australia
- Central Bank of Bosnia and Herzegovina
- European Investment Bank
- Estonia
- Holy See
- Human Rights Ombudsperson in Bosnia and Herzegovina
- Iceland
- International Federation of Red Cross and Red Crescent Societies
- International Mediator for Bosnia and Herzegovina
- International Organization for Migration
- Latvia
- Lithuania
- New Zealand
- Liechtenstein
- South Africa
- Stability Pact for South Eastern Europe

== See also ==
- International Steering Group for Kosovo
